= List of lakes of Norway =

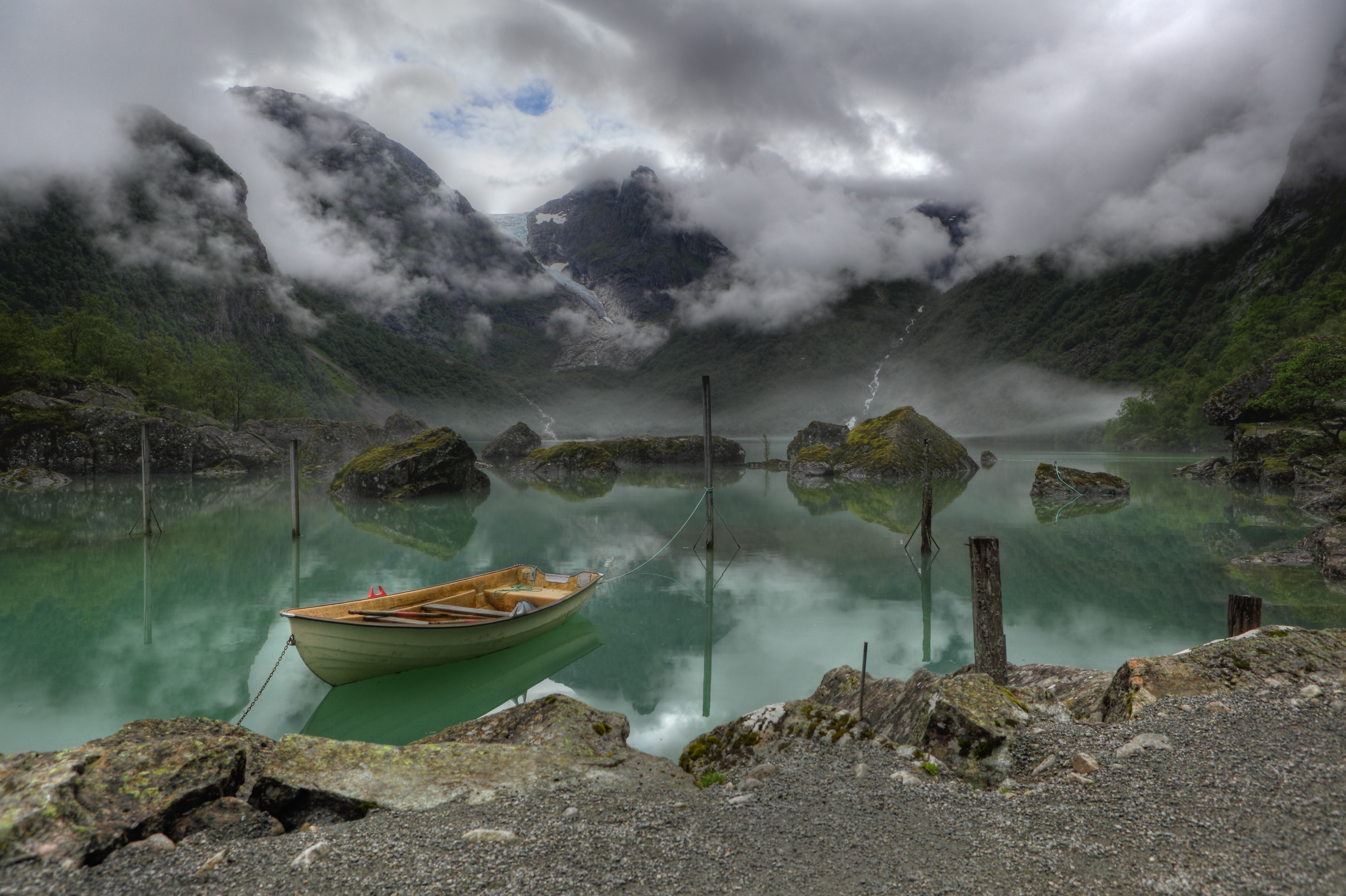
A view of Lake Bondhus in Hordaland

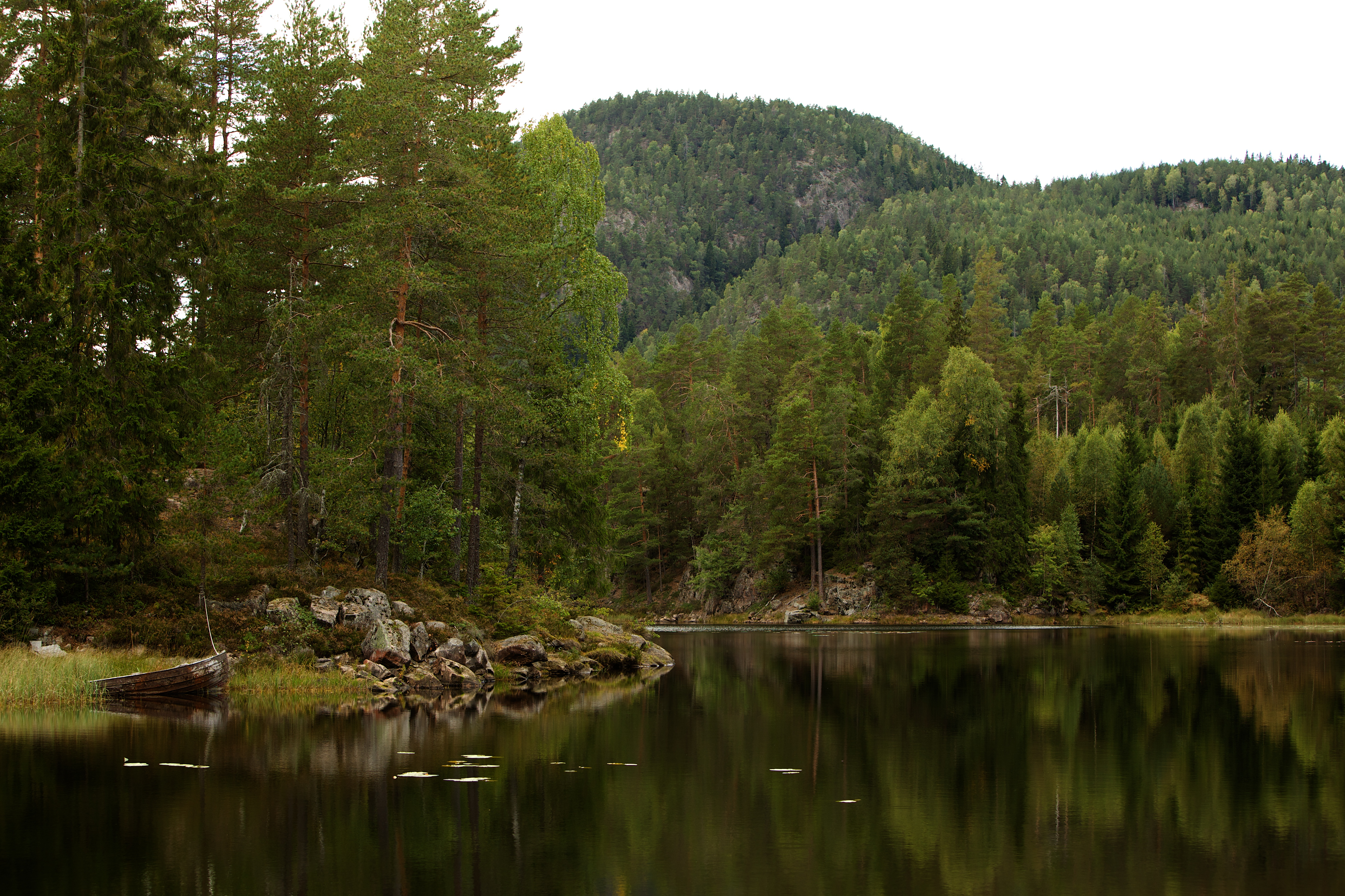
Lake Ulvsvann in Skien, Telemark

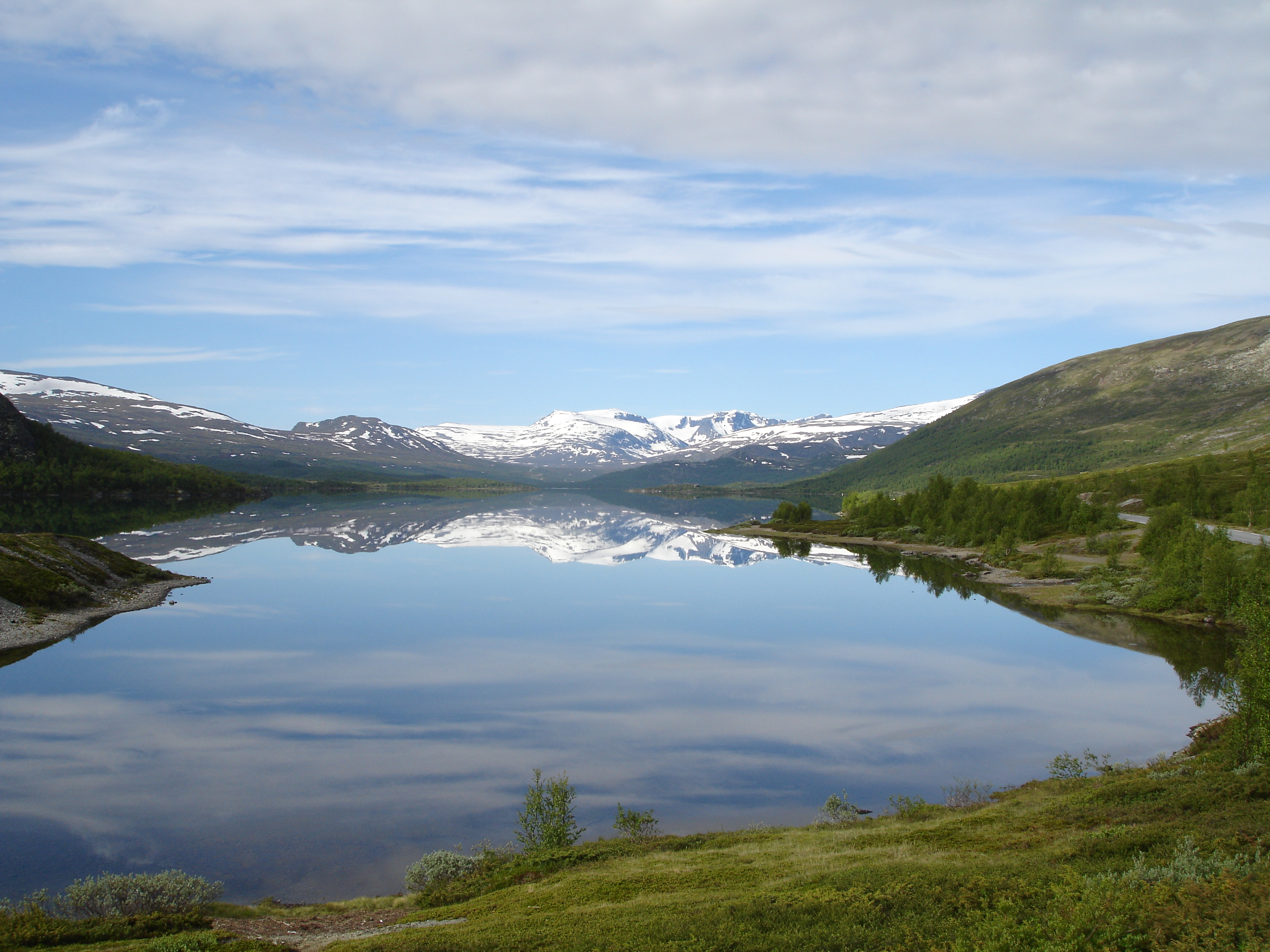
Lake Øvre Sjodalsvatnet in Oppland

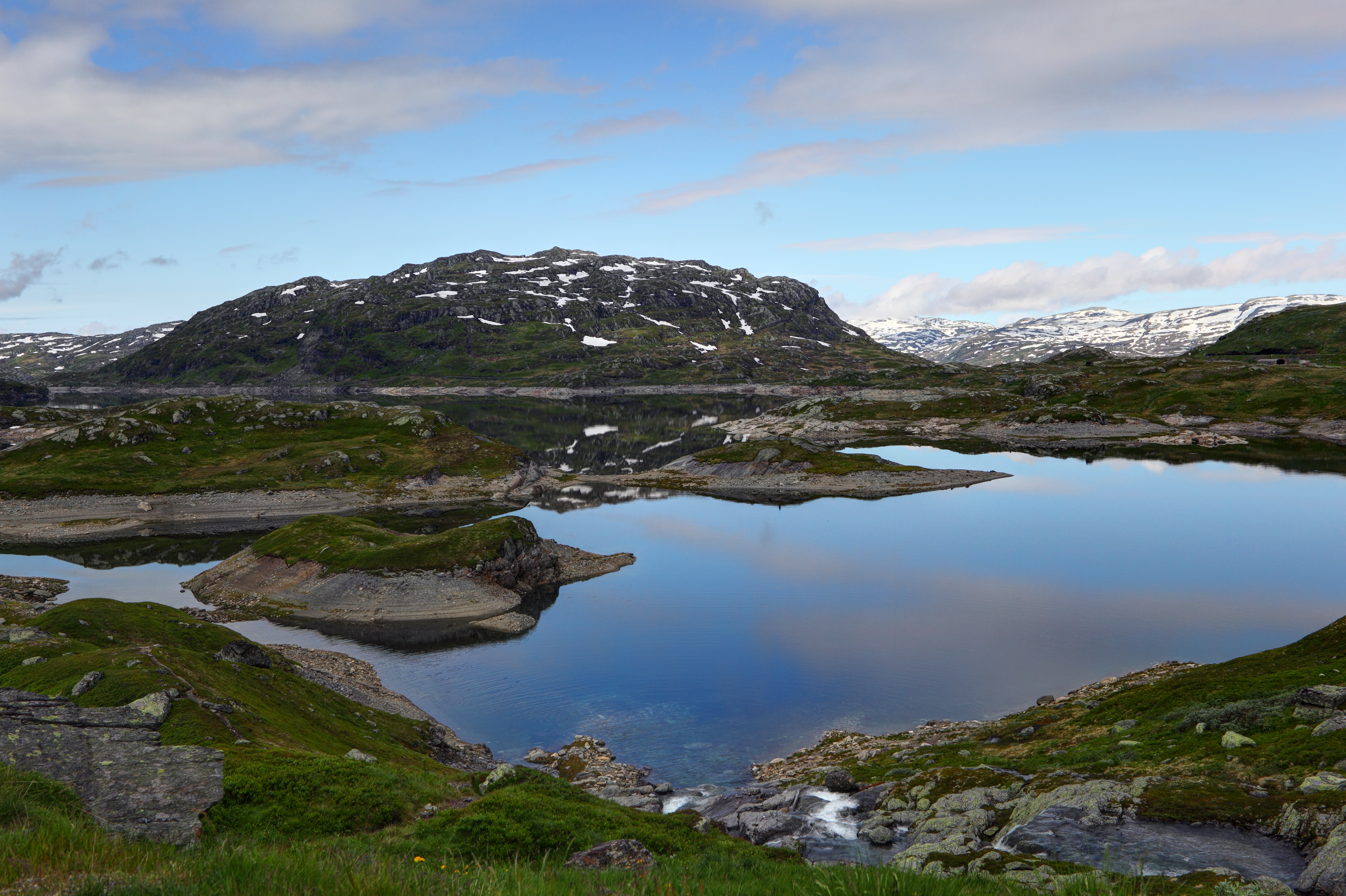
Lake Votna in Hordaland

This is a list of lakes and reservoirs in Norway, sorted by county.

For the geography and history of lakes in that country, see Lakes in Norway, including:

- List of largest lakes in Norway
- List of deepest lakes in Norway

== Akershus ==
- Bjørkelangen
- Bogstadvannet
- Dælivannet
- Engervannet
- Hallangen
- Hurdalsjøen
- Lyseren
- Mangen
- Mjøsa
- Øgderen
- Østernvann
- Øyangen (Gran)
- Øyeren
- Rødenessjøen
- Setten

== Aust-Agder ==
- Åraksfjorden
- Blåsjø
- Botnsvatnet
- Botsvatn
- Breidvatn
- Byglandsfjorden
- Fisstøylvatnet
- Grøssæ
- Gyvatn
- Hartevatnet
- Herefossfjorden
- Holmavatnet
- Holmevatnet
- Homstølvatnet
- Hovatn
- Høvringsvatnet
- Kilefjorden
- Kolsvatnet
- Kvifjorden
- Longerakvatnet
- Måvatn
- Myklevatnet
- Nasvatn
- Nelaug
- Nesvatn
- Nystølfjorden
- Ogge
- Ormsavatnet
- Østre Grimevann
- Øyarvatnet
- Ramvatn
- Reinevatn
- Rore
- Rosskreppfjorden
- Sæsvatn
- Skyvatn
- Store Bjørnevatn
- Store Urevatn
- Straumsfjorden
- Svartevatnet
- Syndle
- Topsæ
- Uldalsåna
- Vatndalsvatnet
- Vegår

== Buskerud ==
- Bjornesfjorden
- Brommafjorden
- Damtjern (Ringerike)
- Eikeren
- Flakavatnet
- Geitsjøen
- Halnefjorden
- Hettefjorden
- Juklevatnet
- Kravikfjorden
- Krøderen
- Langesjøen
- Lauvnesvatnet
- Mykle
- Norefjorden
- Nygardsvatnet
- Nyhellervatnet
- Øljusjøen
- Ørteren
- Øvre Hein
- Øyangen (Ringerike)
- Pålsbufjorden
- Rødungen
- Samsjøen (Ringerike)
- Skaupsjøen
- Sperillen
- Stolsvatnet
- Strandavatnet
- Tingvollfjorden (Buskerud)
- Tinnhølen
- Tisleifjorden
- Tunhovdfjorden
- Tyrifjorden
- Ullerentjernet
- Ustevatn
- Vavatn
- Vestre Bjonevatnet

== Finnmark ==
- Bajášjávri
- Bajit Spielgajávri
- Biggejávri
- Bjørnstadvatnet
- Čárajávri
- Čorotjávri
- Dátkojávri
- Doggejávri
- Gahččanjávri
- Gákkajávri
- Gardsjøen (Sør-Varanger)
- Garsjøen
- Gásadatjávri
- Gavdnjajávri
- Geađgejávri
- Geašjávri
- Geassájávri
- Geatnjajávri
- Guolehis Suolojávri
- Hæmmujávri
- Havvatnet
- Idjajávri
- Iešjávri
- Juovvajávri
- Kjæsvannet
- Klistervatnet
- Kovvatnet (Finnmark)
- Láhpojávri
- Latnetjávri
- Nissojávri
- Nuorbejávri
- Rágesjávri
- Sálganjávri
- Soagŋojávri
- Store Måsvannet
- Stuora Galbajávri
- Stuorajávri (Alta)
- Stuorajávri (Kautokeino)
- Sundvatnet
- Šuoikkatjávri
- Suolojávri (Kautokeino)
- Suolojávri (Lebesby)
- Svanevatn
- Virdnejávri
- Vuolit Spielgajávri

== Hedmark ==
- Atnsjøen
- Digeren
- Engeren
- Falningsjøen
- Femund
- Flensjøen
- Fundin
- Galtsjøen
- Gardsjøen (Grue)
- Gjesåssjøen
- Gutulisjøen
- Harrsjøen
- Hukusjøen
- Innerdalsvatnet
- Isteren
- Langsjøen
- Lomnessjøen
- Mangen
- Marsjøen
- Mjøsa
- Møkeren
- Nedre Roasten
- Nugguren
- Osensjø
- Råsen
- Rogen
- Rokosjøen
- Savalen
- Siksjøen
- Skasen
- Skjervangen
- Storsjø (Nord-Odal)
- Storsjøen (Rendalen)
- Vermunden
- Vurrusjøen

== Hordaland ==
- Askevatnet
- Askjelldalsvatnet
- Bjølsegrøvvatnet
- Blådalsvatnet
- Bondhusvatnet
- Eidfjordvatnet
- Evangervatnet
- Finsevatnet
- Flakavatnet
- Gjønavatnet
- Granvinsvatnet
- Halnefjorden
- Hamlagrøvatnet
- Henangervatnet
- Holmavatnet (Hordaland)
- Jordalsvatnet
- Juklavatnet
- Kalandsvatnet
- Kvennsjøen
- Langavatnet (Odda)
- Lille Lungegårdsvannet
- Løkjelsvatnet
- Lønavatnet
- Nordmannslågen
- Onarheimsvatnet
- Oppheimsvatnet
- Ringedalsvatnet
- Røldalsvatnet
- Sandvinvatnet
- Skaupsjøen
- Skjerjavatnet
- Skogseidvatnet
- Stakkastadvatnet
- Steinslandsvatnet
- Storavatnet, Laksevåg
- Storavatnet, Holsnøy
- Svartediket
- Sysenvatnet
- Taugevatn
- Tinnhølen
- Torfinnsvatnet
- Valldalsvatnet
- Vangsvatnet
- Veivatnet
- Vigdarvatnet
- Votna

== Møre og Romsdal ==
- Aursjøen
- Brusdalsvatnet
- Djupvatnet
- Eikesdalsvatnet
- Foldsjøen
- Gråsjøen
- Moldevatnet
- Votna

== Nord-Trøndelag ==
- Almåsgrønningen
- Andorsjøen
- Bangsjøan
- Byavatnet
- Eidsvatnet
- Feren
- Finnvollvatnet
- Fjergen
- Fossemvatnet
- Funnsjøen
- Gilten
- Grøningen
- Grungstadvatnet
- Gusvatnet
- Hammervatnet
- Havdalsvatnet
- Hoklingen
- Holden (Lierne)
- Holden (Verran)
- Holderen
- Ingjelsvatnet
- Innsvatnet
- Jengelvatnet
- Kalvvatnet
- Kingen
- Kvesjøen
- Laksjøen
- Leksdalsvatnet
- Limingen
- Lysvatnet (Verran)
- Mellingsvatnet
- Meltingvatnet
- Mjosundvatnet
- Mokkavatnet
- Movatnet
- Murusjøen
- Namsvatnet
- Ormsetvatnet
- Ovrejaevrie
- Øyvatnet
- Rengen
- Saglivatnet
- Salvatnet
- Sandsjøen
- Snåsavatnet
- Sønningen
- Store Øyingen
- Storfrøyningen
- Storgåsvatnet
- Storgollomsvatnet
- Storgrønningen
- Stortissvatnet
- Storvatnet (Leksvik)
- Storvatnet (Nærøy)
- Straumsetervatnet
- Tunnsjøen
- Tunnsjøflyan
- Ulen
- Veresvatnet

== Nordland ==
- Åbjørvatnet
- Alsvågvatnet
- Andfiskvatnet
- Andkjelvatnet
- Arstaddalsdammen
- Balvatnet
- Baugevatnet
- Båvrojávrre
- Bjørnefossvatnet
- Blåmannsisvatnet
- Bleiksvatnet
- Bleikvatnet
- Blerekvatnet
- Bogvatnet
- Børsvatnet
- Daningen
- Drevvatnet
- Eidvatnet
- Elsvatnet
- Famnvatnet
- Faulvatnet
- Fellvatnet
- Finnknevatnet
- Fiskelausvatnet (Grane)
- Fiskeløysvatnet (Saltdal)
- Fjærvatnet
- Fjellvatnet
- Fjerdvatnet
- Forsanvatnet
- Forsvatnet
- Fustvatnet
- Gåsvatnet
- Gautelisvatnet
- Geitvatnet
- Gjømmervatnet
- Grasvatnet
- Grovatnet
- Hartvikvatnet
- Heggmovatnet
- Helgåvatnet
- Hjertvatnet
- Hopvatnet
- Horndalsvatnet
- Hundålvatnet
- Indre Sildvikvatnet
- Iptojávri
- Jengelvatnet
- Kaldvågvatnet
- Kallvatnet
- Kalvvatnet
- Kilvatnet
- Kjårdavatnet
- Kjelvatnet (Ballangen)
- Kjelvatnet (Fauske)
- Kjemåvatnet
- Kjerringvatnet (Hattfjelldal)
- Kobbvatnet
- Krutvatnet
- Kvitvatnet
- Låmivatnet
- Langvatnet (Ballangen)
- Langvatnet (Fauske)
- Langvatnet (Gildeskål)
- Langvatnet (Rana)
- Langvatnet (Sørfold)
- Langvatnet (Tysfjord)
- Leirvatnet (Sørfold)
- Litle Sokumvatnet
- Litlumvatnet
- Litlverivatnet
- Livsejávrre
- Lossivatnet
- Luktvatnet
- Lysvatnet (Meløy)
- Majavatnet
- Makkvatnet
- Markavatnet (Meløy)
- Melkevatnet
- Mellingsvatnet
- Mjåvatnet
- Mørsvikvatnet
- Muorkkejávrre
- Nedre Fagervollvatnet
- Nedre Fiplingvatnet
- Nedre Veikvatnet
- Nedrevatnet
- Niingsvatnet
- Nordre Bjøllåvatnet
- Ømmervatnet
- Överuman
- Øvrevatnet
- Ramsgjelvatnet
- Ranseren
- Raudvatnet
- Reingardslivatnet
- Reinoksvatnet
- Rekvatnet
- Rødvatnet
- Røssvatnet
- Rotvatnet
- Røyrvatnet
- Rundvatnet
- Saglivatnet
- Sandnesvatnet
- Sausvatnet
- Sealggajávri
- Sefrivatnet
- Siiddašjávri
- Sildhopvatnet
- Simskardvatnet
- Sisovatnet
- Skilvatnet
- Skogvollvatnet
- Šluŋkkajávri
- Sokumvatnet
- Solbjørnvatnet
- Soløyvatnet
- Søre Bukkevatnet
- Søre Vistvatnet
- Storakersvatnet
- Store Svenningsvatnet
- Storglomvatnet
- Stormålvatnet
- Stormyrbassenget
- Storskogvatnet
- Storvatnet (Ballangen)
- Straumfjordvatnet
- Straumvatnet
- Strindvatnet
- Trollvatnet
- Unkervatnet
- Unna Guovdelisjávri
- Valnesvatnet
- Vatnvatnet
- Virvatnet
- Vuolep Sårjåsjávrre

== Oppland ==
- Akksjøen
- Atnsjøen
- Aursjoen
- Aursjøen
- Avalsjøen
- Bessvatnet
- Breiddalsvatnet
- Bukkehammartjørna
- Bygdin
- Dokkfløyvatn
- Einavatnet
- Feforvatnet
- Flatningen
- Fleinsendin
- Gjende
- Grønvatnet
- Helin
- Lalmsvatnet
- Lemonsjøen
- Lesjaskogsvatnet
- Losna
- Mjøsa
- Nedre Heimdalsvatn
- Olefjorden
- Olstappen
- Otrøvatnet
- Øvre Leirungen
- Øvre Sjodalsvatnet
- Øyangen (Gran)
- Øyangen (Nord-Fron)
- Øyangen (Valdres)
- Prestesteinsvatnet
- Randsfjorden
- Rauddalsvatn
- Rondvatnet
- Russvatnet
- Samsjøen (Ringerike)
- Sandvatnet/Kaldfjorden/Øyvatnet
- Slettningen
- Slidrefjord
- Steinbusjøen
- Strondafjorden
- Tesse
- Tisleifjorden
- Tordsvatnet
- Tyin
- Vågåvatn
- Vangsmjøse
- Vestre Bjonevatnet
- Vinstre

== Oslo ==
- Bogstadvannet
- Lutvann
- Maridalsvannet
- Nordre Puttjern
- Nøklevann
- Østensjøvannet
- Øvresetertjern
- Sognsvann
- Sværsvann
- Tryvann

== Østfold ==
- Ara
- Aspern
- Femsjøen
- Isesjøen
- Lyseren
- Mingevannet
- Øgderen
- Ørsjøen
- Øyeren
- Øymarksjøen
- Rødenessjøen
- Rømsjøen
- Store Erte
- Store Le
- Vansjø
- Vestvannet
- Visterflo

== Rogaland ==
- Aksdalsvatnet
- Austrumdalsvatnet
- Blåsjø
- Byrkjelandsvatnet
- Edlandsvatnet
- Eiavatnet
- Flassavatnet
- Frøylandsvatnet
- Frøylandsvatnet (Sandnes)
- Grøsfjellvatnet
- Hofreistæ
- Holmavatnet
- Holmevatnet
- Hovsvatnet
- Limavatnet
- Lundevatn
- Nilsebuvatnet
- Nodlandsvatnet
- Oltedalsvatnet
- Orrevatnet
- Ørsdalsvatnet
- Øvre Tysdalsvatnet
- Stakkastadvatnet
- Stokkavatnet (Forus)
- Suldalsvatnet
- Svartevatnet
- Teksevatnet
- Tysdalsvatnet
- Vatsvatnet
- Vigdarvatnet
- Vostervatnet

== Sogn og Fjordane ==
- Austdalsvatnet
- Breimsvatn
- Degnepollvatnet
- Dingevatn
- Eldrevatnet
- Emhjellevatnet
- Endestadvatnet
- Fretheimsdalsvatnet
- Hafslovatnet
- Holsavatnet
- Holskardvatnet
- Hornindalsvatnet
- Jølstravatn
- Juklevatnet
- Lovatnet
- Nyhellervatnet
- Øljusjøen
- Oppstrynsvatn
- Prestesteinsvatnet
- Styggevatnet
- Tyin

== Sør-Trøndelag ==
- Aursund
- Benna
- Bolagen
- Botn (Sør-Trøndelag)
- Esandsjø
- Femund
- Feragen
- Flensjøen
- Fundin
- Gagnåsvatnet
- Gjevilvatnet
- Håsjøen
- Hostovatnet
- Jonsvatnet
- Korssjøen
- Malmsjøen
- Nedre Roasten
- Nesjø
- Øyangsvatnet
- Øyungen
- Rambergsjøen
- Riasten
- Rien
- Rogen
- Samsjøen (Sør-Trøndelag)
- Selbusjø
- Sørungen
- Stordalsvatnet
- Storvatnet (Leksvik)
- Straumsetervatnet
- Svorksjøen
- Vasslivatnet
- Våvatnet

== Telemark ==
- Bandak
- Bolkesjø
- Farris
- Flåvatn
- Fyresvatn
- Holmavatnet
- Kalhovdfjorden
- Kviteseidvatn
- Lake Tinn
- Møsvatn
- Nisser
- Norsjø
- Seljordsvatnet
- Songevatnet
- Toke
- Totak

== Troms ==
- Altevatnet
- Geavdnjajávri
- Leinavatn
- Lille Rostavatn
- Lysvatnet (Lenvik)
- Niingsvatnet
- Prestvannet
- Rihpojávri
- Rostojávri
- Šuoikkatjávri

== Vest-Agder ==
- 3. Stampe
- Gillsvannet
- Gjuvvatnet
- Gravatnet
- Gyvatn
- Juvatn
- Kilefjorden
- Kulivatnet
- Kumlevollvatnet
- Kvifjorden
- Lundevatn
- Lygne
- Nåvatnet
- Øre
- Øyarvatnet
- Rosskreppfjorden
- Selura
- Sirdalsvatnet
- Svartevatnet
- Valevatn
- Venneslafjorden
- Vollevannet
- Ytre Øydnavatnet

== Vestfold ==
- Eikeren
- Farris
- Goksjø
- Hallevatnet

== See also ==
- Geography of Norway
- List of rivers in Norway
