= Strømsfoss =

Village in Aremark municipality, Norway

Coordinates: 59°18′N 11°40′E

Strømsfoss is a village in Aremark municipality, Norway. Here, the Øymarksjøen-Rødenessjøen-Ara-Aspern-Femsjøen watershed meets the national road between Aremark and Rakkestad as well as the county road between Aremark and Ørje. Strømsfoss has a watermill museum, housed in an old mill built in 1897–98. It also has a power station from 1920.
