= Marsjøen =

Lake in Folldal, Norway

- Interactive map of the lake
- Location: Folldal Municipality, Innlandet
- Coordinates: 62°21′5″N 10°3′52″E
- Catchment area: 23.39 km^{2} (9.03 sq mi)
- Basin countries: Norway
- Max. length: 3 kilometres (1.9 mi)
- Max. width: 1.4 kilometres (0.87 mi)
- Surface area: 2.64 km^{2} (1.02 sq mi)
- Shore length^{1}: 9.06 kilometres (5.63 mi)
- Surface elevation: 1,064 metres (3,491 ft)
- References: NVE
- ^{1} Shore length is not a well-defined measure.

Marsjøen is a lake in Folldal Municipality in Innlandet county, Norway. The 2.64-square-kilometre (1.02 sq mi) lake lies in the northern part of the municipality, about 7 kilometres (4.3 mi) east of the larger lake Fundin. There is a dam at the south end of the lake which is used to regulate the water height for use in the nearby Einunna and Savalen hydro-electric power stations.

== See also ==
- List of lakes in Norway
