= Samsjøen =

Samsjøen may refer to:

== Places ==
- Samsjøen (Trøndelag), a lake in Midtre Gauldal and Melhus municipalities in Trøndelag county in Norway
- Samsjøen (Ringerike), a lake in Ringerike and Jevnaker municipalities in Buskerud and Oppland counties in Norway
