= Norefjorden =

Lake in Norway

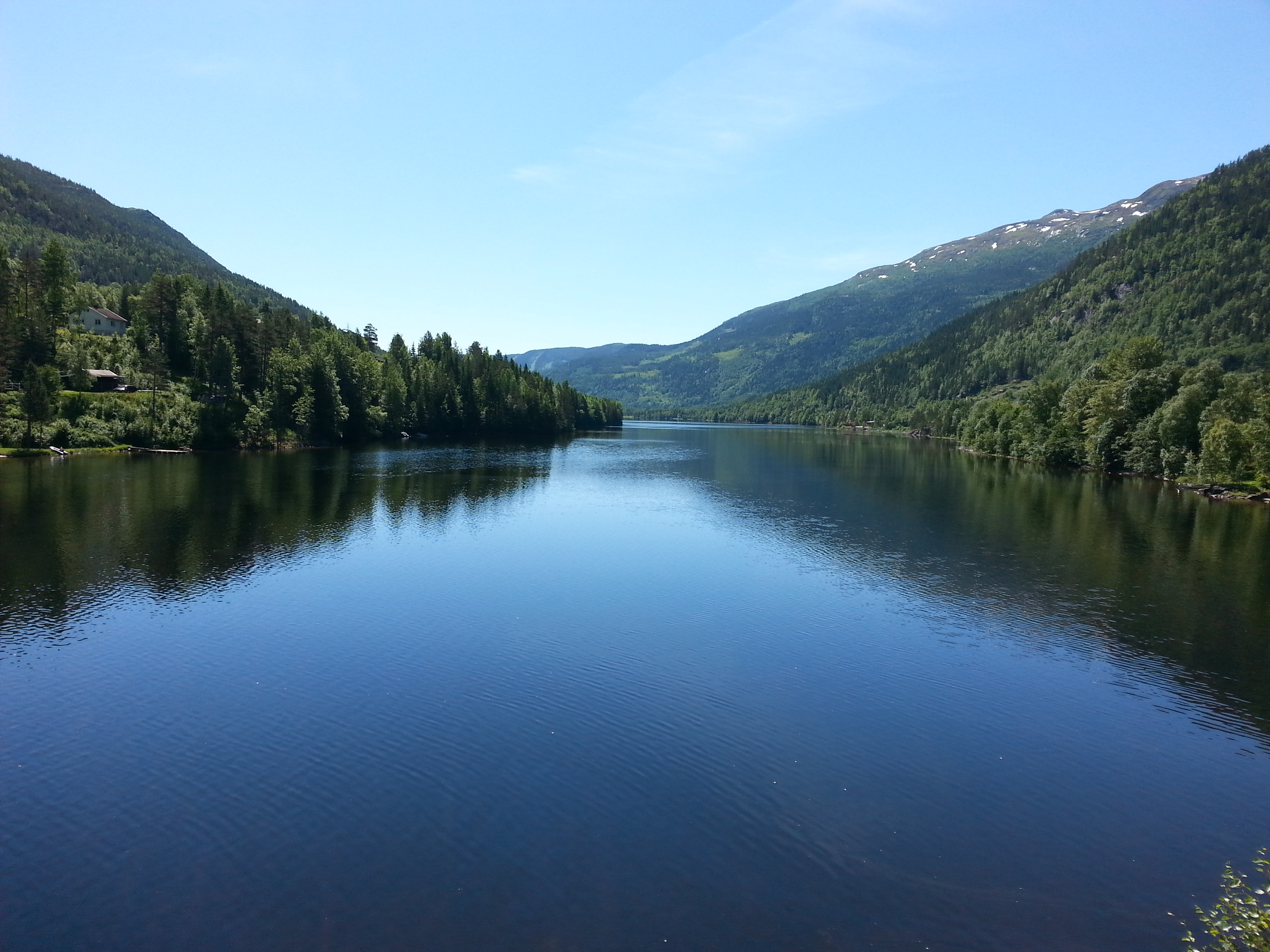
- Norefjorden

- Location within Norway
- Location: Nore og Uvdal (Buskerud)
- Coordinates: 60°11′56″N 9°1′2″E
- Basin countries: Norway
- Surface area: 3.90 km^{2} (1.51 sq mi)
- Shore length^{1}: 24.85 km (15.44 mi)
- Surface elevation: 265 m (869 ft)
- References: NVE
- ^{1} Shore length is not a well-defined measure.

Norefjorden is a lake in the municipality of Nore og Uvdal in Buskerud, Norway. Norefjorden is a long, narrow mountain lake which is known for its fishing. Numedalslågen flows into the far north and exits travelling southward to Kravikfjorden. Norefjord bridge goes across the lake between Norefjord and Gvåle. The surrounding terrain is steep and forested.

== See also ==
- List of lakes in Norway
