= Øyangen (Gran) =

Lake in Innlandet, Norway

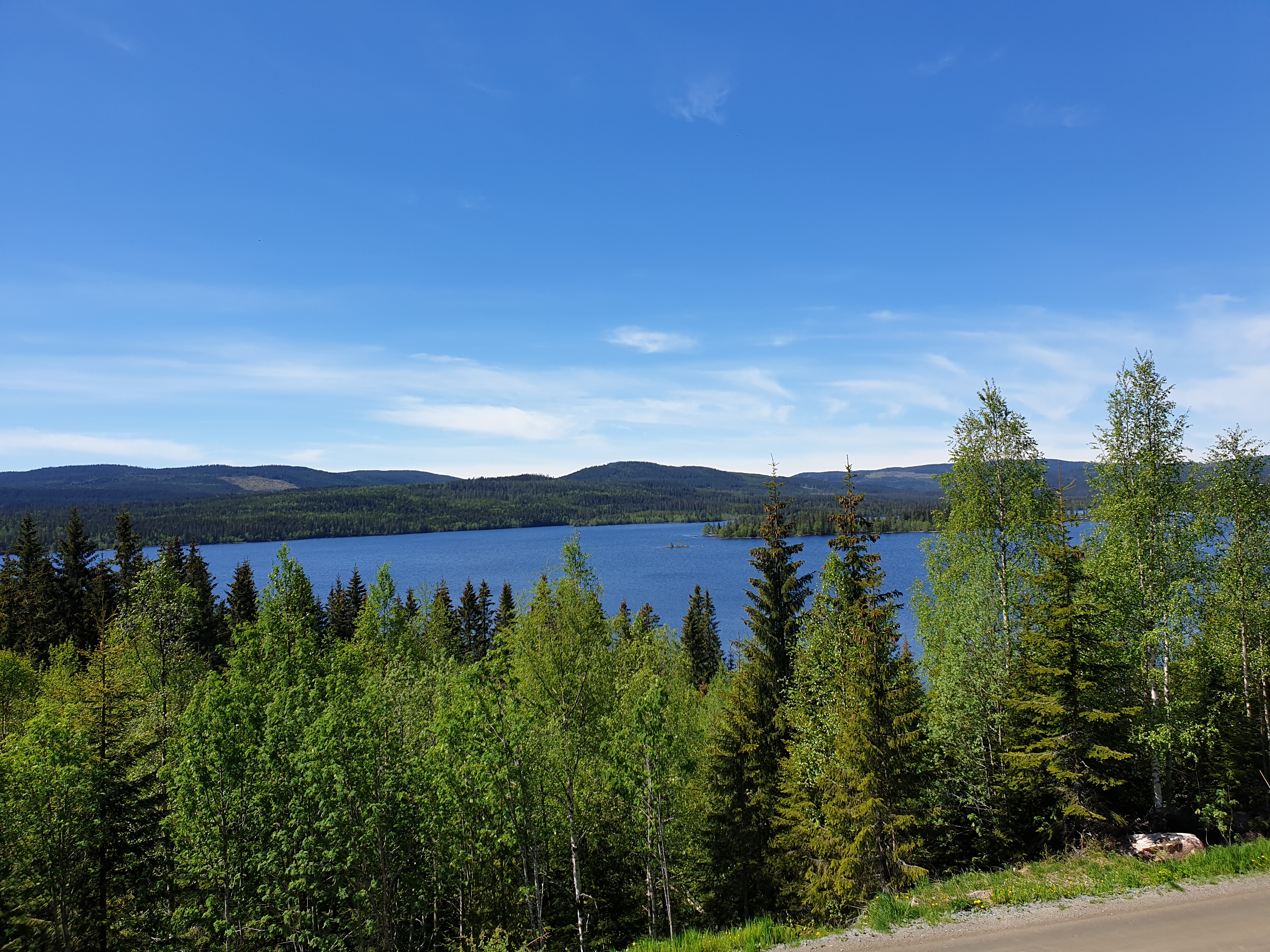
- Øyangen lake, seen from Jeppedalsvegen in Hurdal
- Interactive map of the lake
- Location: Gran (Innlandet); Hurdal (Akershus)
- Coordinates: 60°22′13″N 10°53′54″E
- Basin countries: Norway
- Max. length: 4.5 kilometres (2.8 mi)
- Max. width: 1.7 kilometres (1.1 mi)
- Surface area: 4.03 km^{2} (1.56 sq mi)
- Shore length^{1}: 16 kilometres (9.9 mi)
- Surface elevation: 442 metres (1,450 ft)
- References: NVE
- ^{1} Shore length is not a well-defined measure.

Øyangen is a lake in eastern Norway. The lake is located on the border of Gran Municipality in Innlandet county and Hurdal Municipality in Akershus county. The 4.03-square-kilometre (1.56 sq mi) lake lies about 20 kilometres (12 mi) east of the village of Jaren and about 8 kilometres (5.0 mi) to the west of the larger lake Hurdalsjøen.

== See also ==
- List of lakes in Norway
