= Brommafjorden =

Part of the hallindal river

- Location within Buskerud
- Location: Nesbyen (Buskerud)
- Coordinates: 60°33′3″N 9°8′32″E
- Basin countries: Norway
- Surface area: 3.16 km^{2} (1.22 sq mi)
- Shore length^{1}: 27.21 km (16.91 mi)
- Surface elevation: 152 m (499 ft)
- References: NVE
- ^{1} Shore length is not a well-defined measure.

Brommafjorden is a lake in the municipality of Nesbyen in Buskerud county, Norway. Brommafjorden is part of the Hallingdal River (Hallingdalselva). This is possibly the widest and most quiet part of the Hallingdal River. Brommafjorden was the site of Bromma station, a now-defunct rail station on the Bergen Railway. It was opened in 1907 when Bergen Railway was opened to Gulsvik and was operated until 1984.

== See also ==
- List of lakes in Norway
