= Jordalsvatnet =

Lake in Bergen, Norway

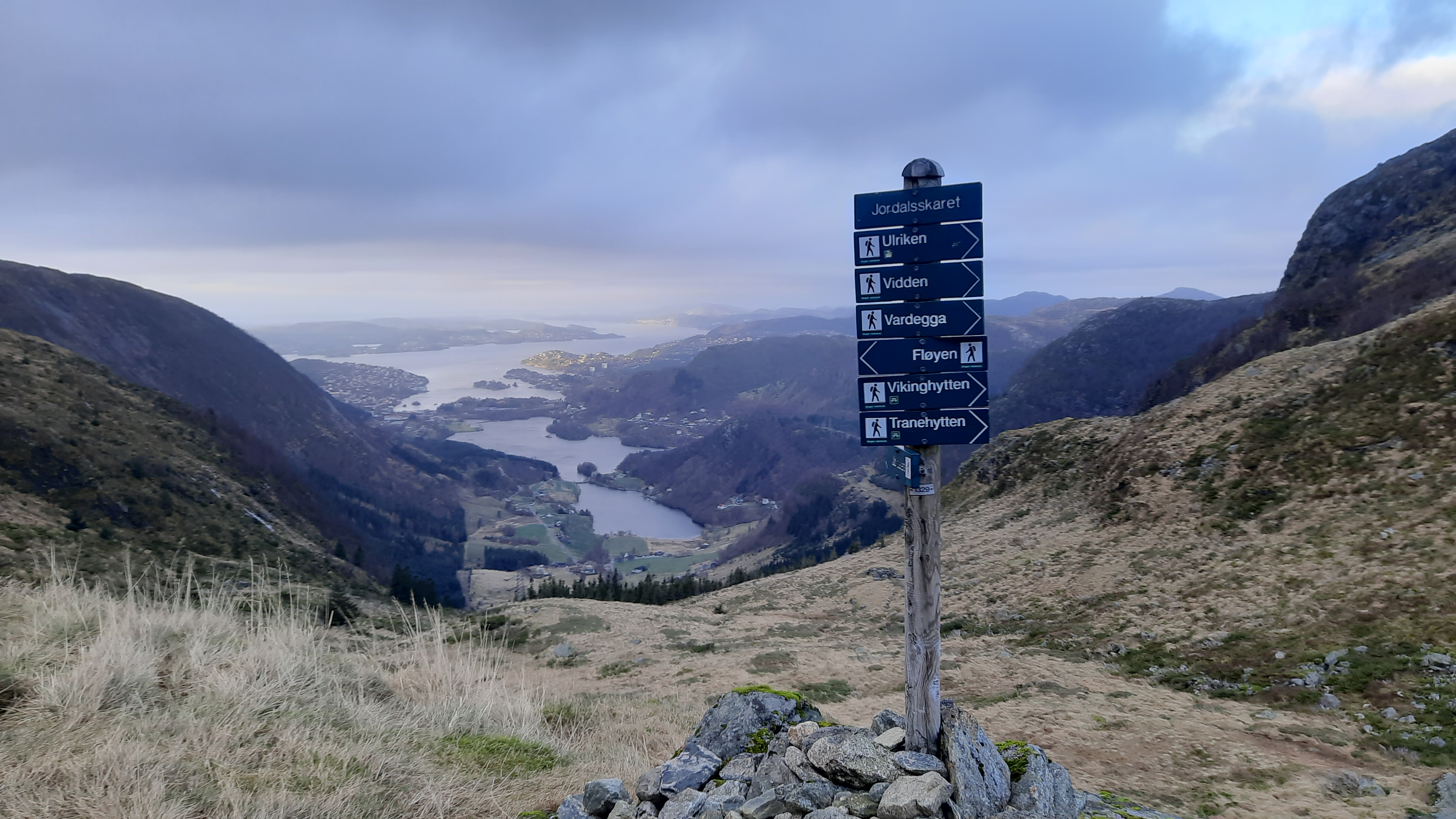
- View of the lake in the valley below
- Interactive map of Jordalsvatnet
- Location: Bergen Municipality, Vestland
- Coordinates: 60.43439°N 5.33739°E
- Basin countries: Norway
- Max. length: 1.5 kilometres (0.93 mi)
- Max. width: 550 metres (1,800 ft)
- Surface area: 0.57 km^{2} (0.22 sq mi)
- Surface elevation: 16 metres (52 ft)
- References: NVE

Jordalsvatnet is a lake in Bergen Municipality in Vestland county, Norway. The 0.57-square-kilometre (140-acre) artificial lake has a small dam on the western end and it is the main source of drinking water for the borough of Åsane (population: 40,000) in the city of Bergen, as well as the Ytre Sandviken parts of the neighboring Bergenhus borough. The lake lies east of the village of Eidsvåg, with the European route E39 highway running along the western shoreline. The surrounding valley of Jordalen is primarily agricultural in nature.

In May 2005, a new water treatment plant along the lake opened in order to improve the quality of the drinking water. The untreated water coming out of the lake is lower than in other drinking water sources in the Bergen area due to the agricultural activity in the Jordalen valley.

== See also ==
- List of lakes in Norway
