= Mangen =

Lake in Innlandet, Norway

- Mangensjøen
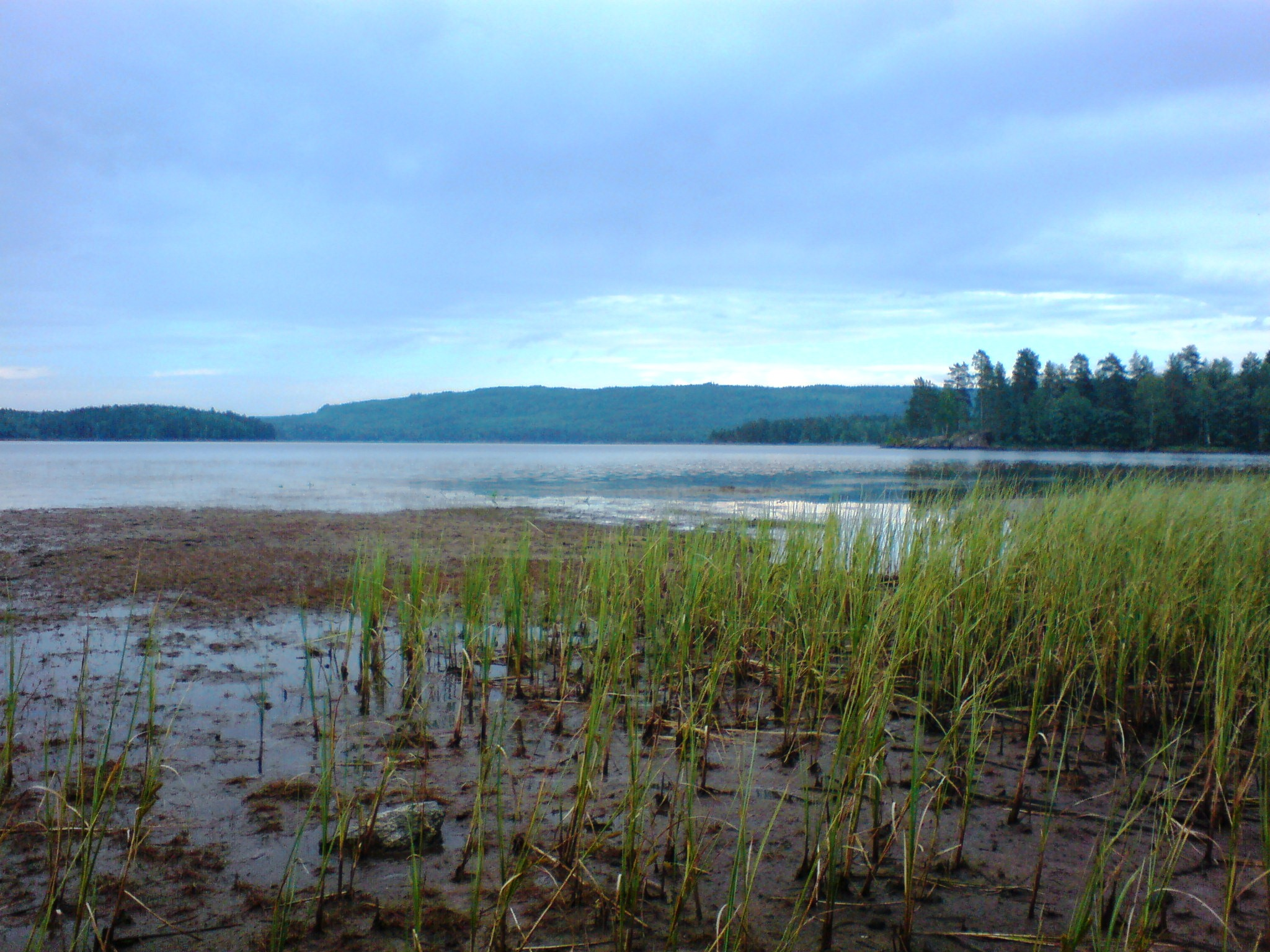
- View of the lake
- Interactive map of the lake
- Location: Eastern Norway
- Coordinates: 59°57′37″N 11°47′6″E
- Basin countries: Norway
- Max. length: 3.7 kilometres (2.3 mi)
- Max. width: 2 kilometres (1.2 mi)
- Surface area: 4.129 km^{2} (1.594 sq mi)
- Shore length^{1}: 14.97 kilometres (9.30 mi)
- Surface elevation: 194 metres (636 ft)
- References: NVE
- ^{1} Shore length is not a well-defined measure.

Mangen is a lake in eastern Norway. It is located in Eidskog Municipality in Innlandet county and Aurskog-Høland Municipality in Akershus county. The 4.1-square-kilometre (1.6 sq mi) lake lies about 20 kilometres (12 mi) northeast of the village of Aursmoen (in Aurskog-Høland Municipality) and about 20 kilometres (12 mi) west of the village of Skotterud (in Eidskog Municipality).

== See also ==
- List of lakes in Norway
