= Geitvatnet =

Lake in Nordland, Norway

- Interactive map of the lake
- Location: Nordland, Norway
- Coordinates: 68.1873°N 17.0422°E
- Basin countries: Norway
- Max. length: 5.3 kilometres (3.3 mi)
- Max. width: 2.5 kilometres (1.6 mi)
- Surface area: 9.87 km^{2} (3.81 sq mi)
- Shore length^{1}: 24.87 kilometres (15.45 mi)
- Surface elevation: 715 metres (2,346 ft)
- References: NVE
- ^{1} Shore length is not a well-defined measure.

Geitvatnet is a lake in Narvik Municipality in Nordland county, Norway. The lake lies just west of the lake Søndre Bukkevatnet and the lake Langvatnet lies to the south.

== See also ==
- List of lakes in Norway
