= Steinbusjøen =

Lake in Innlandet, Norway

- Interactive map of the lake
- Location: Vang Municipality, Innlandet
- Coordinates: 61°16′10″N 08°21′11″E
- Basin countries: Norway
- Max. length: 7.5 kilometres (4.7 mi)
- Max. width: 3.5 kilometres (2.2 mi)
- Surface area: 13.52 km^{2} (5.22 sq mi)
- Surface elevation: 1,211 metres (3,973 ft)
- References: NVE

Steinbusjøen is a lake in Vang Municipality in Innlandet county, Norway. It is located just east of the large lake Tyin. The lake is part of the Begna watershed and it is regulated as a reservoir for the Ylja hydroelectric power station.

The 13.52-square-kilometre (5.22 sq mi) lake has a shoreline measuring about 34.5 kilometres (21.4 mi) around. It lies at an elevation of 1,211 metres (3,973 ft) above sea level.

== See also ==
- List of lakes in Norway
