= Lyseren =

Lake in Norway

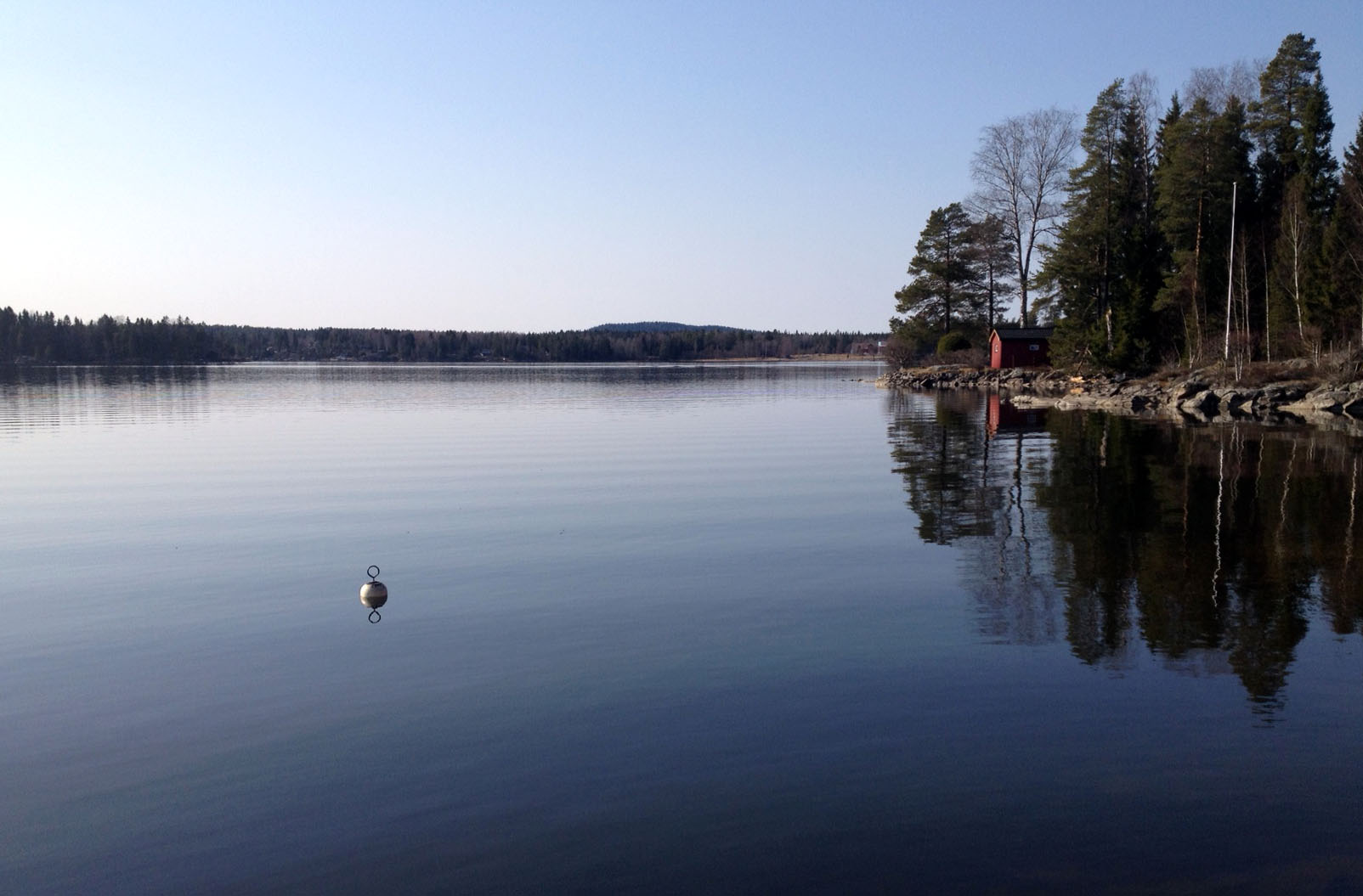

- Location within Norway
- Location: Enebakk (Akershus); Indre Østfold (Østfold)
- Coordinates: 59°41′56″N 11°7′12″E
- Basin countries: Norway
- Surface area: 7.00 km^{2} (2.70 sq mi)
- Shore length^{1}: 36.48 km (22.67 mi)
- Surface elevation: 161 m (528 ft)
- References: NVE
- ^{1} Shore length is not a well-defined measure.

Lyseren is a lake in the municipalities of Enebakk in Akershus county and Indre Østfold in Østfold county, Norway.

Lake Lyseren has a key role in the murder mystery unfolding in the Norwegian detective thriller "The Leopard". Some episodes in the book feature police detectives from cosmopolitan Oslo coming to conduct investigations in the rural environment of Lyseren.

== See also ==
- List of lakes in Norway
