= Lauvnesvatnet =

Lake in Sigdal, Norway

- Location within Norway
- Location: Sigdal, Flesberg (Buskerud)
- Coordinates: 59°58′17″N 9°35′43″E
- Basin countries: Norway
- Surface area: 2.28 km^{2} (0.88 sq mi)
- Shore length^{1}: 14.97 km (9.30 mi)
- Surface elevation: 366 m (1,201 ft)
- References: NVE
- ^{1} Shore length is not a well-defined measure.

Lauvnesvatnet is a fishing lake in the municipalities of Sigdal and Flesberg in Buskerud, Norway. It is located at an elevation of 366 meters above sea level. It forms part of the Drammensvassdraget watershed.

== See also ==
- List of lakes in Norway
