= Flakavatnet =

Lake in Norway

- Flakvatnet
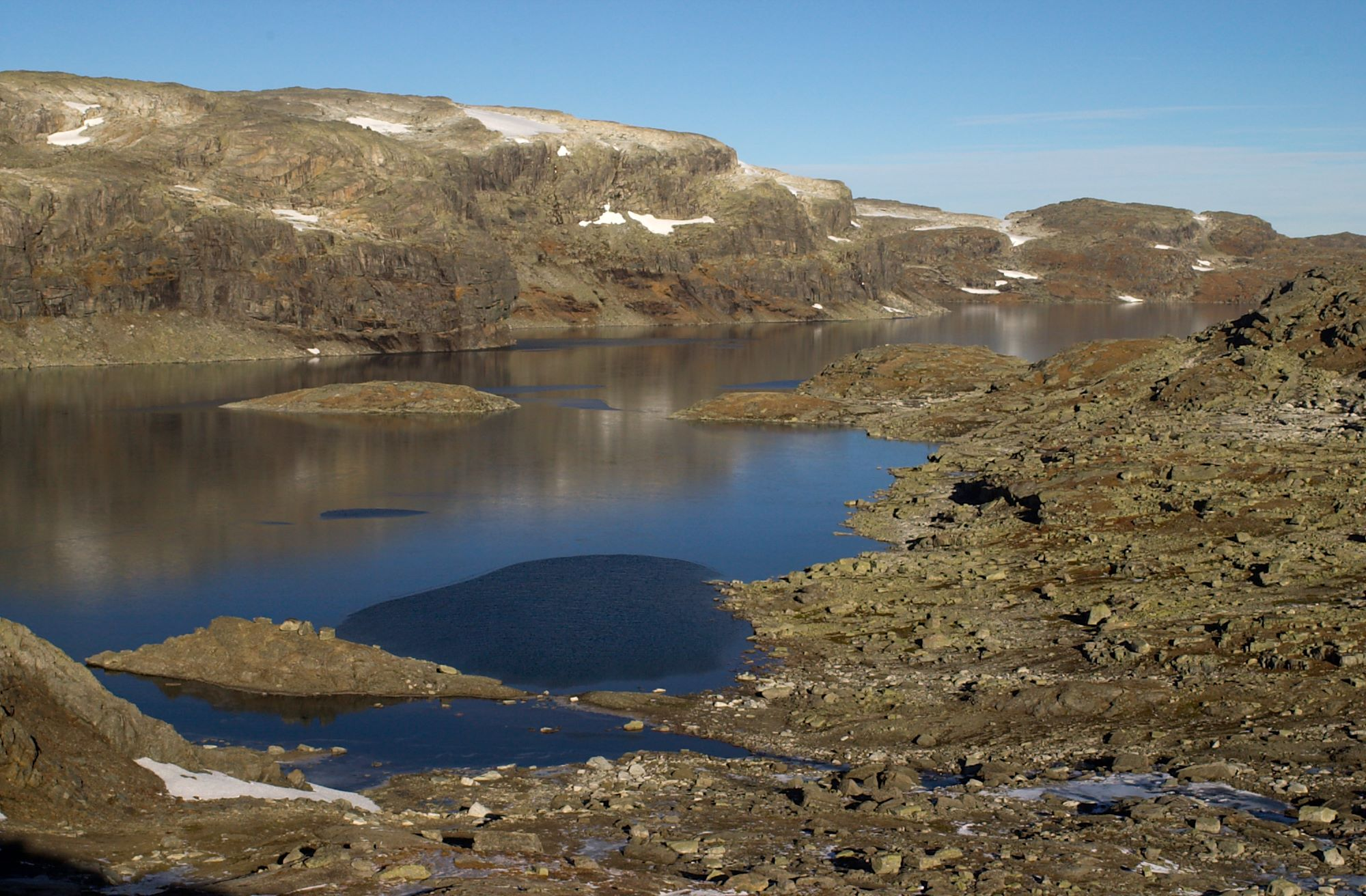
- View of the lake
- Interactive map of Flakavatnet
- Location: Ulvik, Vestland and Hol, Buskerud
- Coordinates: 60.6471°N 7.58948°E
- Basin countries: Norway
- Max. length: 4.5 kilometres (2.8 mi)
- Max. width: 2.1 kilometres (1.3 mi)
- Surface area: 3.43 km^{2} (1.32 sq mi)
- Max. depth: 75 metres (246 ft)
- Shore length^{1}: 16.47 kilometres (10.23 mi)
- Surface elevation: 1,453 metres (4,767 ft)
- References: NVE
- ^{1} Shore length is not a well-defined measure.

Flakavatnet is an alpine lake on the border of Vestland and Buskerud counties in Norway. The 3.43-square-kilometre (1.32 sq mi) lake lies in Ulvik Municipality (in Vestland) and Hol Municipality (in Buskerud) and the lake lies entirely within the Hallingskarvet National Park. The village of Finse lies about 5 kilometres (3.1 mi) southwest of the lake.

The maximum depth of the lake is 75 metres (246 ft). The lake freezes in the winter and sometimes the ice does not fully melt during the summer. The lake is one of the largest lakes in Europe that lies in the transition to the high-alpine zone, where vegetation is minimal or absent and influence of permanent snow patches and glaciers are evident.

== See also ==
- List of lakes in Norway
