= Nugguren =

Lake in Kongsvinger, Norway

- Interactive map of the lake
- Location: Kongsvinger, Innlandet
- Coordinates: 60°19′3″N 12°4′14″E
- Primary inflows: Skasåa river
- Primary outflows: Glomma river
- Basin countries: Norway
- Max. length: 5.8 kilometres (3.6 mi)
- Max. width: 1 kilometre (0.62 mi)
- Surface area: 4.15 km^{2} (1.60 sq mi)
- Shore length^{1}: 13.06 kilometres (8.12 mi)
- Surface elevation: 150 metres (490 ft)
- References: NVE
- ^{1} Shore length is not a well-defined measure.

Nugguren is a lake in Kongsvinger Municipality in Innlandet county, Norway. The 4.15-square-kilometre (1.60 sq mi) lake lies about 2.3 kilometres (1.4 mi) east of the village of Brandval. The lake flows out into a very short channel before emptying into the river Glomma.

== See also ==
- List of lakes in Norway
