= Ørsjøen =

Lake in Norway

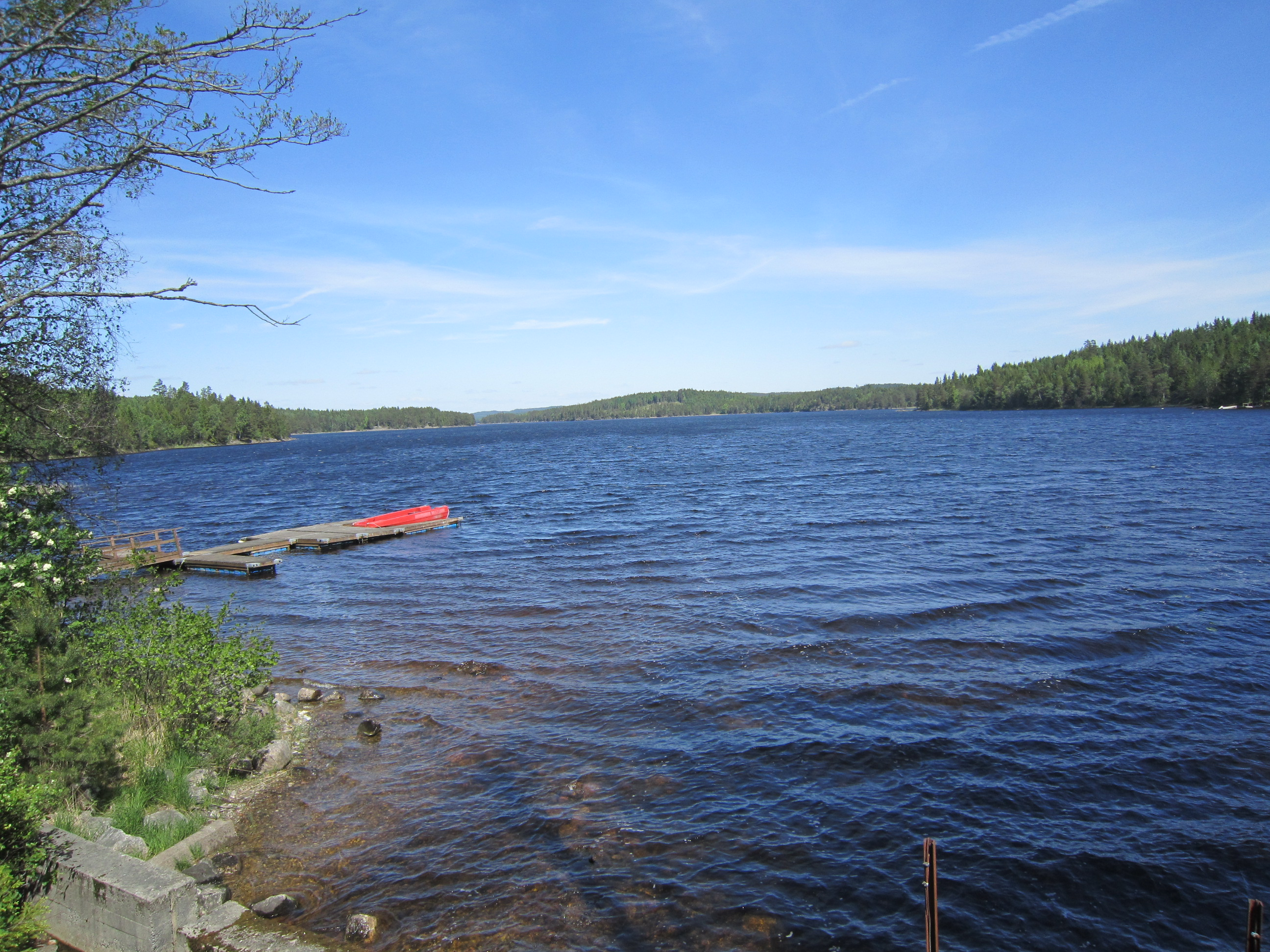

- Location within Østfold
- Location: Halden (Østfold)
- Coordinates: 59°01′29″N 11°33′33″E
- Basin countries: Norway
- Surface area: 6.35 km^{2} (2.45 sq mi)
- Shore length^{1}: 29.64 km (18.42 mi)
- Surface elevation: 142 m (466 ft)
- References: NVE
- ^{1} Shore length is not a well-defined measure.

Ørsjøen is a lake in the municipality of Halden in Østfold county, Norway.

== See also ==
- List of lakes in Norway
