= Store Erte =

Lake in Halden, Norway

- Location within Østfold
- Location: Halden (Østfold)
- Coordinates: 59°6′54″N 11°34′6″E
- Basin countries: Norway
- Surface area: 4.28 km^{2} (1.65 sq mi)
- Shore length^{1}: 18.39 km (11.43 mi)
- Surface elevation: 109 m (358 ft)
- References: NVE
- ^{1} Shore length is not a well-defined measure.

Store Erte is a lake in the municipality of Halden in Østfold county, Norway.

== See also ==
- List of lakes in Norway
