= Søndre Bukkevatnet =

Lake in Nordland, Norway

- Søre Bukkevatnet
- Interactive map of the lake
- Location: Nordland, Norway
- Coordinates: 68.1765°N 17.1091°E
- Basin countries: Norway
- Max. length: 2.1 kilometres (1.3 mi)
- Max. width: 2.3 kilometres (1.4 mi)
- Surface area: 2.49 km^{2} (0.96 sq mi)
- Shore length^{1}: 13.15 kilometres (8.17 mi)
- Surface elevation: 723 metres (2,372 ft)
- References: NVE
- ^{1} Shore length is not a well-defined measure.

Søndre Bukkevatnet is a lake in Narvik Municipality in Nordland county, Norway. Søndre Bukkevannet is joined together with Nordre Bukkevatnet via a natural canal. The lake Geitvatnet lies immediately to the west of this lake.

== See also ==
- List of lakes in Norway
