= Saglivatnet =

Lake in Trøndelag and Nordland, Norway

- Interactive map of the lake
- Location: Trøndelag and Nordland
- Coordinates: 65°2′34″N 12°2′5″E
- Primary outflows: River Saglielva
- Basin countries: Norway
- Max. length: 3.7 kilometres (2.3 mi)
- Max. width: 1 kilometre (0.62 mi)
- Surface area: 2.16 km^{2} (0.83 sq mi)
- Shore length^{1}: 13.22 kilometres (8.21 mi)
- Surface elevation: 51 metres (167 ft)
- References: NVE
- ^{1} Shore length is not a well-defined measure.

Saglivatnet is a lake on the border of Trøndelag and Nordland counties in Norway. The 2.16-square-kilometre (0.83 sq mi) lake lies on the border of Nærøysund Municipality (in Trøndelag county) and Bindal Municipality (in Nordland county). The water flows out to the north into the river Saglielva which flows into the Sørfjorden, an arm off the main Bindalsfjorden.

== See also ==
- List of lakes in Norway
- Geography of Norway
