= Vestre Bjonevatnet =

Lake in Buskerud and Innlandet, Norway

- Interactive map of the lake
- Location: Buskerud and Innlandet
- Coordinates: 60°31′24″N 10°7′37″E
- Basin countries: Norway
- Max. length: 4 kilometres (2.5 mi)
- Max. width: 1.3 kilometres (0.81 mi)
- Surface area: 2.16 km^{2} (0.83 sq mi)
- Max. depth: 72 metres (236 ft)
- Shore length^{1}: 15 kilometres (9.3 mi)
- Surface elevation: 229 metres (751 ft)
- References: NVE
- ^{1} Shore length is not a well-defined measure.

Vestre Bjonevatnet is a small lake in Norway. The 2.16-square-kilometre (0.83 sq mi) lake is located primarily in Ringerike Municipality in Buskerud county and the far northern tip of the lake stretches across the border into Søndre Land Municipality and Gran Municipality in Innlandet county. The lake is situated between the lakes Sperillen and Randsfjorden. The European route E16 highway runs north–south, about 2 kilometres (1.2 mi) to the west of the lake.

== See also ==
- List of lakes in Norway
