= Inner-Sildvikvatnet =

Lake in Nordland, Norway

Inner-Sildvikvatnet (Norwegian) Ruoidnajávri (Northern Sami)
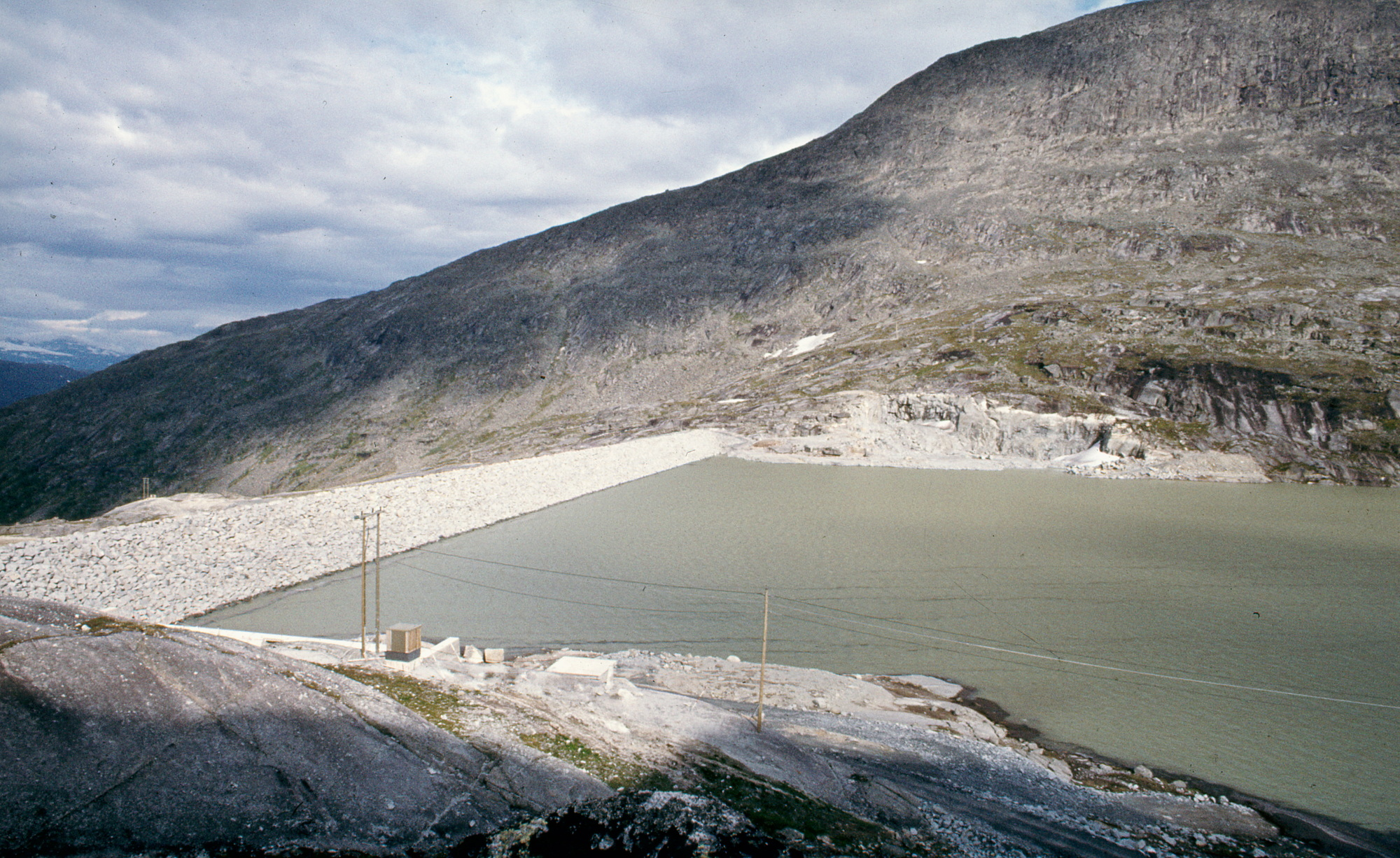
- Interactive map of the lake
- Location: Nordland
- Coordinates: 68.3655°N 17.8636°E
- Basin countries: Norway
- Max. length: 3.3 kilometres (2.1 mi)
- Max. width: 800 metres (2,600 ft)
- Surface area: 2.29 km^{2} (0.88 sq mi)
- Shore length^{1}: 8.11 kilometres (5.04 mi)
- Surface elevation: 654 metres (2,146 ft)
- References: NVE
- ^{1} Shore length is not a well-defined measure.

Inner-Sildvikvatnet (Norwegian) or Ruoidnajávri (Northern Sami) (or unofficially: Indre Sildvikvatnet) is a lake in Narvik Municipality in Nordland county, Norway. The 2.29-square-kilometre (0.88 sq mi) lake lies south of the Rombaken fjord. The lake has a dam on the northern end and the water is used for hydroelectric power production.

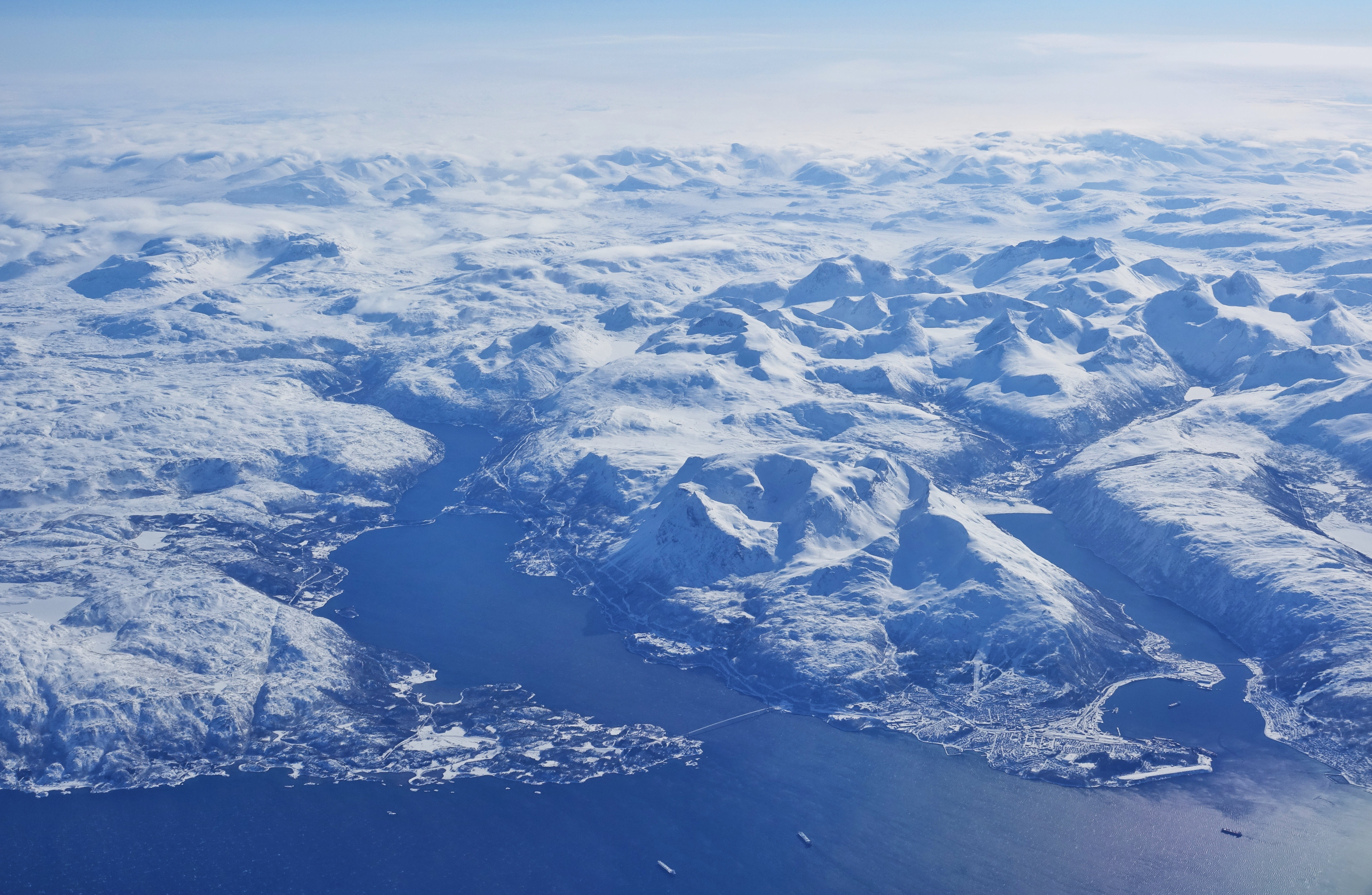
Rombaken fjord left and Beis Fjord right, in the middle in the mountains the lake Inner-Sildvikvatnet (covered with snow)

== See also ==
- List of lakes in Norway
