= Iptojávri =

Lake in Nordland, Norway

- Interactive map of the lake
- Location: Nordland
- Coordinates: 68.1236°N 17.4757°E
- Basin countries: Norway
- Max. length: 2.7 kilometres (1.7 mi)
- Max. width: 1.4 kilometres (0.87 mi)
- Surface area: 2.31 km^{2} (0.89 sq mi)
- Shore length^{1}: 9.43 kilometres (5.86 mi)
- Surface elevation: 616 metres (2,021 ft)
- References: NVE
- ^{1} Shore length is not a well-defined measure.

Iptojávri is a lake in Narvik Municipality in Nordland county, Norway. The 2.31-square-kilometre (0.89 sq mi) lake lies about 15 kilometres (9.3 mi) south of the village of Elvegård, just 3 kilometres (1.9 mi) from the border with Sweden. The ending -jávri is the word for "lake" in the Northern Sami language.

== See also ==
- List of lakes in Norway
