= Steinslandsvatnet =

Lake in Vestland, Norway

- Steinslandsvatn
- Interactive map of Steinslandsvatnet
- Location: Modalen Municipality, Vestland
- Coordinates: 60.90639°N 5.97081°E
- Basin countries: Norway
- Max. length: 7.4 kilometres (4.6 mi)
- Max. width: 600 metres (2,000 ft)
- Surface area: 2.4 km^{2} (0.93 sq mi)
- Shore length^{1}: 14.07 kilometres (8.74 mi)
- Surface elevation: 117 metres (384 ft)
- References: NVE
- ^{1} Shore length is not a well-defined measure.

Steinslandsvatnet is a lake in Modalen Municipality in Vestland county, Norway. The 2.4-square-kilometre (0.93 sq mi) lake is the headwaters of the river Moelva in the center of the Modalen valley. The village of Øvre Helland lies at the southern end of the lake. The Norwegian county road 5412 runs along the western shoreline of the lake.

== See also ==
- List of lakes in Norway
