= Torfinnsvatnet =

Lake in Voss, Norway

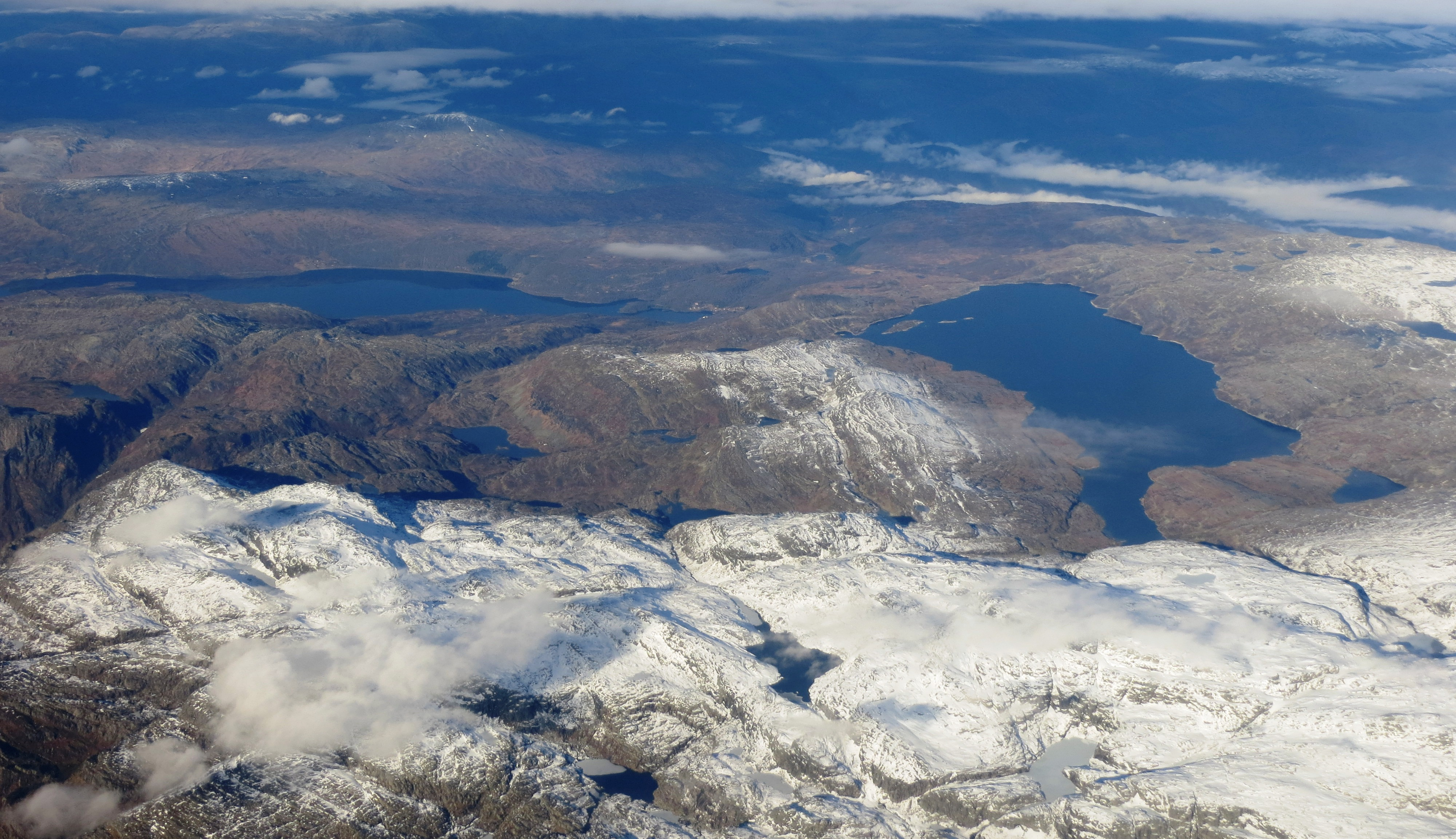
- View of the lake (right side, Hamlagrøvatnet is on the left)
- Interactive map of Torfinnsvatnet
- Location: Voss Municipality, Vestland
- Coordinates: 60.5493°N 6.2664°E
- Basin countries: Norway
- Max. length: 6 kilometres (3.7 mi)
- Max. width: 2 kilometres (1.2 mi)
- Surface area: 6.41 km^{2} (2.47 sq mi)
- Shore length^{1}: 14 kilometres (8.7 mi)
- Surface elevation: 897 metres (2,943 ft)
- References: NVE
- ^{1} Shore length is not a well-defined measure.

Torfinnsvatnet is a lake in Voss Municipality in Vestland county, Norway. The 6.41 square kilometres (2.47 sq mi) lake lies about 1.7 kilometres (1.1 mi) east of the lake Hamlagrøvatnet. The lake has a dam on the west side, which keeps the water level regulated for the local hydroelectric power plants. The river Torfinno connects the lake to the nearby lake Hamlagrøvatnet.

== See also ==
- List of lakes in Norway
