= Bjornesfjorden =

Lake in Norway

- Location within Buskerud
- Location: Nore og Uvdal (Buskerud)
- Coordinates: 60°10′12″N 7°39′17″E
- Basin countries: Norway
- Surface area: 18.55 km^{2} (7.16 sq mi)
- Shore length^{1}: 68.10 km (42.32 mi)
- Surface elevation: 1,223 m (4,012 ft)
- References: NVE
- ^{1} Shore length is not a well-defined measure.

Bjornesfjorden is a lake in the municipality of Nore og Uvdal in Buskerud county, Norway. It lies at 1,223 meters above sea level. It is drained by the Numedalslågen. Bjornesfjorden is situated in the Hardangervidda plateau and lies within the Hardangervidda National Park.

== See also ==
- List of lakes in Norway
