= Ormsetvatnet =

Lake in Trøndelag, Norway

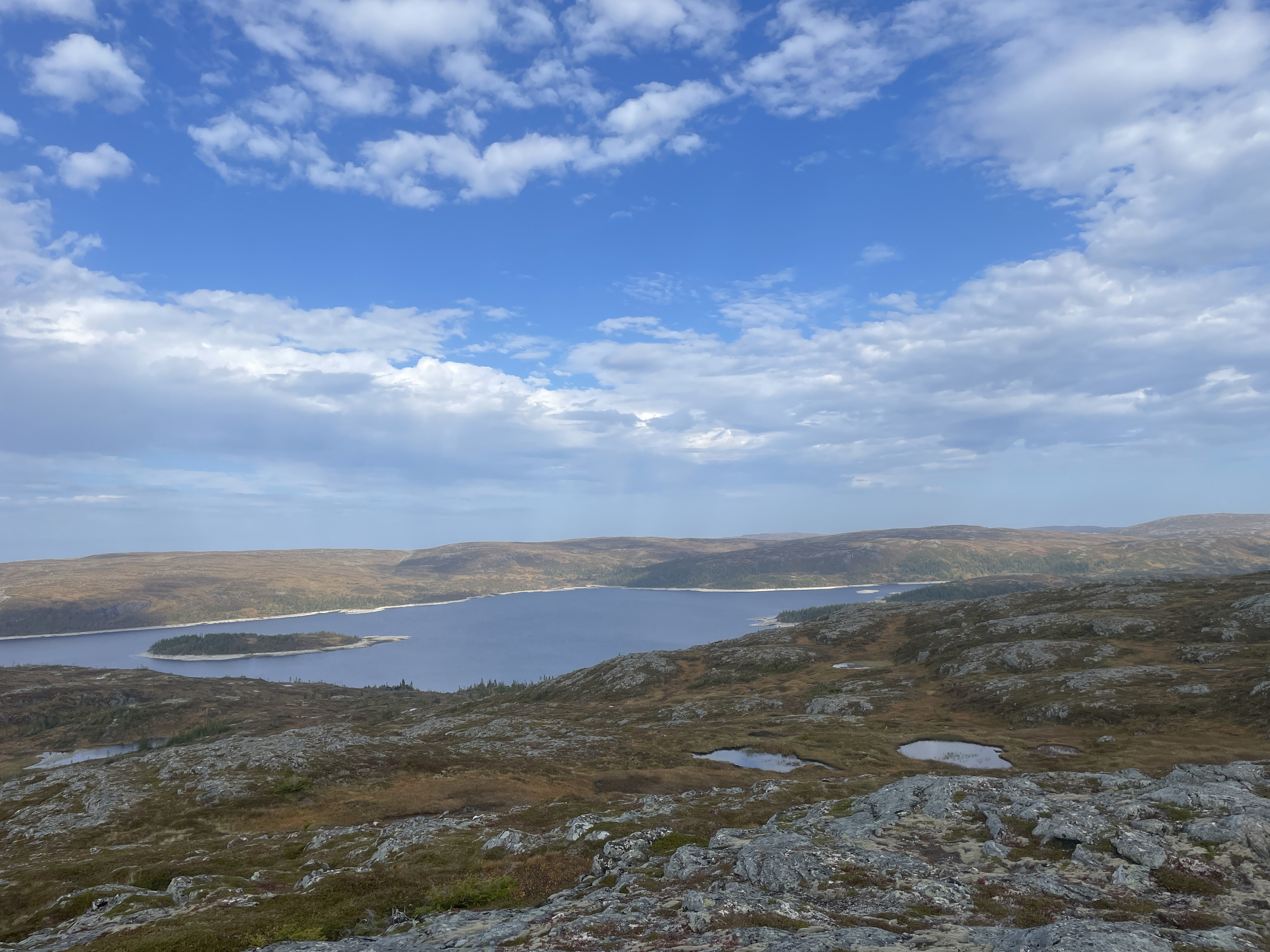
- Interactive map of the lake
- Location: Steinkjer Municipality, Trøndelag
- Coordinates: 63.8879°N 10.6729°E
- Primary outflows: Moldelva river
- Basin countries: Norway
- Max. length: 3.5 kilometres (2.2 mi)
- Max. width: 3.5 kilometres (2.2 mi)
- Surface area: 4.27 km^{2} (1.65 sq mi)
- Shore length^{1}: 14.7 kilometres (9.1 mi)
- Surface elevation: 375 metres (1,230 ft)
- References: NVE
- ^{1} Shore length is not a well-defined measure.

Ormsetvatnet is a lake in Steinkjer Municipality in Trøndelag county, Norway. It is located about 10 kilometres (6.2 mi) northeast of the village of Verrabotn. The 4.27-square-kilometre (1.65 sq mi) lake has a dam at the southern end, the water flows out into the short river Moldelva which flows out into an arm of the Trondheimsfjord.

== See also ==
- List of lakes in Norway
