= Vavatn =

Lake in Hemsedal, Norway

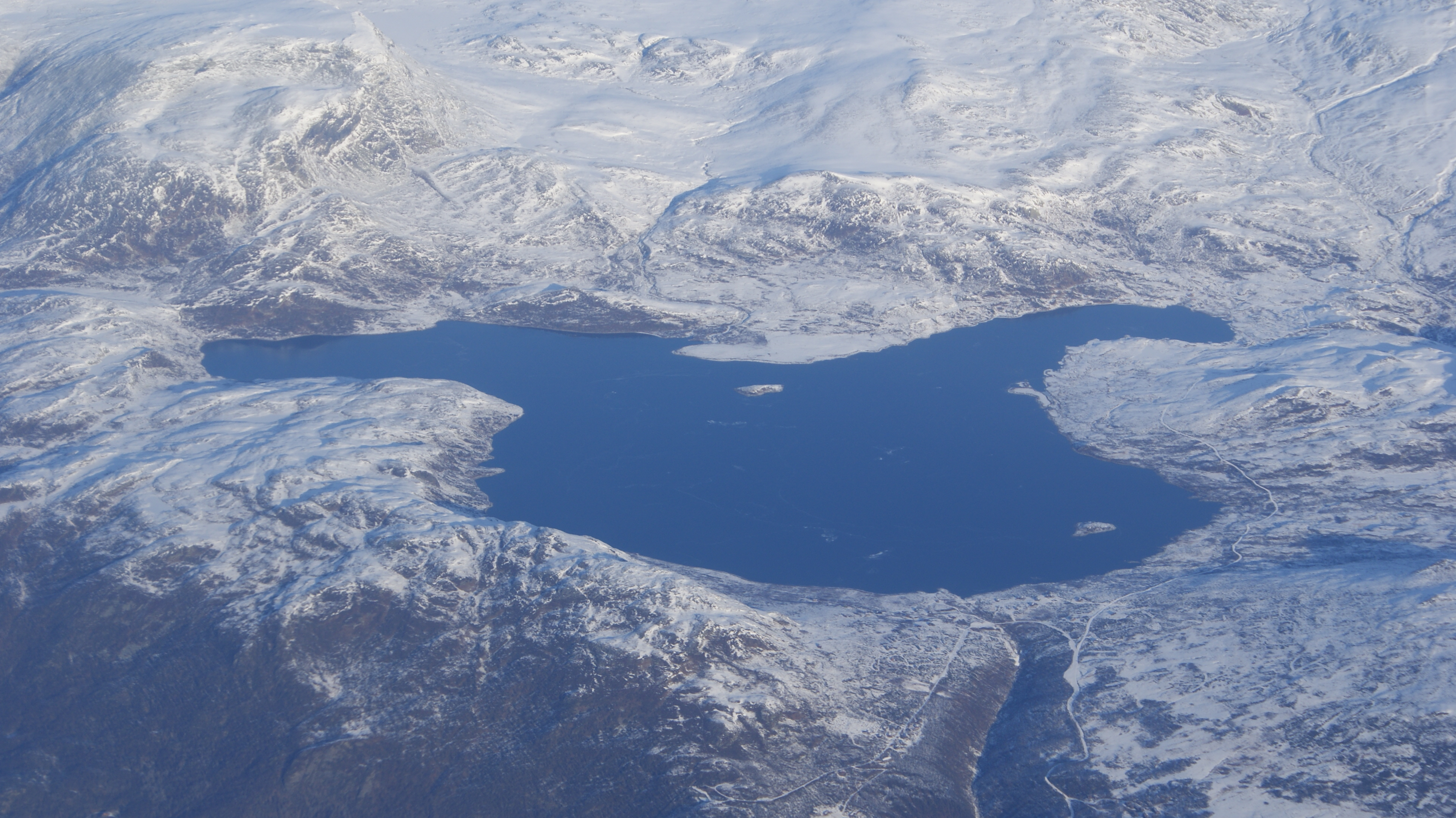

- Location within Buskerud Location within Norway
- Location: Hemsedal (Buskerud)
- Coordinates: 60°57′41″N 8°26′1″E
- Basin countries: Norway
- Surface area: 4.86 km^{2} (1.88 sq mi)
- Shore length^{1}: 13.81 km (8.58 mi)
- Surface elevation: 1,124 m (3,688 ft)
- References: NVE
- ^{1} Shore length is not a well-defined measure.

Vavatn is a lake in the municipality of Hemsedal in Buskerud county, Norway. It is a water source for Gjuva kraftverk, a hydro-electric power plant, which utilizes the waterfall from the lake into the Gjuva river as it enters the valley of Grøndalen. The power station was put into operation in 1957 but was rehabilitated in 1995. The owner-operator is E- CO Energi.

== See also ==
- List of lakes in Norway
