= Svartediket =

Lake in Bergen, Norway

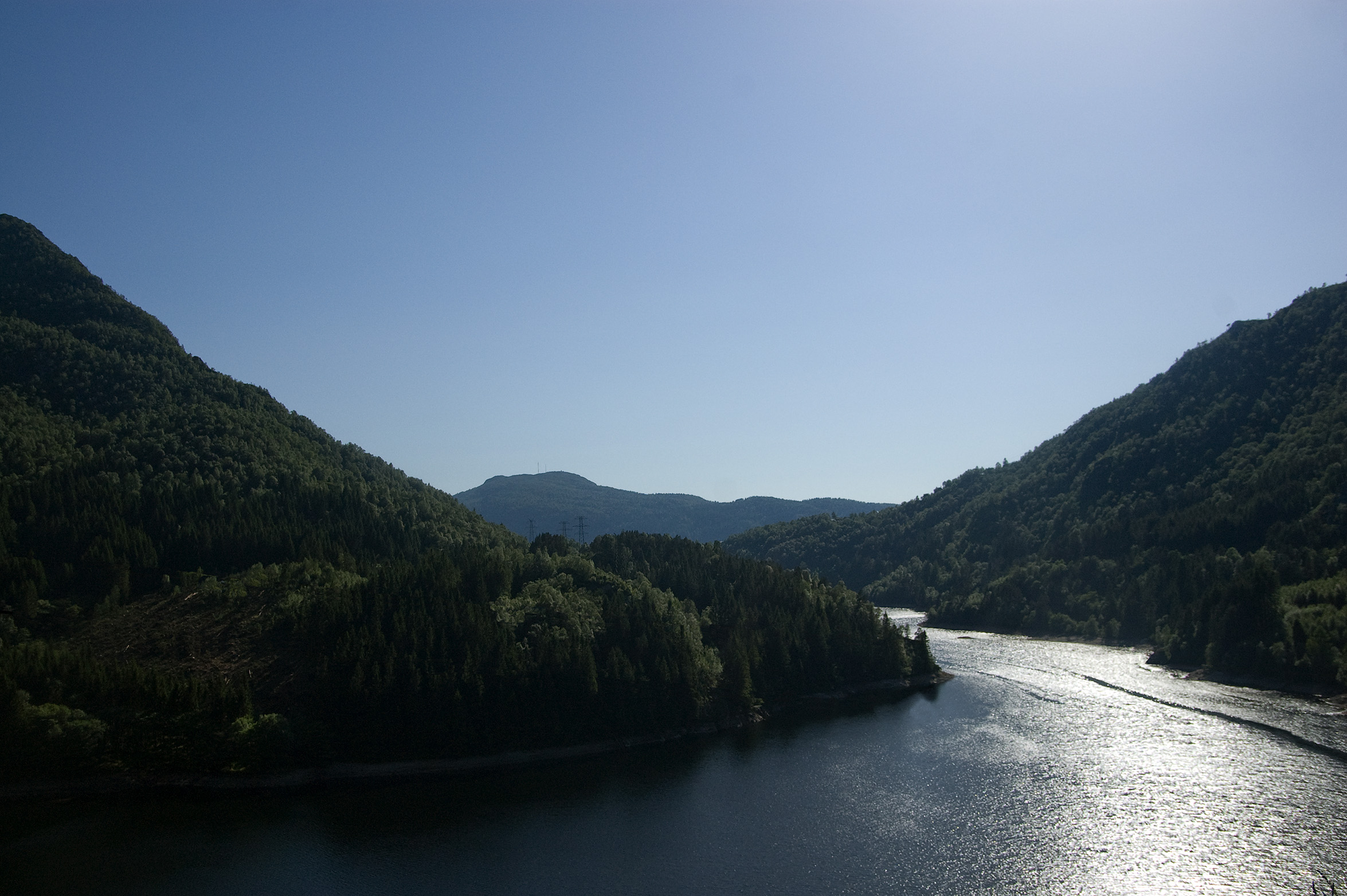
- View of Svartediket
- Interactive map of Svartediket
- Location: Bergen Municipality, Vestland
- Coordinates: 60.38754°N 5.36775°E
- Basin countries: Norway
- Max. length: 1.4 kilometres (0.87 mi)
- Max. width: 500 metres (1,600 ft)
- Surface area: 0.5 km^{2} (0.19 sq mi)
- Surface elevation: 76 metres (249 ft)
- References: NVE

Svartediket is a lake in Bergen Municipality in Vestland county, Norway. It lies about 3 kilometres (1.9 mi) east of the centre of the city of Bergen. The 0.5-square-kilometre (0.19 sq mi) lake lies immediately north of the mountain Ulriken, northeast of the Store Lungegårdsvannet bay. Historically, this lake was called Ålrekstadsvannet, but in the late 19th century, a dam was built on the south end of the lake to create a reservoir for the city's drinking water.

== Reservoir ==
The lake is the main source of drinking water for the central parts of the city of Bergen. There is a pumping station and treatment facility built adjacent to the lake inside the mountain Ulriken. Drinking water is collected at a 28-metre (92 ft) depth in Svartediket. Inside the water treatment plant, the water is filtered and irradiated with UV light to kill harmful microorganisms. After treatment, the clean drinking water is stored in a 15,000-cubic-metre (530,000 cu ft) large water pool inside the mountain. This is the water that is pumped down to the city center for drinking water. In 2004, Bergen was hit by a Giardia lamblia epidemic which had its source in the lake Svartediket. The water treatment facility was upgraded in 2007.

== See also ==
- List of lakes in Norway
