= Langesjøen =

Lake in Nore og Uvdal, Norway

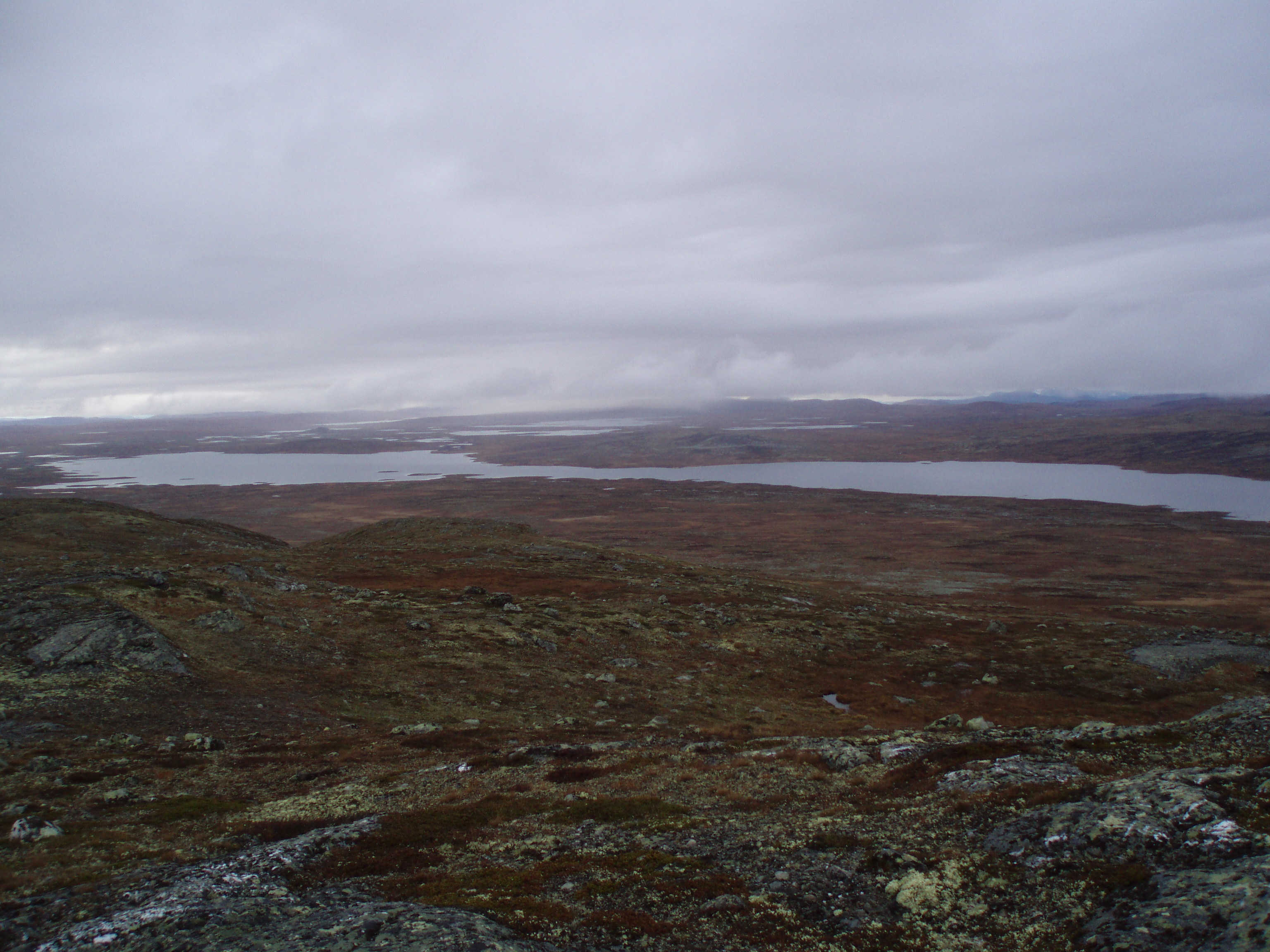
- Western part of Langesjøen in Hardangervidda

- Location within Norway
- Location: Nore og Uvdal (Buskerud)
- Coordinates: 60°14′7″N 7°41′59″E
- Primary outflows: Numedalslågen
- Basin countries: Norway
- Max. length: 12 km (7.5 mi)
- Max. width: 1.6 km (0.99 mi)
- Surface area: 10.78 km^{2} (4.16 sq mi)
- Shore length^{1}: 35.15 km (21.84 mi)
- Surface elevation: 1,206 m (3,957 ft)
- References: NVE
- ^{1} Shore length is not a well-defined measure.

Langesjøen is a lake in the municipality of Nore og Uvdal in Buskerud, Norway. Langesjøen is located ln Hardangervidda. Djupa flows out of Langesjøen to form part of the Numedalslågen watershed (Numedalsvassdraget).

== See also ==
- List of lakes in Norway
