= Møkeren =

Lake in Kongsvinger, Norway

- Interactive map of the lake
- Location: Kongsvinger Municipality, Innlandet
- Coordinates: 60°10′52″N 12°22′24″E
- Basin countries: Norway
- Max. length: 8.5 kilometres (5.3 mi)
- Max. width: 5 kilometres (3.1 mi)
- Surface area: 12.77 km^{2} (4.93 sq mi)
- Max. depth: 44 metres (144 ft)
- Shore length^{1}: 44.4 kilometres (27.6 mi)
- Surface elevation: 176 metres (577 ft)
- References: NVE
- ^{1} Shore length is not a well-defined measure.

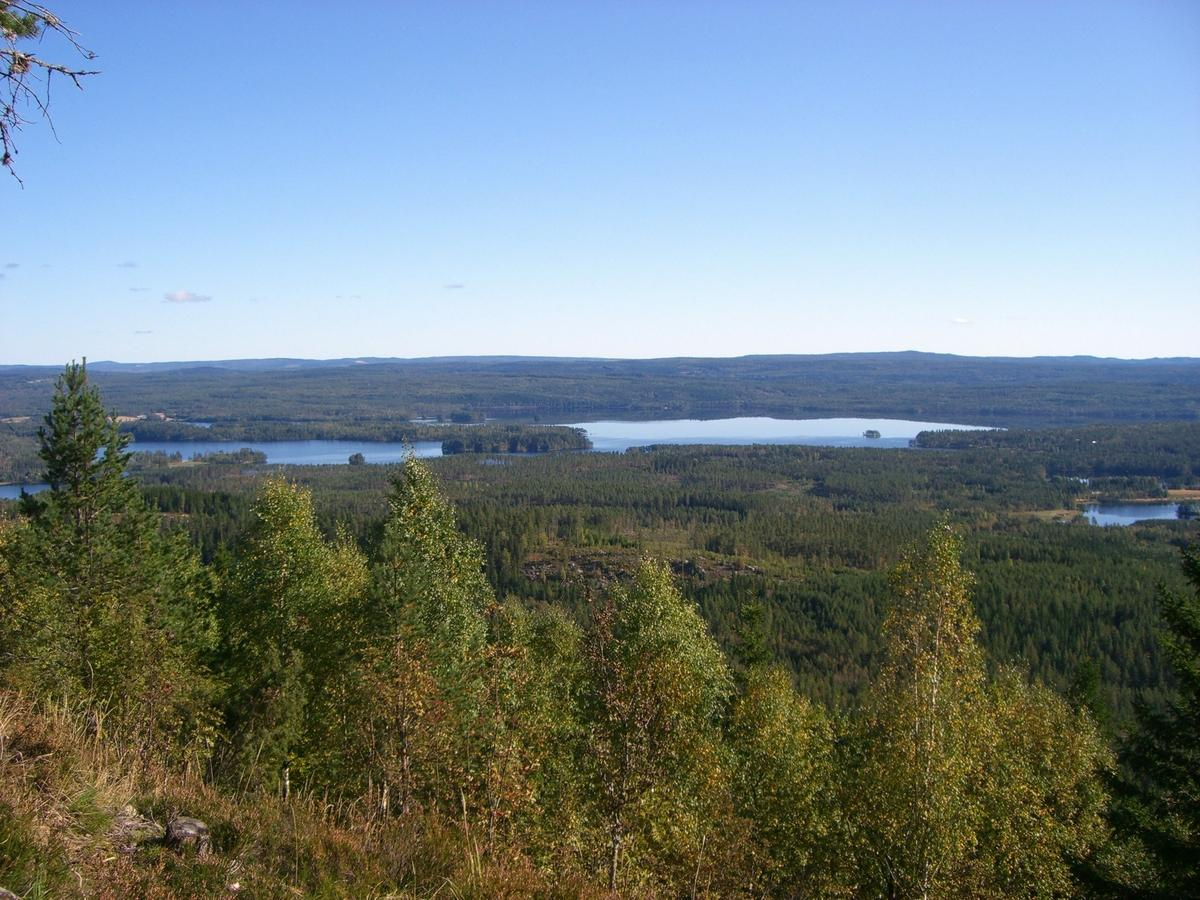
Møkeren seen from Dronningens utsik

Møkeren is a lake in Kongsvinger Municipality in Innlandet county, Norway. The 12.77-square-kilometre (4.93 sq mi) lake lies in the Finnskogen area which is a hilly, forested area that runs along the border with Sweden. The European route E16 highway runs along the west side of the lake.

== See also ==
- List of lakes in Norway
