= Nyhellervatnet =

Lake in Hol and Aurland, Norway

- Interactive map of Nyhellervatnet
- Location: Buskerud/Vestland border
- Coordinates: 60.81278°N 7.68194°E
- Basin countries: Norway
- Surface area: 16.74 km^{2} (6.46 sq mi)
- Shore length^{1}: 48 kilometres (30 mi)
- Surface elevation: 1,438 metres (4,718 ft)
- References: NVE
- ^{1} Shore length is not a well-defined measure.

Nyhellervatnet is a lake in Norway. It is located on the border of Hol Municipality in Buskerud county and Aurland Municipality in Vestland county. The 16.74-square-kilometre (6.46 sq mi) lake sits at an elevation of 1,438 metres (4,718 ft) above sea level. The lake is located about 30 kilometres (19 mi) southeast of the village of Aurlandsvangen (in Vestland county), at the end of the Aurlandsdalen valley. In neighboring Buskerud county, the lake Djupsvatnet lies 10 kilometres (6.2 mi) to the east and Hallingskarvet National Park lies 10 kilometres (6.2 mi) to the south.

== See also ==
- List of lakes in Norway
