= Kalandsvatnet =

Lake in Norway

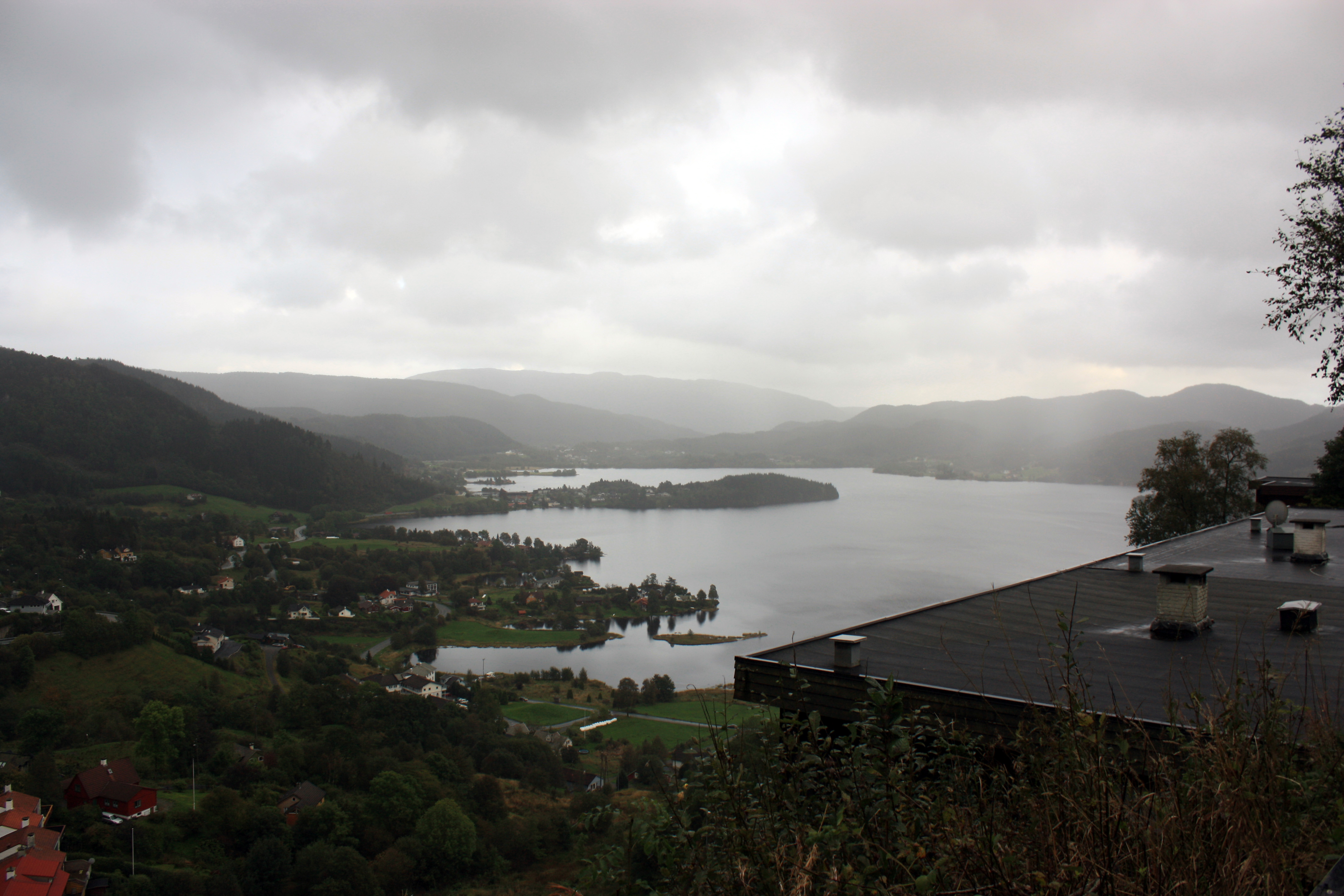
- Interactive map of Kalandsvatnet
- Location: Bergen Municipality, Vestland
- Coordinates: 60.27403°N 5.39483°E
- Basin countries: Norway
- Max. length: 3 kilometres (1.9 mi)
- Max. width: 2.66 kilometres (1.65 mi)
- Surface area: 3.5 km^{2} (1.4 sq mi)
- Shore length^{1}: 12.39 kilometres (7.70 mi)
- Surface elevation: 53 metres (174 ft)
- References: NVE
- ^{1} Shore length is not a well-defined measure.

Kalandsvatnet is the largest lake in Bergen Municipality in Vestland county, Norway. The 3.5-square-kilometre (1.4 sq mi) lake is located in the borough of Fana, just east of the village of Fanahammeren. The European route E39 highway runs along the northeastern shore of the lake, about 12 kilometres (7.5 mi) south of the city centre of Bergen.

== See also ==
- List of lakes in Norway
