= Frøylandsvatnet (Sandnes) =

Lake in Sandnes, Norway

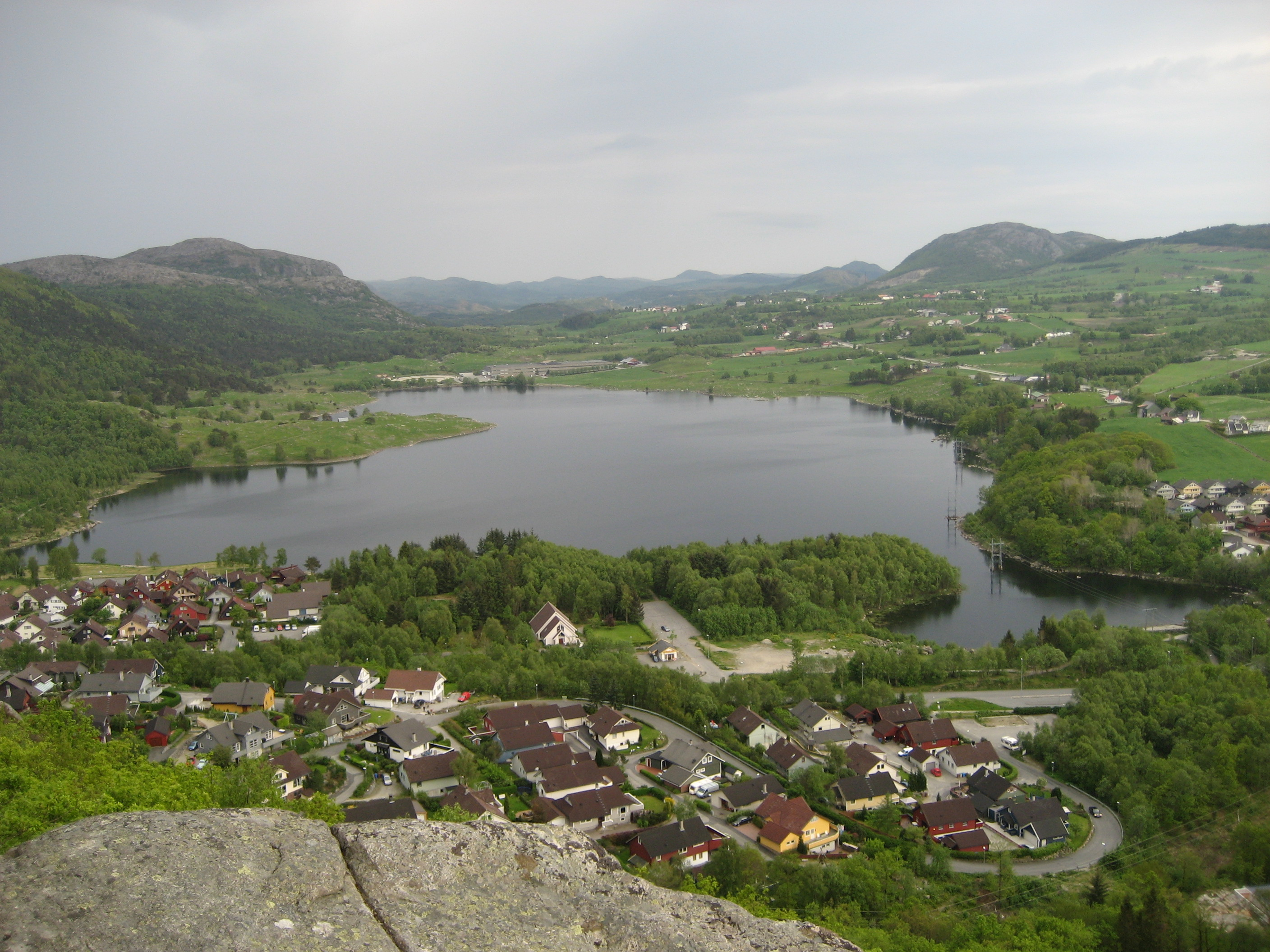
- Interactive map of Frøylandsvatnet
- Location: Sandnes Municipality, Rogaland
- Coordinates: 58.9147°N 5.86065°E
- Basin countries: Norway
- Max. length: 1.3 kilometres (0.81 mi)
- Max. width: 600 metres (2,000 ft)
- Surface area: 0.48 km^{2} (0.19 sq mi)
- Shore length^{1}: 3.67 kilometres (2.28 mi)
- Surface elevation: 43 metres (141 ft)
- References: NVE
- ^{1} Shore length is not a well-defined measure.

Frøylandsvatnet is a lake in Sandnes Municipality in Rogaland county, Norway. The 0.48-square-kilometre (120-acre) lake lies on the south side of the village of Hommersåk, about 10 kilometres (6.2 mi) northeast of the city of Sandnes. The lake empties into a small river that runs out of the north end of the lake. The river runs through Hommersåk into an arm of the Gandsfjorden.

== See also ==
- List of lakes in Norway
