= Østernvann =

Lake in Bærum, Norway

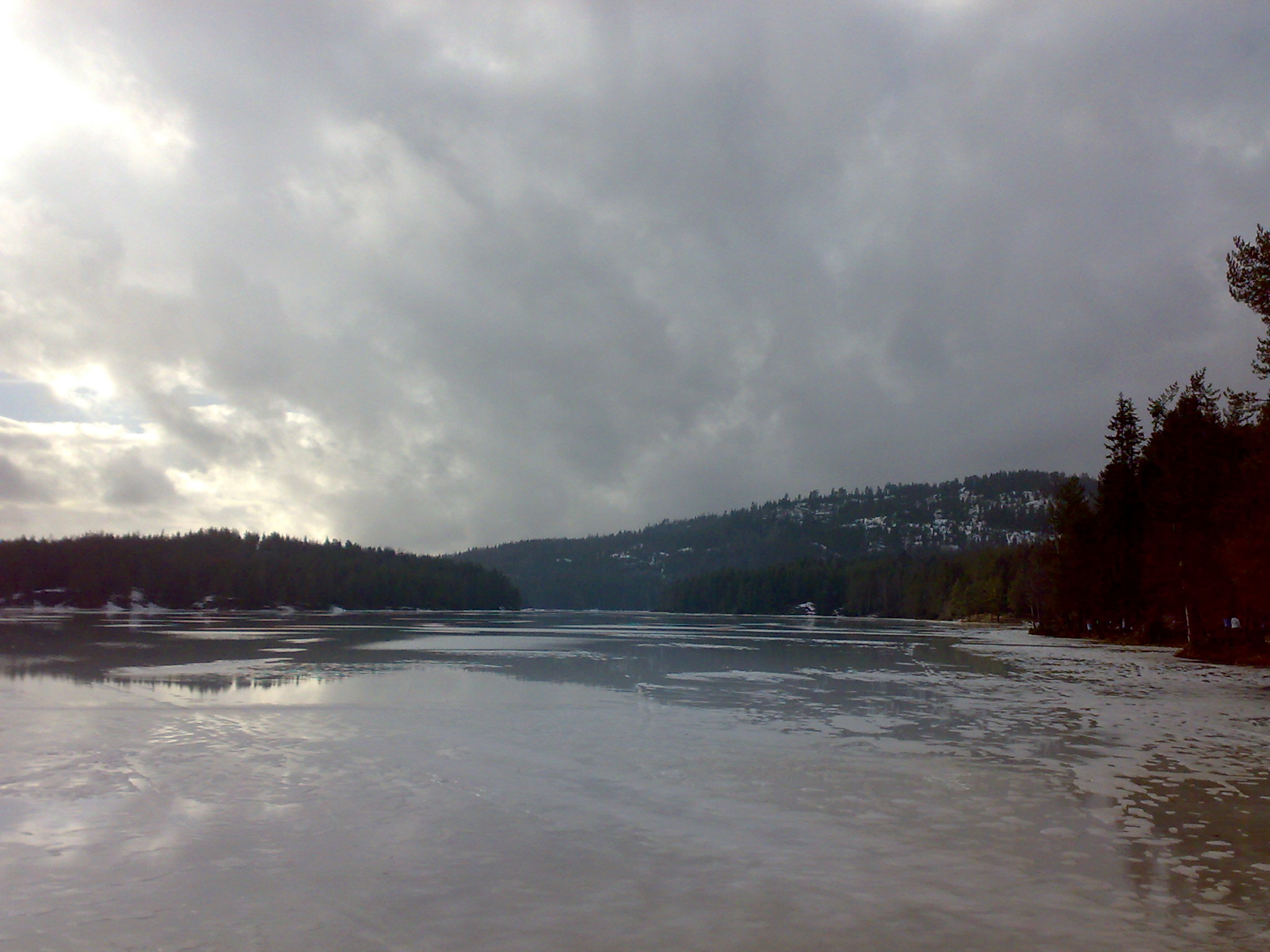

- Location within Akershus
- Location: Bærum, Akershus
- Coordinates: 59.969°N 10.588°E
- Basin countries: Norway

Østernvann is a lake north of Fossum in the municipality of Bærum in Akershus county, Norway.

== See also ==
- List of lakes in Norway
