= Vestvannet =

Lake in Sarpsborg, Norway

- Location within Østfold
- Location: Sarpsborg in Østfold
- Coordinates: 59°20′26″N 11°5′39″E
- Basin countries: Norway
- Surface area: 7.97 km^{2} (3.08 sq mi)
- Shore length^{1}: 43.05 km (26.75 mi)
- Surface elevation: 25 m (82 ft)
- References: NVE
- ^{1} Shore length is not a well-defined measure.

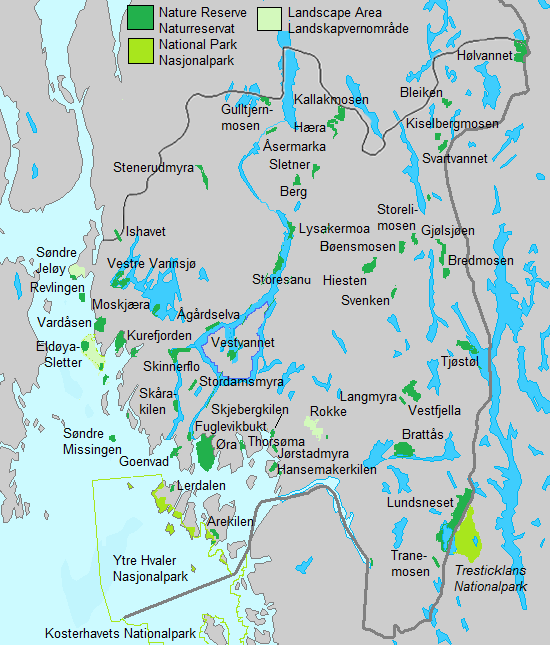
Vestvannet is located in a protected area of Ostfold

Vestvannet is a lake located within the municipality of Sarpsborg in Østfold county, Norway. The lower part of the lake is a protected area included in the Vestvannet Nature Reserve (Vestvannet naturreservat).

== See also ==
- List of lakes in Norway
