= Olefjorden =

Lake in Innlandet, Norway

- Olevatn
- Interactive map of the lake
- Location: Vang Municipality, Innlandet
- Coordinates: 61°18′13″N 8°38′40″E
- Basin countries: Norway
- Max. length: 7 kilometres (4.3 mi)
- Max. width: 1.5 kilometres (0.93 mi)
- Surface area: 6.2 km^{2} (2.4 sq mi)
- Max. depth: 62 metres (203 ft)
- Shore length^{1}: 25.54 kilometres (15.87 mi)
- Surface elevation: 1,005 metres (3,297 ft)
- References: NVE
- ^{1} Shore length is not a well-defined measure.

Olefjorden is a lake in Vang Municipality in Innlandet county, Norway. The 6.2-square-kilometre (2.4 sq mi) lake lies about 15 kilometres (9.3 mi) to the northwest of the village of Beitostølen. The large lake Bygdin lies about 2 kilometres (1.2 mi) to the north of this lake.

== See also ==
- List of lakes in Norway
