= Hallevannet =

Lake in Vestfold, Norway

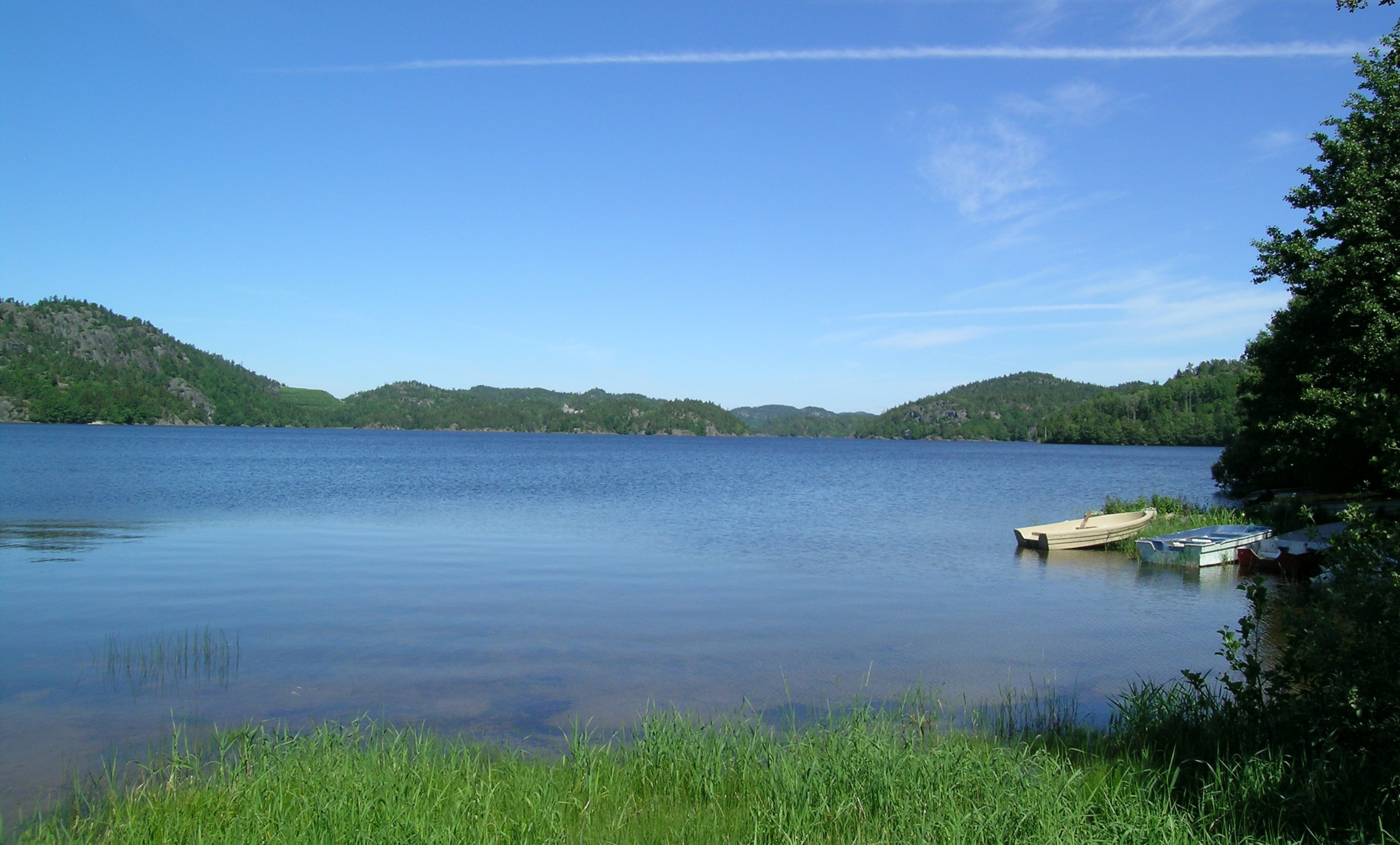
- Interactive map of Hallevannet
- Location: Larvik Municipality, Vestfold
- Coordinates: 59.02561°N 9.90727°E
- Basin countries: Norway
- Max. length: 5.9 kilometres (3.7 mi)
- Max. width: 4.8 kilometres (3.0 mi)
- Surface area: 3.72 km^{2} (1.44 sq mi)
- Shore length^{1}: 34 kilometres (21 mi)
- Surface elevation: 48 metres (157 ft)
- References: NVE
- ^{1} Shore length is not a well-defined measure.

Hallevannet is a lake in Larvik Municipality in Vestfold county, Norway. The 3.72-square-kilometre (1.44 sq mi) lake lies about 8 kilometres (5.0 mi) to the west of the town of Larvik and about 4 kilometres (2.5 mi) to the northeast of the village of Helgeroa. The European route E18 highway and the Vestfoldbanen railway line both pass along the northern end of the lake.

== See also ==
- List of lakes in Norway
