= Øgderen =

Lake in Aurskog-Høland (Akershus) and Trøgstad (Østfold), Norway

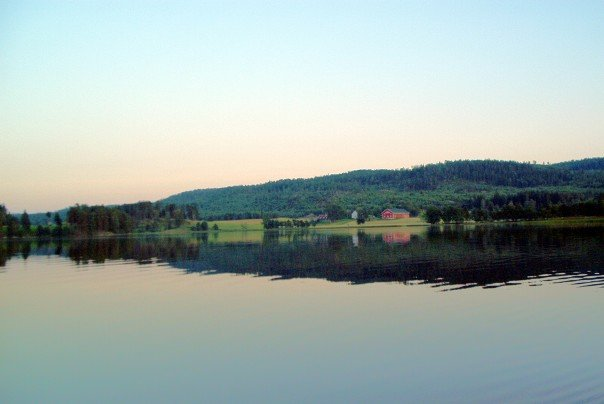

- Location within Akershus
- Location: Aurskog-Høland (Akershus); Trøgstad (Østfold)
- Coordinates: 59°41′46″N 11°25′52″E
- Basin countries: Norway
- Surface area: 12.80 km^{2} (4.94 sq mi)
- Shore length^{1}: 41.88 km (26.02 mi)
- Surface elevation: 133 m (436 ft)
- References: NVE
- ^{1} Shore length is not a well-defined measure.

Øgderen (also known as Hemnessjøen) is a lake in the municipalities of Aurskog-Høland in Akershus county and Trøgstad in Østfold county, Norway.

== See also ==
- List of lakes in Norway
