= Kravikfjorden =

Lake in Norway

- Location within Buskerud
- Location: Nore og Uvdal (Buskerud)
- Coordinates: 60°7′1″N 9°2′40″E
- Basin countries: Norway
- Surface area: 2.92 km^{2} (1.13 sq mi)
- Shore length^{1}: 15.31 km (9.51 mi)
- Surface elevation: 262 m (860 ft)
- References: NVE
- ^{1} Shore length is not a well-defined measure.

Kravikfjorden is a lake in the municipality of Nore og Uvdal in Buskerud county, Norway. It is a part of Numedalslågen.

== See also ==
- List of lakes in Norway
