= Rødungen =

Lake in Buskerud, Norway

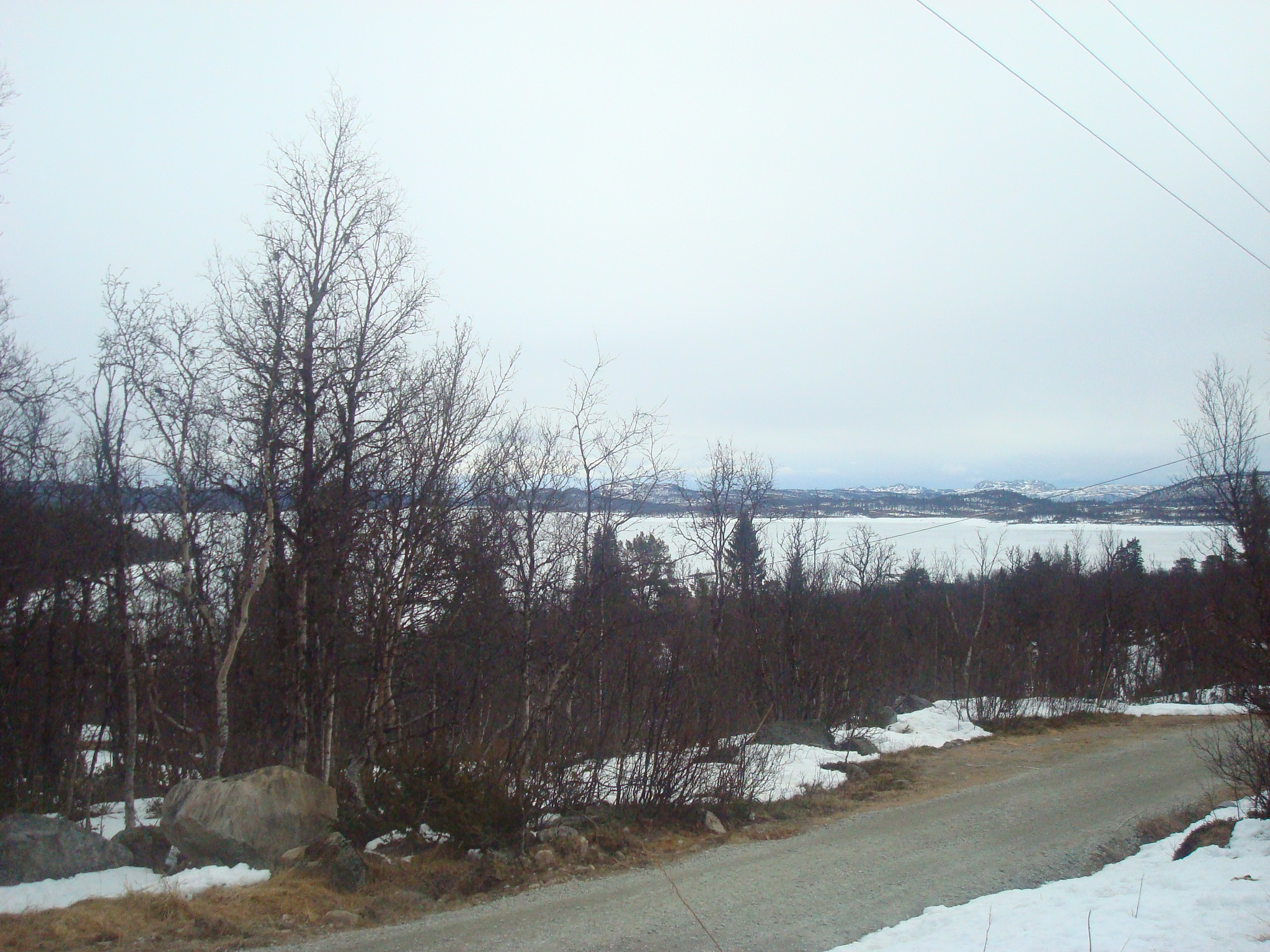

- Location within Norway
- Location: Ål, Nore og Uvdal (Buskerud)
- Coordinates: 60°29′57″N 8°38′4″E
- Basin countries: Norway
- Surface area: 13.10 km^{2} (5.06 sq mi)
- Shore length^{1}: 26.95 km (16.75 mi)
- Surface elevation: 957 m (3,140 ft)
- References: NVE
- ^{1} Shore length is not a well-defined measure.

Rødungen is a lake in Buskerud County, Norway. The lake is located on the border between the municipalities of Ål and Nore og Uvdal. Waterfall from the lake is a power source for Usta kraftverk, a hydro-electric plant. The power station exploits the fall of the Usta River from Rødungen as well as Ustevatn. The plant started production in 1965 and is owned and operated by E- CO Energi.
