= Aspern (lake) =

Lake in Norway

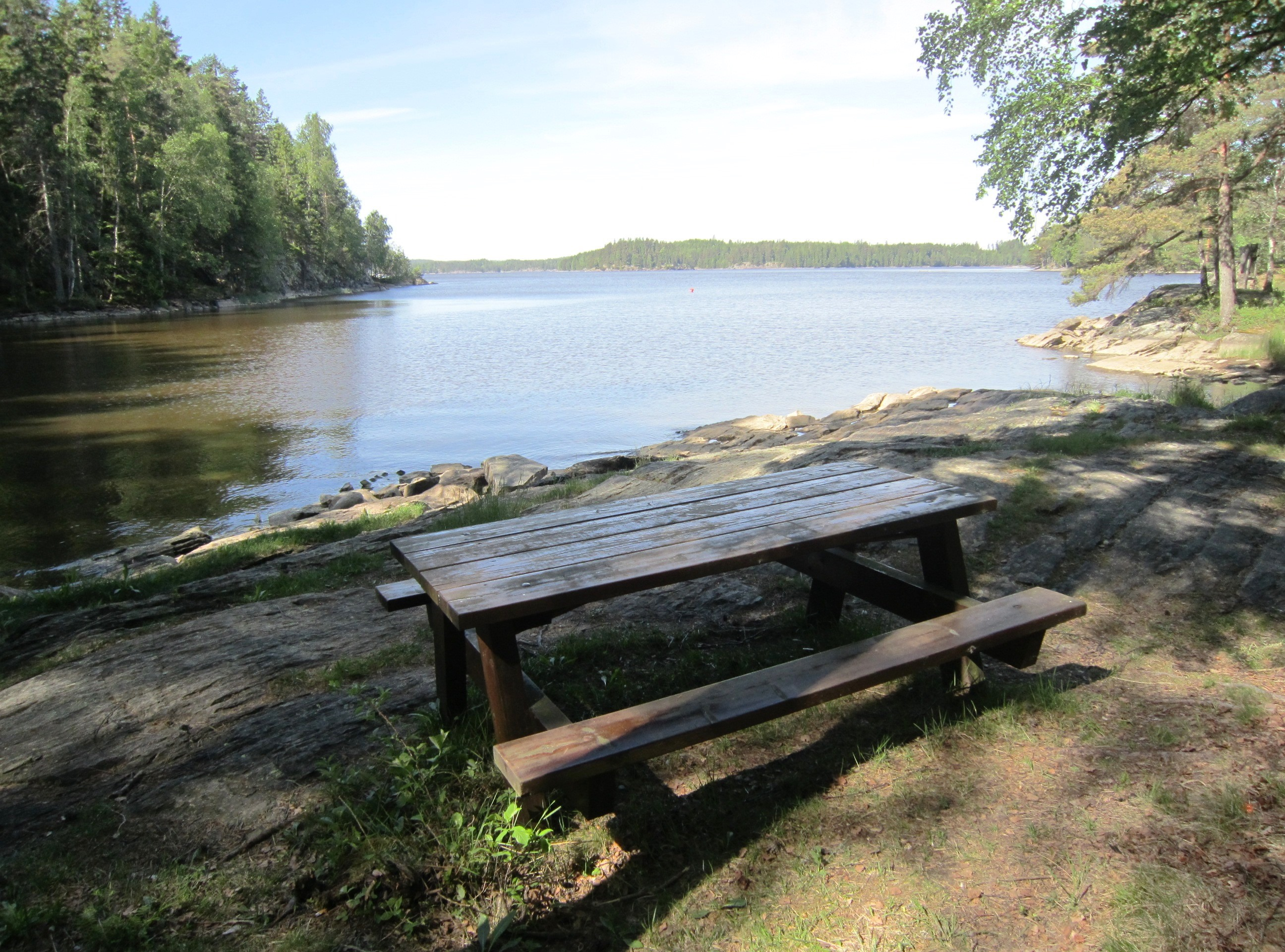

- Location within Østfold Location within Norway
- Location: Aremark (Østfold)
- Coordinates: 59°10′2″N 11°42′23″E
- Basin countries: Norway
- Surface area: 6.76 km^{2} (2.61 sq mi)
- Shore length^{1}: 30.54 km (18.98 mi)
- Surface elevation: 105 m (344 ft)
- References: NVE
- ^{1} Shore length is not a well-defined measure.

Aspern is a lake in the municipality of Aremark in Østfold county, Norway.

== See also ==
- List of lakes in Norway
