= Hallangen =

- Location within Akershus
- Location: Aurskog-Høland, Akershus
- Coordinates: 59.7758°N 11.7258°E
- Type: natural freshwater lake
- Basin countries: Norway
- Max. length: 3.46 kilometres (2.15 mi)
- Max. width: 0.77 kilometres (0.48 mi)
- Surface elevation: 191 m (627 ft)
- Islands: 1

Hallangen is a lake on rv 21 in Setskog, Aurskog-Høland, a municipality of Akershus, south-eastern Norway. Hallangen lies at a height of 191 m above sea level. The lake is a remnant of the timber floating between Langebruslora and down to Gåsefjorden. From 2004, many new cabins have been built around Hallangen and eastwards. It is a fishing destination. Flyktningeruta was a land flight route during World War II passing through Hallangen. Flyktningeruta was marked in 1995.
