= Fundin (lake) =

Lake in Oppdal and Folldal, Norway

- Interactive map of the lake
- Location: Trøndelag and Innlandet
- Coordinates: 62.3575°N 09.9116°E
- Basin countries: Norway
- Max. length: 12 kilometres (7.5 mi)
- Max. width: 1 kilometre (0.62 mi)
- Surface area: 9.72 km^{2} (3.75 sq mi)
- Shore length^{1}: 43 kilometres (27 mi)
- Surface elevation: 1,021 metres (3,350 ft)
- References: NVE
- ^{1} Shore length is not a well-defined measure.

Fundin is a lake in Folldal Municipality in Innlandet county and Oppdal Municipality in Trøndelag county, Norway. The 9.72-square-kilometre (3.75 sq mi) lake has a dam at the south end of it, holding back the water for hydroelectric power production, before letting it flow into the Einunna river.

The lake lies in the Dovrefjell mountains, about 14 kilometres (8.7 mi) east of the Drivdalen valley, about 25 kilometres (16 mi) southeast of the village of Oppdal.

== See also ==
- List of lakes in Norway
