= Samsjøen (Ringerike) =

Lake in Ringerike, Norway

- Location within Norway
- Location: Ringerike in Buskerud and Jevnaker in (Akershus)
- Coordinates: 60°21′42″N 10°11′32″E
- Basin countries: Norway
- Surface area: 3.18 km^{2} (1.23 sq mi)
- Shore length^{1}: 11.91 km (7.40 mi)
- Surface elevation: 214 m (702 ft)
- References: NVE
- ^{1} Shore length is not a well-defined measure.

Samsjøen is a lake in the municipalities of Ringerike in Buskerud county and Jevnaker in Akershus county.

Samsjøen receives inflow from the Haugerud river (Haugerudelva) which enters the lake from the northwest. Somma is the largest of the tributaries formed at the end of Samsjøen. Somma starts from the south end of Samsjøen and flows southwest as it travels through the valley of Somdalen. The watershed drains to the valley of Ådal and is part of Begna watershed.

== See also ==
- List of lakes in Norway
