= Rødenessjøen =

Lake in Norway

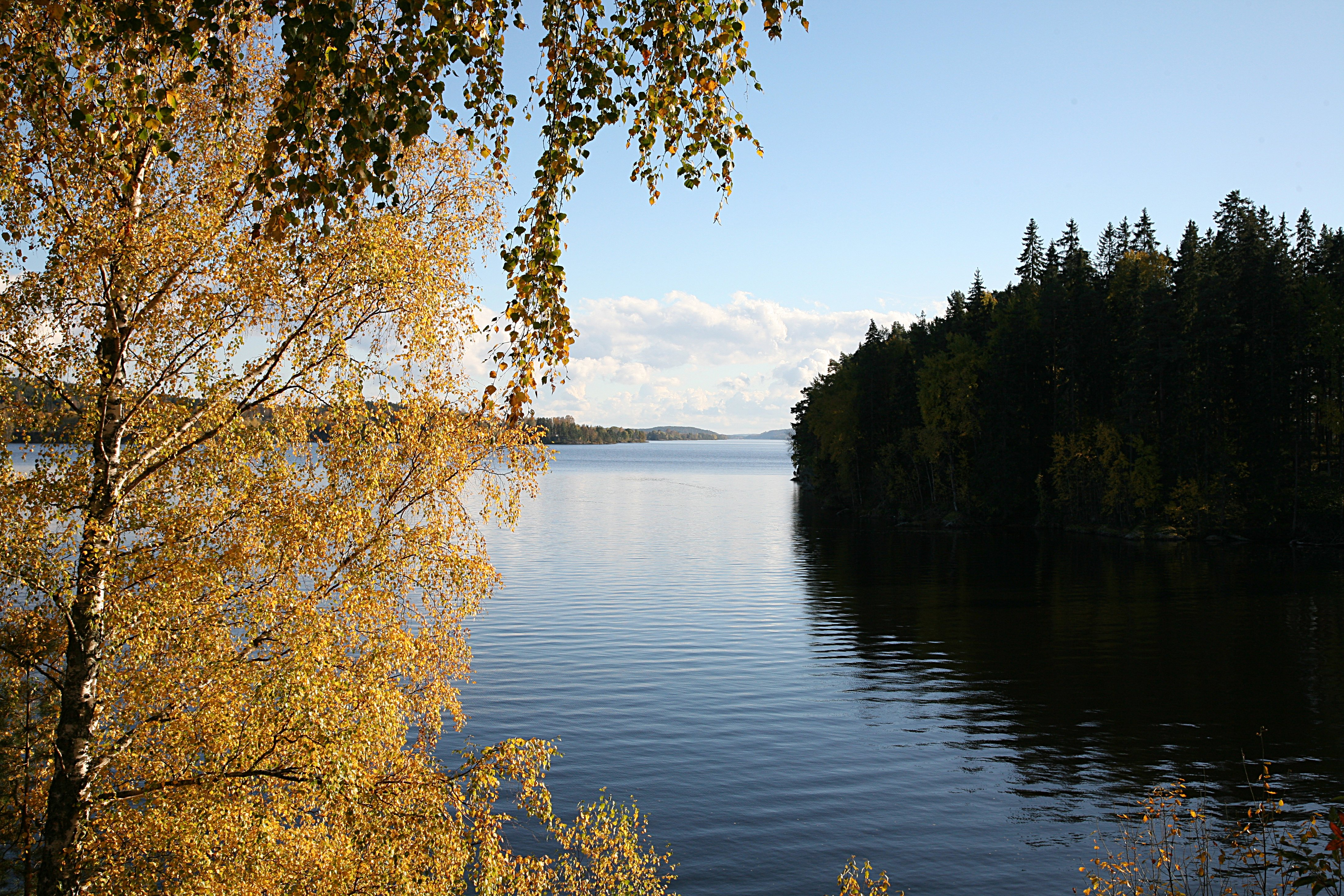

- Location within Akershus
- Location: Aurskog-Høland (Akershus); Marker (Østfold)
- Coordinates: 59°29′16″N 11°38′45″E
- Basin countries: Norway
- Surface area: 15.92 km^{2} (6.15 sq mi)
- Max. depth: 50.2 m (165 ft)
- Shore length^{1}: 58.80 km (36.54 mi)
- Surface elevation: 118 m (387 ft)
- References: NVE
- ^{1} Shore length is not a well-defined measure.

Rødenessjøen is a lake in the municipalities of Aurskog-Høland in Akershus county and Marker in Østfold county, Norway.

== See also ==
- List of lakes in Norway
