= Namsskogan =

Namsskogan may refer to:

== Places ==
- Namsskogan Municipality, a municipality in Trøndelag county, Norway
- Namsskogan (village), a village within Namsskogan Municipality in Trøndelag county, Norway
- Namsskogan Familiepark, a zoo and amusement park in Namsskogan Municipality in Trøndelag county, Norway
- Namsskogan Station, a railway station along the Nordlandsbanen railway line in Trøndelag county, Norway
- Namsskogan IL, a former sports club based in Namsskogan Municipality in Trøndelag county, Norway
