= Park Nordica =

Zoo and amusement park in Namsskogan, Norway

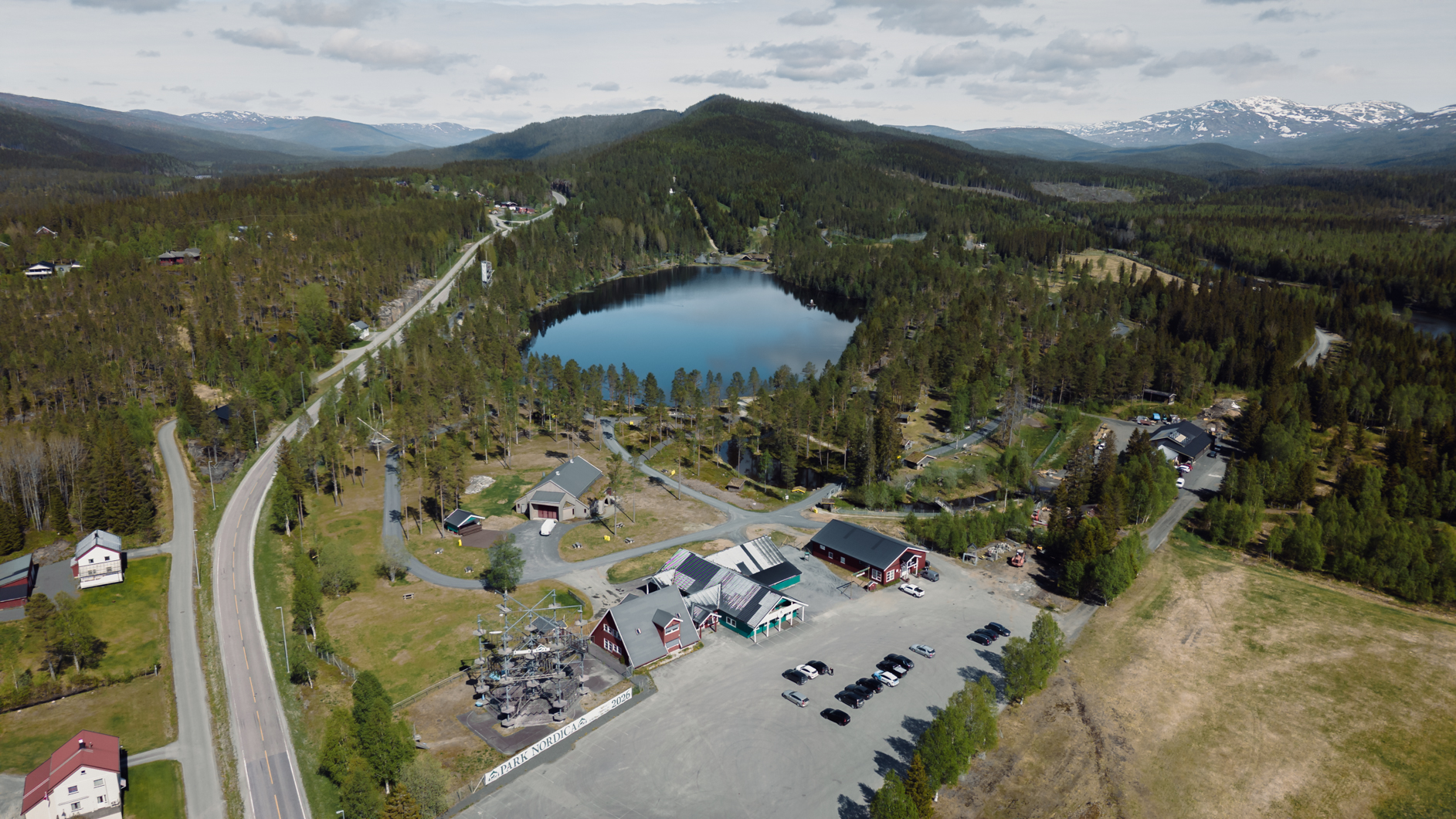
- Interactive map of Park Nordica
- 64.7431°N 12.8475°E
- Date opened: 1989
- Date closed: 2025
- Location: Namsskogan Municipality, Norway
- Website: was:www.familieparken.no new:park-nordica.com

Park Nordica, until 2025 Namsskogan Familienpark, is a zoo and amusement park in Namsskogan Municipality in Norway. The park is situated around the Tronestjønna, by the town Trones along E6. The park was opened in 1989 and had more than 52,000 visitors in 2011. It was open every day in summer, and by appointment during winter. Park Nordica has more than 30 species of animals, including bears, Arctic fox and several types of livestock. The park also contained several amusement park rides.

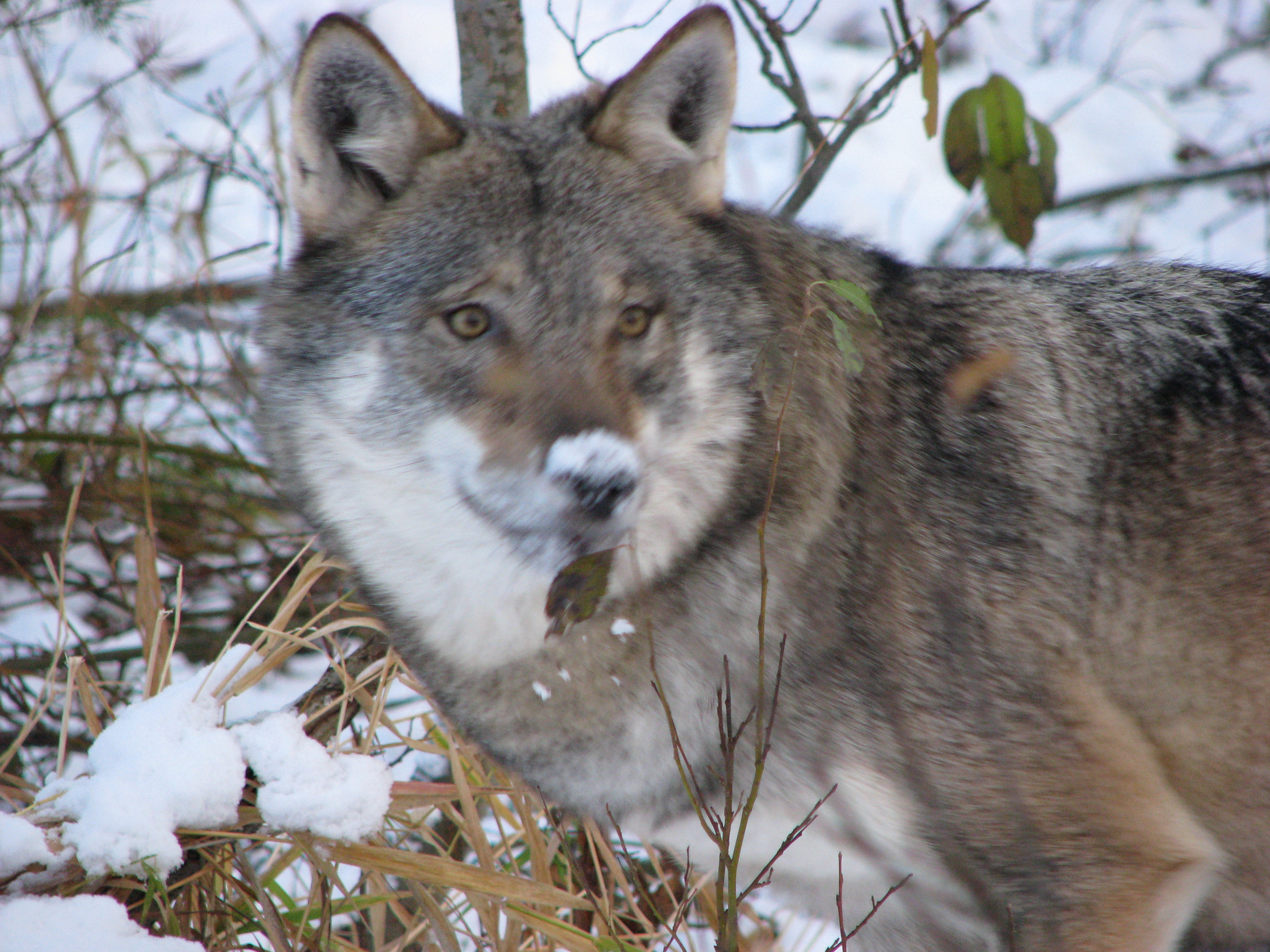
Wolf in Namskogan Familiepark

Namsskogan Familiepark went bankrupt in February 2025. The park was sold to a new owner and reopened in spring 2026 under the new name Park Nordica.
