= Åbjøra =

Åbjøra Åelva
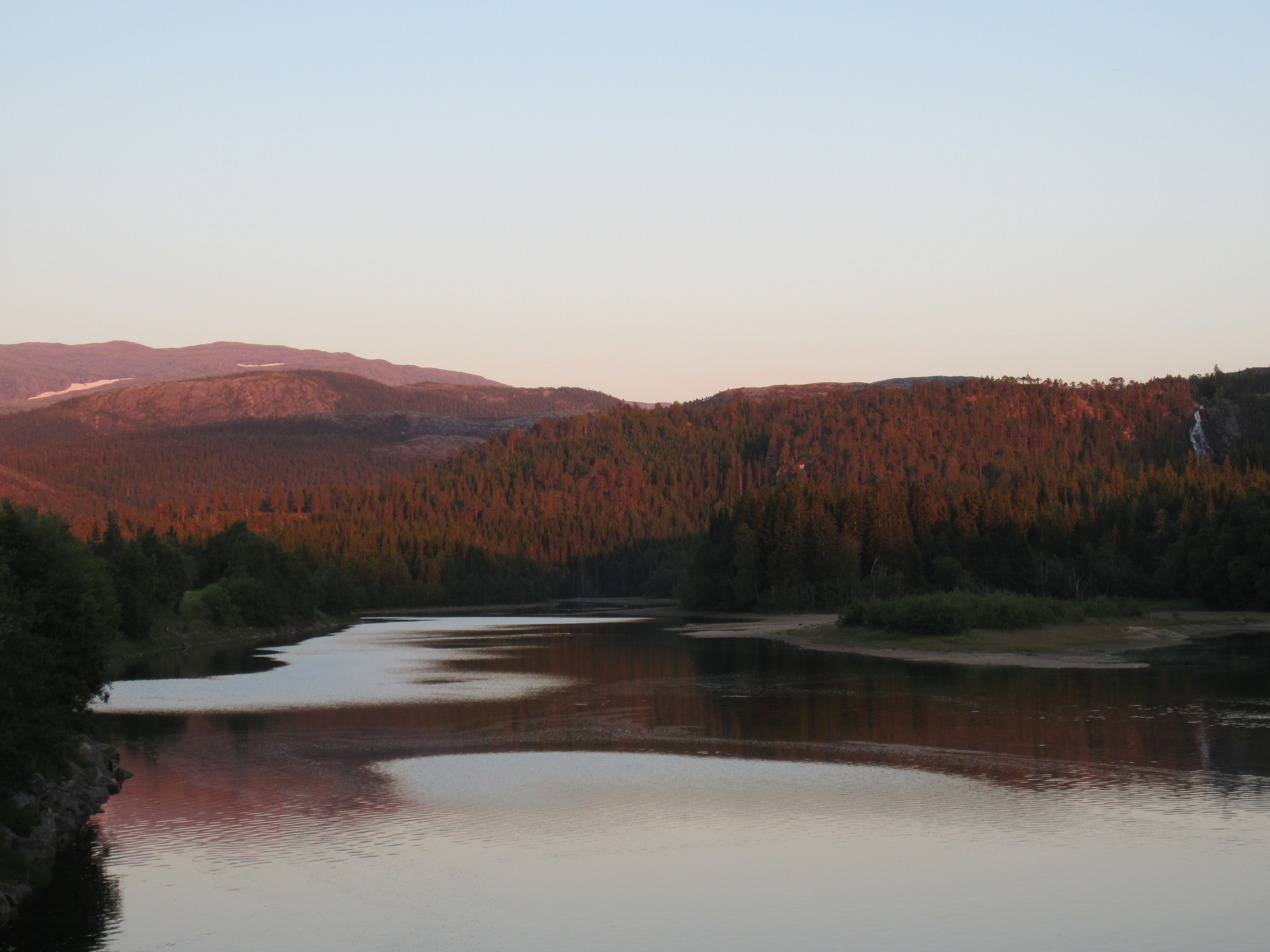
- Interactive map of the river

Location
- Country: Norway
- County: Nordland
- Municipalities: Bindal Municipality

Physical characteristics
- Source: Kalvkruvatnet
  - location: Bindal, Norway
  - coordinates: 65.07850°N 12.89610°E
  - elevation: 268 metres (879 ft)
- Mouth: Osan fjord
  - location: Bindal, Norway
  - coordinates: 65.0246°N 12.7681°E
  - elevation: 0 metres (0 ft)
- Length: 59 km (37 mi)
- Basin size: 520 km^{2} (200 sq mi)

Åbjøra is a river in Bindal Municipality in Nordland county, Norway. It begins in the mountains between the Tosen fjord and the Namdalen valley. The 59-kilometre (37 mi) long river passes through some lakes, including the lake Åbjørvatnet, then past the village of Åbygda, and ends in the Osan fjord, not far from the village of Terråk. It is a small river but good for fishing for salmon or sea trout.
