= Frøyningen =

Lake in Namsskogan, Norway

Frøyningen (Norwegian) Freavnanjaevrie (Southern Sami)
- Storfrøyningen (Norwegian); Stoerre Freavnanjaevrie (Southern Sami)
- Interactive map of the lake
- Location: Namsskogan Municipality, Trøndelag
- Coordinates: 64.9908°N 13.1759°E
- Basin countries: Norway
- Max. length: 4 kilometres (2.5 mi)
- Max. width: 2 kilometres (1.2 mi)
- Surface area: 2.72 km^{2} (1.05 sq mi)
- Shore length^{1}: 19.3 kilometres (12.0 mi)
- Surface elevation: 252 metres (827 ft)
- References: NVE
- ^{1} Shore length is not a well-defined measure.

Frøyningen (Norwegian) or Freavnanjaevrie (Southern Sami) is a lake in Namsskogan Municipality in Trøndelag county, Norway. The 2.72-square-kilometre (1.05 sq mi) lake lies about 700 metres (2,300 ft) west of the European route E6 highway and the river Namsen, about 5 kilometres (3.1 mi) north of the village of Namsskogan.

== See also ==
- List of lakes in Norway
