= Vassås Bridge =

Vassås Bridge Vassås bru
- Coordinates: 65°05′32″N 12°24′18″E
- Carries: Fv1
- Locale: Bindal Municipality, Norway

Characteristics
- Design: Cantilever bridge
- Total length: 400 metres (1,300 ft)
- Longest span: 160 metres (520 ft)

History
- Opened: 1980

The Vassås Bridge (Norwegian: Vassås bru) is a cantilever bridge that crosses the Osan fjord in Bindal Municipality in Nordland county, Norway. The bridge is part of Norwegian County Road 1 and it connects the villages of Vassås and Terråk. The Vassås Bridge was opened in 1980 and is 400 metres (1,300 ft) long with a main span of 160 metres (520 ft).

== See also ==
- List of bridges in Norway
- List of bridges in Norway by length
- List of bridges
- List of bridges by length
