= Åbjørvatnet =

Lake in Bindal, Norway

Åbjørvatnet (Norwegian)
- Diedtjienjaevrie (Southern Sami)
- Location within Nordland
- Interactive map of the lake
- Location: Bindal Municipality, Nordland
- Coordinates: 65.0208°N 12.6782°E
- Type: Lake
- Primary inflows: Åbjøra River
- Primary outflows: Åbjøra River
- Basin countries: Norway
- Max. length: 4.7 km (2.9 mi)
- Max. width: 1.5 km (0.93 mi)
- Surface area: 4.54 km^{2} (1.75 sq mi)
- Shore length^{1}: 18.92 km (11.76 mi)
- Surface elevation: 81 m (266 ft)
- References: NVE
- ^{1} Shore length is not a well-defined measure.

Åbjørvatnet (Norwegian) or Diedtjienjaevrie (Southern Sami) is a lake that lies in the southeastern part of Bindal Municipality in Nordland county, Norway. The lake is part of the river Åbjøra, about 8 km (5.0 mi) east of the village of Åbygda.

== See also ==
- List of lakes in Norway
- Geography of Norway
