= Trones, Namsskogan =

Village in Namsskogan Municipality, Norway

Trones
- Village
- Interactive map of Trones
- Location within Trøndelag Location within Norway
- Coordinates: 64.7422°N 12.8450°E
- Country: Norway
- Region: Central Norway
- County: Trøndelag
- District: Namdalen
- Municipality: Namsskogan Municipality
- Elevation: 140 m (460 ft)
- Time zone: UTC+01:00 (CET)
  - Summer (DST): UTC+02:00 (CEST)
- Post Code: 7892 Trones

Trones is a village in Namsskogan Municipality in Trøndelag county, Norway. It is located along the river Namsen about 30 kilometres (19 mi) south of the village of Namsskogan and about 15 kilometres (9.3 mi) south of the village of Brekkvasselv. The village of Skorovatn is located about 30 kilometres (19 mi) to the southeast. Trones Church is located in Trones, and it is the main church for the area. European route E6 highway and the Nordlandsbanen railway line both pass through the village.
