= Kohlrosing =

Scandinavian tradition

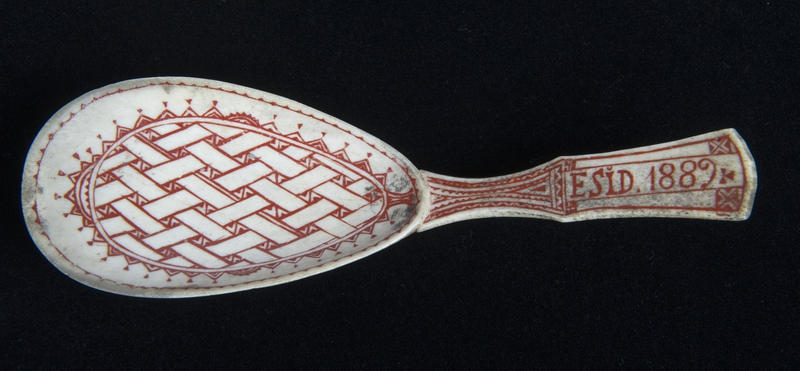
Sami spoon with red kohlrosing, dated 1889 from Namsskogan Municipality in Trøndelag. Photo Anne-Lise Reinsfelt, Norsk Folkemuseum, NFSA.0294J.

Kohlrosing (a.k.a. Kolrosing) is the Scandinavian tradition of incising thin decorative lines and patterns in carved wood and filling with dark powders (charcoal, coal dust, coffee grounds, graphite, ground bark) or colored wax, etc. for contrast. Kohlrosing dates back to at least Viking times.

Notable contemporary exponents include Judy Ritger (USA), Wille Sundqvist (Sweden) and Jogge Sundqvist (Sweden).
