= Storgåsvatnet =

Lake in Namsskogan, Norway

Storgåsvatnet (Norwegian) Stoerrereetjke (Southern Sami)
- Vestre Gåsvatnet (Norwegian)
- Interactive map of the lake
- Location: Namsskogan Municipality, Trøndelag
- Coordinates: 65.0642°N 13.1711°E
- Basin countries: Norway
- Max. length: 4 kilometres (2.5 mi)
- Max. width: 1.5 kilometres (0.93 mi)
- Surface area: 2.8 km^{2} (1.1 sq mi)
- Shore length^{1}: 12.43 kilometres (7.72 mi)
- Surface elevation: 493 metres (1,617 ft)
- References: NVE
- ^{1} Shore length is not a well-defined measure.

Storgåsvatnet (Norwegian) or Stoerrereetjke (Southern Sami) is a lake in Namsskogan Municipality in Trøndelag county, Norway. The 2.8-square-kilometre (1.1 sq mi) lake lies in the northern part of the municipality, southwest of the lake Mellingsvatnet and 4 kilometres (2.5 mi) west of the European route E6 highway. It is near Børgefjell National Park.

== See also ==
- List of lakes in Norway
