= Kalvvatnet =

Lake in Namsskogan, Norway

Kalvvatnet (Norwegian) Gaejsienjaevrie (Southern Sami)
- Interactive map of the lake
- Location: Namsskogan Municipality (Trøndelag) and Bindal Municipality (Nordland)
- Coordinates: 65.0597°N 12.9654°E
- Basin countries: Norway
- Max. length: 3 kilometres (1.9 mi)
- Max. width: 2 kilometres (1.2 mi)
- Surface area: 2.65 km^{2} (1.02 sq mi)
- Shore length^{1}: 16 kilometres (9.9 mi)
- Surface elevation: 741 metres (2,431 ft)
- References: NVE
- ^{1} Shore length is not a well-defined measure.

Kalvvatnet (Norwegian) or Gaelpienjaevrie (Southern Sami) is a lake in Norway that lies in Namsskogan Municipality in Trøndelag county and Bindal Municipality in Nordland county. Most of the 2.65-square-kilometre (1.02 sq mi) lake is in Bindal Municipality, about 15 kilometres (9.3 mi) northwest of the village of Namsskogan.

== See also ==
- List of lakes in Norway
- Geography of Norway
