= Bindal Municipality =

Municipality in Nordland, Norway

Bindal Municipality Bindal kommune Bindaelie
- Municipality
- Bindalen herred (historic name)
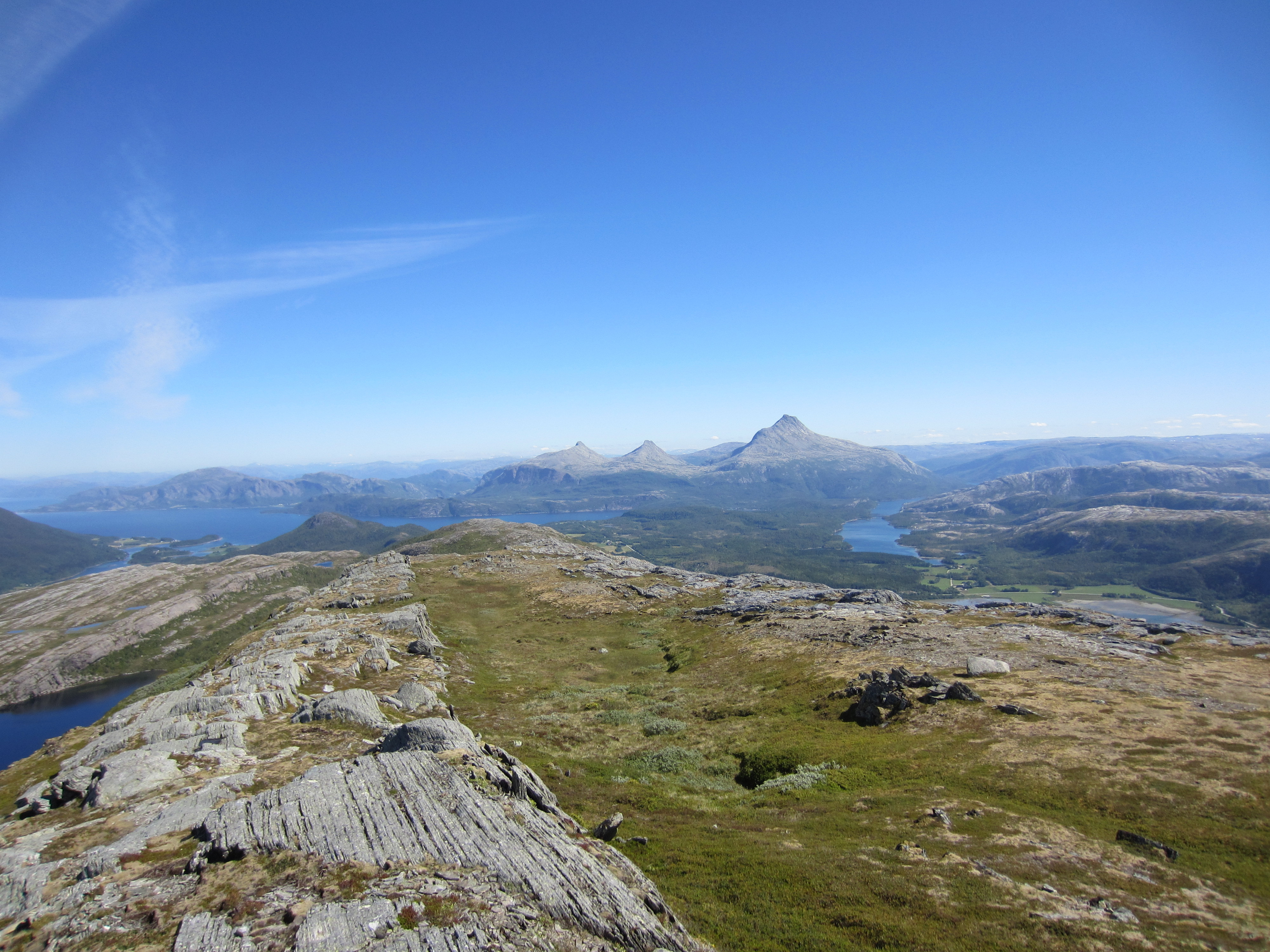
- Photo showing some of the landmarks in Bindal, including the second highest mountain Heilhornet (center-right part of the image)

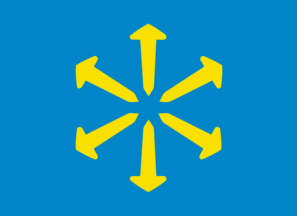
- Flag Coat of arms

- Nordland within Norway

- Bindal within Nordland
- Coordinates: 65°05′48″N 12°35′19″E
- Country: Norway
- County: Nordland
- District: Helgeland
- Established: 1 Jan 1838
  - Created as: Formannskapsdistrikt
- Administrative centre: Terråk

Government
  - Mayor (2024): Frode Næsvold (Ap)

Area
  - Total: 1,266.07 km^{2} (488.83 sq mi)
  - Land: 1,192.23 km^{2} (460.32 sq mi)
  - Water: 73.84 km^{2} (28.51 sq mi) 5.8%
  - Rank: #81 in Norway
- Highest elevation: 1,088.13 m (3,570.0 ft)

Population (2024)
  - Total: 1,399
  - Rank: #306 in Norway
  - Density: 1.1/km^{2} (2.8/sq mi)
  - Change (10 years): ▼ −6.9%
- Demonym: Bindaling

Official language
  - Norwegian form: Bokmål
- Time zone: UTC+01:00 (CET)
  - Summer (DST): UTC+02:00 (CEST)
- ISO 3166 code: NO-1811
- Website: Official website

Bindal is a municipality in the Helgeland region in the extreme southwest part of Nordland county, Norway. The administrative centre is the village of Terråk. Other villages include Bindalseidet, Holm, Vassås, Horsfjord and Åbygda.

The 1,266-square-kilometre (489 sq mi) municipality is the 81st largest by area out of the 357 municipalities in Norway. Bindal Municipality is the 306th most populous municipality in Norway with a population of 1,399. The municipality's population density is 1.2 inhabitants per square kilometre (3.1/sq mi) and its population has decreased by 10% over the previous 10-year period.

== History ==
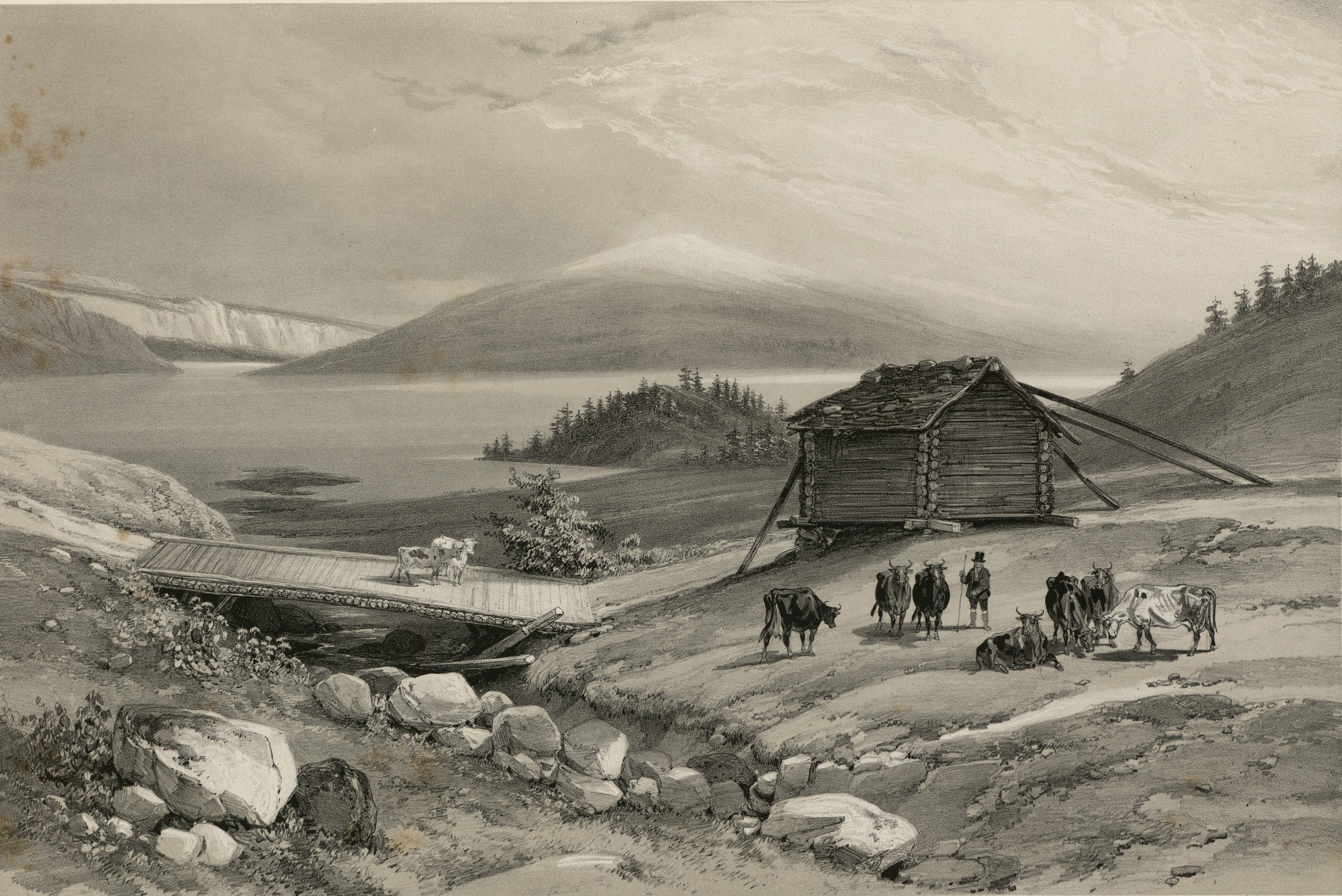
Hildringen in Bindal (1852).

The ancient district of Bindalen belonged to Namdalen. However, in 1658, when the county (län) of Trondheim was ceded to Sweden in the Treaty of Roskilde, the status of the border district was ambiguous, with residents paying some taxes to Helgeland, in Nordland, and some to Namdalen. The decision was then made to redraw the county boundary to run down the Bindalsfjorden and assigning the northern part, Nord-Bindalen, to Nordland county (which remained in the Kingdom of Denmark-Norway) and the larger part remained in Trondheim county and became Sør-Bindalen (and part of the Kingdom of Sweden). The two remained separate after Trøndelag county was reunited with Norway in 1660.

In 1815, a single Church of Norway prestegjeld called Bindalen was created, combining Nord-Bindalen and Sør-Bindalen into one church parish, despite belonging to different counties.

The 1838 formannskapsdistrikt law divided the country into civil municipalities which were supposed to correspond to the parishes of the Church of Norway. The parish of Bindalen (which straddled the county border) was created as Bindal Municipality, but the southern part was part of Nordre Trondheim county and the northern part of the municipality belonged to Nordland county, making for an unusual situation. In 1852, the county border was moved so that all of Bindal Municipality was located in Nordland county.

On 1 January 1964, the area around the inner Bindalsfjorden and the village of Lande (population: 296) was transferred from Bindal Municipality to Brønnøy Municipality.

=== Name ===
The municipality (originally the parish) is named after the Bindalen valley (Old Norse: Birnudalr). The first element is the genitive case of the river name Birna (now called the river Åbjøra). The river name is derived from the word birna which means "(female) bear". The last element is dalr which means "valley" or "dale". Historically, the name of the municipality was spelled Bindalen. On 3 November 1917, a royal resolution changed the spelling of the name of the municipality to Bindal, removing the definite form ending -en.

=== Coat of arms ===
The coat of arms was granted on 9 February 1990. The official blazon is "Azure, six nails Or in annulo" (Norwegian: I blått seks gull nagler i rosett). This means the arms have a blue field (background) and the charge is a circular arrangement of six nails or rivets. The charge has a tincture of Or which means it is commonly colored yellow, but if it is made out of metal, then gold is used. The blue color in the field symbolizes the importance of the sea and boating and the circular arrangement of rivets was chosen to symbolize the importance of the boat building industry in Bindal. There are six rivets to represent 6 school districts, 6 originally inhabited islands, and 6 fjords areas in the municipality. The arms were designed by Arvid Sveen.

== Churches ==
The Church of Norway has two parishes (sokn) within Bindal Municipality. It is part of the Sør-Helgeland prosti (deanery) in the Diocese of Sør-Hålogaland.

Churches in Bindal Municipality
Parish (sokn)	Church name	Location of the church	Year built
Solstad	Solstad Church	Holm	1888
Vassås	Vassås Church	Vassås	1733

== Geography ==
Bindal Municipality borders four municipalities in Trøndelag county: Høylandet Municipality and Nærøysund Municipality in the south, Namsskogan Municipality in the southeast, and Leka Municipality in the west. Bindal also has borders Sømna Municipality, Brønnøy Municipality, and Grane Municipality in Nordland county. The Bindalsfjorden runs through the central part of the municipality.

From the coast, the municipality reaches into the mountains towards the lake Majavatnet in Grane. The highest point in the municipality is the 1,088.13-metre (3,570.0 ft) tall mountain Tjeldviktinden on the border with Brønnøy Municipality. Another notable mountain is the 1,058-metre (3,471 ft) tall Heilhornet. It also includes part of the lakes Eidvatnet and Fjellvatnet, which also partially lie in Brønnøy Municipality. Other lakes include Åbjørvatnet, Kalvvatnet, and Saglivatnet. The river Åbjøra runs through the eastern part of Bindal. Part of the island of Austra is in Bindal.

== Government ==
Bindal Municipality is responsible for primary education (through 10th grade), outpatient health services, senior citizen services, welfare and other social services, zoning, economic development, and municipal roads and utilities. The municipality is governed by a municipal council of directly elected representatives. The mayor is indirectly elected by a vote of the municipal council. The municipality is under the jurisdiction of the Helgeland District Court and the Hålogaland Court of Appeal.

Municipal waste management has since 1994 been handled by the inter-municipal Midtre Namdal Avfallsselskap, with ReTrans Midt handling waste collection since 2018.

=== Municipal council ===
The municipal council (Kommunestyre) of Bindal Municipality is made up of 17 representatives that are elected to four year terms. The tables below show the current and historical composition of the council by political party.

Bindal kommunestyre 2023–2027
Party name (in Norwegian)	Number of representatives
Labour Party (Arbeiderpartiet)	13
Socialist Left Party (Sosialistisk Venstreparti)	4
Total number of members:	17

Bindal kommunestyre 2019–2023
Party name (in Norwegian)	Number of representatives
Labour Party (Arbeiderpartiet)	9
Centre Party (Senterpartiet)	3
Bindal List (Bindalslista)	5
Total number of members:	17

Bindal kommunestyre 2015–2019
Party name (in Norwegian)	Number of representatives
Labour Party (Arbeiderpartiet)	9
Centre Party (Senterpartiet)	2
Socialist Left Party (Sosialistisk Venstreparti)	1
Joint list of the Conservative Party (Høyre) and the Liberal Party (Venstre)	5
Total number of members:	17

Bindal kommunestyre 2011–2015
Party name (in Norwegian)	Number of representatives
Labour Party (Arbeiderpartiet)	6
Joint list of the Conservative Party (Høyre) and the Liberal Party (Venstre)	8
Joint list of the Centre Party (Senterpartiet) and the Socialist Left Party (Sosialistisk Venstreparti)	2
Bindal Alternative List (Bindal Alternative Liste)	1
Total number of members:	17

Bindal kommunestyre 2007–2011
Party name (in Norwegian)	Number of representatives
Labour Party (Arbeiderpartiet)	8
Joint list of the Conservative Party (Høyre) and the Liberal Party (Venstre)	4
Joint list of the Centre Party (Senterpartiet) and the Socialist Left Party (Sosialistisk Venstreparti)	3
Bindal alternative list (Bindal alternative liste)	2
Total number of members:	17

Bindal kommunestyre 2003–2007
Party name (in Norwegian)	Number of representatives
Labour Party (Arbeiderpartiet)	8
Socialist Left Party (Sosialistisk Venstreparti)	2
Joint list of the Conservative Party (Høyre), Centre Party (Senterpartiet), and Liberal Party (Venstre)	5
Bindal Alternative List (Bindal Alternative Liste)	2
Total number of members:	17

Bindal kommunestyre 1999–2003
Party name (in Norwegian)	Number of representatives
Labour Party (Arbeiderpartiet)	9
Conservative Party (Høyre)	1
Centre Party (Senterpartiet)	2
Socialist Left Party (Sosialistisk Venstreparti)	2
Liberal Party (Venstre)	3
Total number of members:	17

Bindal kommunestyre 1995–1999
Party name (in Norwegian)	Number of representatives
Labour Party (Arbeiderpartiet)	8
Socialist Left Party (Sosialistisk Venstreparti)	1
Joint list of the Liberal Party (Venstre) and Christian Democratic Party (Kristelig Folkeparti)	7
Common list for Bindal (Samlingsliste for Bindal)	1
Total number of members:	17

Bindal kommunestyre 1991–1995
Party name (in Norwegian)	Number of representatives
Labour Party (Arbeiderpartiet)	8
Conservative Party (Høyre)	1
Centre Party (Senterpartiet)	4
Socialist Left Party (Sosialistisk Venstreparti)	2
Joint list of the Liberal Party (Venstre) and Christian Democratic Party (Kristelig Folkeparti)	1
Common list for Bindal (Samlingslistefor Bindal)	1
Total number of members:	17

Bindal kommunestyre 1987–1991
Party name (in Norwegian)	Number of representatives
Labour Party (Arbeiderpartiet)	7
Conservative Party (Høyre)	1
Centre Party (Senterpartiet)	4
Socialist Left Party (Sosialistisk Venstreparti)	2
Joint list of the Liberal Party (Venstre) and Christian Democratic Party (Kristelig Folkeparti)	2
Common list for Bindal (Samlingsliste for Bindal)	1
Total number of members:	17

Bindal kommunestyre 1983–1987
Party name (in Norwegian)	Number of representatives
Labour Party (Arbeiderpartiet)	8
Conservative Party (Høyre)	1
Christian Democratic Party (Kristelig Folkeparti)	1
Centre Party (Senterpartiet)	4
Socialist Left Party (Sosialistisk Venstreparti)	3
Total number of members:	17

Bindal kommunestyre 1979–1983
Party name (in Norwegian)	Number of representatives
Labour Party (Arbeiderpartiet)	4
Conservative Party (Høyre)	1
Christian Democratic Party (Kristelig Folkeparti)	1
Centre Party (Senterpartiet)	4
Socialist Left Party (Sosialistisk Venstreparti)	2
Cooperative list for Inner Bindal (Samarbeidsliste for Indre Bindal)	5
Total number of members:	17

Bindal kommunestyre 1975–1979
Party name (in Norwegian)	Number of representatives
Labour Party (Arbeiderpartiet)	6
Socialist Left Party (Sosialistisk Venstreparti)	2
Local List(s) (Lokale lister)	9
Total number of members:	17

Bindal kommunestyre 1971–1975
Party name (in Norwegian)	Number of representatives
Labour Party (Arbeiderpartiet)	2
Centre Party (Senterpartiet)	7
Local List(s) (Lokale lister)	8
Total number of members:	17

Bindal kommunestyre 1967–1971
Party name (in Norwegian)	Number of representatives
Local List(s) (Lokale lister)	17
Total number of members:	17

Bindal kommunestyre 1963–1967
Party name (in Norwegian)	Number of representatives
Local List(s) (Lokale lister)	17
Total number of members:	17

Bindal herredsstyre 1959–1963
Party name (in Norwegian)	Number of representatives
Local List(s) (Lokale lister)	17
Total number of members:	17

Bindal herredsstyre 1955–1959
Party name (in Norwegian)	Number of representatives
Labour Party (Arbeiderpartiet)	5
Communist Party (Kommunistiske Parti)	1
Local List(s) (Lokale lister)	11
Total number of members:	17

Bindal herredsstyre 1951–1955
Party name (in Norwegian)	Number of representatives
Labour Party (Arbeiderpartiet)	7
Farmers' Party (Bondepartiet)	1
Local List(s) (Lokale lister)	9
Total number of members:	17

Bindal herredsstyre 1947–1951
Party name (in Norwegian)	Number of representatives
Labour Party (Arbeiderpartiet)	7
List of workers, fishermen, and small farmholders (Arbeidere, fiskere, småbrukere liste)	1
Joint List(s) of Non-Socialist Parties (Borgerlige Felleslister)	4
Total number of members:	12

Bindal herredsstyre 1945–1947
Party name (in Norwegian)	Number of representatives
Labour Party (Arbeiderpartiet)	3
Joint List(s) of Non-Socialist Parties (Borgerlige Felleslister)	1
Local List(s) (Lokale lister)	8
Total number of members:	12

Bindal herredsstyre 1937–1941*
Party name (in Norwegian)	Number of representatives
Labour Party (Arbeiderpartiet)	2
Local List(s) (Lokale lister)	10
Total number of members:	12
Note: Due to the German occupation of Norway during World War II, no elections were held for new municipal councils until after the war ended in 1945.

=== Mayors ===
The mayor (Norwegian: ordfører) of Bindal Municipality is the political leader of the municipality and the chairperson of the municipal council. Here is a list of people who have held this position:

- 1838–1839: Gjest C. Halstensen
- 1840–1841: Jens Kristoffersen
- 1842–1843: Rev. Jens J. Hansen
- 1844–1860: I. Arntsen
- 1861–1862: Ulrik Sverdrup
- 1863–1876: I. Arntsen
- 1877–1878: Rev. Karl Julius Arnesen
- 1879–1880: Christian Svendsen
- 1881–1884: Otto Steen Olsen Holm
- 1885–1887: Rev. Olaf Amundsen
- 1888–1891: Kristoffer Arntsen
- 1892–1894: Rev. Johannes L. Rognaas
- 1895–1901: Martin Hansen Sylten
- 1902–1910: Peder P. Dybvik
- 1911–1919: Johan Lilleheil
- 1920–1922: Johan Reppen
- 1923–1925: Ole E. Skaalvik
- 1926–1928: Hans Sylten
- 1929–1931: Johan Lilleheil
- 1932–1934: Tomas Breivik
- 1935–1945: Fredrik Sverdrup
- 1946–1951: Ole Røtting (Ap)
- 1952–1955: Oddwin Skaiaa (H)
- 1956–1957: Ole Røtting (Ap)
- 1958–1959: Oddwin Skaiaa (H)
- 1960–1963: Ole Røtting (Ap)
- 1964–1967: Kristen I. Sylten (Ap)
- 1968–1971: Bertram Bull-Njaa (LL)
- 1972–1975: Håkon Hald (Sp)
- 1976–1979: Amund Skotnes (LL)
- 1980–1983: Kristen I. Sylten (Ap)
- 1983–2007: Magne H. Paulsen (Ap)
- 2007–2010: Per-André Johansen (Ap)
- 2010–2015: Petter Bjørnli (H)
- 2015–2023: Britt Helstad (Ap)
- 2023–present: Frode Næsvold (Ap)

== Economy ==
The most important industries in Bindal are aquaculture, farming and forestry.

== Culture ==
Boat races for Nordland boats have been held annually since 1978 in the main village of Terråk during the last weekend of June. Bindal has a traditional boat-building industry and Nordland boats are still manufactured here.

== Education ==
Bindal has two schools; one of them is classified as independent and therefore not administered by the municipality.

- Terråk skole in Terråk is a 1st-10th grade school and the largest in Bindal with approximately 100 students attending it.
- Bindalseidet friskole is an independent school located in Bindalseidet. It is a 1st-10th grade school.

== Notable people ==
- Otto Sverdrup (1854 in Bindal – 1930), a sailor and Arctic explorer
- Fredrik Paasche (1886 in Bindal – 1943), an educator, author and literary historian
- Carl Ludvig Godske (1906 in Bindal – 1970), a mathematician and meteorologist
- Lisbeth Berg-Hansen (born 1963 in Bindal), a salmon farmer and politician
