= Vassås Church =

Church in Nordland, Norway

- Vassås kirke
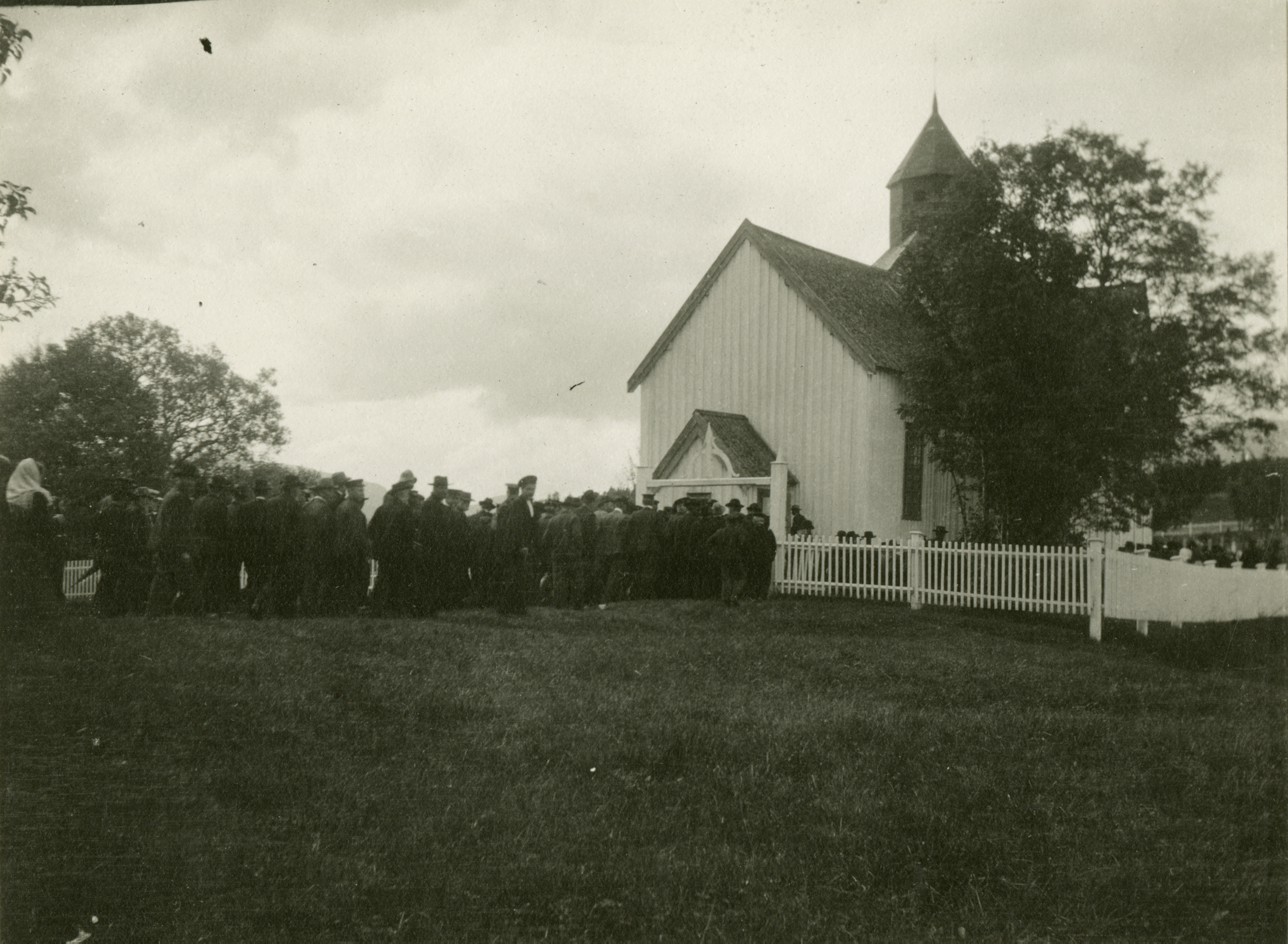
- View of the church
- Vassås Church
- 65.0978792°N 12.4216586°E
- Location: Bindal Municipality, Nordland
- Country: Norway
- Denomination: Church of Norway
- Churchmanship: Evangelical Lutheran

History
- Status: Parish church
- Founded: 13th century
- Consecrated: 1734

Architecture
- Functional status: Active
- Architect: Nils Ryjord
- Architectural type: Octagonal
- Completed: 1734 (292 years ago)

Specifications
- Capacity: 250
- Materials: Wood

Administration
- Diocese: Sør-Hålogaland
- Deanery: Sør-Helgeland prosti
- Parish: Bindal
- Norwegian Cultural Heritage Site
- Type: Church
- Status: Automatically protected
- ID: 85780

Vassås Church (Norwegian: Vassås kirke) is a parish church of the Church of Norway in Bindal Municipality in Nordland county, Norway. It is located in the village of Vassås. It is one of the two churches for the Bindal parish which is part of the Sør-Helgeland prosti (deanery) in the Diocese of Sør-Hålogaland. The white, wooden church was built in an octagonal style in 1734 using plans drawn up by the architect Nils Ryjord. The church seats about 250 people.

== History ==
The earliest existing historical records of the church date back to the year 1432, but the church was likely built around the year 1250. Not much is known about the medieval stave church, but it likely had a small nave and choir. In 1615, a new nave was built and the old nave was incorporated into the choir. Then in 1655, the nave was extended by adding a 6 by 10 metres (20 ft × 33 ft) wooden addition. In 1733, the old church was torn down. A new church was constructed on the same site and completed in 1734. This new building had an octagonal design.

== See also ==
- List of churches in Sør-Hålogaland
