= Sør-Bindalen =

- Parish
- Location within Nordland
- Coordinates: 65°07′34″N 12°14′04″E
- Country: Norway
- Region: Trøndelag
- County: Nord-Trøndelag
- District: Namdalen
- Time zone: UTC+01:00 (CET)
  - Summer (DST): UTC+02:00 (CEST)

Sør-Bindalen or Sørbindalen is a former administrative entity in the Namdalen district of Nord-Trøndelag county, Norway. It was in existence from 1658 to 1852. It is located in the present-day Bindal Municipality in Nordland county.

== History ==
The ancient district of Bindalen belonged to Namdalen. However, in 1658, when the county (län) of Trondheim was ceded to Sweden in the Treaty of Roskilde, the status of the border district was ambiguous, with residents paying some taxes to Helgeland, in Nordland, and some to Namdalen. The decision was then made to redraw the county boundary to run down the fjord, assigning the northern part, Nord-Bindalen, to Nordland county, which remained in the Kingdom of Denmark-Norway, while the larger part remained in Trondheim county and became Sør-Bindalen and part of the Kingdom of Sweden. The two remained separate after Trøndelag county was reunited with Norway in 1660.

In 1815, a single parish of Bindalen was created from the larger parish of Brønnø, despite the secular division of the community. The 1838 formannskapsdistrikt law divided the country into civil municipalities which were supposed to correspond to the parishes of the Church of Norway. The parish of Bindalen (which straddled the county border) was created as Bindal Municipality, but the southern part was part of Nordre Trondheim county and the northern part of the municipality belonged to Nordland county, making for an unusual situation. In 1852, the county border was moved so that all of Bindal Municipality was located in Nordland county.
