= Bjørhusdal Church =

Church in Trøndelag, Norway

- Bjørhusdal kirke
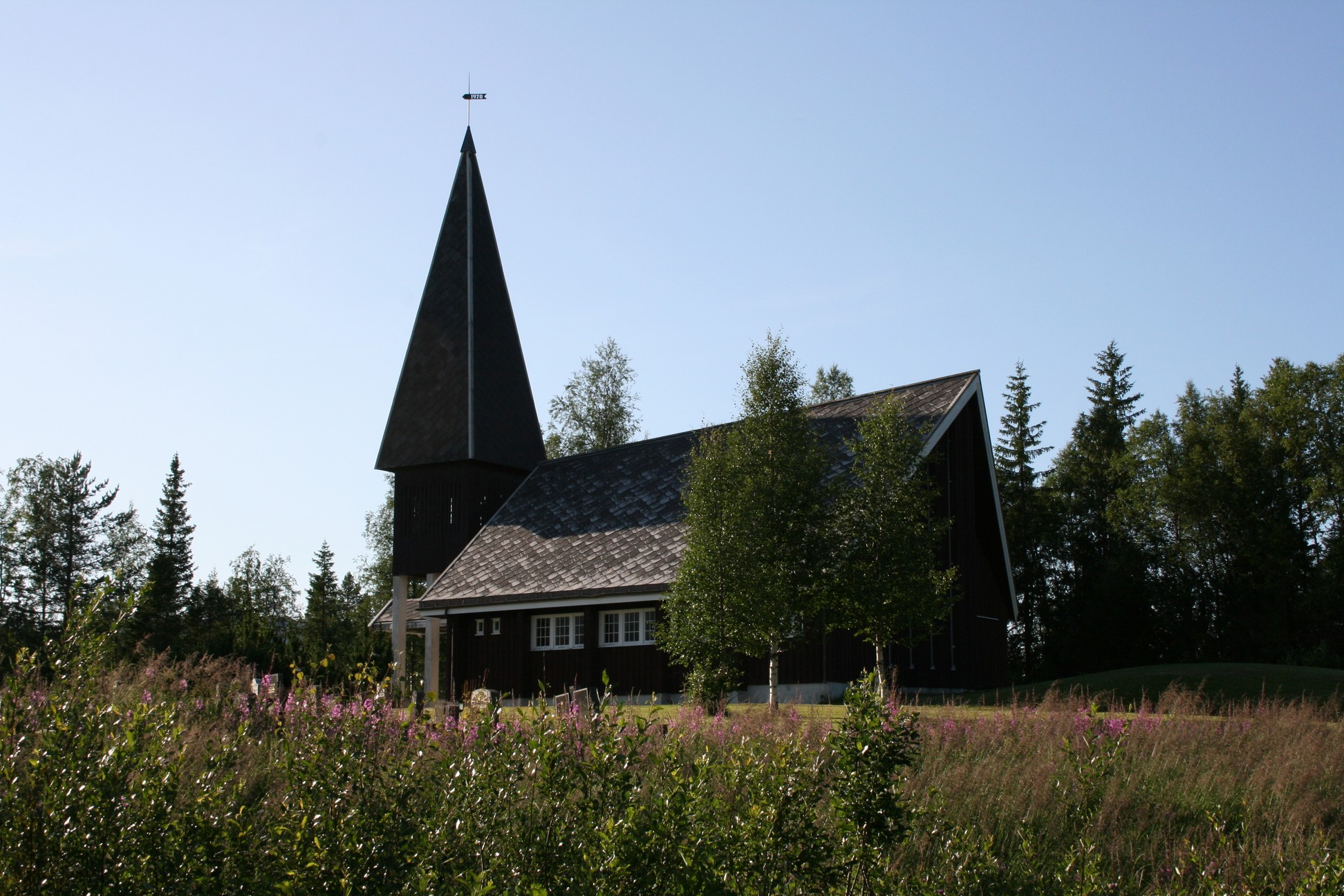
- View of the church
- Bjørhusdal Church
- 64.91922612°N 13.0788427°E
- Location: Namsskogan Municipality, Trøndelag
- Country: Norway
- Denomination: Church of Norway
- Churchmanship: Evangelical Lutheran

History
- Status: Parish church
- Founded: 1970
- Consecrated: 1970

Architecture
- Functional status: Active
- Architect: Arne Aursand
- Architectural type: Long church
- Completed: 1970 (56 years ago)

Specifications
- Capacity: 120
- Materials: Wood

Administration
- Diocese: Nidaros bispedømme
- Deanery: Namdal prosti
- Parish: Namsskogan
- Norwegian Cultural Heritage Site
- Type: Church
- Status: Not protected
- ID: 83905

Bjørhusdal Church (Norwegian: Bjørhusdal kirke) is a parish church of the Church of Norway in Namsskogan Municipality in Trøndelag county, Norway. It is located in the countryside about 3 kilometres (1.9 mi) west of the village of Namsskogan. It is one of the three churches for the Namsskogan parish which is part of the Namdal prosti (deanery) in the Diocese of Nidaros. The brown, wooden church was built in a long church style in 1970 using plans drawn up by the architect Arne Aursand. The church seats about 120 people and it serves the northern part of the municipality.

== See also ==
- List of churches in Nidaros
