= Brekkvasselv =

Village in Namsskogan Municipality, Norway

- Village
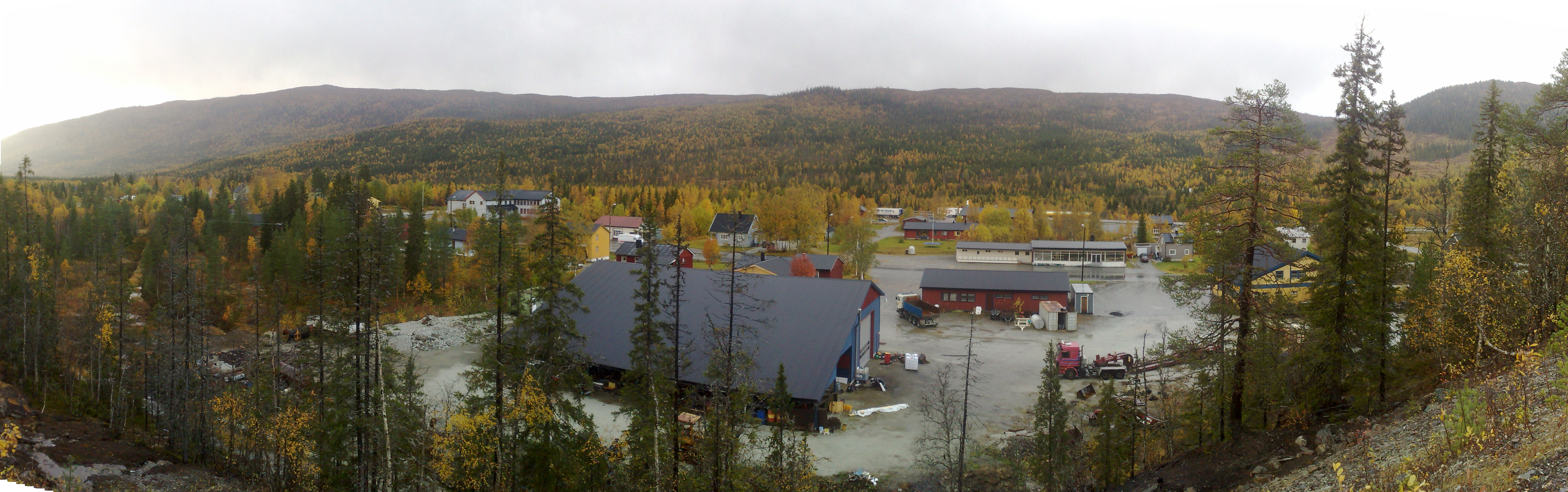
- View of the village
- Interactive map of Brekkvasselv
- Location within Trøndelag Location within Norway
- Coordinates: 64.8473°N 13.0179°E
- Country: Norway
- Region: Central Norway
- County: Trøndelag
- District: Namdalen
- Municipality: Namsskogan Municipality
- Elevation: 175 m (574 ft)
- Time zone: UTC+01:00 (CET)
  - Summer (DST): UTC+02:00 (CEST)
- Post Code: 7896 Brekkvasselv

Brekkvasselv is a village in Namsskogan Municipality in Trøndelag county, Norway. It is located along the river Namsen about 10 kilometres (6.2 mi) southwest of the village of Namsskogan and about 15 kilometres (9.3 mi) northeast of Trones. The village sits at the intersection of European Route E6 and Norwegian County Road 773 which heads east towards Røyrvik Municipality. The Nordlandsbanen railway line also runs through the village, stopping at Brekkvasselv Station. The village had 141 residents in 2012.
