= Vassås =

Village in Bindal Municipality, Norway

- Village
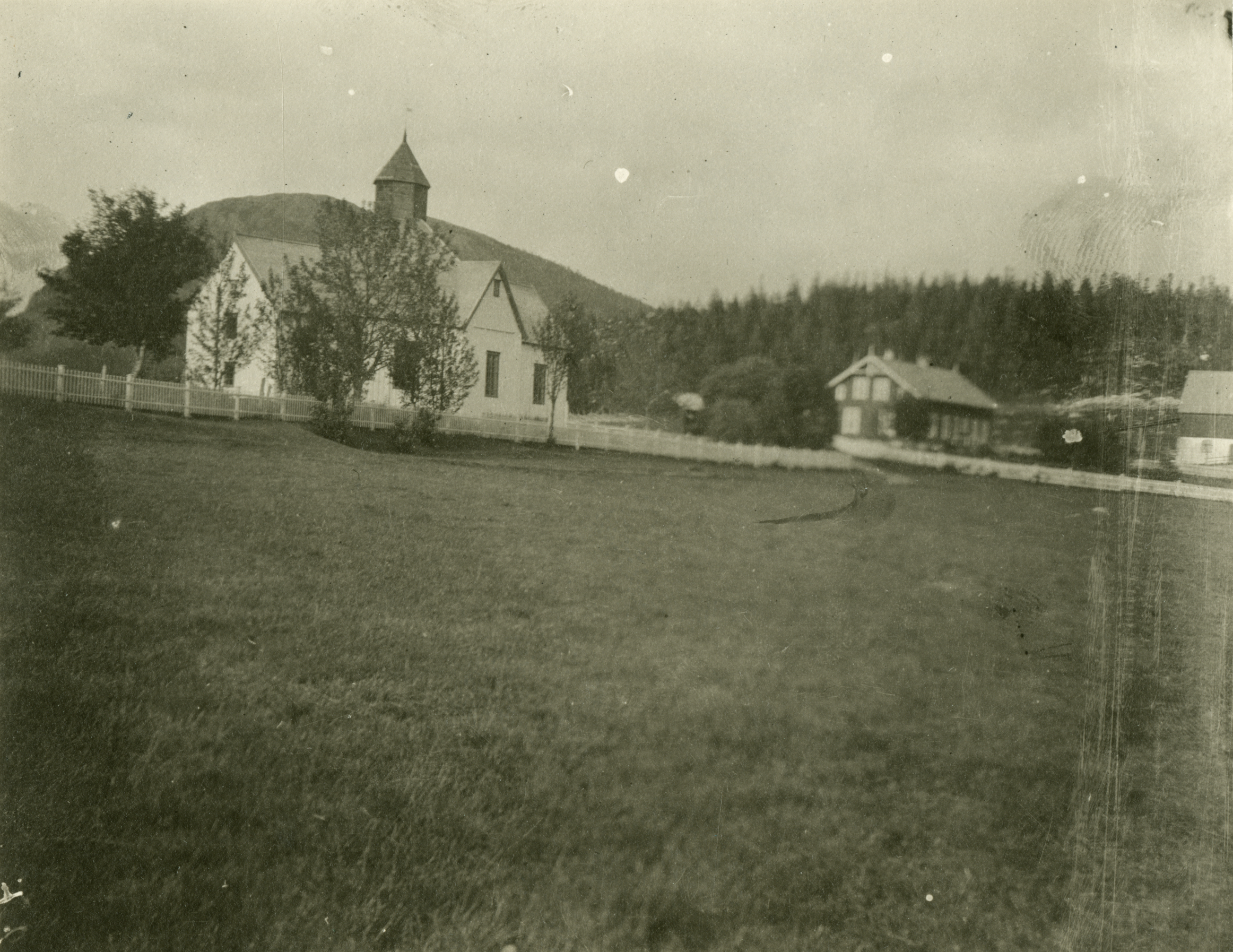
- View of the village church
- Interactive map of Vassås
- Location within Nordland Location within Norway
- Coordinates: 65.0961°N 12.4073°E
- Country: Norway
- Region: Northern Norway
- County: Nordland
- District: Helgeland
- Municipality: Bindal Municipality
- Elevation: 22 m (72 ft)
- Time zone: UTC+01:00 (CET)
  - Summer (DST): UTC+02:00 (CEST)
- Post Code: 7980 Terråk

Vassås is a small village in Bindal Municipality in Nordland county, Norway. It is located along the Tosen arm of the Bindalsfjorden, just north of the Vassås Bridge which connects the village to the larger village of Terråk. The village of Åbygda lies about 10 kilometres (6.2 mi) to the southeast. This is also the site of Vassås Church, the parish church for this part of Bindal.
