= Trones Church =

Church in Trøndelag, Norway

- Trones kirke
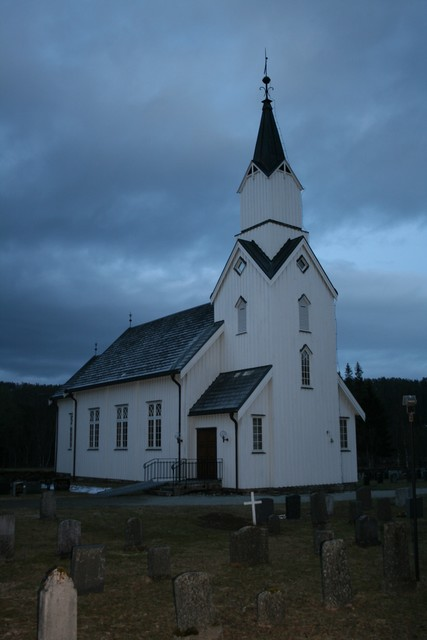
- View of the church
- Trones Church
- 64.73943206°N 12.84535244°E
- Location: Namsskogan Municipality, Trøndelag
- Country: Norway
- Denomination: Church of Norway
- Churchmanship: Evangelical Lutheran

History
- Status: Parish church
- Founded: 1832
- Consecrated: 1832

Architecture
- Functional status: Active
- Architect: Ole Scheistrøen
- Architectural type: Long church
- Completed: 1832 (194 years ago)

Specifications
- Capacity: 150
- Materials: Wood

Administration
- Diocese: Nidaros bispedømme
- Deanery: Namdal prosti
- Parish: Namsskogan
- Norwegian Cultural Heritage Site
- Type: Church
- Status: Automatically protected
- ID: 85674

Trones Church (Norwegian: Trones kirke) is a parish church of the Church of Norway in Namsskogan Municipality in Trøndelag county, Norway. It is located in the village of Trones. It is the main church for the Namsskogan parish which is part of the Namdal prosti (deanery) in the Diocese of Nidaros. The white, wooden church was built in a long church style in 1832 using plans drawn up by the architect Ole Scheistrøen. The church seats about 150 people.

== History ==
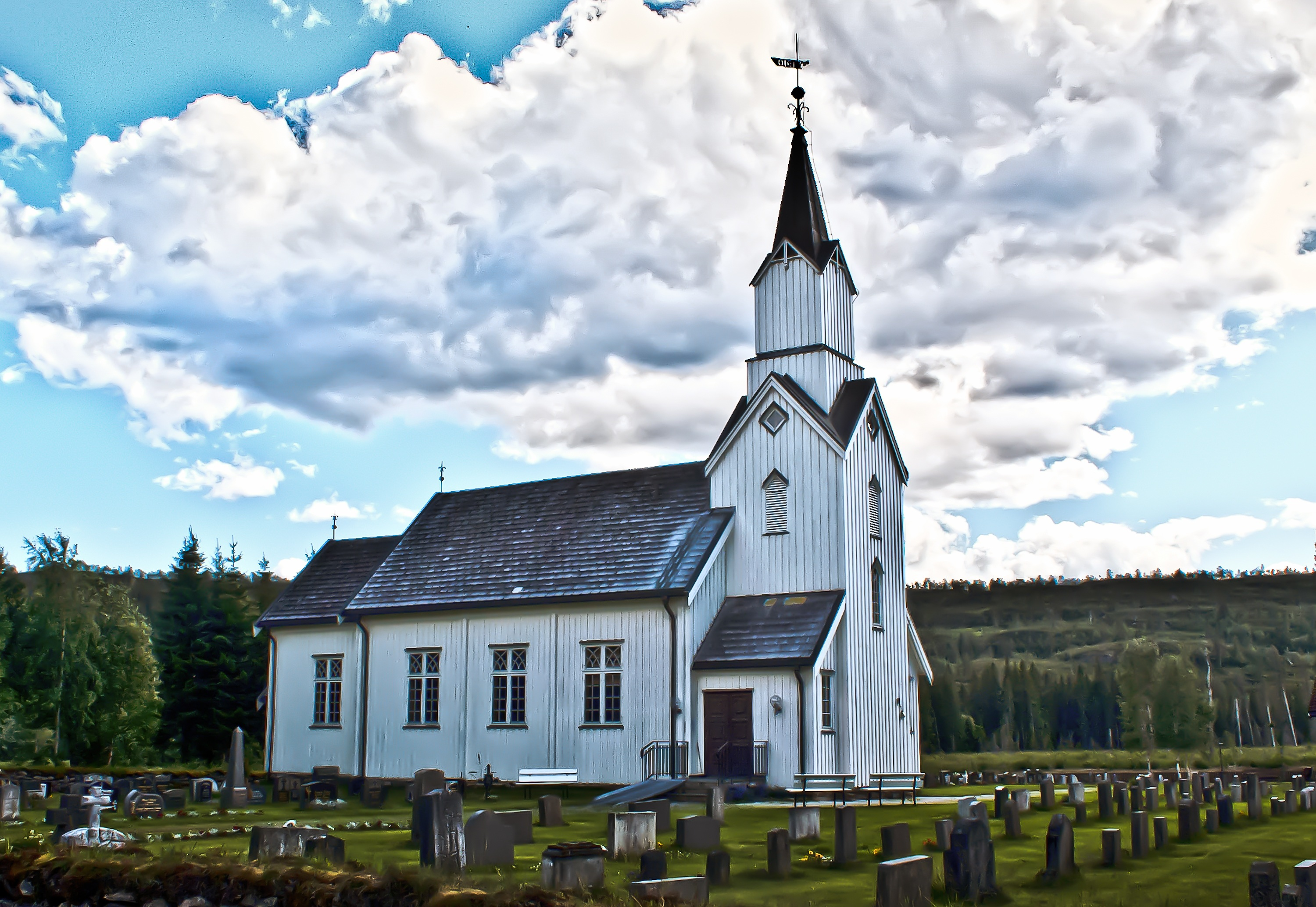
View of the church

A royal decree on 14 November 1822 granted the people of Namsskogan permission to construct a chapel to serve their area. After some time of fundraising and planning, the church was built and consecrated in 1832. In 1910, the chapel was renovated and rebuilt. During that time, the congregation met in the local school. Later, the chapel was upgraded from a chapel to a parish church status.

== See also ==
- List of churches in Nidaros
