= Åbygda =

Village in Bindal Municipality, Norway

Åbygda Aabygda (historic spelling)
- Village
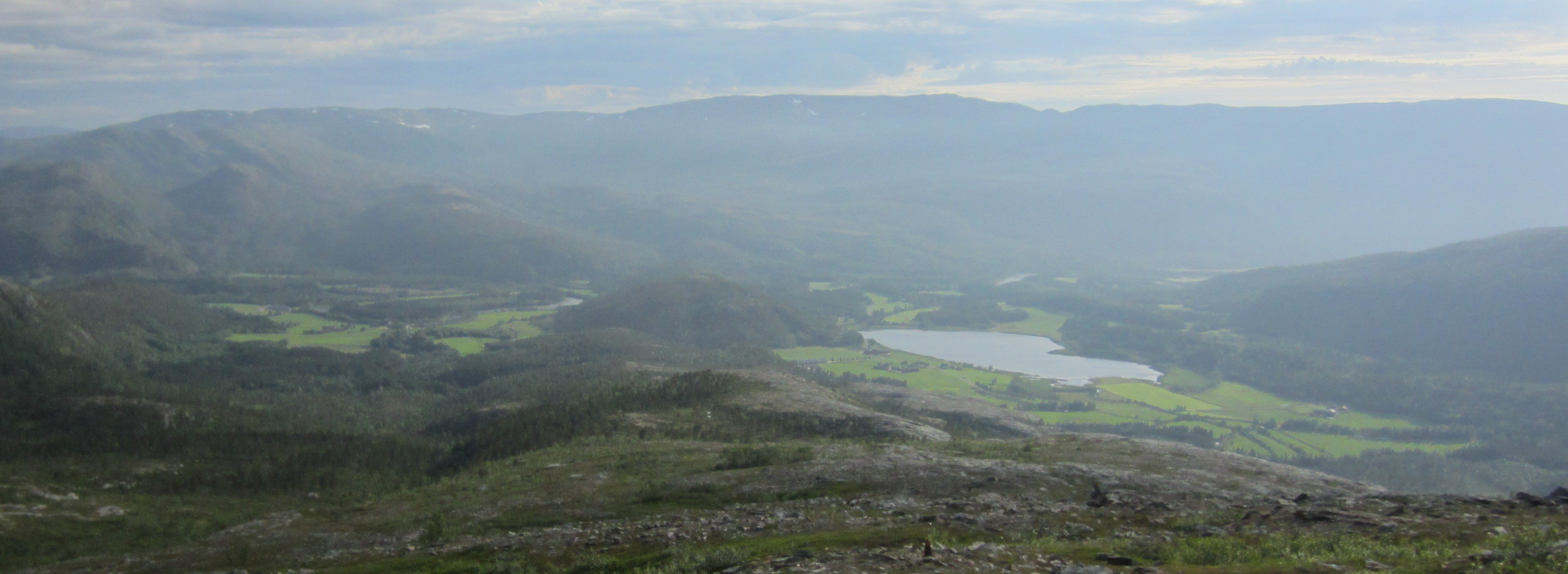
- Photography of Åbygda, taken from Skarstadfjellet
- Interactive map of Åbygda
- Location within Nordland Location within Norway
- Coordinates: 65.0478°N 12.5024°E
- Country: Norway
- Region: Northern Norway
- County: Nordland
- District: Helgeland
- Municipality: Bindal Municipality
- Elevation: 10 m (33 ft)
- Time zone: UTC+01:00 (CET)
  - Summer (DST): UTC+02:00 (CEST)
- Post Code: 7980 Terråk

Åbygda is a village in Bindal Municipality in Nordland county, Norway. The village is located along the river Åbjøra, about 10 kilometres (6.2 mi) southeast of the villages of Vassås and Terråk.

Åbygda is the birthplace of Otto Sverdrup, a polar explorer, who was the skipper on the polar expedition ship Fram to both the North Pole and South Pole.
