= Fjellvatnet =

Lake in Nordland, Norway

- Interactive map of the lake
- Location: Bindal Municipality and Brønnøy Municipality, Nordland
- Coordinates: 65.2553°N 12.5600°E
- Primary outflows: Eidvatnet
- Basin countries: Norway
- Max. length: 7.5 kilometres (4.7 mi)
- Max. width: 2.5 kilometres (1.6 mi)
- Surface area: 5.77 km^{2} (2.23 sq mi)
- Shore length^{1}: 39.4 kilometres (24.5 mi)
- Surface elevation: 14 metres (46 ft)
- References: NVE
- ^{1} Shore length is not a well-defined measure.

Fjellvatnet is a lake that is located in Nordland county, Norway. The 5.77-square-kilometre (2.23 sq mi) lake lies mostly in Bindal Municipality, but the far eastern part of the lake extends into the neighboring Brønnøy Municipality where it is known as Storvatnet. It flows out through a channel on the southwestern side of the lake and flows into the neighboring lake Eidvatnet.

Fish found in Fjellvatnet are arctic char, sea trout and wild salmon.

== See also ==
- List of lakes in Norway
- Geography of Norway
