= Eidvatnet =

Lake in Bindal, Norway

- Interactive map of the lake
- Location: Bindal Municipality, Nordland
- Coordinates: 65.2448°N 12.4934°E
- Primary inflows: Fjellvatnet
- Primary outflows: Hardangsfjorden
- Basin countries: Norway
- Max. length: 3.7 kilometres (2.3 mi)
- Max. width: 1.5 kilometres (0.93 mi)
- Surface area: 2 km^{2} (0.77 sq mi)
- Shore length^{1}: 14 kilometres (8.7 mi)
- Surface elevation: 9 metres (30 ft)
- References: NVE
- ^{1} Shore length is not a well-defined measure.

Eidvatnet is a lake that is located in Bindal Municipality in Nordland county, Norway. The 2-square-kilometre (0.77 sq mi) lake lies in the northern part of Bindal that is very sparsely populated. The lake Fjellvatnet flows to the southwest into this lake.

== See also ==
- List of lakes in Norway
- Geography of Norway
