= Heilhornet =

Mountain in Nordland, Norway

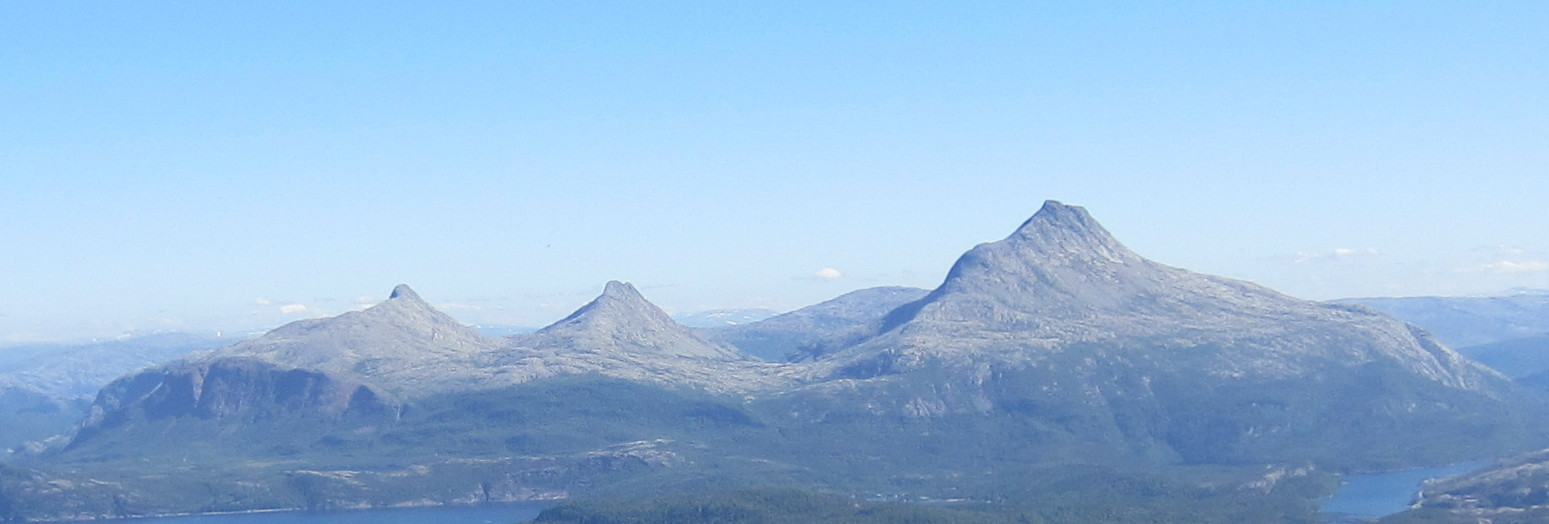
- Heilhornet (right) viewed from Tyskenghatten

Highest point
- Elevation: 1,058 m (3,471 ft)
- Coordinates: 65.0768°N 12.1392°E

Geography
- Interactive map of the mountain
- Location: Nordland, Norway

Heilhornet is a mountain in Bindal Municipality in Nordland, Norway. It has a height of 1,058 metres (3,471 ft) and is a landmark visible from the sea lane. The Norwegian County Road 17 runs along the western base of the mountain.
