= Skorovatn Chapel =

Church in Trøndelag, Norway

- Skorovatn kapell
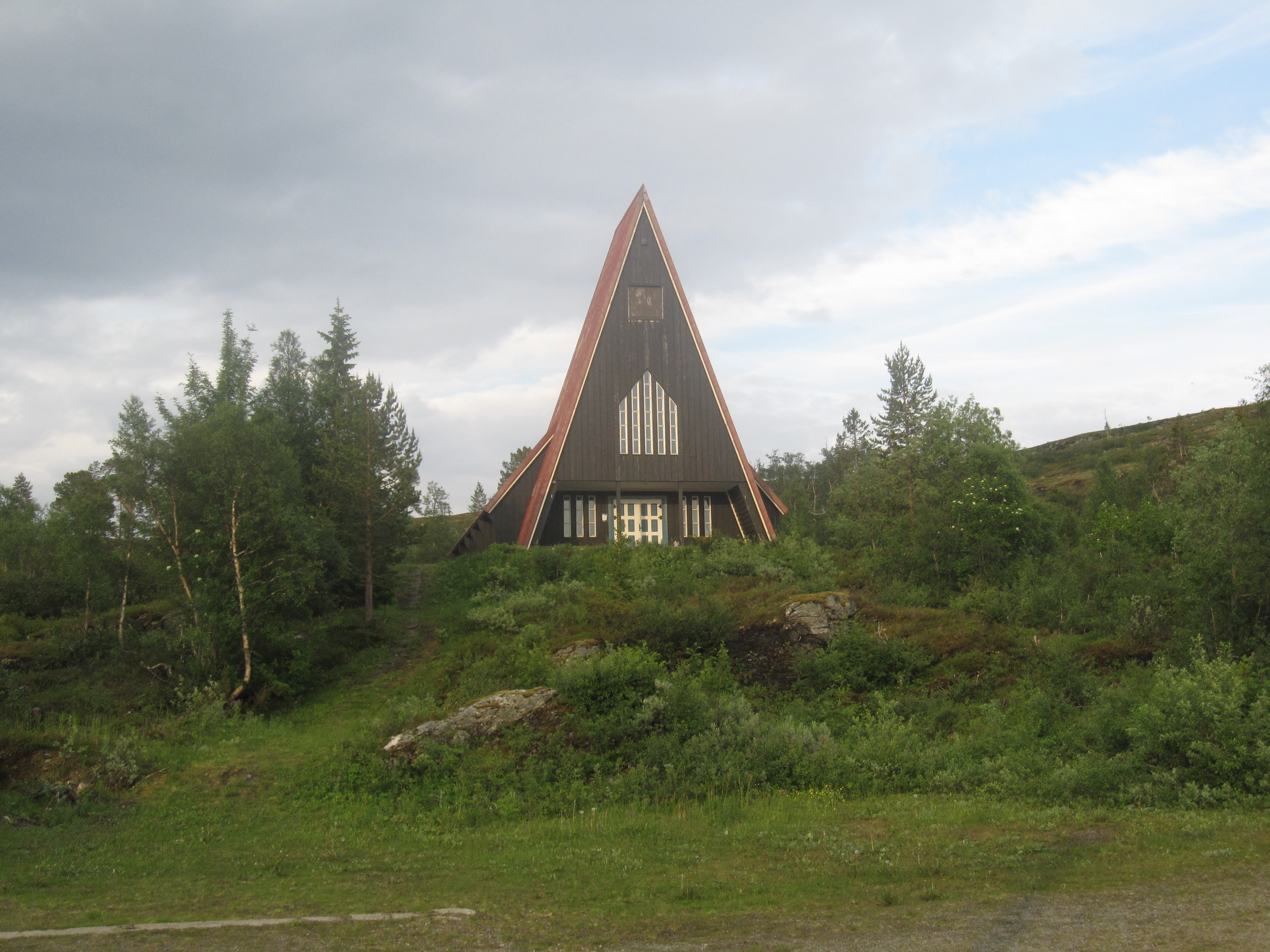
- View of the church
- Skorovatn Chapel
- 64.64310873°N 13.12072009°E
- Location: Namsskogan Municipality, Trøndelag
- Country: Norway
- Denomination: Church of Norway
- Churchmanship: Evangelical Lutheran

History
- Status: Parish church
- Founded: 1965
- Consecrated: 5 Sept 1965

Architecture
- Functional status: Active
- Architect: Arne Aursand
- Architectural type: Long church
- Completed: 1965 (61 years ago)

Specifications
- Capacity: 170
- Materials: Wood

Administration
- Diocese: Nidaros bispedømme
- Deanery: Namdal prosti
- Parish: Namsskogan
- Norwegian Cultural Heritage Site
- Type: Church
- Status: Not protected
- ID: 85475

Skorovatn Chapel (Norwegian: Skorovatn kapell) is a parish church of the Church of Norway in Namsskogan Municipality in Trøndelag county, Norway. It is located in the old mining village of Skorovatn. It is one of three churches for the Namsskogan parish which is part of the Namdal prosti (deanery) in the Diocese of Nidaros. The brown, wooden church with a red roof was built in a long church style in 1965 using plans drawn up by the architect Arne Aursand. The church seats about 170 people.

== History ==
The church was built in 1965 to serve the mining village of Skorovatn. The church construction was financed by Elkem and the municipality. The church was consecrated on 5 September 1965 by the Bishop Tord Godal. The local mine closed in 1984, so since then, there are only a few residents left in the area, so the chapel is not used as regularly as it used to. It is also occasionally used for concerts.

== See also ==
- List of churches in Nidaros
