= Skorovatn =

Village in Namsskogan Municipality, Norway

- Village
- Interactive map of Skorovatn
- Location within Trøndelag Location within Norway
- Coordinates: 64.6439°N 13.1135°E
- Country: Norway
- Region: Central Norway
- County: Trøndelag
- District: Namdalen
- Municipality: Namsskogan Municipality
- Elevation: 462 m (1,516 ft)
- Time zone: UTC+01:00 (CET)
  - Summer (DST): UTC+02:00 (CEST)
- Post Code: 7893 Skorovatn

Skorovatn is a village in Namsskogan Municipality in Trøndelag county, Norway. The old Skorovas Gruber mine is here, but it closed in 1984. Skorovatn is located right on the border with Røyrvik Municipality, just south of the lake Tunnsjøflyan and the large lake Tunnsjøen. Skorovatn is about 20 kilometres (12 mi) east of the main European route E6 highway that crosses Namsskogan Municipality. Skorovatn Chapel is located in the village.

== Mine ==
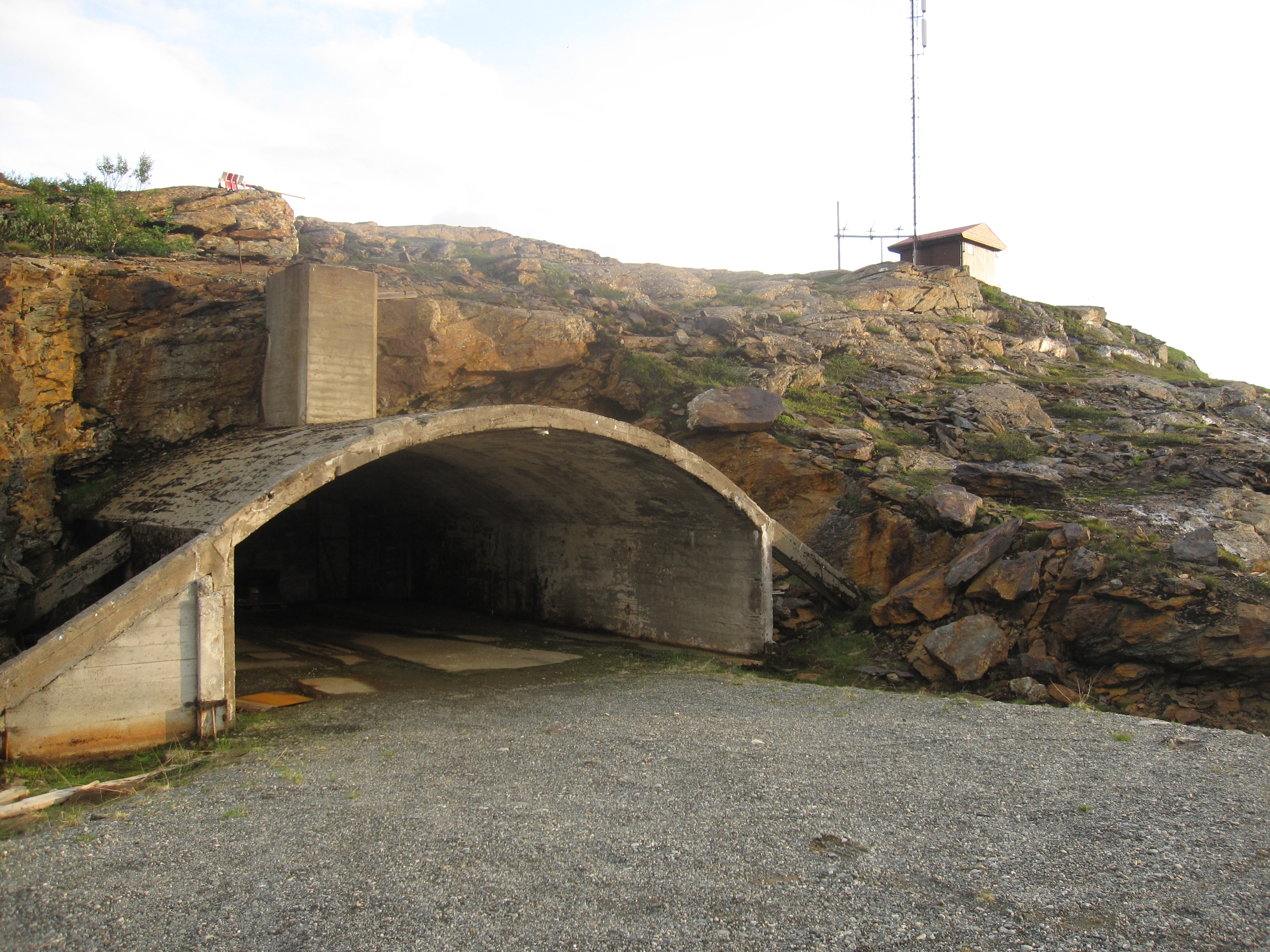
View of the entrance to the mine

The Skorovas Gruber mine was the first in Norway to exploit a sulphide ore deposit and produced zinc and copper. The mine discharged tailings into a nearby lake, but the contamination from this process has been deemed relatively slight. The mine closed in 1984. Before its closing, virtually everyone that lived in and around Skorovatn worked directly or indirectly for the mining operation.
