= Bindalsfjorden =

Fjord in Nordland, Norway

- Bindalsfjord
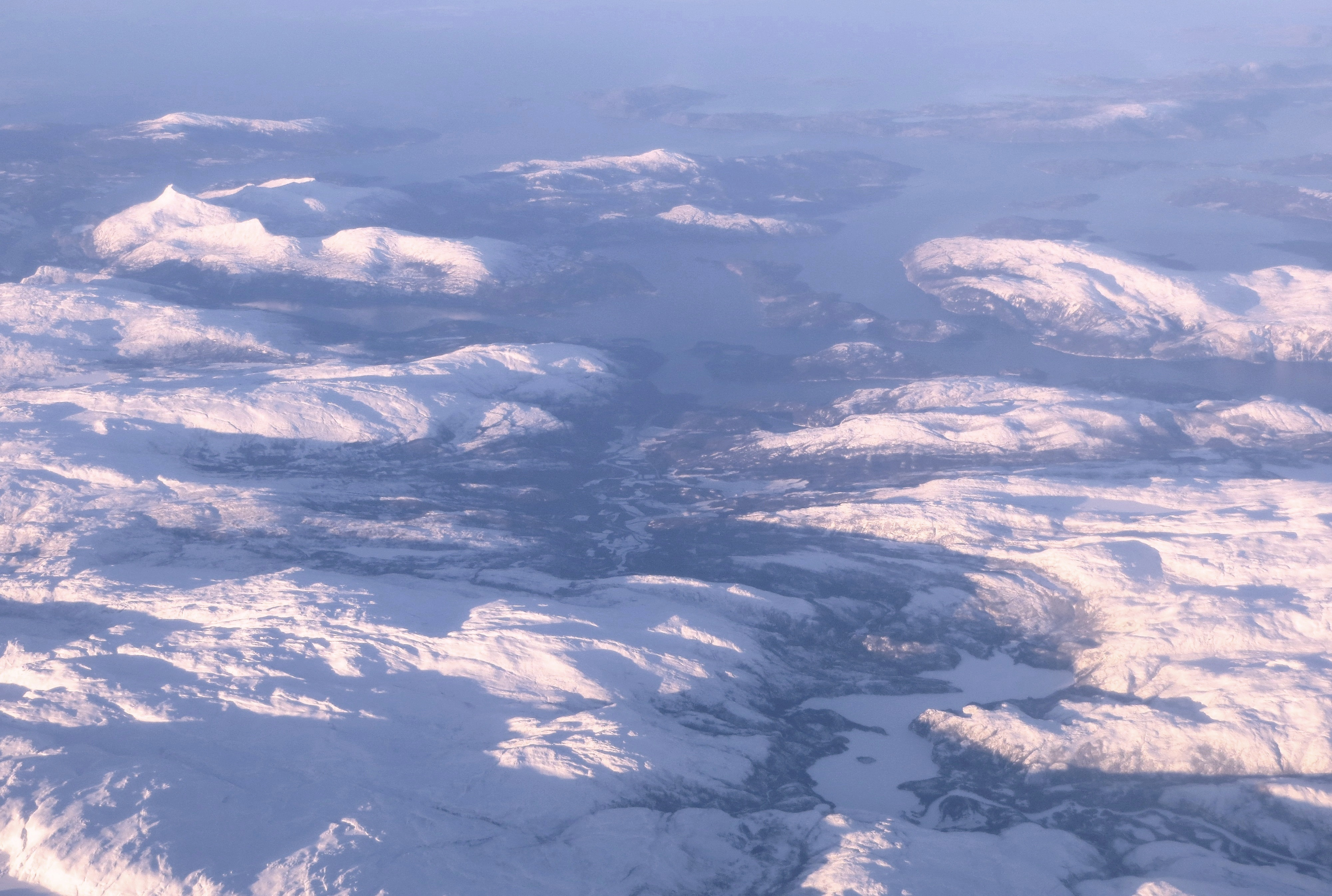
- View of the fjord
- Interactive map of the fjord
- Location: Nordland county, Norway
- Coordinates: 65.2070°N 12.1336°E
- Type: Fjord
- Basin countries: Norway
- Max. length: 71 kilometres (44 mi)
- Max. depth: 741 metres (2,431 ft)

Bindalsfjorden is a fjord in the southern part of Nordland county, Norway. The fjord is mostly located in Bindal Municipality, with a small part in neighboring Sømna Municipality.

== Geography ==
The 71-kilometre (44 mi) long fjord begins near the villages of Terråk and Vassås, where the Sørfjorden and Tosenfjorden join together. It then flows northwest, past the Bindalseidet isthmus, and then southwest past the village of Holm, before the mouth of the fjord by the island of Austra.

There are several large arms that branch off of the fjord, including the Ursfjorden to the north and the Kjella and Sørfjorden to the south. The innermost part of the Bindalsfjorden is known as the "Tosen". The deepest part of the fjord is by the island of Stavøya, where it is 741 metres (2,431 ft) deep.
