= Mellingsvatnet =

Lake in Namsskogan and Grane, Norway

Mellingsvatnet (Norwegian) Veelnjesjaevrie (Southern Sami)
- Interactive map of the lake
- Location: Namsskogan, Trøndelag and Grane, Nordland
- Coordinates: 65.1212°N 13.2380°E
- Basin countries: Norway
- Max. length: 6 kilometres (3.7 mi)
- Max. width: 1 kilometre (0.62 mi)
- Surface area: 4.47 km^{2} (1.73 sq mi)
- Shore length^{1}: 32 kilometres (20 mi)
- Surface elevation: 274 metres (899 ft)
- References: NVE
- ^{1} Shore length is not a well-defined measure.

Mellingsvatnet (Norwegian) or Veelnjesjaevrie (Southern Sami) is a 4.47-square-kilometre (1.73 sq mi) lake in Norway. The lake lies in Namsskogan Municipality (in Trøndelag county) and Grane Municipality (in Nordland county). The lake lies about 1.5 kilometres (0.93 mi) west of the European route E6 highway on the border of the two municipalities.

== See also ==
- List of lakes in Norway
- Geography of Norway
