= Terråk =

Village in Bindal Municipality, Norway

- Village
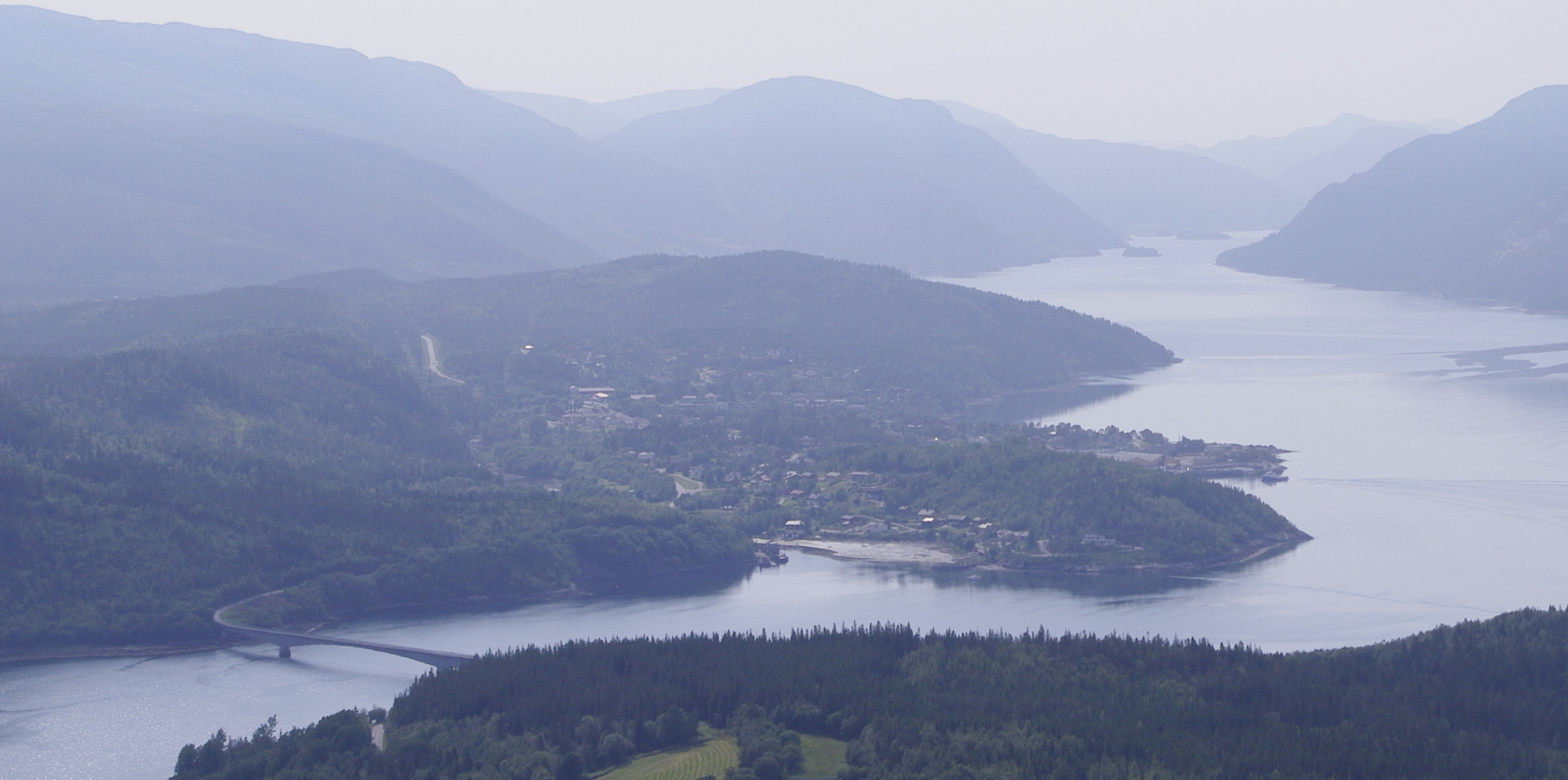
- Photography of Terråk, taken from Mulingen
- Interactive map of Terråk
- Location within Nordland Location within Norway
- Coordinates: 65.0850°N 12.3692°E
- Country: Norway
- Region: Northern Norway
- County: Nordland
- District: Helgeland
- Municipality: Bindal Municipality

Area
  - Total: 0.62 km^{2} (0.24 sq mi)
- Elevation: 20 m (66 ft)

Population (2024)
  - Total: 527
  - Density: 850/km^{2} (2,200/sq mi)
- Time zone: UTC+01:00 (CET)
  - Summer (DST): UTC+02:00 (CEST)
- Post Code: 7980 Terråk

Terråk is the administrative centre of Bindal Municipality in Nordland country, Norway. The village is located in the eastern part of the municipality, along the shore of the Sørfjorden arm of the Bindalsfjorden. The nearby Vassås Bridge connects Terråk to the village of Vassås just to the north.

Terråk is the commercial center for the municipality. Boat building has been historically important in the area, which is why the village hosts the annual Nordland boat regatta.

The 0.62-square-kilometre (150-acre) village has a population (2024) of 526 and a population density of 850 inhabitants per square kilometre (2,200/sq mi).
