= Namsskogan (village) =

Village in Namsskogan Municipality, Norway

Namsskogan Namsskogan sentrum
- Village
- Interactive map of Namsskogan
- Location within Trøndelag Location within Norway
- Coordinates: 64.9288°N 13.1595°E
- Country: Norway
- Region: Central Norway
- County: Trøndelag
- District: Namdalen
- Municipality: Namsskogan Municipality

Area
  - Total: 0.29 km^{2} (0.11 sq mi)
- Elevation: 215 m (705 ft)

Population (2024)
  - Total: 220
  - Density: 759/km^{2} (1,970/sq mi)
- Time zone: UTC+01:00 (CET)
  - Summer (DST): UTC+02:00 (CEST)
- Post Code: 7890 Namsskogan

Namsskogan is the administrative centre of Namsskogan Municipality in Trøndelag county, Norway. The village is located in the Namdalen valley on an island in the middle of the river Namsen, although it also includes land on both sides of the river. The European route E06 highway and the Nordlandsbanen railway line both run through the village, with the train stopping at Namsskogan Station. The village of Brekkvasselv lies about 12 kilometres (7.5 mi) to the south. Bjørhusdal Church is located about 4 kilometres (2.5 mi) west of the village.

The 0.29-square-kilometre (72-acre) village has a population (2024) of 220 and a population density of 759 inhabitants per square kilometre (1,970/sq mi).

== Name ==
The name of the village (and municipality) was created in 1923. The first element is the name of the river Namsen and the last element is the plural form of skog which means "woods". Therefore, the meaning of the name is "the woodlands around Namsen".
