= Namsskogan Municipality =

Municipality in Trøndelag, Norway

Namsskogan Municipality Namsskogan kommune Laakesvuemie
- Municipality
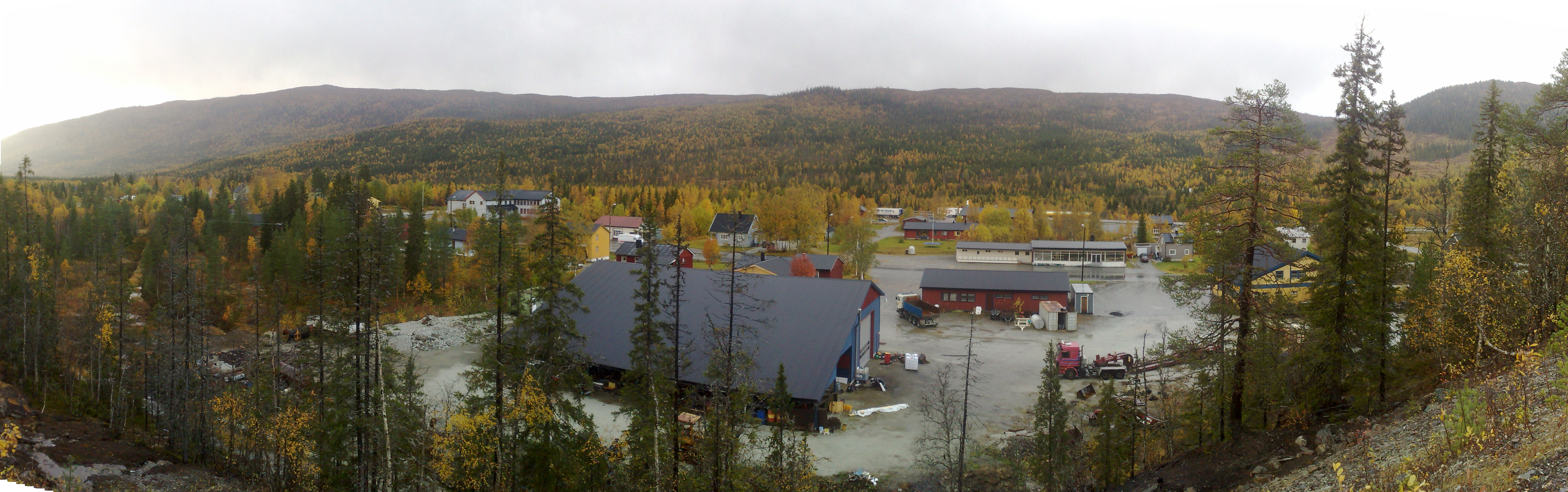
- View of the village of Brekkvasselv in Namsskogan

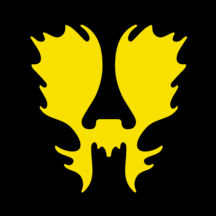
- Flag Coat of arms

- Trøndelag within Norway

- Namsskogan within Trøndelag
- Coordinates: 64°52′19″N 12°58′35″E
- Country: Norway
- County: Trøndelag
- District: Namdalen
- Established: 1 July 1923
  - Preceded by: Grong Municipality
- Administrative centre: Namsskogan

Government
  - Mayor (2023): Elisabeth Vollmo Bjørhusdal (LL)

Area
  - Total: 1,417.15 km^{2} (547.16 sq mi)
  - Land: 1,353.12 km^{2} (522.44 sq mi)
  - Water: 64.03 km^{2} (24.72 sq mi) 4.5%
  - Rank: #64 in Norway
- Highest elevation: 1,167.62 m (3,830.8 ft)

Population (2024)
  - Total: 810
  - Rank: #345 in Norway
  - Density: 0.6/km^{2} (1.6/sq mi)
  - Change (10 years): ▼ −12.1%
- Demonym: Namsskoging

Official language
  - Norwegian form: Neutral
- Time zone: UTC+01:00 (CET)
  - Summer (DST): UTC+02:00 (CEST)
- ISO 3166 code: NO-5044
- Website: Official website

Namsskogan or Laakesvuemie (Southern Sami) is a municipality in Trøndelag, Norway. Namsskogan is located in the upper part of the long Namdalen valley region. The administrative centre of the municipality is the village of Namsskogan. Other villages in the municipality include Brekkvasselv, Smalåsen, Skorovatn, and Trones.

The village of Namsskogan lies along the river Namsen in the northern part of the municipality. The European route E6 highway runs through the village.

The 1,417-square-kilometre (547 sq mi) municipality is the 64th largest by area out of the 357 municipalities in Norway. Namsskogan Municipality is the 345th most populous municipality in Norway with a population of 810. The municipality's population density is 0.6 inhabitants per square kilometre (1.6/sq mi) and its population has decreased by 12.1% over the previous 10-year period.

Economy: In 2024, the municipality earned some hundred thousand Euro from the sale of hydroelectric power to a facility (in the municipality), that is doing mining of cryptocurrency; The community has already done a deal that is supposed to bring in money in 2025: Norwegian kroner 9.3 million will be the profit, according to media.

== General information ==
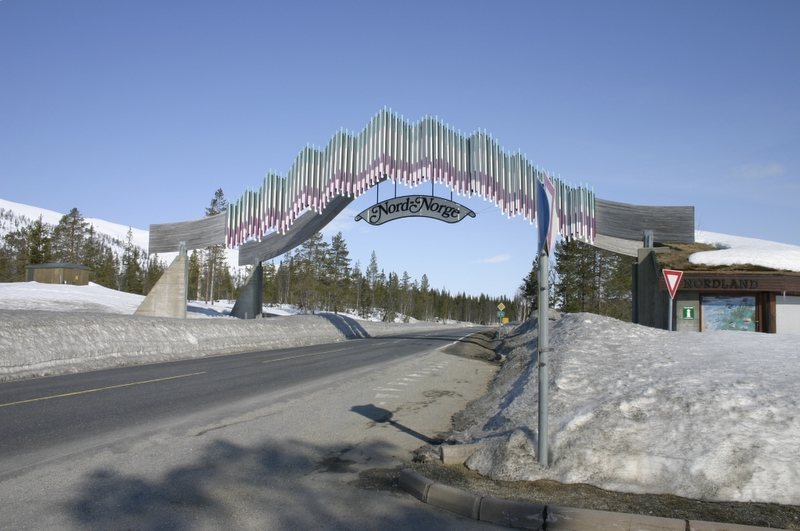
E6 enters Nord-Norge at the northern end of Namsskogan

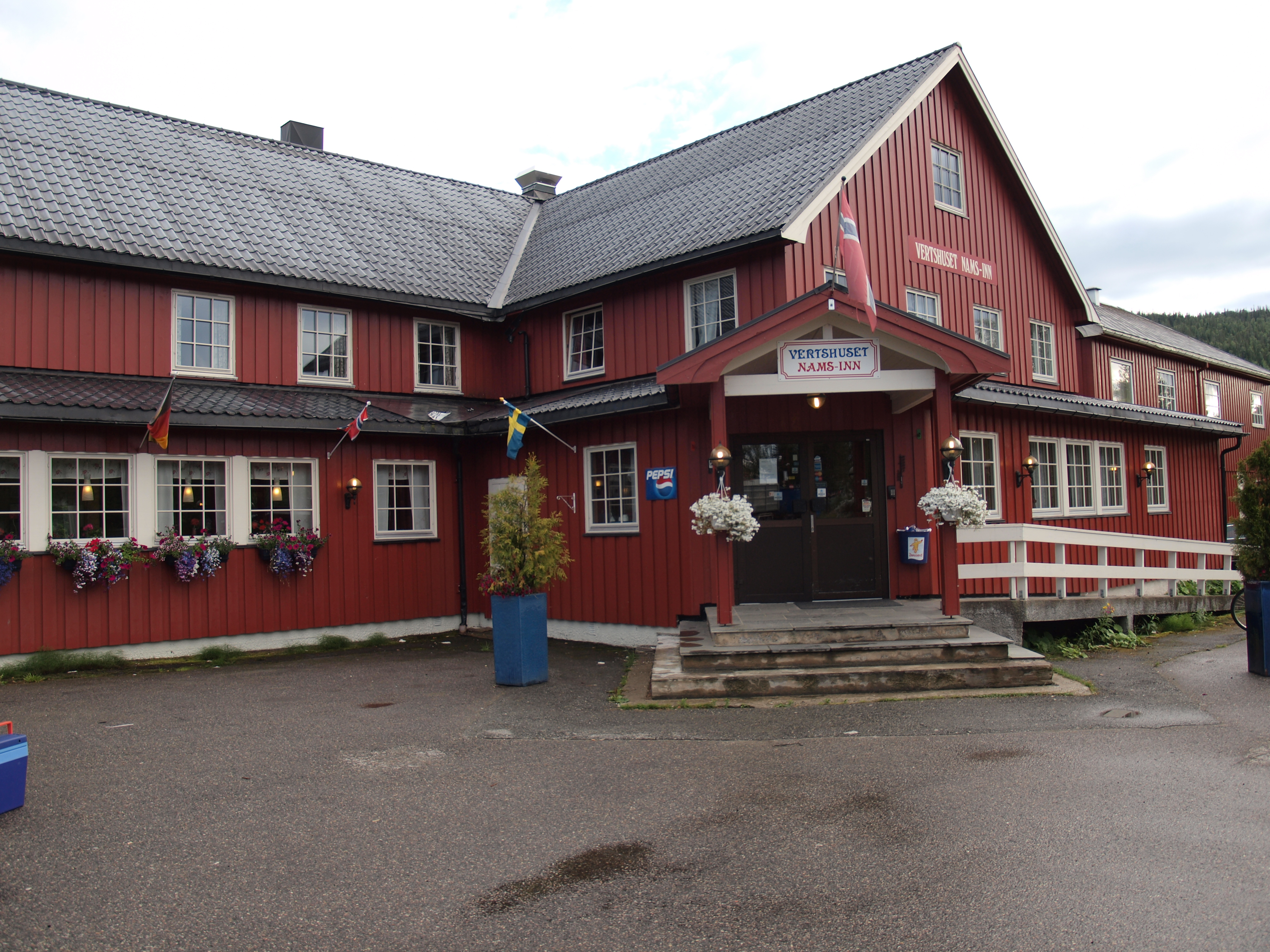
"Nams-Inn" is a small hotel in Namsskogan.

The municipality of Namsskogan was established on 1 July 1923 when it was separated from the large Grong Municipality. Initially, the population of Namsskogan Municipality was 469. The municipal boundaries have not changed since. On 1 January 2018, the municipality switched from the old Nord-Trøndelag county to the new Trøndelag county.

=== Name ===
The municipality is named Namsskogan, a name which was created in 1923. The first element is Nams- which comes from the name of the river Namsen and the last element is the plural form of skog which means "woods". Therefore, the meaning of the name is "the woodlands around Namsen". The river name has an uncertain origin. The first part of the river name comes from the Old Norse word Nauma) which has an unknown meaning, but it may come from the word naust which means "boat". The second part of the river name -sen (Old Norse: sær) which means "sea".

=== Coat of arms ===
The coat of arms was granted on 21 December 1984. The official blazon is "Sable, moose antlers Or" (Norwegian: I svart et gull elggevir). This means the arms have a black field (background) and the charge is a set of moose antlers. The antlers have a tincture of Or which means the design is commonly colored yellow, but if it is made out of metal, then gold is used. The design was chosen to symbolize the heavily forested municipality where one can find many moose. The arms are based on a very large antler, with a rare golden color, which hangs on the municipal hall. The arms were designed by Nora Stommyrbakken and Einar H. Skjervold. The municipal flag has the same design as the coat of arms.

=== Churches ===
The Church of Norway has one parish (sokn) within Namsskogan Municipality. It is part of the Namdal prosti (deanery) in the Diocese of Nidaros.

Churches in Namsskogan Municipality
Parish (sokn)	Church name	Location of the church	Year built
Namsskogan	Trones Church	Trones	1832
Namsskogan	Bjørhusdal Church	Namsskogan	1970
Namsskogan	Skorovatn Chapel	Skorovatn	1965

== Geography ==
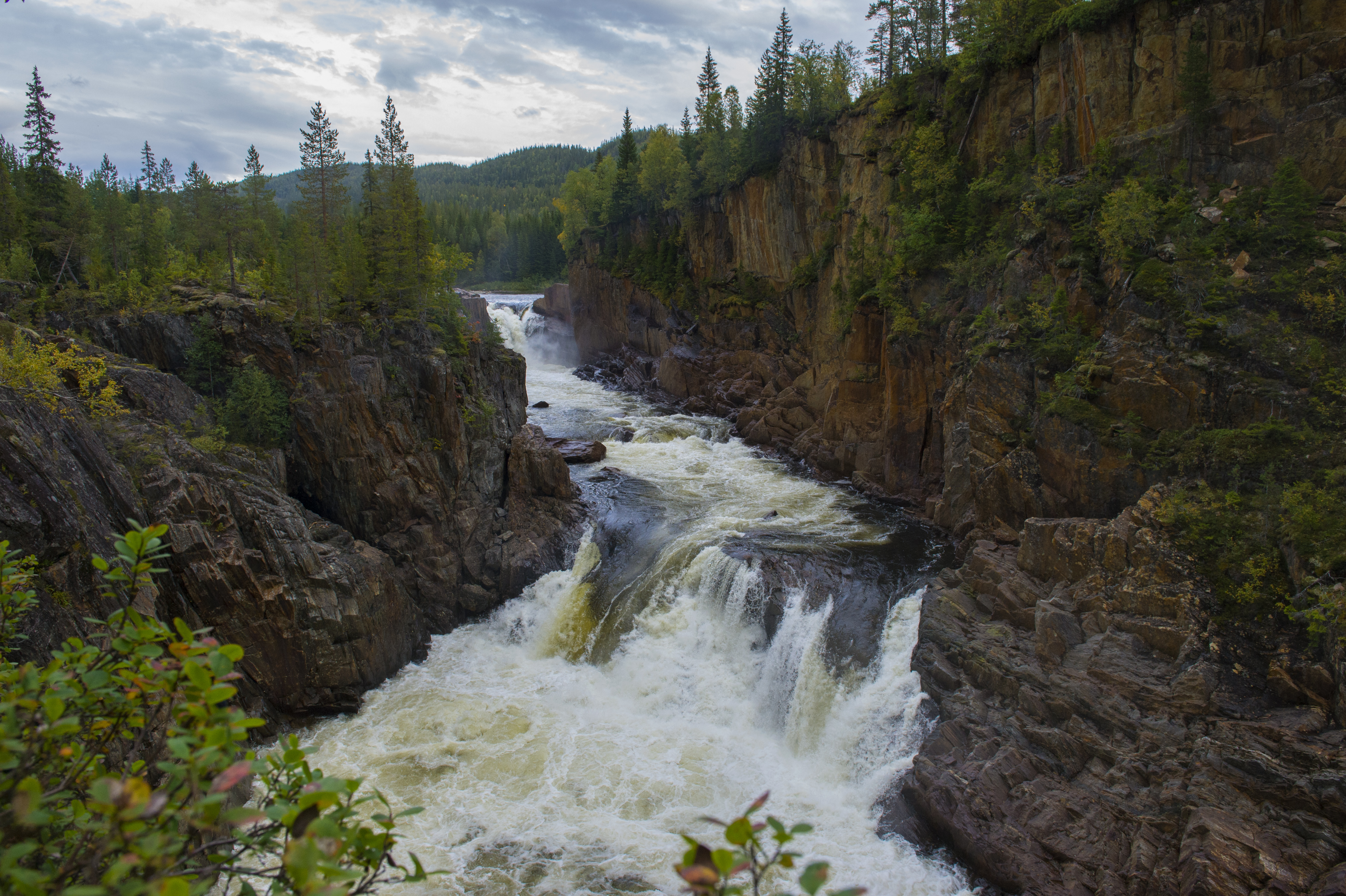
Trongfossen waterfall, Namsen

Namsskogan is located in the northeast part of Trøndelag county. It is a heavily forested area with several large lakes including Kalvvatnet, Mellingsvatnet, Frøyningen, Storgåsvatnet, and Tunnsjøflyan. The river Namsen runs south through the Namdalen valley. The extreme northeastern part of the municipality is part of Børgefjell National Park. The highest point in the municipality is the 1,167.62-metre (3,830.8 ft) tall mountain Gisen (Southern Sami: Jijse).

== Climate ==
Namsskogan, located inland in the upper part of Namdalen valley, has a boreal climate, but with more winter precipitation than in most other boreal climates, so there is often a lot of snow on the ground in winter. The all-time high 34.4 °C (93.9 °F) is from July 2019. Warmest month on record was July 2014 with monthly mean 19.6 °C (67.3 °F), average daily high 27 °C (81 °F) and 8 days with high at or above 30 °C (86 °F). The all-time low −35.6 °C (−32.1 °F) was recorded January 2010. The coldest month in recent decades was December 2010 with monthly mean −11.1 °C (12.0 °F) and average daily high −7 °C (19 °F). The weather station started recording in 1895; there might be colder lows recorded before 2006.

Climate data for Namsskogan 1991-2020 (140 m, avg high/low 2011-2020, extremes 2006-2025)
Month	Jan	Feb	Mar	Apr	May	Jun	Jul	Aug	Sep	Oct	Nov	Dec	Year
Record high °C (°F)	8.1 (46.6)	9.3 (48.7)	14.9 (58.8)	19.3 (66.7)	29.8 (85.6)	31.3 (88.3)	34.4 (93.9)	29.6 (85.3)	25.3 (77.5)	18.7 (65.7)	11.3 (52.3)	8.3 (46.9)	34.4 (93.9)
Mean daily maximum °C (°F)	−3 (27)	−1 (30)	2 (36)	7 (45)	13 (55)	17 (63)	20 (68)	19 (66)	14 (57)	7 (45)	2 (36)	−1 (30)	8 (47)
Daily mean °C (°F)	−4.5 (23.9)	−4.9 (23.2)	−2.4 (27.7)	2.1 (35.8)	6.9 (44.4)	11.5 (52.7)	14.8 (58.6)	13.4 (56.1)	9 (48)	3.4 (38.1)	−0.7 (30.7)	−3.6 (25.5)	3.7 (38.7)
Mean daily minimum °C (°F)	−7 (19)	−7 (19)	−6 (21)	−3 (27)	2 (36)	7 (45)	10 (50)	8 (46)	6 (43)	1 (34)	−2 (28)	−5 (23)	0 (33)
Record low °C (°F)	−35.6 (−32.1)	−34.8 (−30.6)	−30.5 (−22.9)	−19.8 (−3.6)	−7.5 (18.5)	−2.2 (28.0)	−0.6 (30.9)	−2 (28)	−8.3 (17.1)	−12.7 (9.1)	−27.5 (−17.5)	−29.5 (−21.1)	−35.6 (−32.1)
Average precipitation mm (inches)	144.9 (5.70)	121 (4.8)	121.1 (4.77)	77.9 (3.07)	57.2 (2.25)	75.3 (2.96)	82.3 (3.24)	83.3 (3.28)	124.4 (4.90)	123.3 (4.85)	116.1 (4.57)	139.8 (5.50)	1,266.6 (49.89)
Average precipitation days (≥ 1.0 mm)	17	16	16	13	12	13	12	12	15	15	15	18	174
Source 1: yr.no/Norwegian Meteorological Institute
Source 2: eklima/met.no

== Government ==
Namsskogan Municipality is responsible for primary education (through 10th grade), outpatient health services, senior citizen services, welfare and other social services, zoning, economic development, and municipal roads and utilities. The municipality is governed by a municipal council of directly elected representatives. The mayor is indirectly elected by a vote of the municipal council. The municipality is under the jurisdiction of the Trøndelag District Court and the Frostating Court of Appeal.

Municipal waste management has since 2020 been handled by the inter-municipal Midtre Namdal Avfallsselskap, with ReTrans Midt handling waste collection.

=== Municipal council ===
The municipal council (Kommunestyre) of Namsskogan Municipality is made up of 13 representatives that are elected to four year terms. The tables below show the current and historical composition of the council by political party.

Namsskogan kommunestyre 2023–2027
Party name (in Norwegian)	Number of representatives
Labour Party (Arbeiderpartiet)	5
Centre Party (Senterpartiet)	3
Optimum (Optimum)	5
Total number of members:	13

Namsskogan kommunestyre 2019–2023
Party name (in Norwegian)	Number of representatives
Labour Party (Arbeiderpartiet)	7
Centre Party (Senterpartiet)	3
Socialist Left Party (Sosialistisk Venstreparti)	1
Optimum (Optimum)	2
Total number of members:	13

Namskogan kommunestyre 2015–2019
Party name (in Norwegian)	Number of representatives
Labour Party (Arbeiderpartiet)	6
Centre Party (Senterpartiet)	3
Socialist Left Party (Sosialistisk Venstreparti)	2
Optimum (Optimum)	2
Total number of members:	13

Namsskogan kommunestyre 2011–2015
Party name (in Norwegian)	Number of representatives
Labour Party (Arbeiderpartiet)	5
Progress Party (Fremskrittspartiet)	1
Centre Party (Senterpartiet)	1
Socialist Left Party (Sosialistisk Venstreparti)	3
Optimum (Optimum)	3
Total number of members:	13

Namsskogan kommunestyre 2007–2011
Party name (in Norwegian)	Number of representatives
Labour Party (Arbeiderpartiet)	5
Centre Party (Senterpartiet)	2
Socialist Left Party (Sosialistisk Venstreparti)	4
Optimum (Optimum)	2
Total number of members:	13

Namsskogan kommunestyre 2003–2007
Party name (in Norwegian)	Number of representatives
Labour Party (Arbeiderpartiet)	6
Centre Party (Senterpartiet)	2
Socialist Left Party (Sosialistisk Venstreparti)	3
Optimum (Optimum)	2
Total number of members:	13

Namsskogan kommunestyre 1999–2003
Party name (in Norwegian)	Number of representatives
Labour Party (Arbeiderpartiet)	7
Socialist Left Party (Sosialistisk Venstreparti)	3
Optimum (Optimum)	7
Total number of members:	17

Namsskogan kommunestyre 1995–1999
Party name (in Norwegian)	Number of representatives
Labour Party (Arbeiderpartiet)	5
Centre Party (Senterpartiet)	4
Socialist Left Party (Sosialistisk Venstreparti)	5
Free voters (Frie velgere)	3
Total number of members:	17

Namsskogan kommunestyre 1991–1995
Party name (in Norwegian)	Number of representatives
Labour Party (Arbeiderpartiet)	6
Centre Party (Senterpartiet)	3
Socialist Left Party (Sosialistisk Venstreparti)	5
Free Voters (Frie Velgere)	3
Total number of members:	17

Namsskogan kommunestyre 1987–1991
Party name (in Norwegian)	Number of representatives
Labour Party (Arbeiderpartiet)	11
Liberal Party (Venstre)	1
Joint list of the Conservative Party, Christian Democratic Party, Centre Party, and Free voters (Fellesliste for Høyre, Kristelig Folkeparti, Senterpartiet og Frie Velgere)	5
Total number of members:	17

Namsskogan kommunestyre 1983–1987
Party name (in Norwegian)	Number of representatives
Labour Party (Arbeiderpartiet)	10
Centre Party (Senterpartiet)	1
Joint list of free voters, Christian Democratic Party, Conservative Party (Frie velgere/Kristelig Folkeparti/Høyre)	6
Total number of members:	17

Namsskogan kommunestyre 1979–1983
Party name (in Norwegian)	Number of representatives
Labour Party (Arbeiderpartiet)	5
Centre Party (Senterpartiet)	2
Joint list of free voters, Christian Democratic Party, Conservative Party (Frie velgere/Kristelig Folkeparti/Høyre)	5
Local list from Brekkvasselv, Lonet and Furuby (Kretsliste utgått fra Brekkvasselv, Lonet og Furuby)	5
Total number of members:	17

Namsskogan kommunestyre 1975–1979
Party name (in Norwegian)	Number of representatives
Labour Party (Arbeiderpartiet)	10
Collaborative list for independent voters (Samarbeidsliste for Uavhengige Velgere)	7
Total number of members:	17

Namsskogan kommunestyre 1971–1975
Party name (in Norwegian)	Number of representatives
Labour Party (Arbeiderpartiet)	10
Centre Party (Senterpartiet)	3
Liberal Party (Venstre)	1
Local List(s) (Lokale lister)	3
Total number of members:	17

Namsskogan kommunestyre 1967–1971
Party name (in Norwegian)	Number of representatives
Labour Party (Arbeiderpartiet)	8
Christian Democratic Party (Kristelig Folkeparti)	1
Centre Party (Senterpartiet)	1
Socialist People's Party (Sosialistisk Folkeparti)	1
Liberal Party (Venstre)	1
Local List(s) (Lokale lister)	5
Total number of members:	17

Namsskogan kommunestyre 1963–1967
Party name (in Norwegian)	Number of representatives
Labour Party (Arbeiderpartiet)	12
Christian Democratic Party (Kristelig Folkeparti)	1
Centre Party (Senterpartiet)	2
Liberal Party (Venstre)	2
Total number of members:	17

Namsskogan herredsstyre 1959–1963
Party name (in Norwegian)	Number of representatives
Labour Party (Arbeiderpartiet)	12
Local List(s) (Lokale lister)	5
Total number of members:	17

Namsskogan herredsstyre 1955–1959
Party name (in Norwegian)	Number of representatives
Labour Party (Arbeiderpartiet)	8
Local List(s) (Lokale lister)	5
Total number of members:	13

Namsskogan herredsstyre 1951–1955
Party name (in Norwegian)	Number of representatives
Labour Party (Arbeiderpartiet)	5
Local List(s) (Lokale lister)	7
Total number of members:	12

Namsskogan herredsstyre 1947–1951
Party name (in Norwegian)	Number of representatives
Labour Party (Arbeiderpartiet)	5
Local List(s) (Lokale lister)	7
Total number of members:	12

Namsskogan herredsstyre 1945–1947
Party name (in Norwegian)	Number of representatives
Labour Party (Arbeiderpartiet)	8
Local List(s) (Lokale lister)	4
Total number of members:	12

Namsskogan herredsstyre 1937–1941*
Party name (in Norwegian)	Number of representatives
Labour Party (Arbeiderpartiet)	9
Local List(s) (Lokale lister)	3
Total number of members:	12
Note: Due to the German occupation of Norway during World War II, no elections were held for new municipal councils until after the war ended in 1945.

=== Politics ===
In the 2007 municipal elections, Namsskogan Municipality had the highest vote for the Socialist Left party in Norway, at 33.6 per cent.

=== Mayors ===
The mayor (Norwegian: ordfører) of Namsskogan Municipality is the political leader of the municipality and the chairperson of the municipal council. Here is a list of people who have held this position:

- 1923–1928: Kristian Trones (LL)
- 1929–1934: Arne Østgaard (V)
- 1935–1938: Ole Lindsetmo (V)
- 1939–1942: Alf Viken (Ap)
- 1942–1945: Ole Myrvold (NS)
- 1945–1947: Alf Viken (Ap)
- 1948–1951: Karl Myrvold (Ap)
- 1952–1955: Agnar Lindsetmo (V)
- 1956–1965: Reidar C. Hansen (Ap)
- 1965–1971: Alv Westin (Ap)
- 1972–1981: Hans Dahle (Ap)
- 1982–1983: Arnodd Grøttum (LL)
- 1984–1991: Sturla Sørgaard (Ap)
- 1992–1995: Inge Ryan (SV)
- 1995–1999: Kåre Vik (Sp)
- 1999–2003: Arnt Torseth (Ap)
- 2003–2007: Knut Berger (Ap)
- 2007–2011: Kari Ystgård (SV)
- 2011–2023: Stian Brekkvassmo (Ap)
- 2023–present: Elisabeth Vollmo Bjørhusdal (LL)

== Notable people ==
- Lene Cecilia Sparrok (born 1997), a Norwegian-Southern Sámi actress
