= Sisovatnet =

Lake in Sørfold, Norway

Sisovatnet (Norwegian) Sijdasjávrre (Lule Sami)
- Interactive map of the lake
- Location: Sørfold Municipality, Nordland
- Coordinates: 67.3367°N 15.8587°E
- Basin countries: Norway
- Max. length: 6 kilometres (3.7 mi)
- Max. width: 5 kilometres (3.1 mi)
- Surface area: 12.78 km^{2} (4.93 sq mi)
- Shore length^{1}: 22.04 kilometres (13.70 mi)
- Surface elevation: 672 metres (2,205 ft)
- References: NVE
- ^{1} Shore length is not a well-defined measure.

Sisovatnet (Norwegian) or Sijdasjávrre (Lule Sami) is a lake that lies in Sørfold Municipality in Nordland county, Norway. It is located in the southeastern part of the municipality of Sørfold, about 10 kilometres (6.2 mi) east of the village of Straumen. The lake Rundvatnet lies immediately east of Sisovatnet.

The lake is fed by the melting snow from the large Blåmannsisen glacier to the southeast. Water naturally flows out of Sisovatnet to the lake Andkjelvatnet, although much of the water is diverted to the lake Straumvatnet to be used for hydroelectric power.

== See also ==
- List of lakes in Norway
- Geography of Norway
