= Kvitvatnet =

Lake in Sørfold, Norway

- Interactive map of the lake
- Location: Sørfold Municipality, Nordland
- Coordinates: 67.3296°N 16.1066°E
- Basin countries: Norway
- Max. length: 3.6 kilometres (2.2 mi)
- Max. width: 2 kilometres (1.2 mi)
- Surface area: 3.08 km^{2} (1.19 sq mi)
- Shore length^{1}: 13.79 kilometres (8.57 mi)
- Surface elevation: 944 metres (3,097 ft)
- References: NVE
- ^{1} Shore length is not a well-defined measure.

Kvitvatnet is a lake that lies in Sørfold Municipality in Nordland county, Norway. It is located in the southeastern part of the municipality, about 21 kilometres (13 mi) east of the village of Straumen. The lake lies on the north side of the Blåmannsisen glacier, just south of the Rago National Park, and just west of the border with Sweden.

== See also ==
- List of lakes in Norway
- Geography of Norway
