= Nedre Veikvatnet =

Lake in Nordland, Norway

Nedre Veikvatnet (Norwegian) Vuolep Viejekjávrre (Lule Sami)
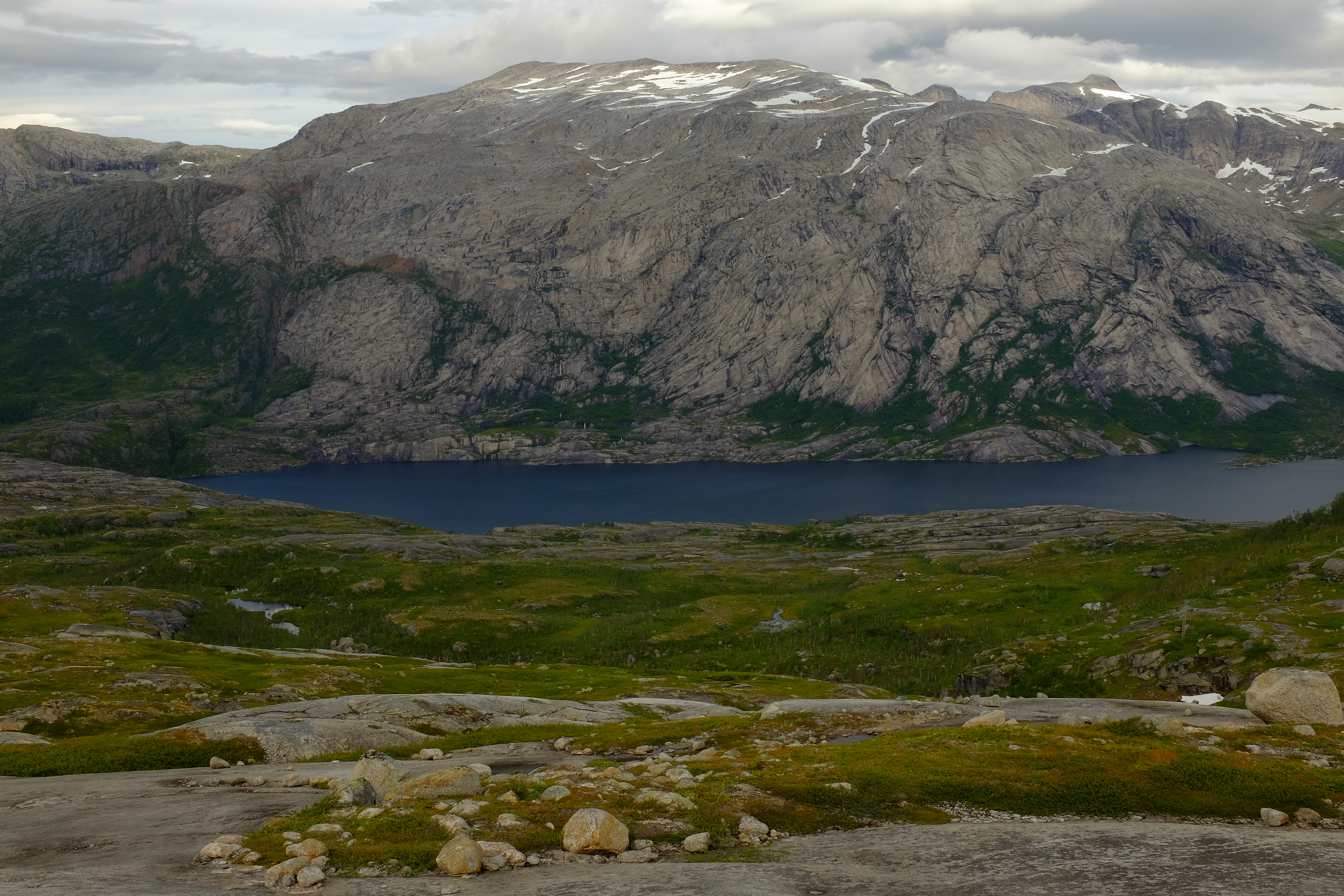
- Interactive map of the lake
- Location: Sørfold Municipality, Nordland
- Coordinates: 67.5968°N 16.0964°E
- Basin countries: Norway
- Max. length: 3.3 kilometres (2.1 mi)
- Max. width: 1 kilometre (0.62 mi)
- Surface area: 2.27 km^{2} (0.88 sq mi)
- Shore length^{1}: 8.69 kilometres (5.40 mi)
- Surface elevation: 196 metres (643 ft)
- References: NVE
- ^{1} Shore length is not a well-defined measure.

Nedre Veikvatnet (Norwegian) or Vuolep Viejekjávrre (Lule Sami) is a lake that lies in Sørfold Municipality in Nordland county, Norway. The 2.27-square-kilometre (0.88 sq mi) lake lies about 15 kilometres (9.3 mi) southeast of the village of Mørsvikbotn. Nedre Veikvatnet has an inlet from the nearby lake Øvre Veikvatnet, and an outlet that connects to another nearby lake Kobbvatnet.

== See also ==
- List of lakes in Norway
- Geography of Norway
