= Langvatnet =

Langvatnet (English: "Long Lake") is the name of several lakes in Norway.

- Langvatnet (Ballangen), a lake in Ballangen municipality, Nordland county
- Langvatnet (Fauske), a lake in Fauske municipality, Nordland county
- Langvatnet (Gildeskål), a lake in Gildeskål municipality, Nordland county
- Langvatnet (Rana), a lake in Rana municipality, Nordland county
- Langvatnet (Skjåk), a lake in Skjåk municipality, Oppland county
- Langvatnet (Sørfold), a lake in Sørfold municipality, Nordland county
- Langvatnet (Sør-Varanger), a lake in Sør-Varanger municipality, Finnmark county
- Langvatnet (Sunndal), a lake in Sunndal municipality, Møre og Romsdal county
- Langvatnet (Tysfjord), a lake in Tysfjord municipality, Nordland county

== See also ==
- Langavatnet
