= Andkjelvatnet =

Lake in Nordland, Norway

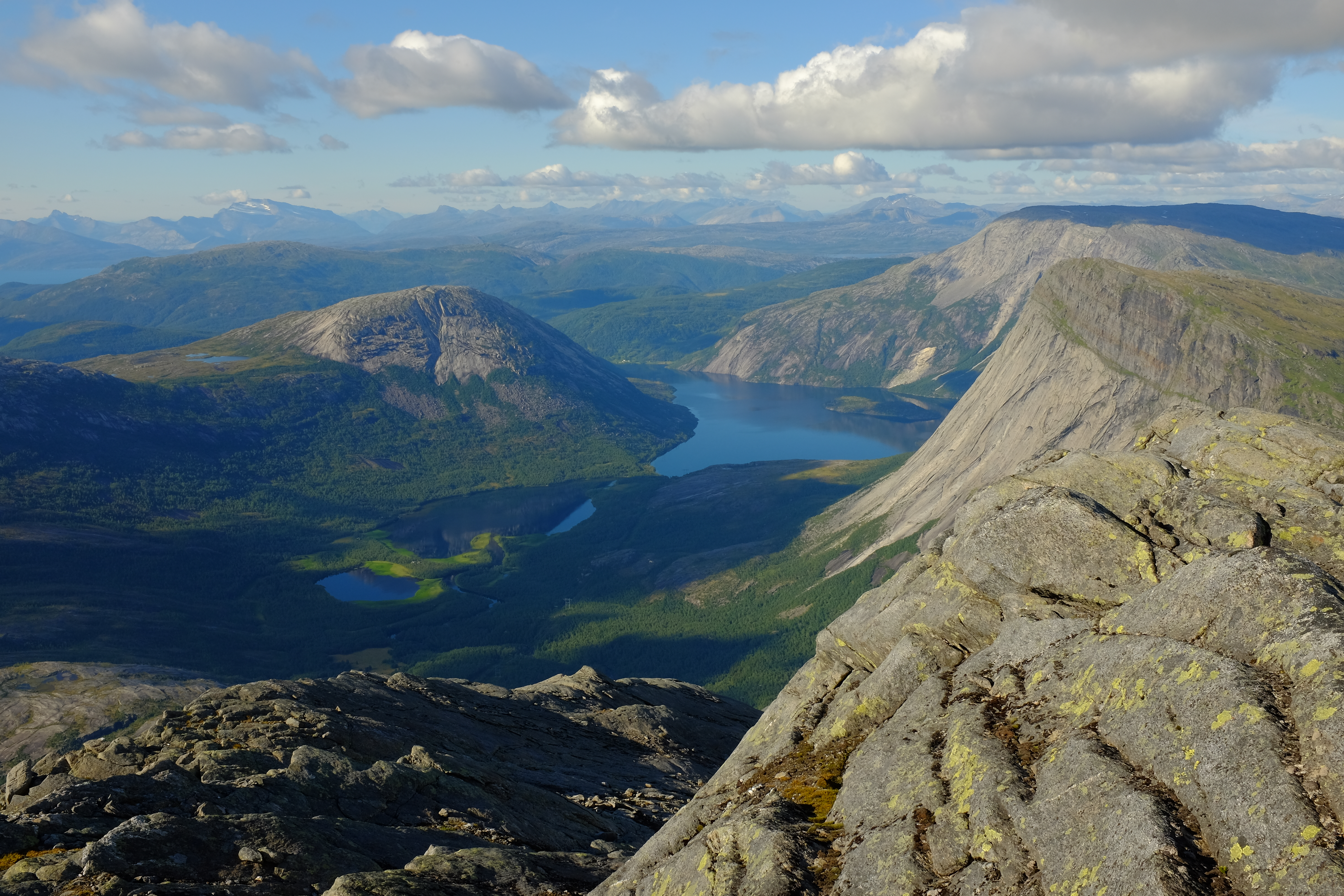
- Andkjelvatnet seen from Durmålstinden summit
- Interactive map of the lake
- Location: Sørfold Municipality, Nordland
- Coordinates: 67.3820°N 15.7363°E
- Basin countries: Norway
- Max. length: 5 kilometres (3.1 mi)
- Max. width: 1.8 kilometres (1.1 mi)
- Surface area: 5.07 km^{2} (1.96 sq mi)
- Shore length^{1}: 17 kilometres (11 mi)
- Surface elevation: 9 metres (30 ft)
- References: NVE
- ^{1} Shore length is not a well-defined measure.

Andkjelvatnet is a lake that lies in Sørfold Municipality in Nordland county, Norway. It is located in the southeastern part of the municipality of Sørfold, about 6 kilometres (3.7 mi) northeast of the village of Straumen. The water flows out through the Tørrfjordelva river into the Sørfolda fjord. Most of the water that would naturally flow into the lake from the lake Sisovatnet to the east is diverted to a hydroelectric power station on the lake Straumvatnet.

== See also ==
- List of lakes in Norway
- Geography of Norway
