= Faulvatnet =

Lake in Nordland, Norway

Faulvatnet (Norwegian) Låddejávrre (Lule Sami)
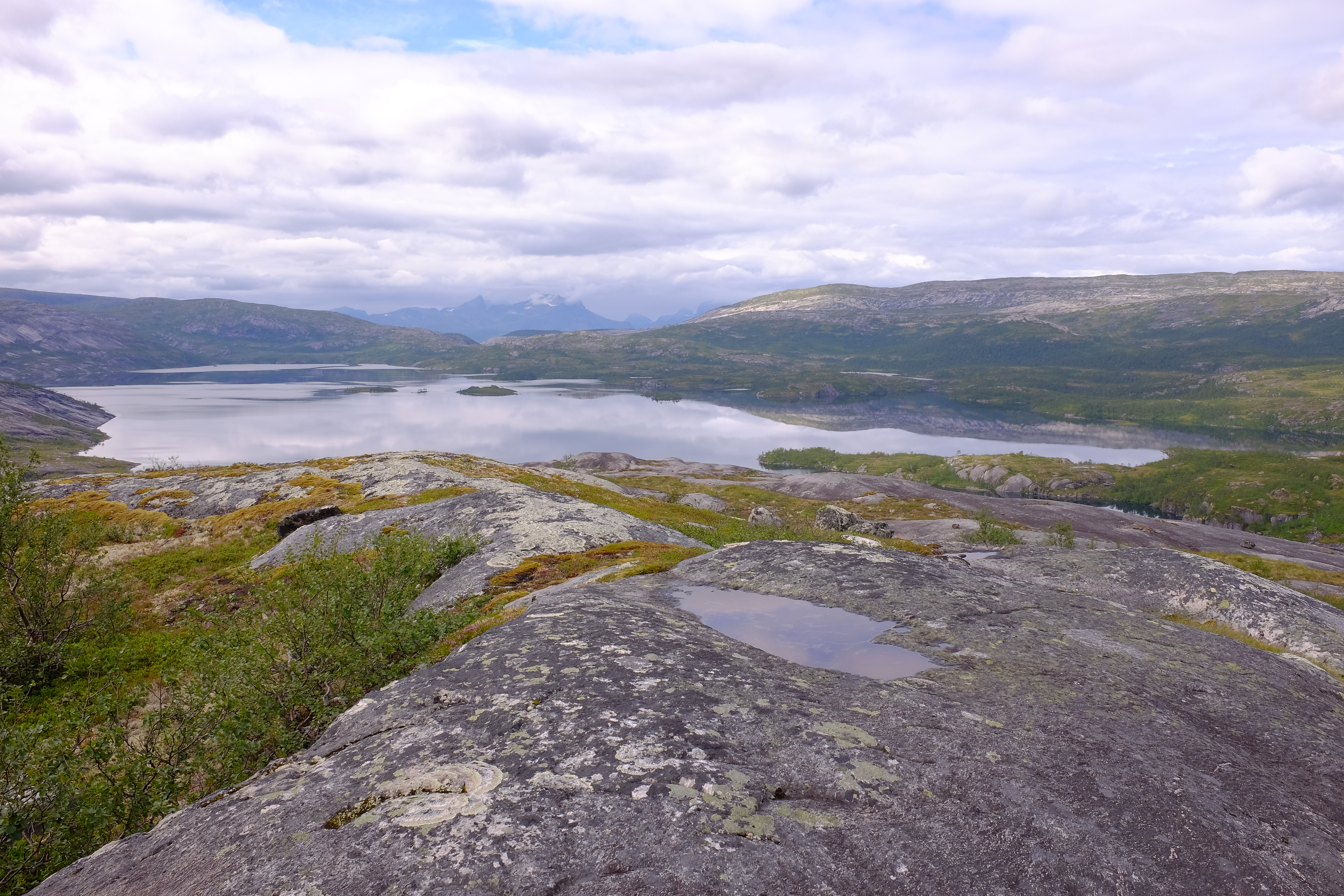
- Faulvatnet lake, viewed from the north-east
- Interactive map of the lake
- Location: Sørfold Municipality, Nordland
- Coordinates: 67.4742°N 15.7443°E
- Basin countries: Norway
- Max. length: 5.7 kilometres (3.5 mi)
- Max. width: 2.5 kilometres (1.6 mi)
- Surface area: 7.24 km^{2} (2.80 sq mi)
- Shore length^{1}: 25.5 kilometres (15.8 mi)
- Surface elevation: 317 metres (1,040 ft)
- References: NVE
- ^{1} Shore length is not a well-defined measure.

Faulvatnet (Norwegian) or Låddejávrre (Lule Sami) is a lake that lies in Sørfold Municipality in Nordland county, Norway. The 7.24-square-kilometre (2.80 sq mi) lake is located about 15 kilometres (9.3 mi) north of the village of Straumen, just west of Rago National Park. The water flows out into the Sleipdalselva river and the water is used for power generation at the Lakshola hydroelectric power station.

== See also ==
- List of lakes in Norway
- Geography of Norway
