= Litlverivatnet =

Lake in Sørfold, Norway

Litlverivatnet (Norwegian) Bassejávrre (Lule Sami)
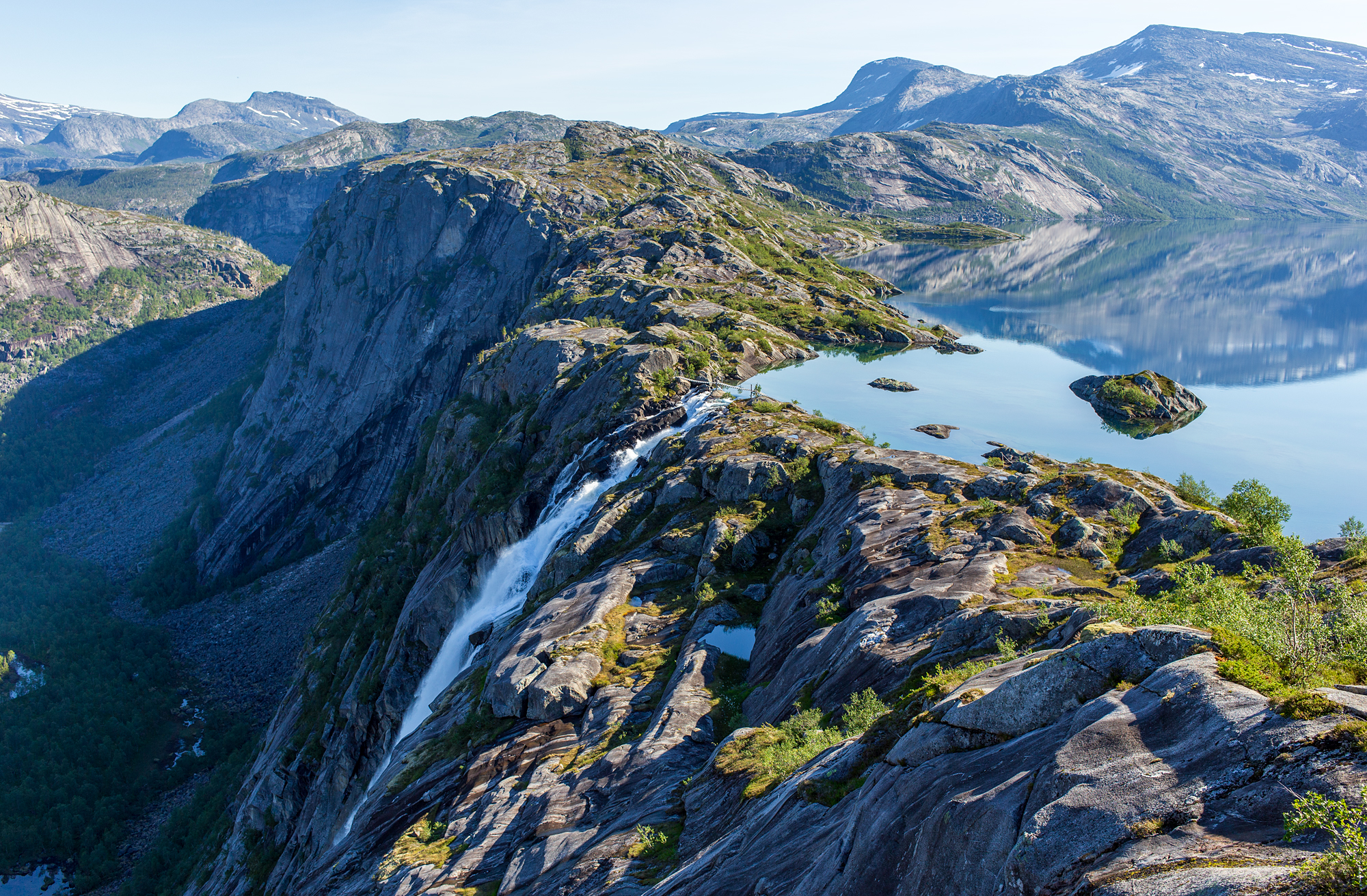
- Interactive map of the lake
- Location: Sørfold Municipality, Nordland
- Coordinates: 67.4273°N 15.8943°E
- Basin countries: Norway
- Max. length: 5 kilometres (3.1 mi)
- Max. width: 1.5 kilometres (0.93 mi)
- Surface area: 3.98 km^{2} (1.54 sq mi)
- Shore length^{1}: 11.61 kilometres (7.21 mi)
- Surface elevation: 311 metres (1,020 ft)
- References: NVE
- ^{1} Shore length is not a well-defined measure.

Litlverivatnet (Norwegian) or Bassejávrre (Lule Sami) is a lake that lies in Sørfold Municipality in Nordland county, Norway. The 3.98-square-kilometre (1.54 sq mi) lake is located about 15 kilometres (9.3 mi) northeast of the village of Straumen, inside of Rago National Park.

== See also ==
- List of lakes in Norway
- Geography of Norway
