= Grovatnet =

Lake in Sørfold, Norway

- Interactive map of the lake
- Location: Sørfold Municipality, Nordland
- Coordinates: 67.6162°N 15.5042°E
- Basin countries: Norway
- Max. length: 4 kilometres (2.5 mi)
- Max. width: 1 kilometre (0.62 mi)
- Surface area: 2.64 km^{2} (1.02 sq mi)
- Shore length^{1}: 12.7 kilometres (7.9 mi)
- Surface elevation: 99 metres (325 ft)
- References: NVE
- ^{1} Shore length is not a well-defined measure.

Grovatnet is a lake that lies in Sørfold Municipality in Nordland county, Norway. The 2.64-square-kilometre (1.02 sq mi) lake is located northeast of the Sagfjorden, about 15 kilometres (9.3 mi) southwest of the village of Mørsvikbotn.

== See also ==
- List of lakes in Norway
- Geography of Norway
