= Storskogvatnet =

Lake in Sørfold, Norway

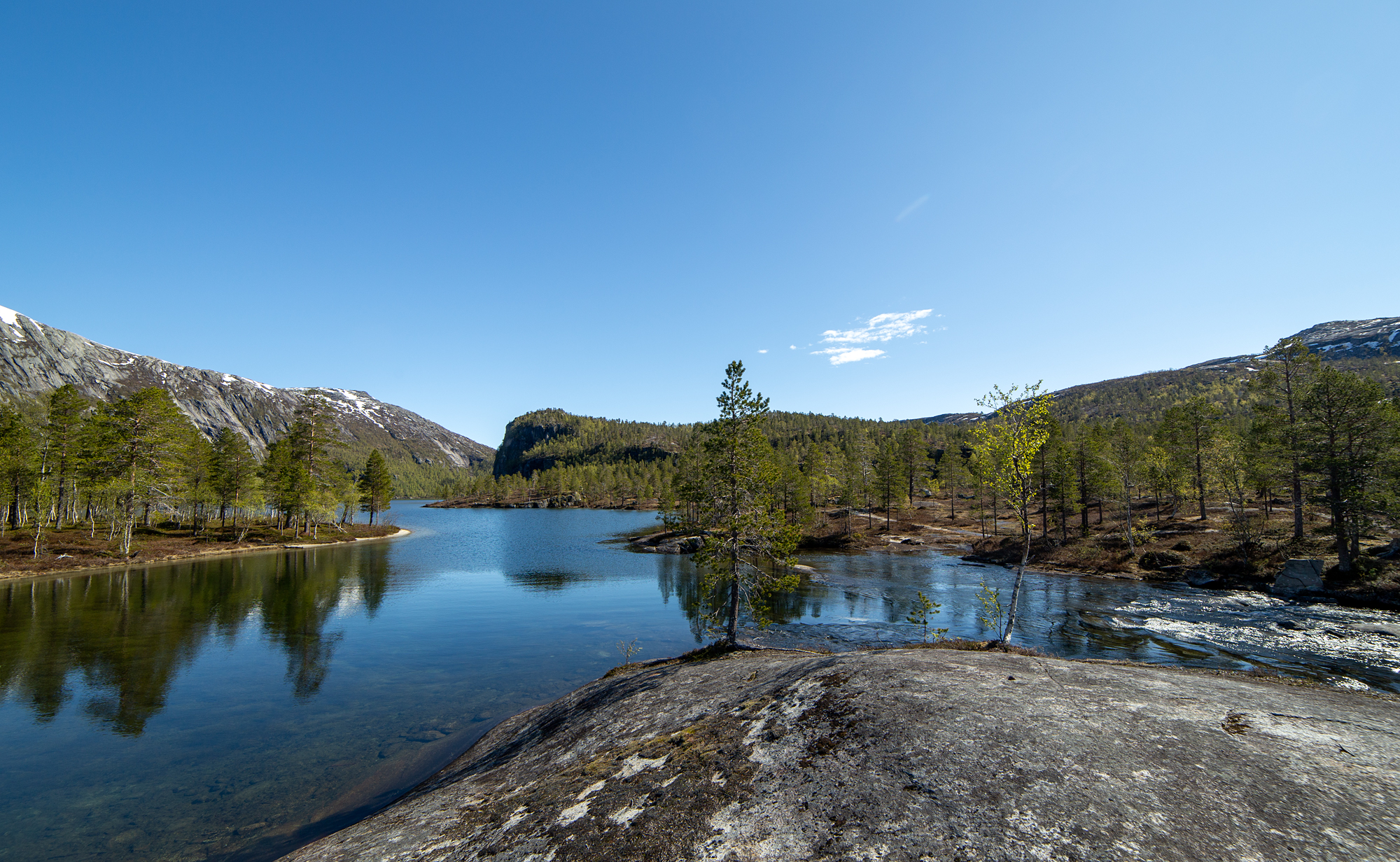
- Interactive map of the lake
- Location: Sørfold Municipality, Nordland
- Coordinates: 67.4673°N 15.9642°E
- Basin countries: Norway
- Max. length: 4.5 kilometres (2.8 mi)
- Max. width: 1.5 kilometres (0.93 mi)
- Surface area: 2.39 km^{2} (0.92 sq mi)
- Shore length^{1}: 13.04 kilometres (8.10 mi)
- Surface elevation: 193 metres (633 ft)
- References: NVE
- ^{1} Shore length is not a well-defined measure.

Storskogvatnet is a lake that lies in Sørfold Municipality in Nordland county, Norway. The 2.39-square-kilometre (0.92 sq mi) lake is located about 20 kilometres (12 mi) northeast of the village of Straumen, inside of Rago National Park.

== See also ==
- List of lakes in Norway
- Geography of Norway
