= Røyrvatnet =

Lake in Sørfold, Norway

Røyrvatnet (Norwegian) Rávddojávrre (Lule Sami)
- Interactive map of the lake
- Location: Sørfold Municipality, Nordland
- Coordinates: 67.3028°N 15.6376°E
- Basin countries: Norway
- Max. length: 3.4 kilometres (2.1 mi)
- Max. width: 2 kilometres (1.2 mi)
- Surface area: 4.03 km^{2} (1.56 sq mi)
- Shore length^{1}: 10.9 kilometres (6.8 mi)
- Surface elevation: 117 metres (384 ft)
- References: NVE
- ^{1} Shore length is not a well-defined measure.

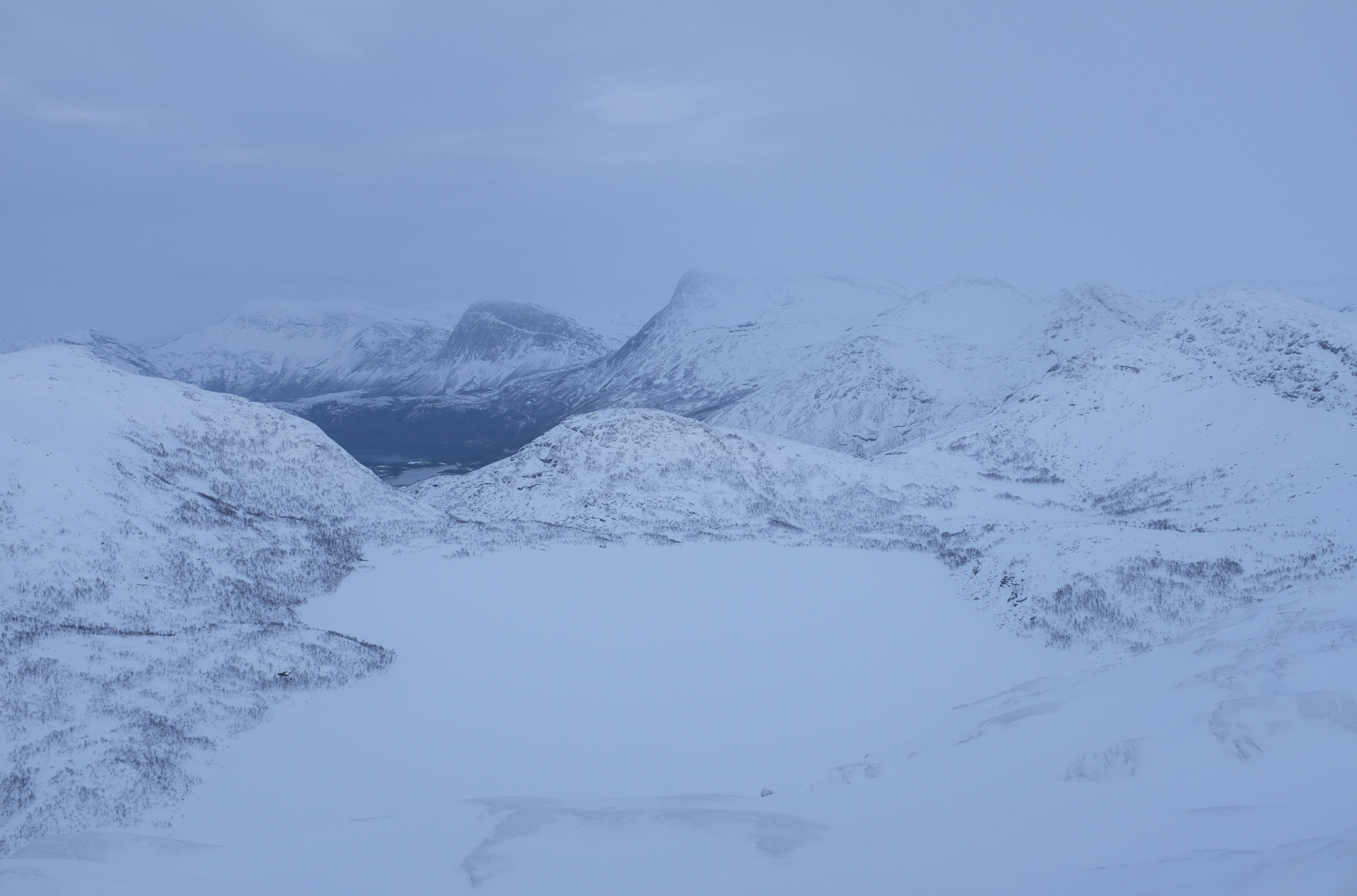
Light shines in the Polar Night. Flurries of snow above the tree lakes Nevervatnet, Røyrvatnet and Straumvatnet. Fauske and Sørfold, Nordland, Norway.

Røyrvatnet (Norwegian) or Rávddojávrre (Lule Sami) is a lake that lies in Sørfold Municipality in Nordland county, Norway. It is located about 4 kilometres (2.5 mi) south of the village of Straumen. Its water flows out into the lake Straumvatnet; about 750 metres (2,460 ft) to the north.

== See also ==
- List of lakes in Norway
- Geography of Norway
