= Sagfjorden =

Sagfjorden may refer to the following places in Norway:

- Sagfjorden (Nordland), a fjord
  - Sagfjorden (village), a village in Nordland
- Sagfjorden (Sørfold), a fjord inear Trollvatnet
