= Langvatnet (Sørfold) =

Lake in Sørfold, Norway

Langvatnet (Norwegian) Guhkesjávrre (Lule Sami)
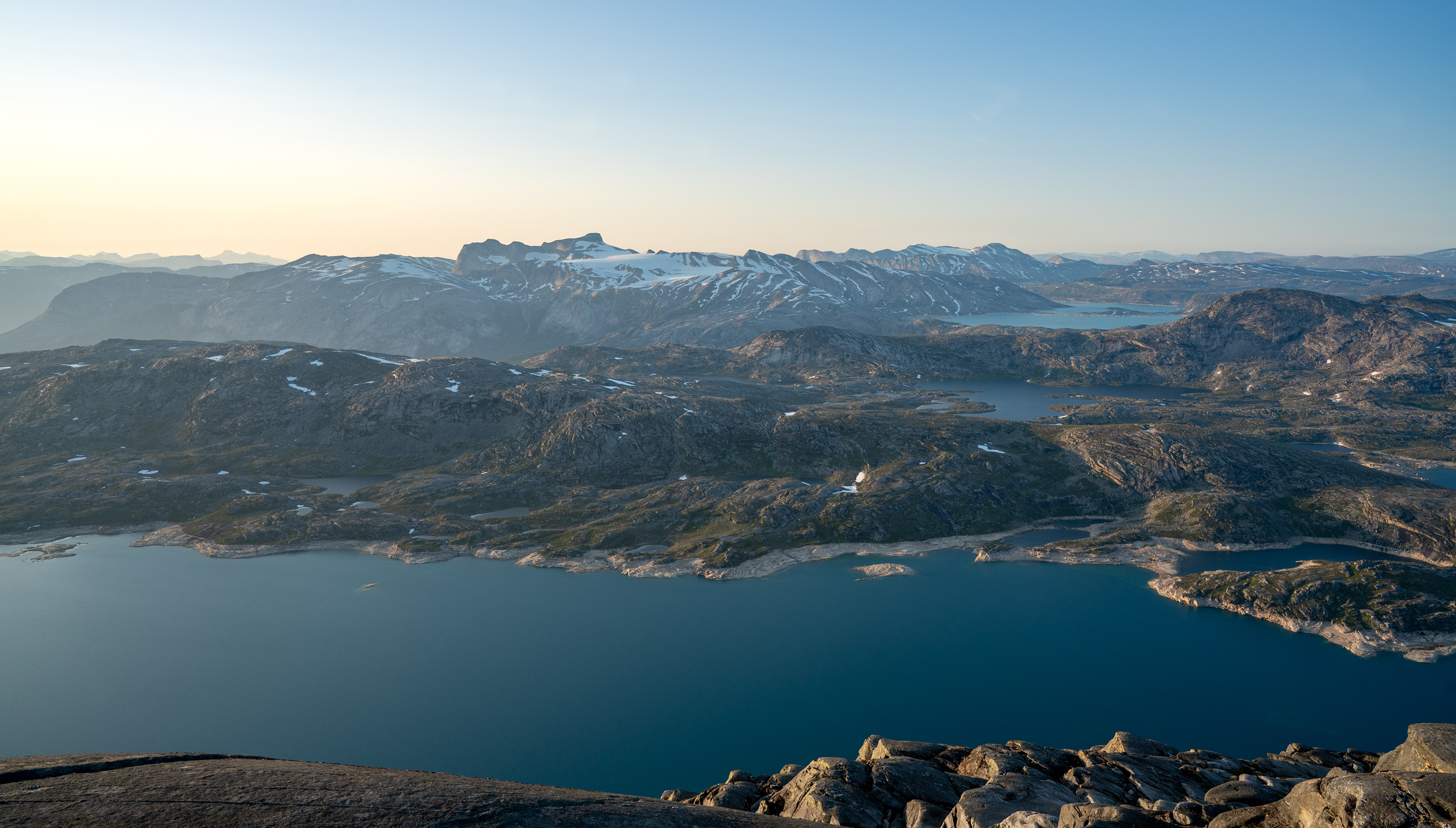
- Interactive map of the lake
- Location: Sørfold Municipality, Nordland
- Coordinates: 67.5331°N 16.1276°E
- Basin countries: Norway
- Max. length: 10 kilometres (6.2 mi)
- Max. width: 2.5 kilometres (1.6 mi)
- Surface area: 13.97 km^{2} (5.39 sq mi)
- Shore length^{1}: 32.55 kilometres (20.23 mi)
- Surface elevation: 622 metres (2,041 ft)
- References: NVE
- ^{1} Shore length is not a well-defined measure.

Langvatnet (Norwegian) or Guhkesjávrre (Lule Sami) is a lake that lies in Sørfold Municipality in Nordland county, Norway. The 13.97-square-kilometre (5.39 sq mi) lake is located about 30 kilometres (19 mi) northeast of the village of Straumen, just north of Rago National Park and the border with Sweden.

== See also ==
- List of lakes in Norway
- Geography of Norway
