= Horndalsvatnet =

Lake in Sørfold, Norway

Horndalsvatnet (Norwegian) Tjoarvekjávrre (Lule Sami)
- Historic: Čoarvvekjávri (Lule Sami)
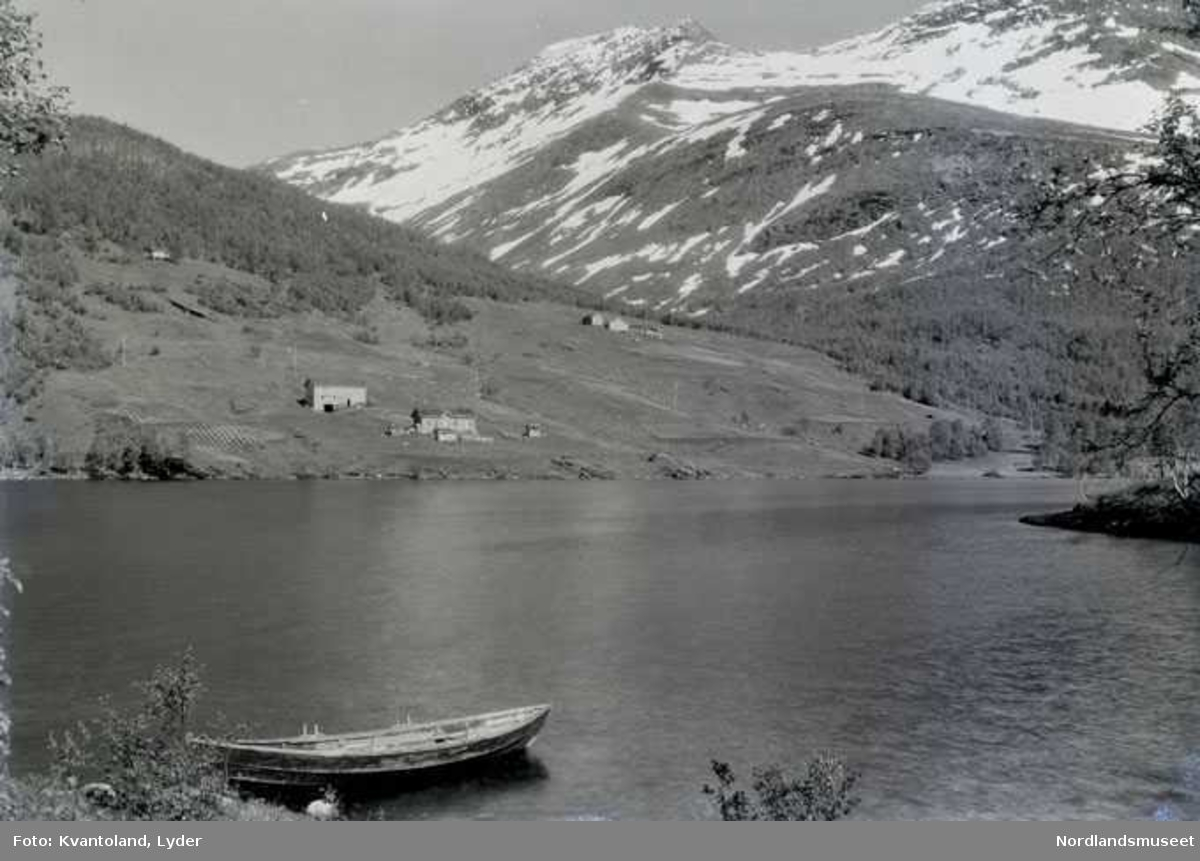
- Horndalsvatnet in 1934
- Interactive map of the lake
- Location: Sørfold Municipality, Nordland
- Coordinates: 67.6389°N 15.7028°E
- Basin countries: Norway
- Max. length: 2.8 kilometres (1.7 mi)
- Max. width: 2.7 kilometres (1.7 mi)
- Surface area: 3.5 km^{2} (1.4 sq mi)
- Shore length^{1}: 8.75 kilometres (5.44 mi)
- Surface elevation: 111 metres (364 ft)
- References: NVE
- ^{1} Shore length is not a well-defined measure.

Horndalsvatnet (Norwegian) or Tjoarvekjávrre (Lule Sami) is a lake located in Sørfold Municipality in Nordland county, Norway. The 3.5-square-kilometre (1.4 sq mi) lake lies about 7 kilometres (4.3 mi) southwest of the village of Mørsvikbotn.

== See also ==
- List of lakes in Norway
- Geography of Norway
