= Rundvatnet =

Lake in Nordland, Norway

- Interactive map of the lake
- Location: Sørfold Municipality, Nordland
- Coordinates: 67.3239°N 15.9800°E
- Basin countries: Norway
- Max. length: 2.2 kilometres (1.4 mi)
- Max. width: 1.7 kilometres (1.1 mi)
- Surface area: 2.27 km^{2} (0.88 sq mi)
- Shore length^{1}: 6.68 kilometres (4.15 mi)
- Surface elevation: 672 metres (2,205 ft)
- References: NVE
- ^{1} Shore length is not a well-defined measure.

Rundvatnet is a lake that lies in Sørfold Municipality in Nordland county, Norway. It is located in the southeastern part of the municipality of Sørfold, about 15 kilometres (9.3 mi) east of the village of Straumen. The lake Sisovatnet lies immediately west of Rundvatnet; they are connected by the narrow Rundvasstraumen strait.

== See also ==
- List of lakes in Norway
- Geography of Norway
