= Leirvatnet (Sørfold) =

Lake on the Norway-Sweden border

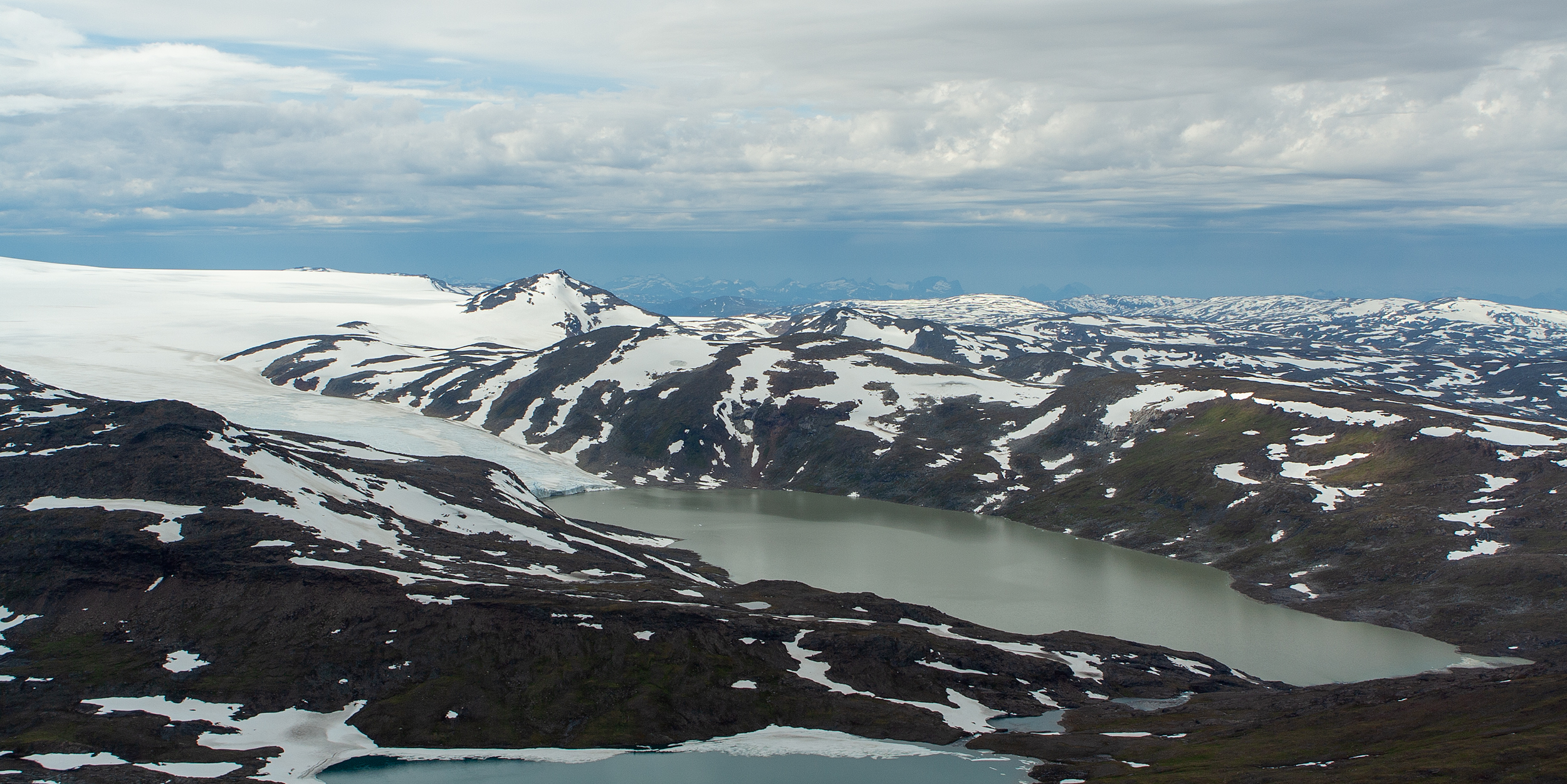
- Leirvatnet Lake
- Interactive map of the lake
- Location: Sørfold in Nordland and Jokkmokk in Norrbotten
- Coordinates: 67.2910°N 16.2476°E
- Basin countries: Norway and Sweden
- Max. length: 3 kilometres (1.9 mi)
- Max. width: 1 kilometre (0.62 mi)
- Surface area: 2.57 km^{2} (0.99 sq mi) (2.51 km² in Norway)
- Shore length^{1}: 7.72 kilometres (4.80 mi)
- Surface elevation: 826 metres (2,710 ft)
- References: NVE
- ^{1} Shore length is not a well-defined measure.

Leirvatnet is a lake located on the border between Norway and Sweden. The majority of the 2.57-square-kilometre (0.99 sq mi) lake lies in Sørfold Municipality in Nordland county, Norway, and the remaining 0.06 square kilometres (15 acres) of the lake are located in Jokkmokk Municipality in Norrbotten County, Sweden. The lake lies at one end of the large Blåmannsisen glacier.

== See also ==
- List of lakes in Norway
- Geography of Norway
