= Trollvatnet =

Lake in Sørfold, Norway

- Interactive map of the lake
- Location: Sørfold Municipality, Nordland
- Coordinates: 67.6326°N 15.3953°E
- Basin countries: Norway
- Max. length: 3.5 kilometres (2.2 mi)
- Max. width: 1.5 kilometres (0.93 mi)
- Surface area: 3.88 km^{2} (1.50 sq mi)
- Shore length^{1}: 9.15 kilometres (5.69 mi)
- Surface elevation: 157 metres (515 ft)
- References: NVE
- ^{1} Shore length is not a well-defined measure.

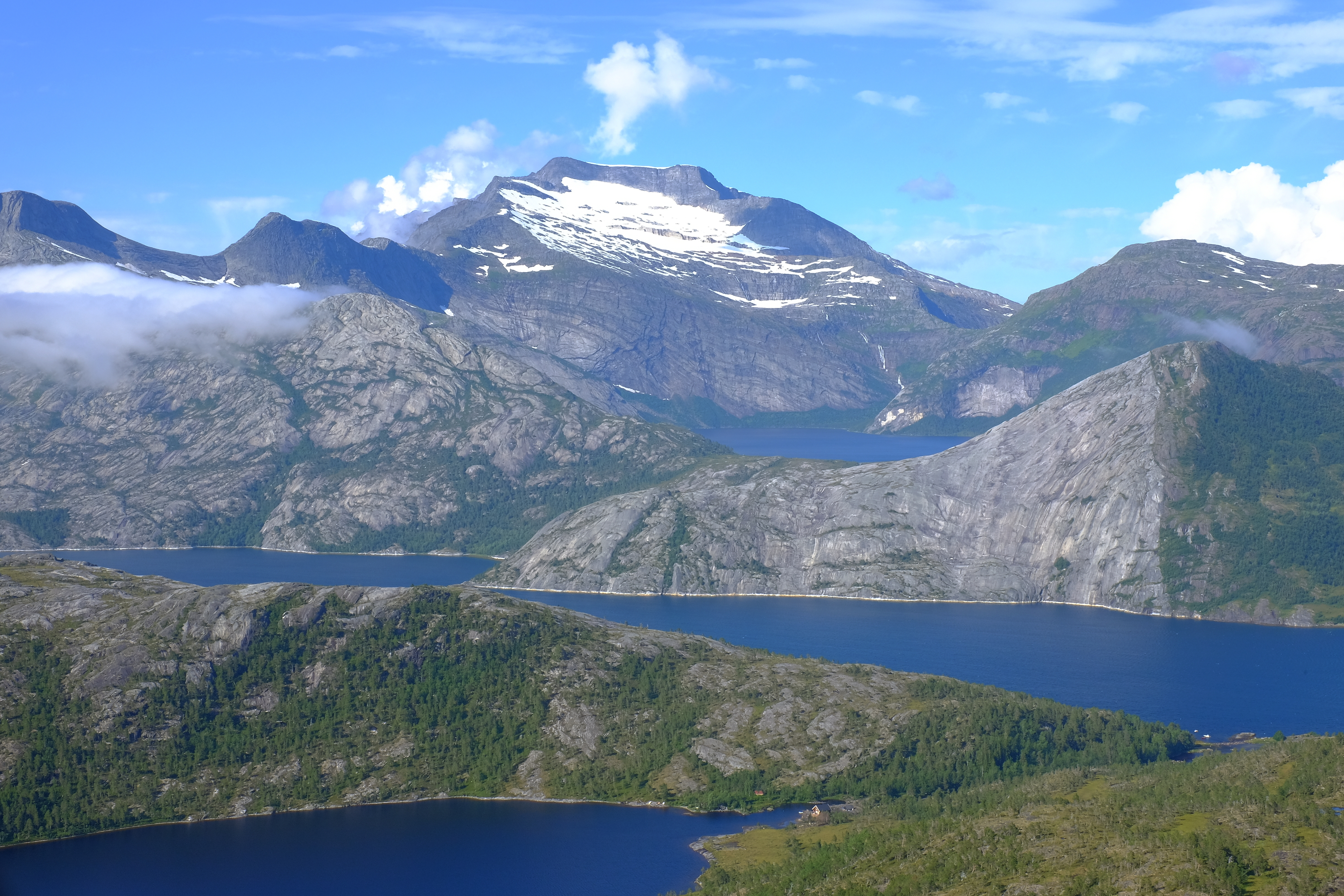

Trollvatnet is a lake that lies in Sørfold Municipality in Nordland county, Norway. The 3.88-square-kilometre (1.50 sq mi) lake is located northeast of the Sagfjorden, about 20 kilometres (12 mi) west of the village of Mørsvikbotn.

== See also ==
- List of lakes in Norway
- Geography of Norway
