= Langavatnet =

Langavatnet (English: "Long Lake") is the name of several lakes in Norway.

- Langavatnet (Aurland), a lake in Aurland municipality, Vestland county
- Langavatnet (Eidfjord), a lake in Eidfjord municipality, Vestland county
- Langavatnet (Odda), a lake in Ullensvang municipality, Vestland county

== See also ==
- Langvatnet
