= Blåmannsisvatnet =

Lake in Nordland, Norway

Blåmannsisvatnet (Norwegian); Ålmåjalosjiegŋajávrre (Lule Sami)
- Interactive map of the lake
- Location: Fauske Municipality, Nordland
- Coordinates: 67.2267°N 16.1736°E
- Basin countries: Norway
- Max. length: 3.5 kilometres (2.2 mi)
- Max. width: 1.9 kilometres (1.2 mi)
- Surface area: 3.76 km^{2} (1.45 sq mi)
- Shore length^{1}: 9.95 kilometres (6.18 mi)
- Surface elevation: 935 metres (3,068 ft)
- References: NVE
- ^{1} Shore length is not a well-defined measure.

Blåmannsisvatnet (Norwegian) or Ålmåjalosjiegŋajávrre (Lule Sami) is a lake in Fauske Municipality in Nordland county, Norway. The 3.76-square-kilometre (1.45 sq mi) lake lies on the southeast edge of the large Blåmannsisen glacier, about 35 kilometres (22 mi) east of the town of Fauske. The border with Sweden is located about 6 kilometres (3.7 mi) east of the lake.

== See also ==
- List of lakes in Norway
- Geography of Norway
