= Sørfold Municipality =

Municipality in Nordland, Norway

Sørfold Municipality Sørfold kommune Fuoldá suohkan
- Municipality
- Sørfolden herred (historic name)
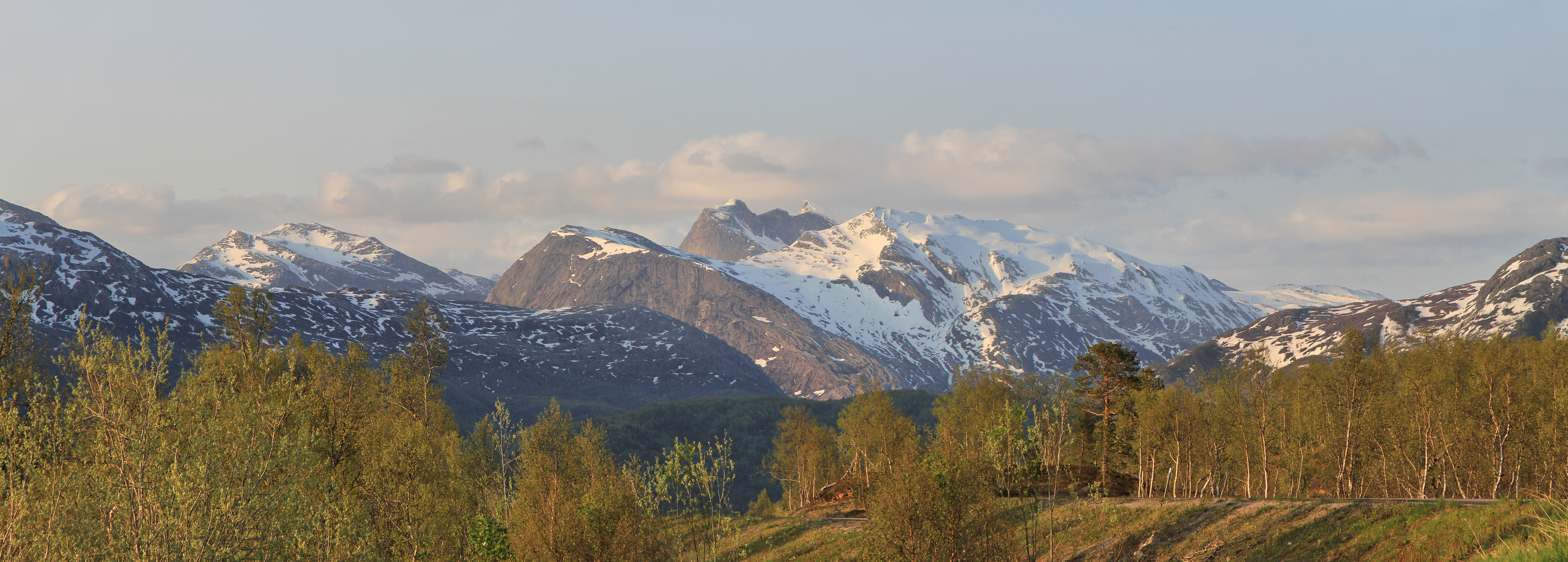
- View of Kviturfjellet and Veikdalsisen

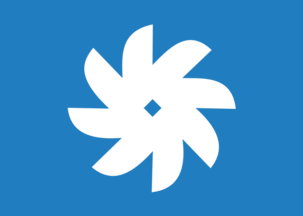
- Flag Coat of arms

- Nordland within Norway

- Sørfold within Nordland
- Coordinates: 67°13′14″N 15°48′31″E
- Country: Norway
- County: Nordland
- District: Salten
- Established: 1 Jan 1887
  - Preceded by: Folden Municipality
- Administrative centre: Straumen

Government
  - Mayor (2023): Kolbjørn Mathisen (Ap)

Area
  - Total: 1,637.41 km^{2} (632.21 sq mi)
  - Land: 1,471.26 km^{2} (568.06 sq mi)
  - Water: 166.15 km^{2} (64.15 sq mi) 10.1%
  - Rank: #48 in Norway
- Highest elevation: 1,663.6 m (5,458 ft)

Population (2024)
  - Total: 1,858
  - Rank: #290 in Norway
  - Density: 1.1/km^{2} (2.8/sq mi)
  - Change (10 years): ▼ −6.5%
- Demonym: Sørfoldværing

Official language
  - Norwegian form: Bokmål
- Time zone: UTC+01:00 (CET)
  - Summer (DST): UTC+02:00 (CEST)
- ISO 3166 code: NO-1845
- Website: Official website

Sørfold (Norwegian) or Fuolldá (Lule Sami) is a municipality in Nordland county, Norway. It is part of the traditional district of Salten. The administrative centre of the municipality is the village of Straumen. Other villages in the municipality include Leirfjordgården, Mørsvikbotn, Røsvika, Rørstad, Styrkesvik, and Øvre Kvarv. The municipality surrounds the Sørfolda fjord and stretches east to the border with Sweden.

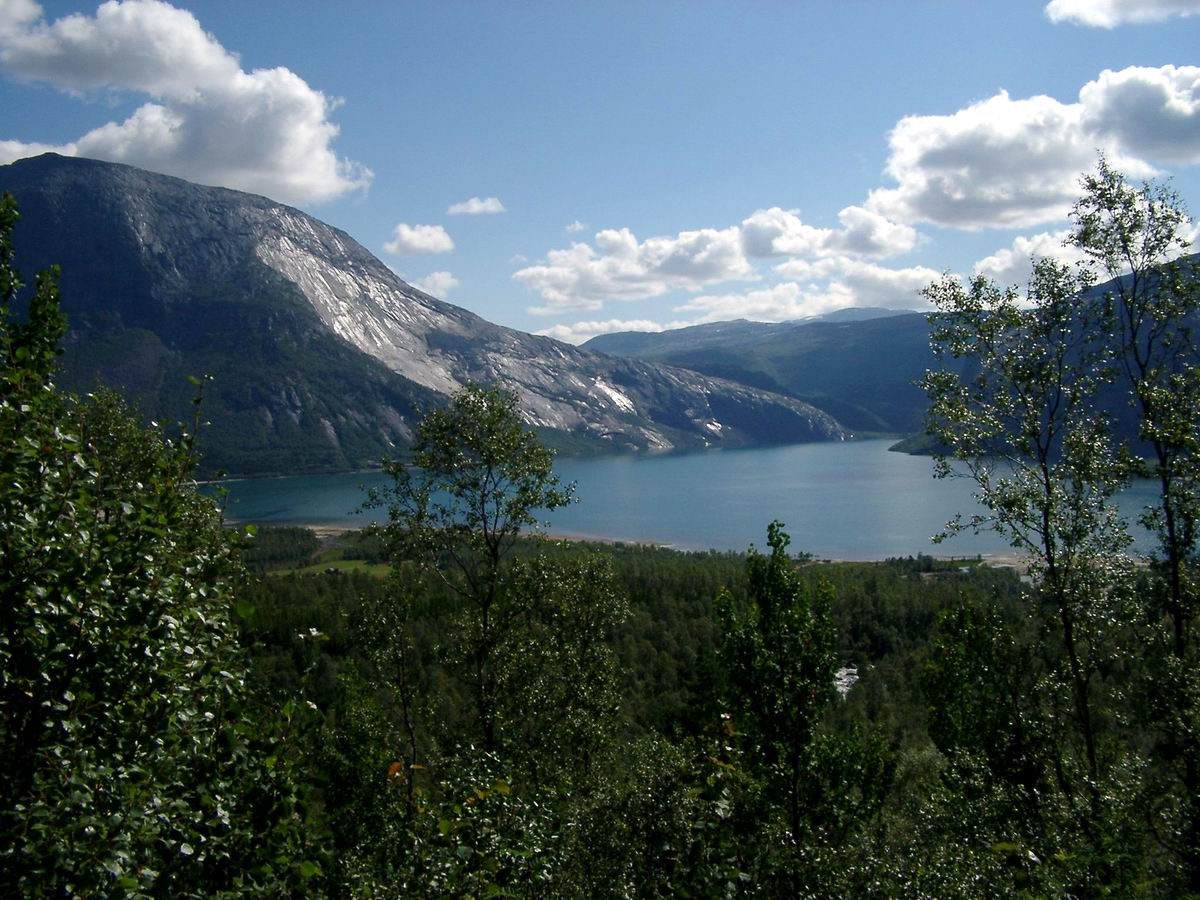
Kobbvatnet lake, Sørfold

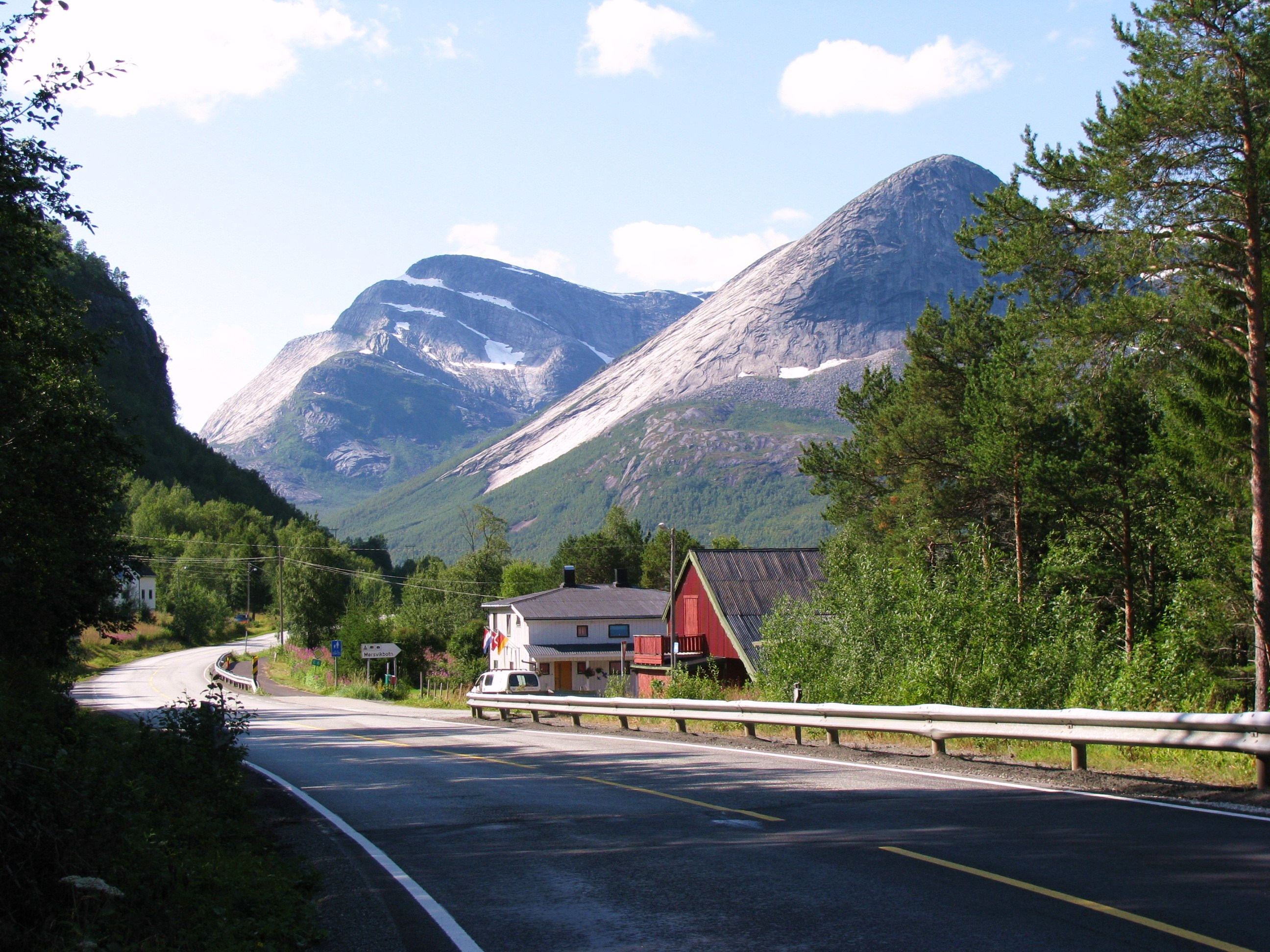
Mørsvikbotn village and E6 road

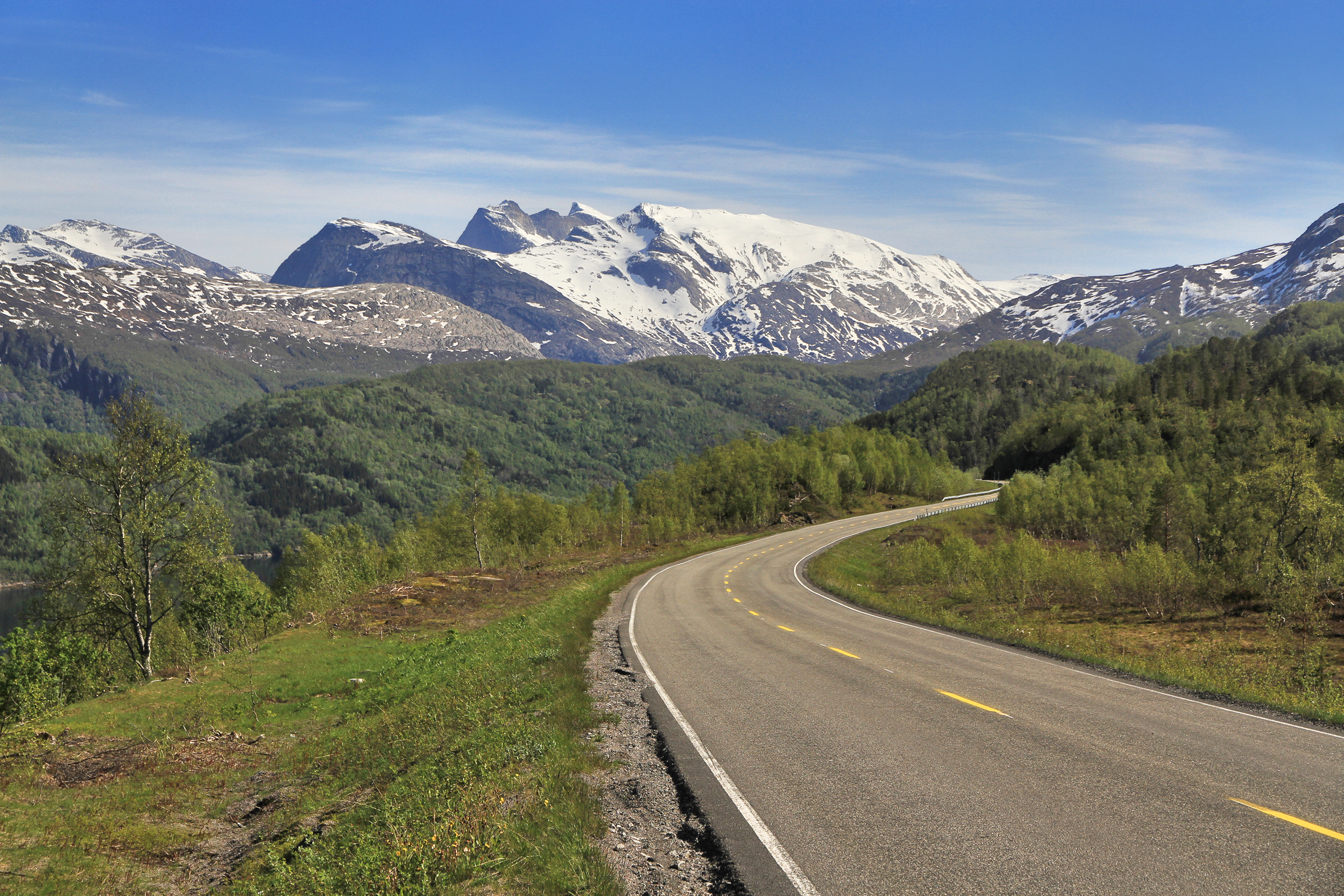
View from the E6 highway

The 1,637-square-kilometre (632 sq mi) municipality is the 48th largest by area out of the 357 municipalities in Norway. Sørfold is the 290th most populous municipality in Norway with a population of 1,858. The municipality's population density is 1.1 inhabitants per square kilometre (2.8/sq mi) and its population has decreased by 6.5% over the previous 10-year period.

== General information ==
The municipality of Sørfolden was established on 1 January 1887 when the old Folden Municipality was divided into two: Sørfolden Municipality (population: 1,946) and Nordfolden-Kjerringø Municipality (population: 1,347). The spelling was later changed to just Sørfold. On 1 January 1894, the Movik farm (population: 30) along the Sagfjorden was transferred from Nordfolden-Kjerringø Municipality to Sørfold Municipality.

During the 1960s, there were many municipal mergers across Norway due to the work of the Schei Committee. On 1 January 1964, the Øyjord area along the Nevelsfjorden (population: 81) was transferred to the neighboring Bodin Municipality. On the same date, the Mørsvikbotn area (population: 268) was transferred from Nordfold Municipality to Sørfold Municipality. On 1 January 1984, the Tårnvika and Øygården area (population: 22) along the Sørfolda fjord was transferred from Sørfold Municipality to Bodø Municipality.

=== Name ===
The municipality (originally the parish) is named after the local Folda fjord (Old Norse: Fold). The first element is the prefix sør which means "southern". The last element is fold which has an unknown meaning (maybe "the broad one"). The inner part of the fjord is divided into two arms Nordfolda ("the northern Folda") and Sørfolda ("the southern Folda"). Historically, the name of the municipality was spelled Sørfolden. On 6 January 1908, a royal resolution changed the spelling of the name of the municipality to Sørfold.

On 16 February 2024, the national government approved a resolution to add a co-equal, official Sami language name for the municipality: Fuolldá. The spelling of the Sami language name changes depending on how it is used. It is called Fuolldá when it is spelled alone, but it is Fuoldá suohkan when using the Sami language equivalent to "Sørfold Municipality".

=== Coat of arms ===
The coat of arms was granted on 24 April 1987. The official blazon is "Azure, a turbine wheel argent" (Norwegian: I blått et sølv turbinhjul). This means the arms have a blue field (background) and the charge is a turbine wheel for a hydroelectric power plant. The turbine has a tincture of argent which means it is commonly colored white, but if it is made out of metal, then silver is used. The blue color in the field and the turbine were chosen to symbolize the rivers around the municipality which contain many rapids and waterfalls. These are partly harnessed to generate electricity which has provided a major source of income for the municipality. The arms were designed by Arvid Sveen from Vadsø.

=== Churches ===
The Church of Norway has one parish (sokn) within Sørfold Municipality. It is part of the Salten prosti (deanery) in the Diocese of Sør-Hålogaland.

Churches in Sørfold Municipality
| Parish (sokn) | Church name | Location of the church | Year built |
|---|---|---|---|
| Sørfold | Rørstad Church | Rørstad | 1761 |
| Sørfold | Røsvik Church | Røsvika | 1883 |
| Sørfold | Mørsvikbotn Chapel | Mørsvikbotn | 1955 |

== Geography ==
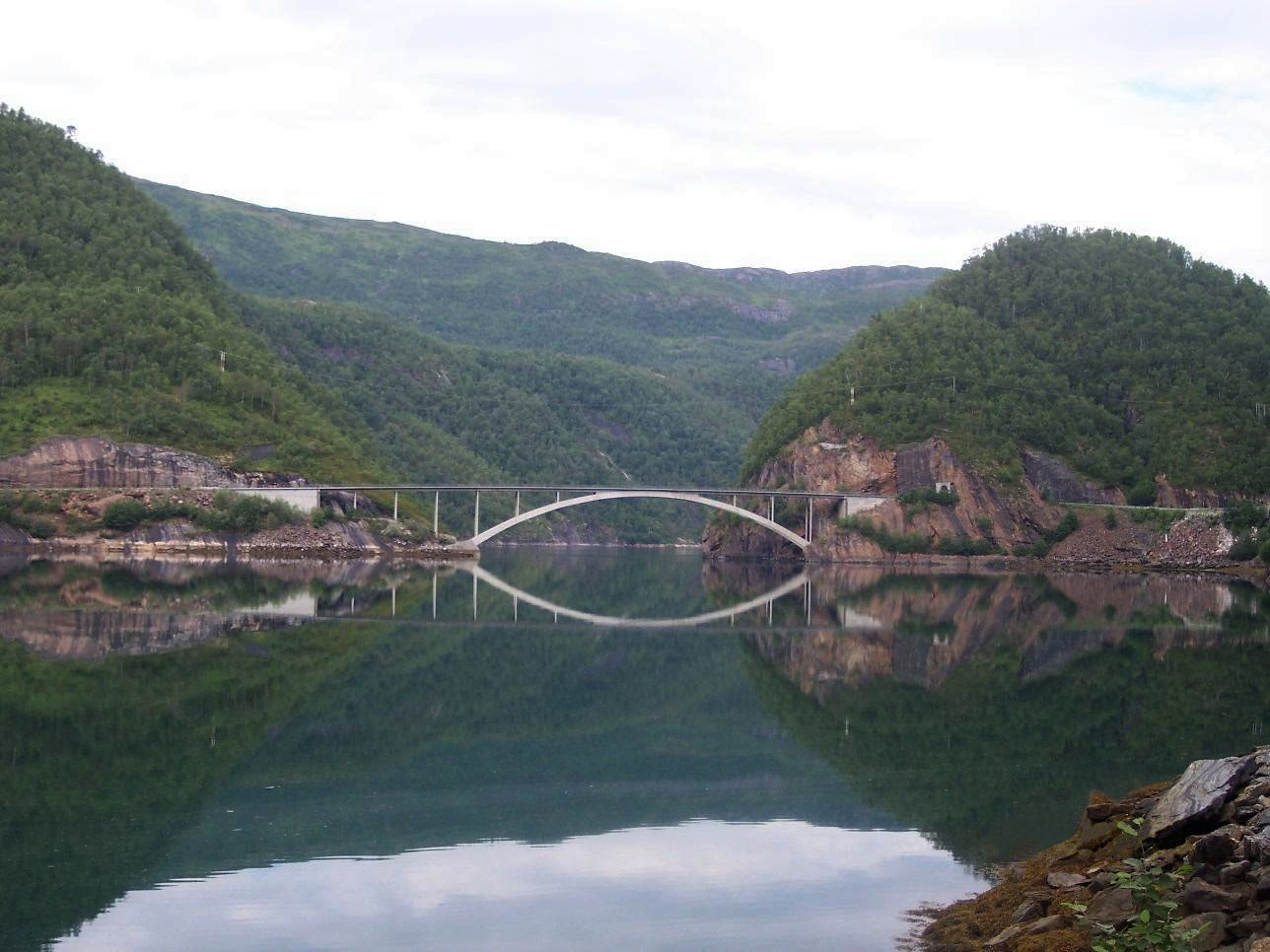
Trengsel Bridge on the E6 road

Sørfold Municipality is located about 120 kilometres (75 mi) north of the Arctic Circle. The total land area of Sørfold is 1,636.61 square kilometres (631.90 sq mi), of which 141 square kilometres (54 sq mi) is covered with permanent ice and snow, and only 265.8 square kilometres (102.6 sq mi) lies below the 150-metre (490 ft) contour line. The total length of coastline is 249 kilometres (155 mi). In 1987, only 3.2 square kilometres (1.2 sq mi) of land was being actively farmed. The highest point in the municipality is the 1,663.6-metre (5,458 ft) tall mountain Skagmatoppen.

To the north of Sørfold is Hamarøy Municipality and to the south is Fauske Municipality. To the east, the Sørfold borders Jokkmokk Municipality in Sweden.

Rago National Park, with its wild nature dominated by bare rock, streams, and pine forest, is located in Sørfold. The glacier Blåmannsisen, one of the largest in Norway, is partly located in the municipality. There are several nature reserves. Veikdalen nature reserve, roughly 300 metres (980 ft) above sea level, protects a largely undisturbed pine and birch forest (some logging before 1918) with many standing dead pine trees.

There are many large lakes in Sørfold, including Andkjelvatnet, Faulvatnet, Forsvatnet, Grovatnet, Horndalsvatnet, Kobbvatnet, Kvitvatnet, Langvatnet, Leirvatnet, Litlverivatnet, Mørsvikvatnet, Nedre Veikvatnet, Røyrvatnet, Rundvatnet, Sildhopvatnet, Sisovatnet, Storskogvatnet, Straumvatnet, and Trollvatnet.

== Government ==
Sørfold Municipality is responsible for primary education (through 10th grade), outpatient health services, senior citizen services, welfare and other social services, zoning, economic development, and municipal roads and utilities. The municipality is governed by a municipal council of directly elected representatives. The mayor is indirectly elected by a vote of the municipal council. The municipality is under the jurisdiction of the Salten og Lofoten District Court and the Hålogaland Court of Appeal.

=== Municipal council ===
The municipal council (Kommunestyre) of Sørfold Municipality is made up of 17 representatives that are elected to four year terms. The tables below show the current and historical composition of the council by political party.

Sørfold kommunestyre 2023–2027
| Party name (in Norwegian) | Number of representatives |
|---|---|
| Labour Party (Arbeiderpartiet) | 7 |
| Conservative Party (Høyre) | 3 |
| Red Party (Rødt) | 1 |
| Centre Party (Senterpartiet) | 5 |
| Socialist Left Party (Sosialistisk Venstreparti) | 1 |
| Total number of members: | 17 |

Sørfold kommunestyre 2019–2023
| Party name (in Norwegian) | Number of representatives |
|---|---|
| Labour Party (Arbeiderpartiet) | 6 |
| Conservative Party (Høyre) | 2 |
| Red Party (Rødt) | 1 |
| Centre Party (Senterpartiet) | 7 |
| Socialist Left Party (Sosialistisk Venstreparti) | 1 |
| Total number of members: | 17 |

Sørfold kommunestyre 2015–2019
| Party name (in Norwegian) | Number of representatives |
|---|---|
| Labour Party (Arbeiderpartiet) | 10 |
| Conservative Party (Høyre) | 3 |
| Centre Party (Senterpartiet) | 6 |
| Socialist Left Party (Sosialistisk Venstreparti) | 2 |
| Total number of members: | 21 |

Sørfold kommunestyre 2011–2015
| Party name (in Norwegian) | Number of representatives |
|---|---|
| Labour Party (Arbeiderpartiet) | 12 |
| Progress Party (Fremskrittspartiet) | 2 |
| Conservative Party (Høyre) | 3 |
| Centre Party (Senterpartiet) | 3 |
| Socialist Left Party (Sosialistisk Venstreparti) | 1 |
| Total number of members: | 21 |

Sørfold kommunestyre 2007–2011
| Party name (in Norwegian) | Number of representatives |
|---|---|
| Labour Party (Arbeiderpartiet) | 12 |
| Progress Party (Fremskrittspartiet) | 2 |
| Conservative Party (Høyre) | 2 |
| Centre Party (Senterpartiet) | 3 |
| Socialist Left Party (Sosialistisk Venstreparti) | 2 |
| Total number of members: | 21 |

Sørfold kommunestyre 2003–2007
| Party name (in Norwegian) | Number of representatives |
|---|---|
| Labour Party (Arbeiderpartiet) | 9 |
| Progress Party (Fremskrittspartiet) | 1 |
| Conservative Party (Høyre) | 2 |
| Centre Party (Senterpartiet) | 5 |
| Socialist Left Party (Sosialistisk Venstreparti) | 4 |
| Total number of members: | 21 |

Sørfold kommunestyre 1999–2003
| Party name (in Norwegian) | Number of representatives |
|---|---|
| Labour Party (Arbeiderpartiet) | 7 |
| Conservative Party (Høyre) | 1 |
| Centre Party (Senterpartiet) | 11 |
| Socialist Left Party (Sosialistisk Venstreparti) | 2 |
| Total number of members: | 21 |

Sørfold kommunestyre 1995–1999
| Party name (in Norwegian) | Number of representatives |
|---|---|
| Labour Party (Arbeiderpartiet) | 9 |
| Conservative Party (Høyre) | 3 |
| Centre Party (Senterpartiet) | 6 |
| Socialist Left Party (Sosialistisk Venstreparti) | 3 |
| Total number of members: | 21 |

Sørfold kommunestyre 1991–1995
| Party name (in Norwegian) | Number of representatives |
|---|---|
| Labour Party (Arbeiderpartiet) | 10 |
| Conservative Party (Høyre) | 2 |
| Christian Democratic Party (Kristelig Folkeparti) | 1 |
| Centre Party (Senterpartiet) | 5 |
| Socialist Left Party (Sosialistisk Venstreparti) | 3 |
| Total number of members: | 21 |

Sørfold kommunestyre 1987–1991
| Party name (in Norwegian) | Number of representatives |
|---|---|
| Labour Party (Arbeiderpartiet) | 10 |
| Conservative Party (Høyre) | 2 |
| Christian Democratic Party (Kristelig Folkeparti) | 1 |
| Centre Party (Senterpartiet) | 4 |
| Socialist Left Party (Sosialistisk Venstreparti) | 2 |
| Sørfold independent list (Sørfold uavhengige liste) | 2 |
| Total number of members: | 21 |

Sørfold kommunestyre 1983–1987
| Party name (in Norwegian) | Number of representatives |
|---|---|
| Labour Party (Arbeiderpartiet) | 12 |
| Conservative Party (Høyre) | 2 |
| Christian Democratic Party (Kristelig Folkeparti) | 1 |
| Centre Party (Senterpartiet) | 4 |
| Socialist Left Party (Sosialistisk Venstreparti) | 2 |
| Total number of members: | 21 |

Sørfold kommunestyre 1979–1983
| Party name (in Norwegian) | Number of representatives |
|---|---|
| Labour Party (Arbeiderpartiet) | 12 |
| Conservative Party (Høyre) | 3 |
| Christian Democratic Party (Kristelig Folkeparti) | 2 |
| Centre Party (Senterpartiet) | 4 |
| Total number of members: | 21 |

Sørfold kommunestyre 1975–1979
| Party name (in Norwegian) | Number of representatives |
|---|---|
| Labour Party (Arbeiderpartiet) | 10 |
| Conservative Party (Høyre) | 3 |
| Christian Democratic Party (Kristelig Folkeparti) | 2 |
| Centre Party (Senterpartiet) | 4 |
| Socialist Left Party (Sosialistisk Venstreparti) | 1 |
| Liberal Party (Venstre) | 1 |
| Total number of members: | 21 |

Sørfold kommunestyre 1971–1975
| Party name (in Norwegian) | Number of representatives |
|---|---|
| Labour Party (Arbeiderpartiet) | 10 |
| Centre Party (Senterpartiet) | 6 |
| Joint List(s) of Non-Socialist Parties (Borgerlige Felleslister) | 3 |
| Local List(s) (Lokale lister) | 2 |
| Total number of members: | 21 |

Sørfold kommunestyre 1967–1971
| Party name (in Norwegian) | Number of representatives |
|---|---|
| Labour Party (Arbeiderpartiet) | 12 |
| Centre Party (Senterpartiet) | 6 |
| Joint List(s) of Non-Socialist Parties (Borgerlige Felleslister) | 3 |
| Total number of members: | 21 |

Sørfold kommunestyre 1963–1967
| Party name (in Norwegian) | Number of representatives |
|---|---|
| Labour Party (Arbeiderpartiet) | 13 |
| Joint List(s) of Non-Socialist Parties (Borgerlige Felleslister) | 8 |
| Total number of members: | 21 |

Sørfold herredsstyre 1959–1963
| Party name (in Norwegian) | Number of representatives |
|---|---|
| Labour Party (Arbeiderpartiet) | 12 |
| Joint List(s) of Non-Socialist Parties (Borgerlige Felleslister) | 8 |
| Local List(s) (Lokale lister) | 1 |
| Total number of members: | 21 |

Sørfold herredsstyre 1955–1959
| Party name (in Norwegian) | Number of representatives |
|---|---|
| Labour Party (Arbeiderpartiet) | 12 |
| Communist Party (Kommunistiske Parti) | 1 |
| Joint List(s) of Non-Socialist Parties (Borgerlige Felleslister) | 8 |
| Total number of members: | 21 |

Sørfold herredsstyre 1951–1955
| Party name (in Norwegian) | Number of representatives |
|---|---|
| Labour Party (Arbeiderpartiet) | 11 |
| Communist Party (Kommunistiske Parti) | 2 |
| Joint List(s) of Non-Socialist Parties (Borgerlige Felleslister) | 7 |
| Total number of members: | 20 |

Sørfold herredsstyre 1947–1951
| Party name (in Norwegian) | Number of representatives |
|---|---|
| Labour Party (Arbeiderpartiet) | 11 |
| Christian Democratic Party (Kristelig Folkeparti) | 2 |
| Joint List(s) of Non-Socialist Parties (Borgerlige Felleslister) | 5 |
| Local List(s) (Lokale lister) | 2 |
| Total number of members: | 20 |

Sørfold herredsstyre 1945–1947
| Party name (in Norwegian) | Number of representatives |
|---|---|
| Labour Party (Arbeiderpartiet) | 11 |
| Communist Party (Kommunistiske Parti) | 2 |
| Joint List(s) of Non-Socialist Parties (Borgerlige Felleslister) | 7 |
| Total number of members: | 20 |

Sørfold herredsstyre 1937–1941*
| Party name (in Norwegian) | Number of representatives |
|---|---|
| Labour Party (Arbeiderpartiet) | 11 |
| List of workers, fishermen, and small farmholders (Arbeidere, fiskere, småbrukere liste) | 1 |
| Joint List(s) of Non-Socialist Parties (Borgerlige Felleslister) | 8 |
| Total number of members: | 20 |
Note: Due to the German occupation of Norway during World War II, no elections were held for new municipal councils until after the war ended in 1945.

=== Mayors ===
The mayor (Norwegian: ordfører) of Sørfold Municipality is the political leader of the municipality and the chairperson of the municipal council. Here is a list of people who have held this position:

- 1887–1888: Rev. Lars J. Wormdahl (H)
- 1889–1892: Johannes Larsen Skarstrøm
- 1893–1896: Nils Lie (V)
- 1897–1899: Hans A. Pedersen (LL)
- 1899–1901: Einar Amlie (LL)
- 1902–1907: Henrik Brækkan (H)
- 1908–1920: Petter Skog (LL)
- 1920–1927: Søren Øigaard (LL)
- 1927–1935: Søren L. Ørnes (Bp)
- 1935–1940: Johan Abelsen (Ap)
- 1941–1945: Olaf Hestvik (NS)
- 1945–1945: Johan Abelsen (Ap)
- 1946–1951: Magnus Lilleeng (Ap)
- 1952–1963: Hilmar Hammerfall (Ap)
- 1964–1971: Ottar Vollan (Ap)
- 1972–1975: Edvin Didriksen (Ap)
- 1976–1995: Frantz Pettersen (Ap)
- 1995–2003: Jakob Jakobsen (Sp)
- 2003–2019: Lars Evjenth (Ap)
- 2019–2023: Gisle Hansen (Sp)
- 2023–present: Kolbjørn Mathisen (Ap)

== History ==
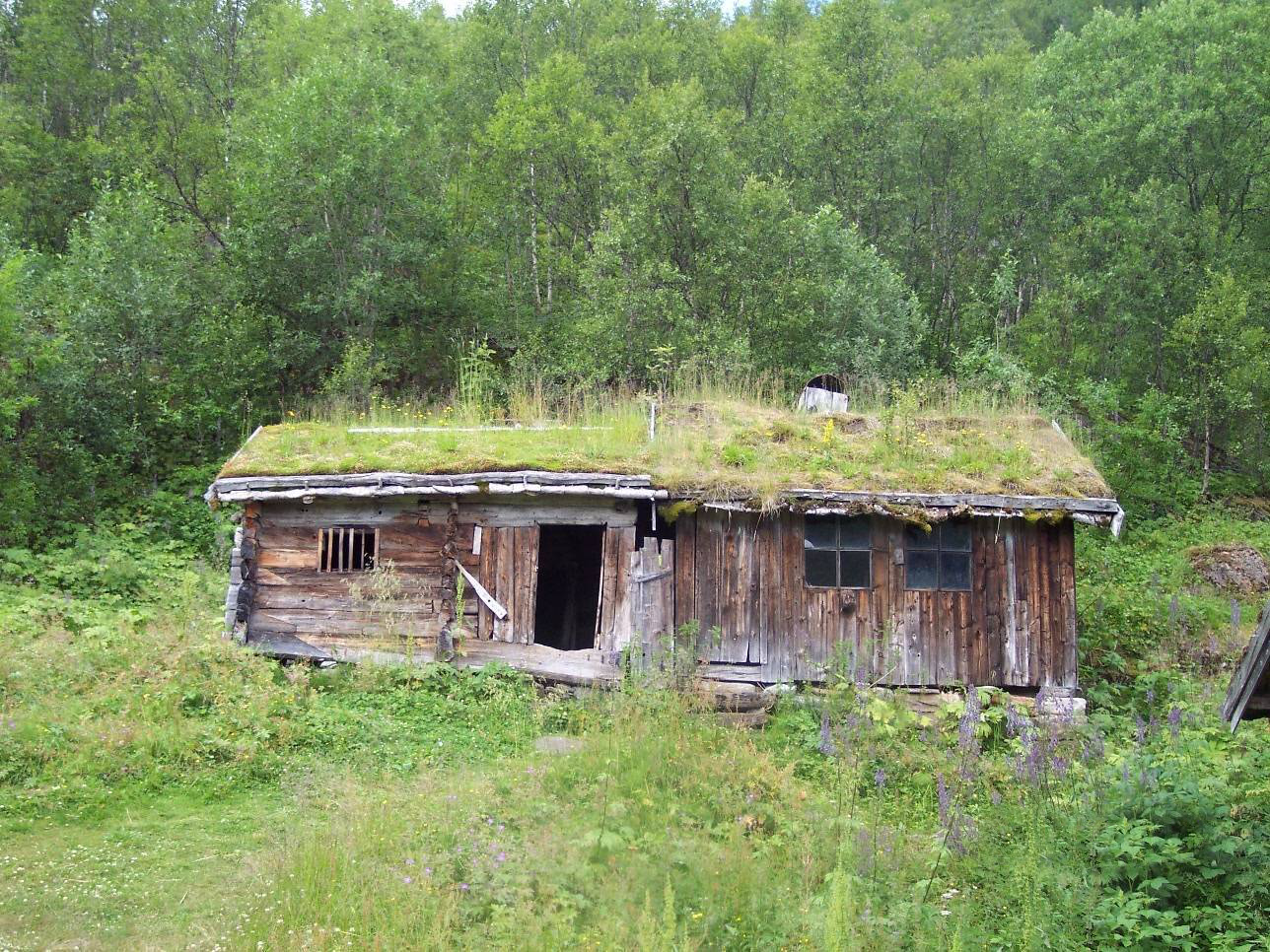
Husmannsplass Kjelvik

The small village of Mørsvikbotn is located in the north part of the municipality. About 5 kilometres (3.1 mi) north of Mørsvikbotn lies the lake Mørsvikvatnet. In this area, Mørsry, the German army had a prisoner-of-war camp during World War II housing mostly Russian POWs. They were building the Polarbanen railway, which was intended to be a link between Fauske and Narvik. Some ruins of the camp, the foundations of the railway line, a tunnel, and roads can still be observed. A small, now empty, cemetery for fallen Russian soldiers is located close to the camp, about 50 metres (160 ft) off the left-hand side just before the single concrete bridge.

== Notable people ==
- Alfred B. Skar (1896 in Sørfold – 1969), a newspaper editor, writer, trade unionist, and politician
- Eivind Tverbak (1897 in Sørfold – 1982), a novelist and children's writer
- Oddmund Ingvald Jensen (1928 in Sørfold – 2011), a cross-country skier and coach who competed at the 1956 and 1960 Winter Olympics
- Thor Helland (1936 in Sørfold – 2021), a 5000-metre runner who competed in the 1964 Summer Olympics
