= Mørsvikvatnet =

Lake in Sørfold, Norway

Mørsvikvatnet (Norwegian) Murgosjávrre (Lule Sami)
- Interactive map of the lake
- Location: Sørfold Municipality, Nordland
- Coordinates: 67.7233°N 15.9162°E
- Basin countries: Norway
- Max. length: 2.1 kilometres (1.3 mi)
- Max. width: 1 kilometre (0.62 mi)
- Surface area: 1.1 km^{2} (0.42 sq mi)
- Shore length^{1}: 5.5 kilometres (3.4 mi)
- Surface elevation: 78 metres (256 ft)
- References: NVE
- ^{1} Shore length is not a well-defined measure.

Mørsvikvatnet (Norwegian) or Murgosjávrre (Lule Sami) is a lake located in Sørfold Municipality in Nordland county, Norway. The 1.1-square-kilometre (0.42 sq mi) lake lies on the northeastern side of the village of Mørsvikbotn. The European route E6 highway runs along the western edge of the lake.

== See also ==
- List of lakes in Norway
- Geography of Norway
