= Sildhopvatnet =

Lake in Nordland, Norway

Sildhopvatnet (Norwegian) Silldavuopjávrre (Lule Sami)
- Interactive map of the lake
- Location: Sørfold Municipality, Nordland
- Coordinates: 67.7013°N 15.9057°E
- Basin countries: Norway
- Max. length: 3.8 kilometres (2.4 mi)
- Max. width: 900 metres (3,000 ft)
- Surface area: 2.16 km^{2} (0.83 sq mi)
- Shore length^{1}: 8.61 kilometres (5.35 mi)
- Surface elevation: 88 metres (289 ft)
- References: NVE
- ^{1} Shore length is not a well-defined measure.

Sildhopvatnet (Norwegian) or Silldavuopjávrre (Lule Sami) is a lake located in Sørfold Municipality in Nordland county, Norway. The 2.16-square-kilometre (0.83 sq mi) lake is located on the east side of the village of Mørsvikbotn.

== See also ==
- List of lakes in Norway
- Geography of Norway
