= Mørsvikbotn Chapel =

Church in Nordland, Norway

- Mørsvikbotn kapell
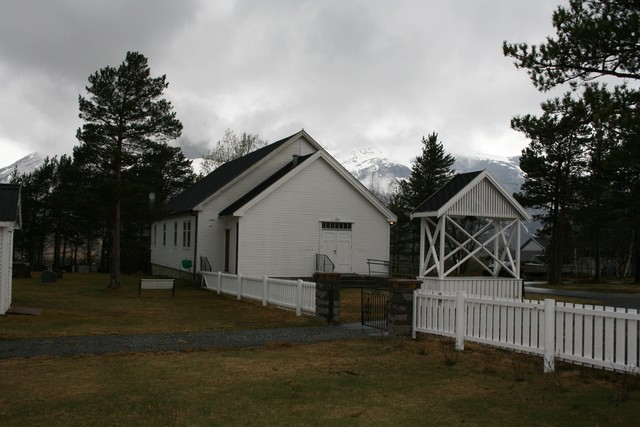
- View of the chapel
- Mørsvikbotn Chapel
- 67.69150970°N 15.8476286°E
- Location: Sørfold Municipality, Nordland
- Country: Norway
- Denomination: Church of Norway
- Churchmanship: Evangelical Lutheran

History
- Status: Chapel
- Founded: 1955
- Consecrated: 1955

Architecture
- Functional status: Active
- Architectural type: Long church
- Completed: 1955 (71 years ago)

Specifications
- Capacity: 140
- Materials: Wood

Administration
- Diocese: Sør-Hålogaland
- Deanery: Salten prosti
- Parish: Sørfold
- Norwegian Cultural Heritage Site
- Type: Church
- Status: Not protected
- ID: 85085

Mørsvikbotn Chapel (Norwegian: Mørsvikbotn kapell) is a chapel of the Church of Norway in Sørfold Municipality in Nordland county, Norway. It is located in the village of Mørsvikbotn. It is an annex chapel in the Sørfold parish which is part of the Salten prosti (deanery) in the Diocese of Sør-Hålogaland. The white, wooden chapel was built in a long church style in 1955. The chapel seats about 140 people.

== See also ==
- List of churches in Sør-Hålogaland
