= Eivind Tverbak =

Norwegian writer

Eivind Tverbak (4 April 1897, in Sørfold Municipality, Salten – 1982) was a Norwegian novelist and children's writer from Sørfold Municipality. He wrote several novels from fishermen's life in Northern Norway. He has also written books for children. He was awarded the Gyldendal's Endowment in 1957.
