= Kobbvatnet =

Lake in Sørfold, Norway

Kobbvatnet (Norwegian) Gåpjávrre (Lule Sami)
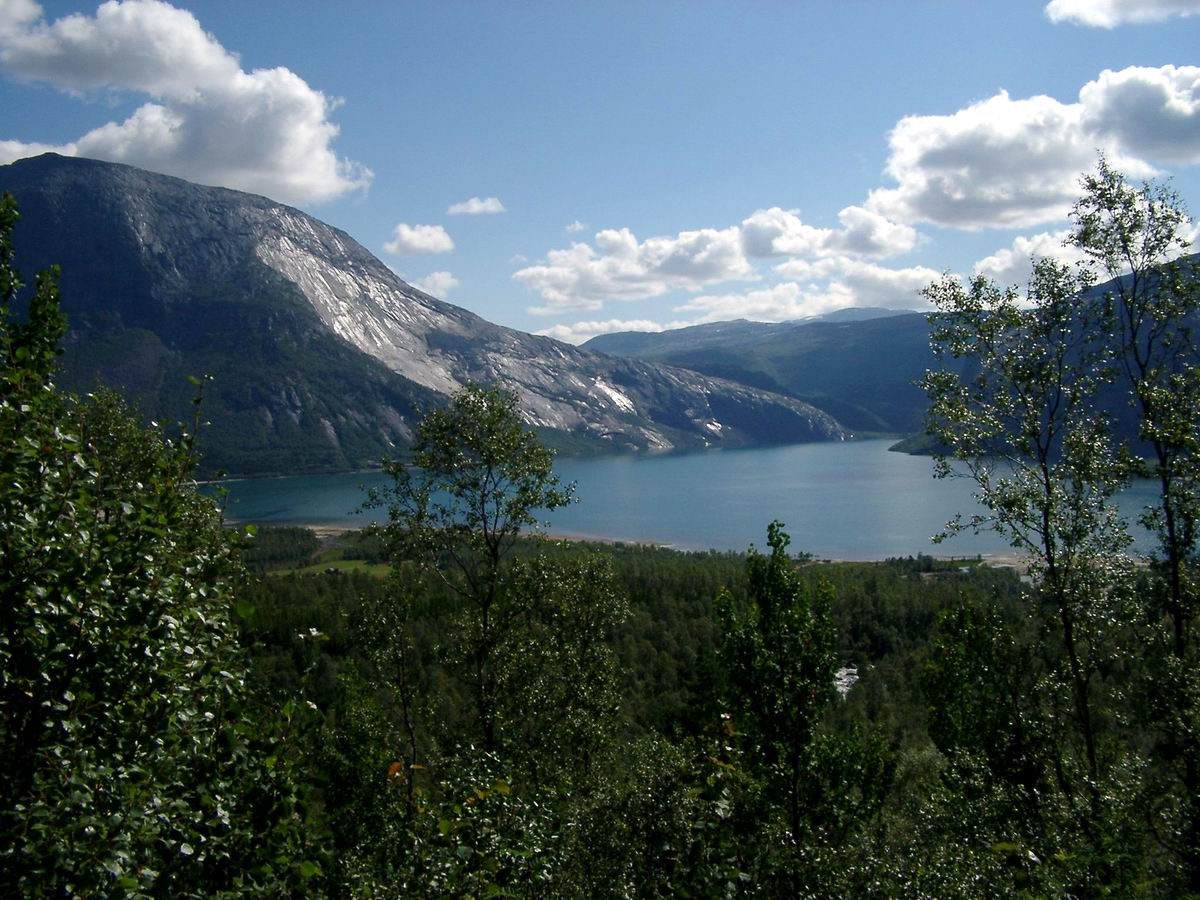
- Interactive map of the lake
- Location: Sørfold Municipality, Nordland
- Coordinates: 67.6219°N 15.9691°E
- Basin countries: Norway
- Max. length: 4 kilometres (2.5 mi)
- Max. width: 2.5 kilometres (1.6 mi)
- Surface area: 5.07 km^{2} (1.96 sq mi)
- Shore length^{1}: 12.8 kilometres (8.0 mi)
- Surface elevation: 8 metres (26 ft)
- References: NVE
- ^{1} Shore length is not a well-defined measure.

Kobbvatnet (Norwegian) or Gåpjávrre (Lule Sami) is a lake that lies in Sørfold Municipality in Nordland county, Norway. The 5.07-square-kilometre (1.96 sq mi) lake lies about 10 kilometres (6.2 mi) southeast of the village of Mørsvikbotn, along the European route E6 highway.

== See also ==
- List of lakes in Norway
- Geography of Norway
