= Langvatnet (Tysfjord) =

Lake on the Norway-Sweden border

Langvatnet (Norwegian) Tjoaddnejávrre (Lule Sami)
- Historic: Čoadnejávri (Lule Sami)
- Interactive map of the lake
- Location: Hamarøy, Nordland; Jokkmokk, Norrbotten
- Coordinates: 67.9233°N 16.6319°E
- Basin countries: Norway and Sweden
- Max. length: 6.5 kilometres (4.0 mi)
- Max. width: 1.7 kilometres (1.1 mi)
- Surface area: 5.46 km^{2} (2.11 sq mi) (5.45 km² in Norway)
- Shore length^{1}: 28.26 kilometres (17.56 mi)
- Surface elevation: 727 metres (2,385 ft)
- References: NVE
- ^{1} Shore length is not a well-defined measure.

Langvatnet (Norwegian) or Tjoaddnejávrre (Lule Sami) is a lake that lies on the border between Norway and Sweden. Almost all of the lake is located in Hamarøy Municipality in Nordland county, Norway with a very small part of the lake in Jokkmokk Municipality in Norrbotten County, Sweden. The 5.46-square-kilometre (2.11 sq mi) lake is located about 20 kilometres (12 mi) southeast of the village of Kjøpsvik in Tysfjord.

== See also ==
- List of lakes in Norway
