= Straumvatnet =

Lake in Sørfold, Norway

Straumvatnet (Norwegian); Strávvejávrre (Lule Sami)
- Interactive map of the lake
- Location: Sørfold Municipality, Nordland
- Coordinates: 67.3260°N 15.6546°E
- Basin countries: Norway
- Max. length: 5 kilometres (3.1 mi)
- Max. width: 2 kilometres (1.2 mi)
- Surface area: 6.74 km^{2} (2.60 sq mi)
- Shore length^{1}: 13.52 kilometres (8.40 mi)
- Surface elevation: 5 metres (16 ft)
- References: NVE
- ^{1} Shore length is not a well-defined measure.

Straumvatnet (Norwegian) or Strávvejávrre (Lule Sami) is a lake that lies in Sørfold Municipality in Nordland county, Norway. The lake is located on the southeast side of the village of Straumen. The lake Røyrvatnet lies about 750 metres (2,460 ft) south of this lake. Straumvatnet empties into the Sørfolda fjord.

== See also ==
- List of lakes in Norway
- Geography of Norway
