= Blåmannsisen =

Glacier in Nordland, Norway

Blåmannsisen (Norwegian) Ålmåjalosjiegŋa (Lule Sami)
- Historic: Olmmaijiekna (Lule Sami)
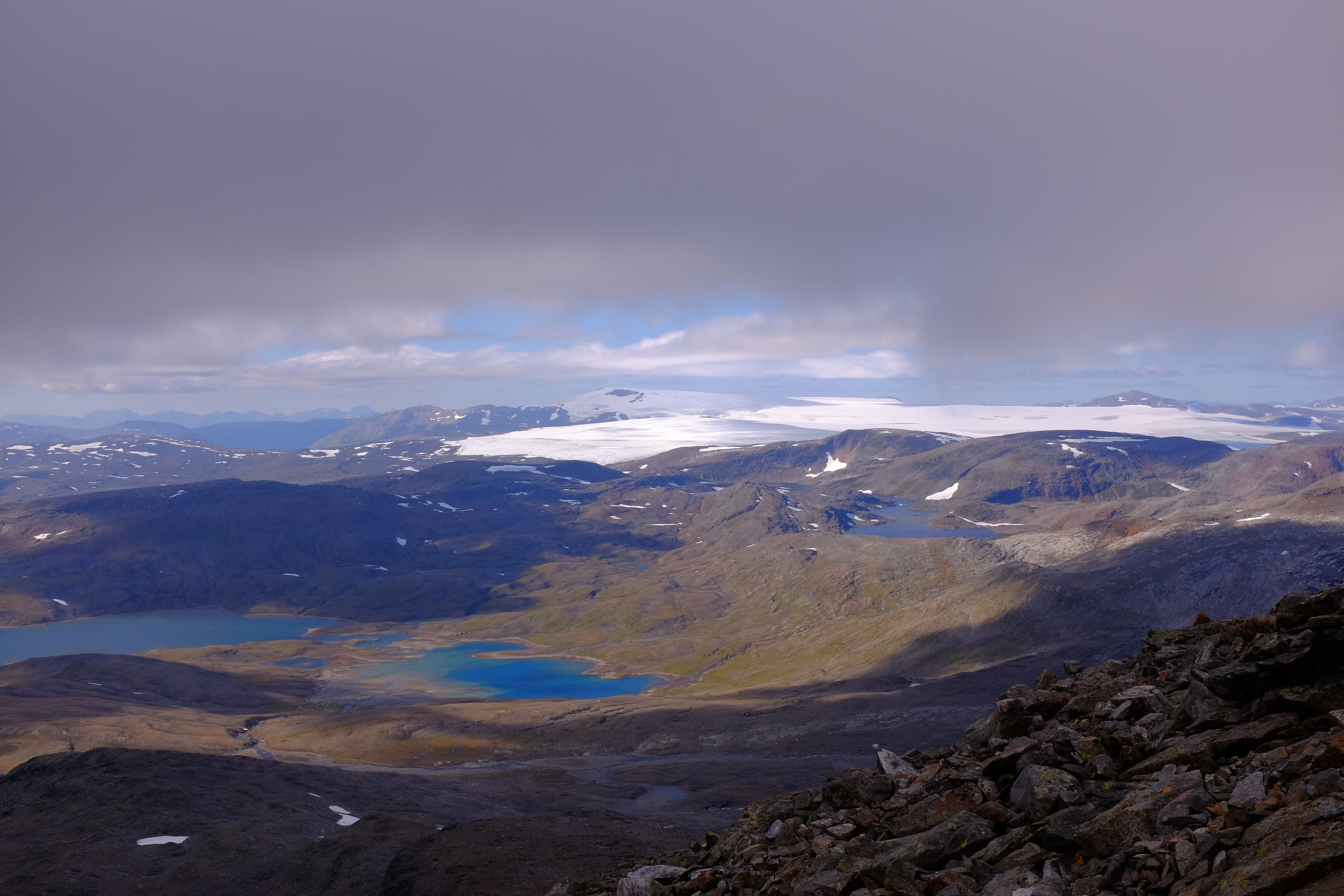
- Interactive map of Blåmannsisen (Norwegian); Ålmåjalosjiegŋa (Lule Sami)
- Location: Nordland, Norway
- Coordinates: 67.2414°N 16.0672°E
- Area: 87 km^{2} (34 sq mi)
- Thickness: 200 to 400 m (660 to 1,310 ft)
- Highest elevation: 1,560 metres (5,120 ft)
- Lowest elevation: 810 metres (2,660 ft)

Blåmannsisen (Norwegian) or Ålmåjalosjiegŋa (Lule Sami) (English: Blåmann Glacier) is the fifth-largest glacier in mainland Norway. It is located on the border of Fauske Municipality and Sørfold Municipality in Nordland county, Norway—just 2 kilometres (1.2 mi) west of the border with Sweden.

Its highest point is 1,560 metres (5,120 ft) above sea level and its lowest point is at an elevation of 810 metres (2,660 ft). Three outlet glaciers extend from the icecap. A small outlet spills over a subglacial ridge to the north damming an unnamed lake resulting in occasion outburst floods. To the east a large outlet extends towards the lake, Leirvatnet. A further outlet descends steeply to the west. The western and northern outlets are heavily crevassed, as is the snout of the eastern glacier calving into Leirvatnet. The glacier also calves into lake Blåmannsisvatnet, resulting in extensive crevasses in the glacier above that lake. Given the degree of crevassing at the margins, traversing the glacier can be dangerous, particularly in late spring or early summer when snow bridges may be weak.

Blåmannsisen drains into the local Norwegian hydropower networks operated by Elkem and Saltens Kraftsamband and into the one in Luleälv, Sweden. The ice-dammed lake on the northern margin occasionally produces jökulhlaups (also known as glacial lake outburst floods). The icecap is typically 200 to 400 m (660 to 1,310 ft) thick, exceeding 800 metres (2,600 ft) in places. The equilibrium line altitude (ELA) is around 1,100 metres (3,600 ft) on the eastern side of the icecap, above the Leirvatnet outlet. Satellite imagery, including that used by Google Earth, shows extensive exposed firn suggesting the ELA has retreated in recent years in common with other temperate icecaps in Norway. The southern margin of the glacier exhibits a forefield exposed since the retreat from the 'Little Ice Age' maximum with a well formed end moraine marking a former margin.

== See also ==
- List of glaciers in Norway
