= Rago National Park =

National park in Nordland, Norway

- IUCN category II (national park)

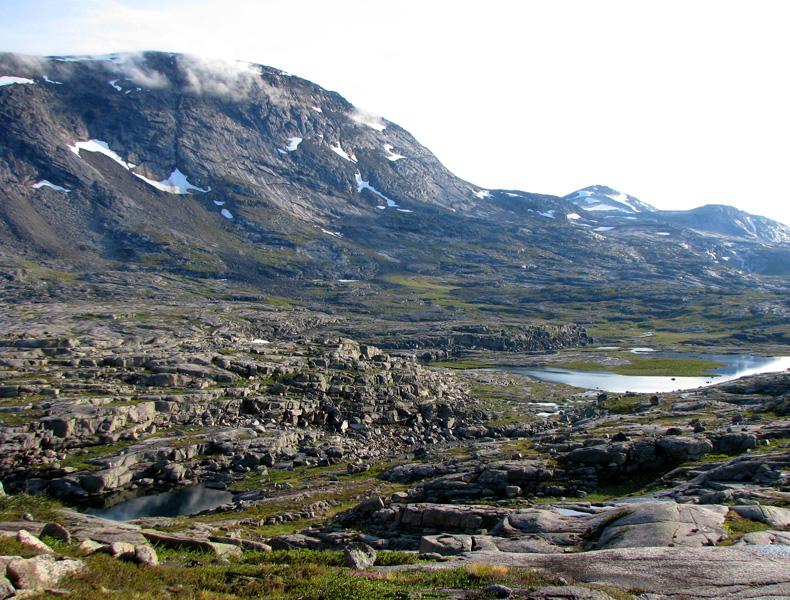
- Interactive map of Rago National Park
- Location: Sørfold, Nordland, Norway
- Nearest city: Fauske
- Coordinates: 67°26′N 15°59′E
- Area: 171 km^{2} (66 sq mi)
- Established: 1971
- Governing body: Directorate for Nature Management

Rago National Park (Norwegian: Rago nasjonalpark) is a national park in Sørfold Municipality in Nordland county, Norway. The 171-square-kilometre (66 sq mi) park lies east of European route E6, about 10 kilometres (6.2 mi) northeast of the village of Straumen. The park was established on 22 January 1971.

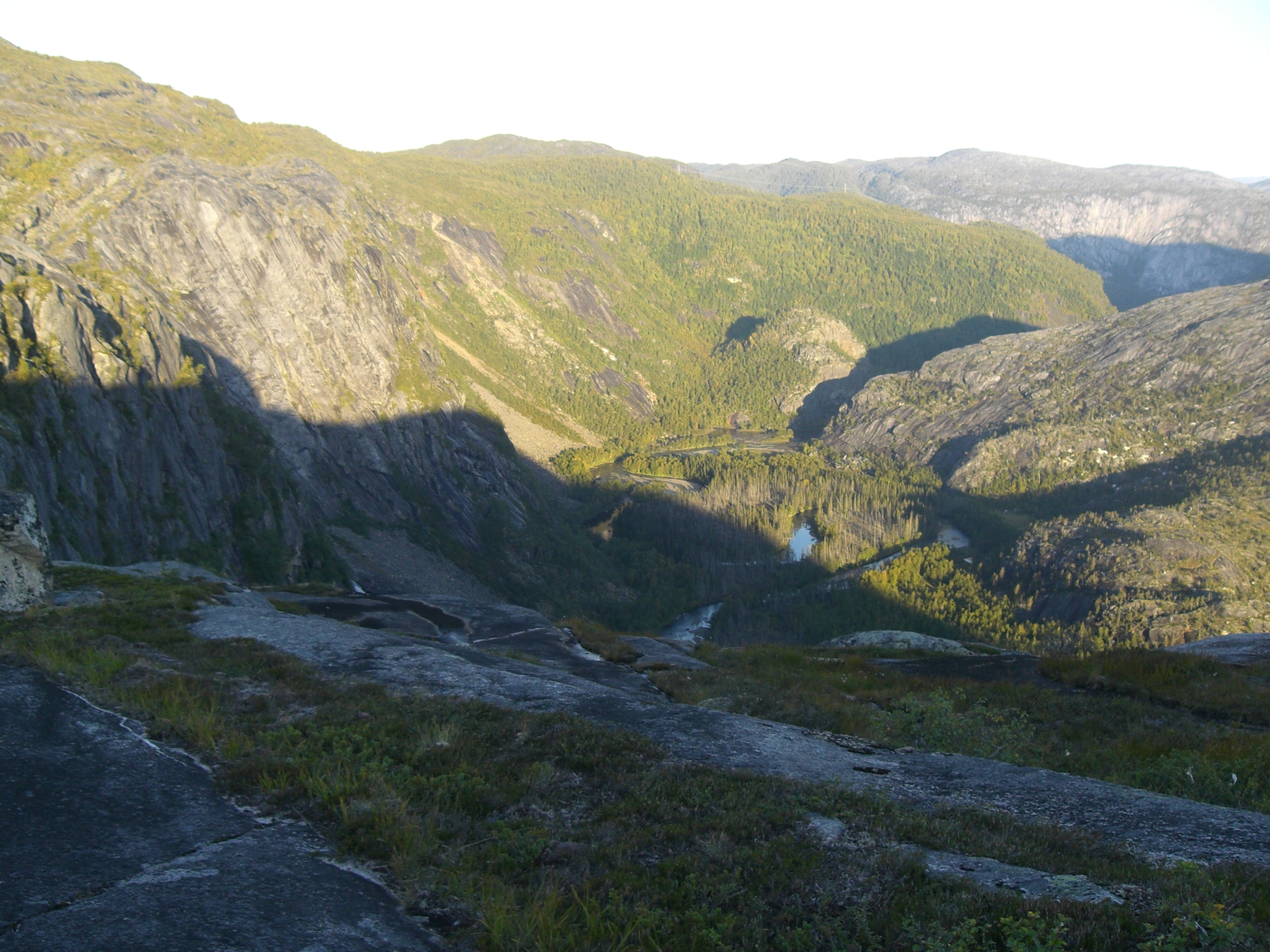
Valley in Rago NP

Rago borders Sweden's Padjelanta National Park, which in turn borders two other parks, and the combined of all the protected land is a total of ca. 5,400 square kilometres (2,100 sq mi)—creating one of the largest protected areas in Europe.

The lakes Storskogvatnet and Litlverivatnet lie within the park. There are several glaciers in the southeastern part of the park. Rago National Park does not have a rich variety of plants, due partly to its poor soils and harsh climate. The wooded areas consist mostly of pine. Many alpine plants grow among the trees.

There isn't a wide variety of animal and bird life either. Moose live in the park along with semi-domesticated reindeer. There are also wolverines in the park. Willow grouse and golden eagles are frequently seen in the park.

== Name ==
The name comes from the Sami name Rákkok, meaning "difficult and impassable mountain region".
