= Mørsvikbotn =

Village in Sørfold Municipality, Norway

Mørsvikbotn or Mørsvik (Norwegian) Murgos (Lule Sami)
- Village
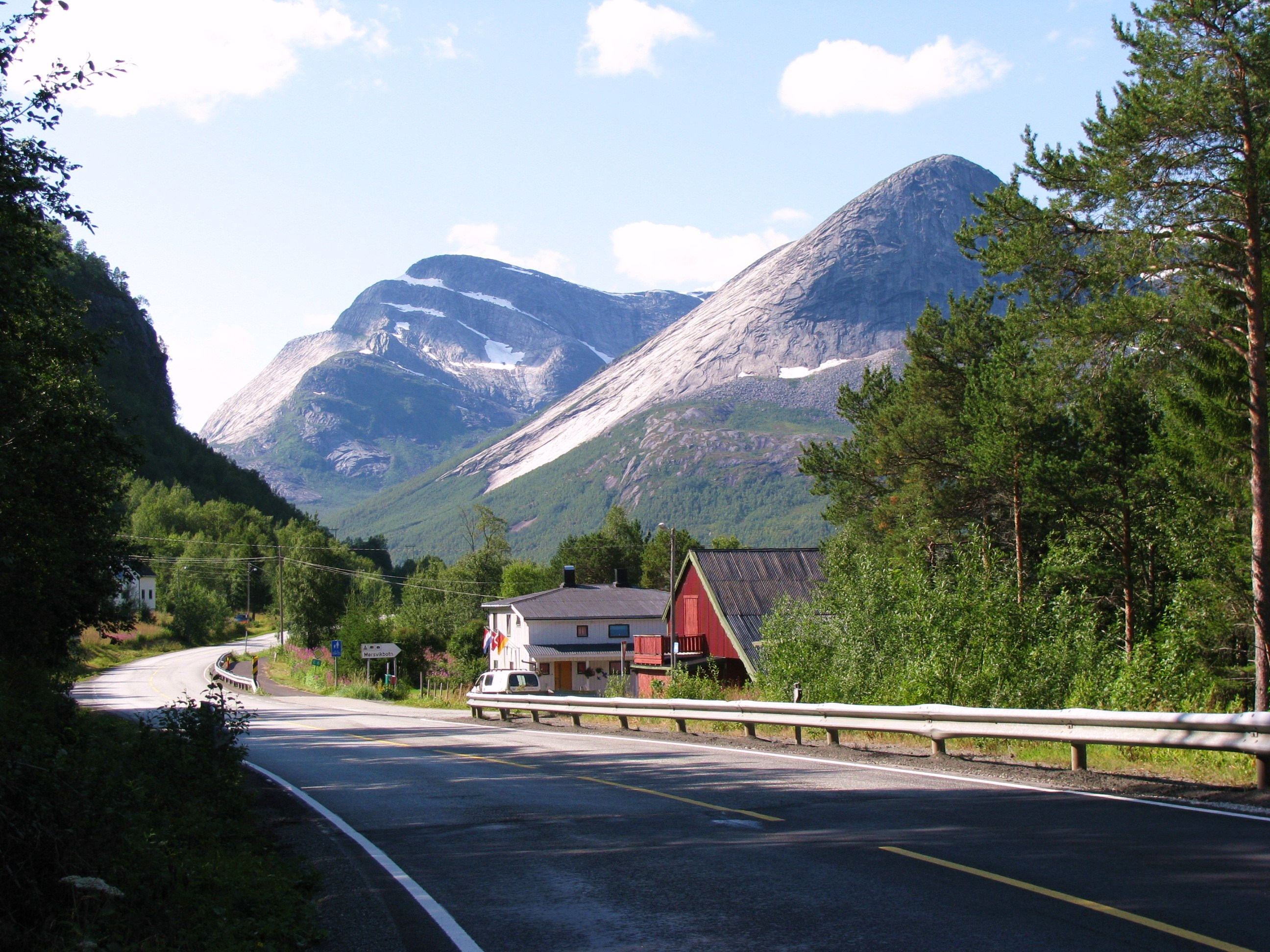
- View of the village
- Interactive map of Mørsvikbotn or Mørsvik (Norwegian); Murgos (Lule Sami)
- Location within Nordland Location within Norway
- Coordinates: 67.7085°N 15.8571°E
- Country: Norway
- Region: Northern Norway
- County: Nordland
- District: Salten
- Municipality: Sørfold Municipality
- Elevation: 8 m (26 ft)
- Time zone: UTC+01:00 (CET)
  - Summer (DST): UTC+02:00 (CEST)
- Post Code: 8266 Mørsvikbotn

Mørsvikbotn or Mørsvik (Norwegian) or Murgos (Lule Sami) is a small village located in the north part of Sørfold Municipality in Nordland county, Norway. The village sits at the end of the Mørsvikfjorden arm of the Nordfolda fjord. The European route E6 highway passes through the village. The lakes Mørsvikvatnet and Sildhopvatnet are located northeast of the village. Mørsvikbotn has a school, shops, grocery, Mørsvikbotn Chapel, an aquaculture co-op, and a few camping sites.

The village is centered around the farm Mørsvik at the end of the fjord, known as Mørsvikbotn, so the larger village area is also known as Mørsvikbotn. The local name in the Lule Sami language is Murgos for the farm and village area.

== History ==
=== World War II POW camp ===
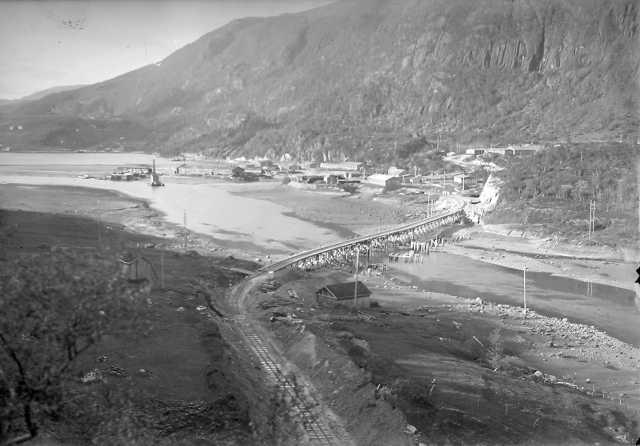
View of the POWs building a railway

About 5 kilometres (3.1 mi) north of Mørsvikbotn, near the lake Mørsvikvatnet at "Mørsry", the German Army had a prisoner-of-war camp during World War II. The German Army soldiers serving here were from Austria, housing mostly Russian POWs. They were building a railway, which was intended to be a link between Fauske and Narvik. This was to be the so-called "Polarbanen" (English: Arctic railway).

Some ruins of the camp, the foundations of the causeway for the railway, a tunnel, and roads can still be observed in the area. A small cemetery for fallen Russian soldiers is located close to the camp. The Camp Commander was considered by the locals to be quite "humane". Only a very few Russian POWs were shot or died of exhaustion during the five years of the war. The small camp cemetery was emptied of corpses shortly after the war. Their remains now rest with about 8,000 other POWs at the large war cemetery at Tjøtta, south of Sandnessjøen.

==== Escapes ====
Some escapes are known by the Norwegian population living close to the camp. The first escape was from the small subsidiary camp at Sildhopen. The local German guard trusted the Red Army POWs. Late one evening, after some alcohol consumption, one of the Russians used an axe on the guard's head. Thereafter, the POWs escaped east over the mountains. For unknown reasons they went the wrong direction after the climb over first mountain, and headed south down to the lake Kobbvatnet. There, they were recaptured. They were brought back to Mørsry, and executed while standing with their backs to a large stone. There were bullet marks for many years after the war on this stone. (This stone is located at the end of the road that goes north of Mørsvikvatnet, about 50–60 metres (160–200 ft) into the woods on the left side.)

Another escape by Polish workers (not POWs) from the nearby camp, Tømmernesset, escaped to Sweden via Mørsvikvatnet. Some say the two young Poles came from the camp at Mørsry. They were helped by a local, Alfred M. Iversen, who happened to meet them in the area. He promised he would meet them at the shores of a small lake the following Sunday. This was "Lisjvatnet", a small lake in the same valley as Sildhopvatnet. So the following Sunday he met them there bringing equipment (skis and clothes) and a bottle of vodka. Giving them a good description of how to find their way to Sweden. He also gave them his address, so that they could "send him a postcard from Sweden", which they did after the war. One of them, Aleksander Robaszkiewicz, then living in Australia, visited Mørsvikbotn in the late 1990s. But did not meet his helper Alfred M. Iversen, as he died some years before.

There was also another escape from the camp in Mørsry, or possibly an escape from a labor team. The POW was recaptured somewhere north of Tennvannet / Tennvasskollen, and was shot nearby on the northwest shore of that lake. This was observed by Reidar Kirkfjell and his wife Ninni who lived nearby.
