= Straumen, Nordland =

Village in Sørfold Municipality, Norway

Straumen
- Village
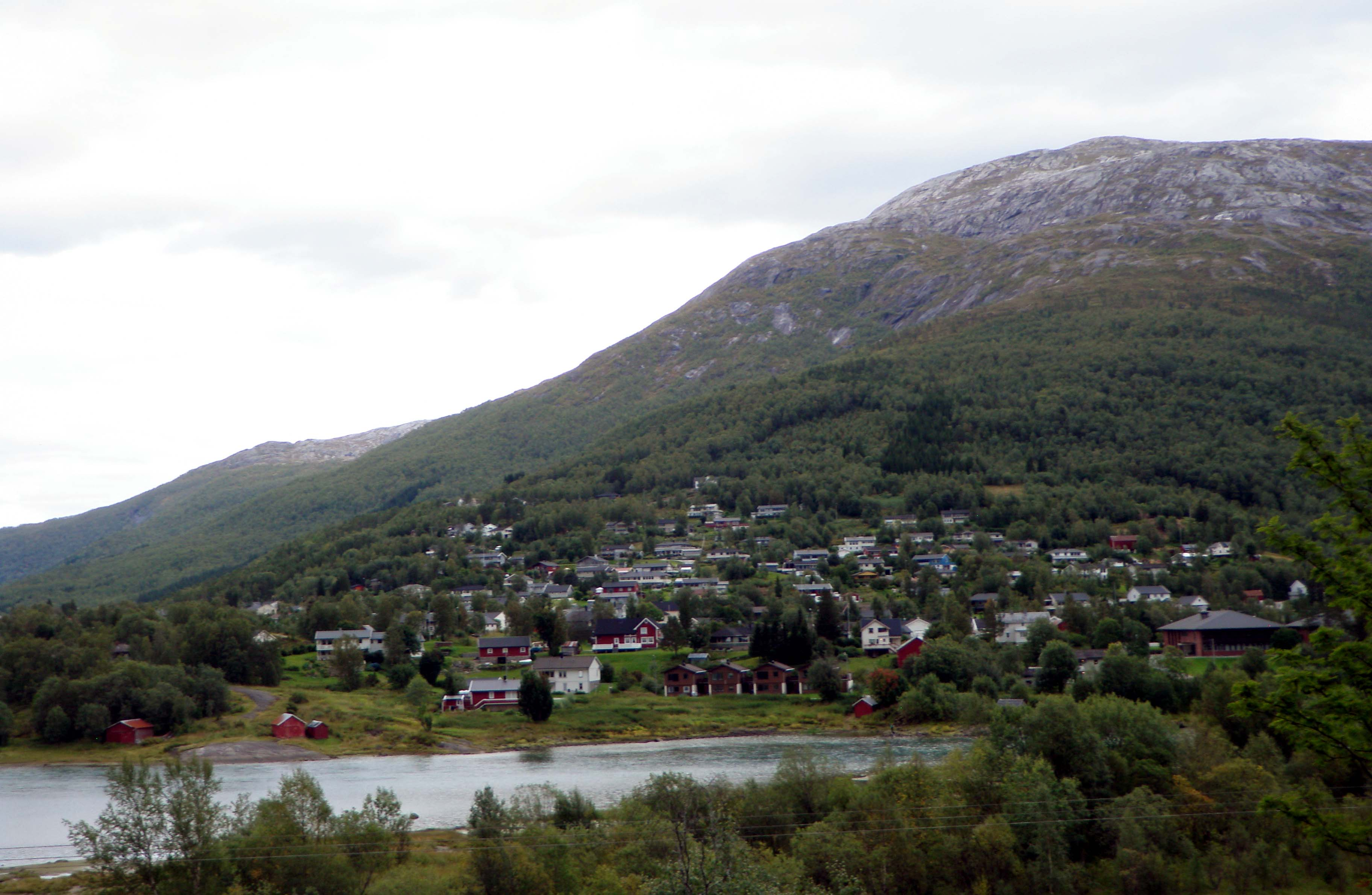
- View of the village
- Interactive map of Straumen
- Location within Nordland Location within Norway
- Coordinates: 67.3481°N 15.5972°E
- Country: Norway
- Region: Northern Norway
- County: Nordland
- District: Salten
- Municipality: Sørfold Municipality

Area
  - Total: 1.08 km^{2} (0.42 sq mi)
- Elevation: 9 m (30 ft)

Population (2023)
  - Total: 844
  - Density: 781/km^{2} (2,020/sq mi)
- Time zone: UTC+01:00 (CET)
  - Summer (DST): UTC+02:00 (CEST)
- Post Code: 8226 Straumen

Straumen is the administrative centre of Sørfold Municipality in Nordland county, Norway. The village is located at the end of the Sørfolda fjord, along the European route E06 highway. The lake Straumvatnet lies on the southeastern side of the village, and the town of Fauske lies about 12 kilometres (7.5 mi) to the southwest.

The 1.08-square-kilometre (270-acre) village has a population (2023) of 844 and a population density of 781 inhabitants per square kilometre (2,020/sq mi).
