= Grane =

Grane may refer to the following:

== Places ==
- Grane Municipality, a municipality in Nordland county, Norway
- Grane, Nordland, a village within Grane Municipality in Nordland county, Norway
- Grane Church, a church in Grane Municipality in Nordland county, Norway
- Grâne, Drôme, a commune in Drôme, France
- Grane, an old name for Kuwait
- Grane (river), a river in Lower Saxony, Germany
- Grane Dam, a river dam in Langelsheim, Lower Saxony, Germany
- Grane oil field, an oil field in the North Sea
- Grane Oil Pipeline, an oil pipeline system in Western Norway

== Other ==
- IK Grane, a sports club from Arendal, Norway
- Grani, the horse of Sigurd in Norse mythology, rendered as Grane for the horse of Brynhildr (Brünnhilde) in Der Ring des Nibelungen by Richard Wagner.
