= Storsvenningvatnet =

Lake in Grane, Norway

Storsvenningvatnet (Norwegian) Svijjege (Southern Sami)
- Interactive map of the lake
- Location: Grane Municipality, Nordland
- Coordinates: 65.3289°N 13.3468°E
- Basin countries: Norway
- Max. length: 5 kilometres (3.1 mi)
- Max. width: 1.8 kilometres (1.1 mi)
- Surface area: 5.18 km^{2} (2.00 sq mi)
- Shore length^{1}: 13.65 kilometres (8.48 mi)
- Surface elevation: 184 metres (604 ft)
- References: NVE
- ^{1} Shore length is not a well-defined measure.

Storsvenningvatnet (Norwegian) or Svijjege (Southern Sami) is a lake in Grane Municipality in Nordland county, Norway. It lies about halfway between the villages of Trofors and Majavatn. The European route E6 highway runs along the eastern side of the lake. The lake Gåsvatnet lies 4 kilometres (2.5 mi) to the west of Storsvenningvatnet and the large lake Nedre Fiplingvatnet lies 7 kilometres (4.3 mi) to the east.

== See also ==
- List of lakes in Norway
- Geography of Norway
