= Sefrivatnet =

Lake in Grane, Norway

Sefrivatnet (Norwegian) Sohkerde (Southern Sami)
- Interactive map of the lake
- Location: Grane Municipality, Nordland
- Coordinates: 65.2432°N 13.3079°E
- Basin countries: Norway
- Max. length: 2.8 kilometres (1.7 mi)
- Max. width: 2.3 kilometres (1.4 mi)
- Surface area: 2.36 km^{2} (0.91 sq mi)
- Shore length^{1}: 10.52 kilometres (6.54 mi)
- Surface elevation: 301 metres (988 ft)
- References: NVE
- ^{1} Shore length is not a well-defined measure.

Sefrivatnet (Norwegian) or Sohkerde (Southern Sami) is a lake in Grane Municipality in Nordland county, Norway. The 2.36-square-kilometre (0.91 sq mi) lake lies between the lakes Majavatnet and Storsvenningvatnet. The European route E6 highway and the Nordland Line railway both run along the eastern edge of the lake.

== See also ==
- List of lakes in Norway
- Geography of Norway
