= Majavatn Church =

Church in Nordland, Norway

- Majavatn kirke
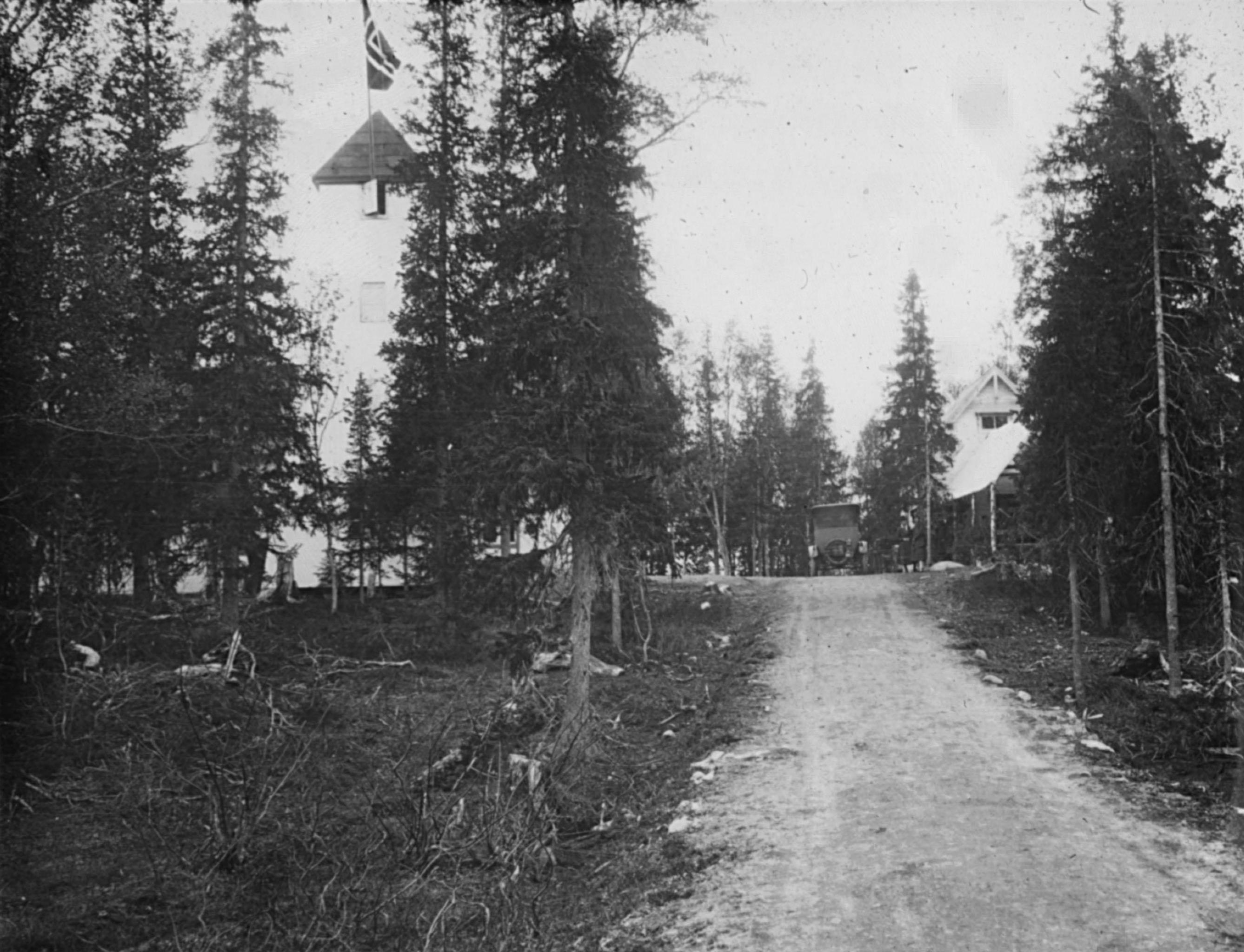
- View of the church
- Majavatn Church
- 65.16738883°N 13.36505323°E
- Location: Grane Municipality, Nordland
- Country: Norway
- Denomination: Church of Norway
- Churchmanship: Evangelical Lutheran

History
- Former name: Majavatn kapell
- Status: Chapel
- Founded: 1915
- Consecrated: 11 June 1924

Architecture
- Functional status: Active
- Architectural type: Long church
- Completed: 1915 (111 years ago)

Specifications
- Capacity: 80
- Materials: Wood

Administration
- Diocese: Sør-Hålogaland
- Deanery: Indre Helgeland prosti
- Parish: Grane

Majavatn Church (Norwegian: Majavatn kirke) is a chapel of the Church of Norway in Grane Municipality in Nordland county, Norway. It is located in the village of Majavatn, about 50 kilometres (31 mi) south of the village of Trofors, just alongside the large lake Majavatnet. It is an annex chapel for the Grane parish which is part of the Indre Helgeland prosti (deanery) in the Diocese of Sør-Hålogaland. The white, wooden chapel was built in a long church style in 1915 as the "Majavatn misjonshus", an initiative of Paul Pedersen of the Norges Samemisjon. The church seats about 80 people. On 11 June 1924, it was consecrate as a "chapel". The chapel holds about 5 scheduled worship services each year, in addition to baptisms, confirmations, weddings, and funerals.

== See also ==
- List of churches in Sør-Hålogaland
