= Gustav Kappfjell =

- Gaebpien Gåsta
- Born: February 12, 1913; Maajehjaevrie, Norway
- Died: May 24, 1999 (aged 86)
- Resting place: Grane Municipality, Norway
- Occupation: Poet
- Writing career
- Language: Southern Sámi; Norwegian; Swedish

Gustav Matheus Kappfjell (12 February 1913 – 24 May 1999), also known by the Southern Sámi form of his name, Gaebpien Gåsta, was a Southern Sámi reindeer herder, hunter, farmer, poet, and joiker from Maajehjaevrie in Grane Municipality, Norway.

== Biography ==
Kappfjell attended the Sámi school in Havika (Namsos) in 1921–22; at that time the state Norwegianization policy forbade students from speaking Sámi languages. During World War II, Kappfjell was witness to the 1942 Majavatn Affair in which 24 Norwegian partisans were arrested in Majavatn and later executed at the Falstad concentration camp. His father, Nils Johan Kappfjell, died on 5 July 1948 in the Duderlands Valley bus accident. After his mother, Anna, died in 1951, Kappfjell took over the family farm, eventually selling his share of the family reindeer herd to invest in the farm. His brother, Nils Olav Kappfjell, continued with reindeer husbandry.

== Poetry ==
As a poet, Kappfjell wrote about Sámi life and identity, blending images of reindeer herding and mountain life with ancestral stories, Southern Sámi history, and customs. He also outlines Sámi struggles with the loss of land, water, and rights. His collection of poems, Gaaltije (1987), was the first literary work published in Southern Sámi. Kappfjell wrote most of his poetry in Southern Sámi, along with some works in Swedish and Norwegian. Previously, Kappfjell published poems in the Saemien Sijte foundation's Åarjel-saemieh yearbook in 1982 and 1985, as well as in the Čallagat (1973) and Vår jord er vårt liv (1981) anthologies. An audio book of his poetry was published for Tråante 2017. Kappfjell was awarded the Grane Kommunes Kulturpris in 1987.
