= Fiplingdal Church =

Church in Nordland, Norway

- Fiplingdal kirke
- Fiplingdal Church
- 65.43316049°N 13.66604939°E
- Location: Grane Municipality, Nordland
- Country: Norway
- Denomination: Church of Norway
- Churchmanship: Evangelical Lutheran

History
- Status: Chapel
- Founded: 1946
- Consecrated: 6 Dec 1964

Architecture
- Functional status: Active
- Architectural type: Long church
- Completed: 1946 (80 years ago)

Specifications
- Capacity: 70
- Materials: Wood

Administration
- Diocese: Sør-Hålogaland
- Deanery: Indre Helgeland prosti
- Parish: Grane
- Norwegian Cultural Heritage Site
- Type: Church
- Status: Not protected
- ID: 84139

Fiplingdal Church (Norwegian: Fiplingdal kirke) is a chapel of the Church of Norway in Grane Municipality in Nordland county, Norway. It is located on the north side of the tiny village of Leiren on the north end of the lake Nedre Fiplingvatnet. It is an annex chapel for the Grane parish which is part of the Indre Helgeland prosti (deanery) in the Diocese of Sør-Hålogaland. The red, wooden church was built in a long church style in 1946 to serve as a mission house. The church seats about 70 people.

The building was consecrated as a "chapel" on 6 December 1964. In 2012, the chapel was renovated and a new bathroom was completed. The chapel holds about 10 worship services there each year in additions to baptisms, confirmations, weddings, and funerals.

== See also ==
- List of churches in Sør-Hålogaland
