= Fiskeløysvatnet =

Fiskeløysvatnet is the name of several lakes in Norway including:

- Fiskeløysvatnet (Bjerkreim), a lake in Bjerkreim, Rogaland county
- Fiskeløysvatnet (Fyresdal), a lake in Fyresdal, Telemark county
- Fiskeløysvatnet (Narvik), a lake in Narvik, Nordland county
- Fiskeløysvatnet (Saltdal), a lake in Saltdal, Nordland county
- Fiskeløysvatnet (Sør-Varanger), a lake in Sør-Varanger, Finnmark county
- Fiskeløysvatnet (Valle), a lake in Valle, Aust-Agder county
- Fiskelausvatnet (Grane)
