= Leiren =

Village in Grane Municipality, Norway

Leiren Leira
- Village
- Interactive map of Leiren
- Location within Nordland Location within Norway
- Coordinates: 65.4250°N 13.6607°E
- Country: Norway
- Region: Northern Norway
- County: Nordland
- District: Helgeland
- Municipality: Grane Municipality
- Elevation: 371 m (1,217 ft)
- Time zone: UTC+01:00 (CET)
  - Summer (DST): UTC+02:00 (CEST)
- Post Code: 8680 Trofors

Leiren is a village in Grane Municipality in Nordland county, Norway. The village is located at the northern end of the lake Nedre Fiplingvatnet. The municipal center of Trofors lies about 25 kilometres (16 mi) to the northwest and the village of Majavatn lies about 30 kilometres (19 mi) to the south. The local Fiplingdal Church is located in Leiren, serving the eastern part of Grane.
