= Fiskelausvatnet (Grane) =

Lake in Grane, Norway

Fiskelausvatnet (Norwegian) Guelehtsjaevrie (Southern Sami)
- Interactive map of the lake
- Location: Grane Municipality, Nordland
- Coordinates: 65.6403°N 13.5822°E
- Basin countries: Norway
- Max. length: 2.6 kilometres (1.6 mi)
- Max. width: 2.3 kilometres (1.4 mi)
- Surface area: 2.83 km^{2} (1.09 sq mi)
- Shore length^{1}: 10.62 kilometres (6.60 mi)
- Surface elevation: 486 metres (1,594 ft)
- References: NVE
- ^{1} Shore length is not a well-defined measure.

Fiskelausvatnet (Norwegian) or Guelehtsjaevrie (Southern Sami) is a lake in Grane Municipality in Nordland county, Norway. The lake lies in the northern part of the municipality, about 13 kilometres (8.1 mi) northeast of Trofors. The name of the lake translates as "fishless lake".

== See also ==
- List of lakes in Norway
- Geography of Norway
