= Majavatn Affair =

WWII resistance crackdown in Norway

Majavatn Affair (Bokmål: Majavatnaffæren), also known as the Majavatn Tragedy (Majavatntragedien), was a German crackdown on the Norwegian resistance movement in the Helgeland region of occupied Norway during the Second World War. The affair culminated in arrests and executions following resistance activities connected to Operation Jupiter in 1942.

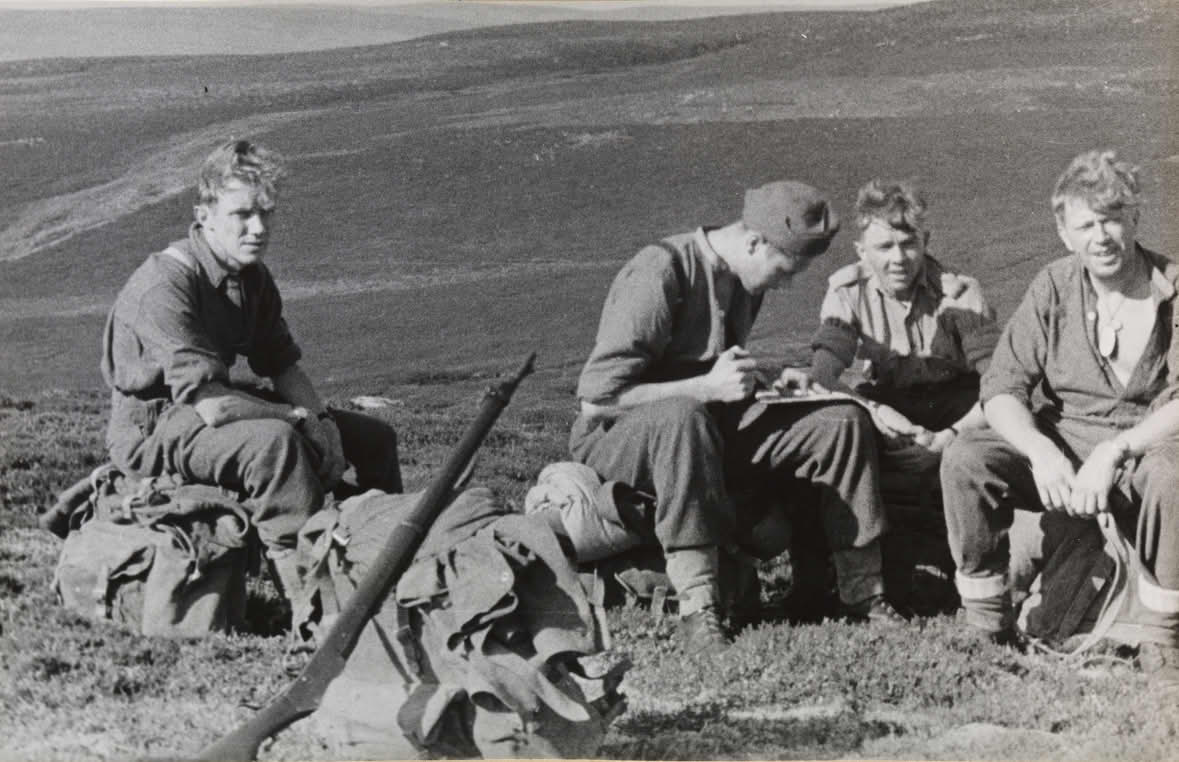
Norwegian resistance members connected to operations in Helgeland during the Second World War.

== Background ==
Resistance groups in Helgeland cooperated with agents and supply operations connected to the United Kingdom during the German occupation of Norway. Weapons and equipment were transported into the region through networks associated with the Shetland Bus and Operation Jupiter.

Captain Birger E. Sjøberg, operating under the alias Nils Berdahl, organized expeditions to Helgeland to establish contact with local resistance groups and deliver weapons and supplies from the United Kingdom.

Weapons and equipment were transported across the mountains into the districts of Grane and Vefsn.

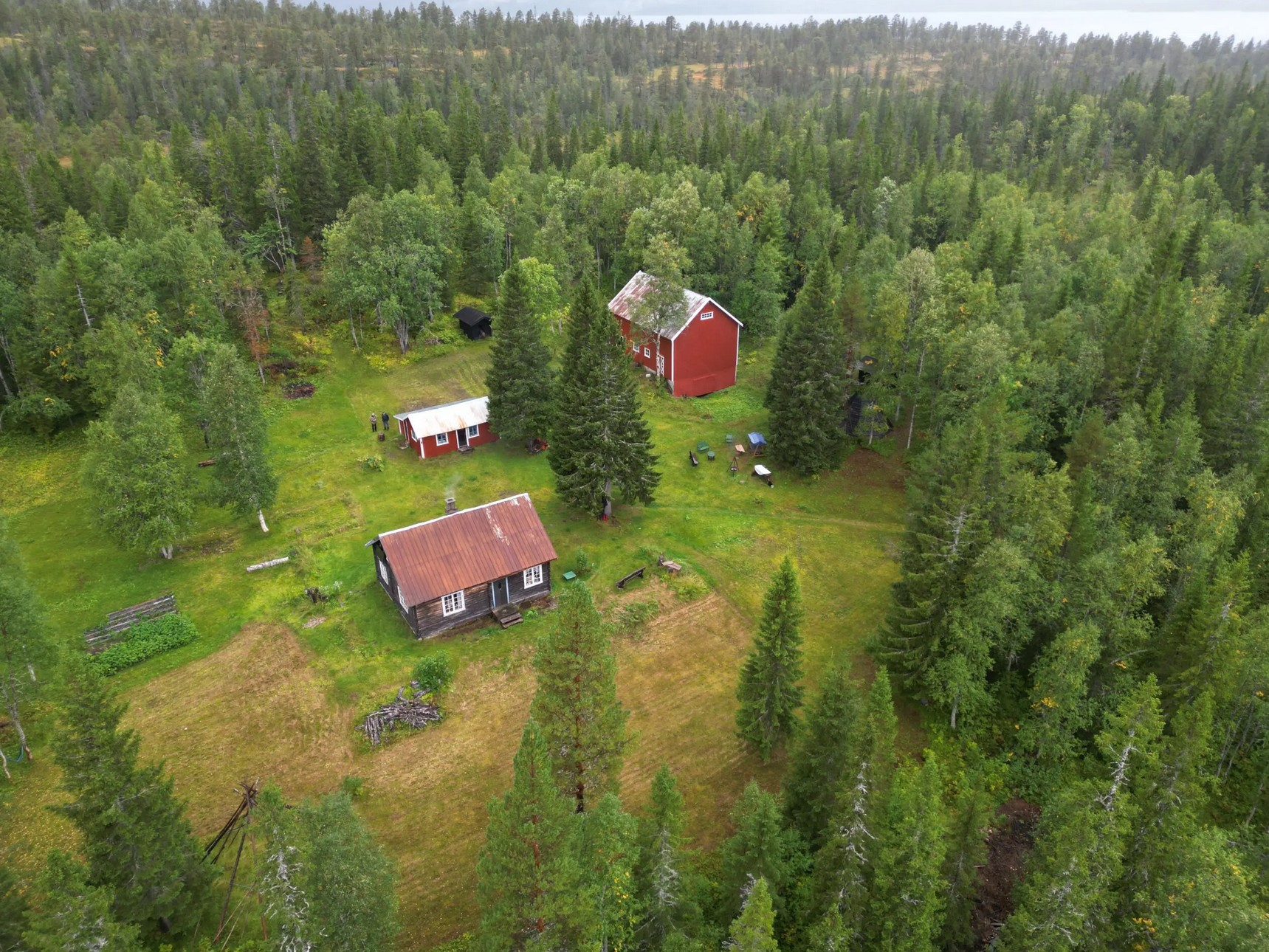
Tangen farm in Majavatn, where clashes connected to the affair took place in 1942.

== Crackdown and executions ==
In 1942, the German Gestapo uncovered parts of the resistance network operating in Helgeland.

German authorities arrested a telegraph operator connected to the resistance network, leading them to Tangen farm in Majavatn, where resistance members had been storing weapons and equipment.

Resistance members became aware of the approaching German forces and clashes occurred at the farm during the operation. Several resistance members escaped through the surrounding mountain areas, and some later reached neutral Sweden.

The situation culminated during clashes at Tangen farm in Majavatn in the autumn of 1942. Following the operation, German authorities arrested resistance members from Grane, Vefsn, Vevelstad, and the Trondheim area.

After summary trials, 24 men were executed at Falstad concentration camp on 8 and 9 October 1942.
