= Château de Grâne =

Castle ruin in southeastern France

Coordinates: 44°43′56″N 4°55′21″E

The Château de Grâne is a ruined castle in the commune of Grâne in the Drôme département of France.

The castle stands above the village of Grâne and is largely in ruins. Remains include sections of the curtain wall and a tower. The mounting for an old mullioned window and a spiral staircase are visible, as well as vaulted cellars from the 13th century.

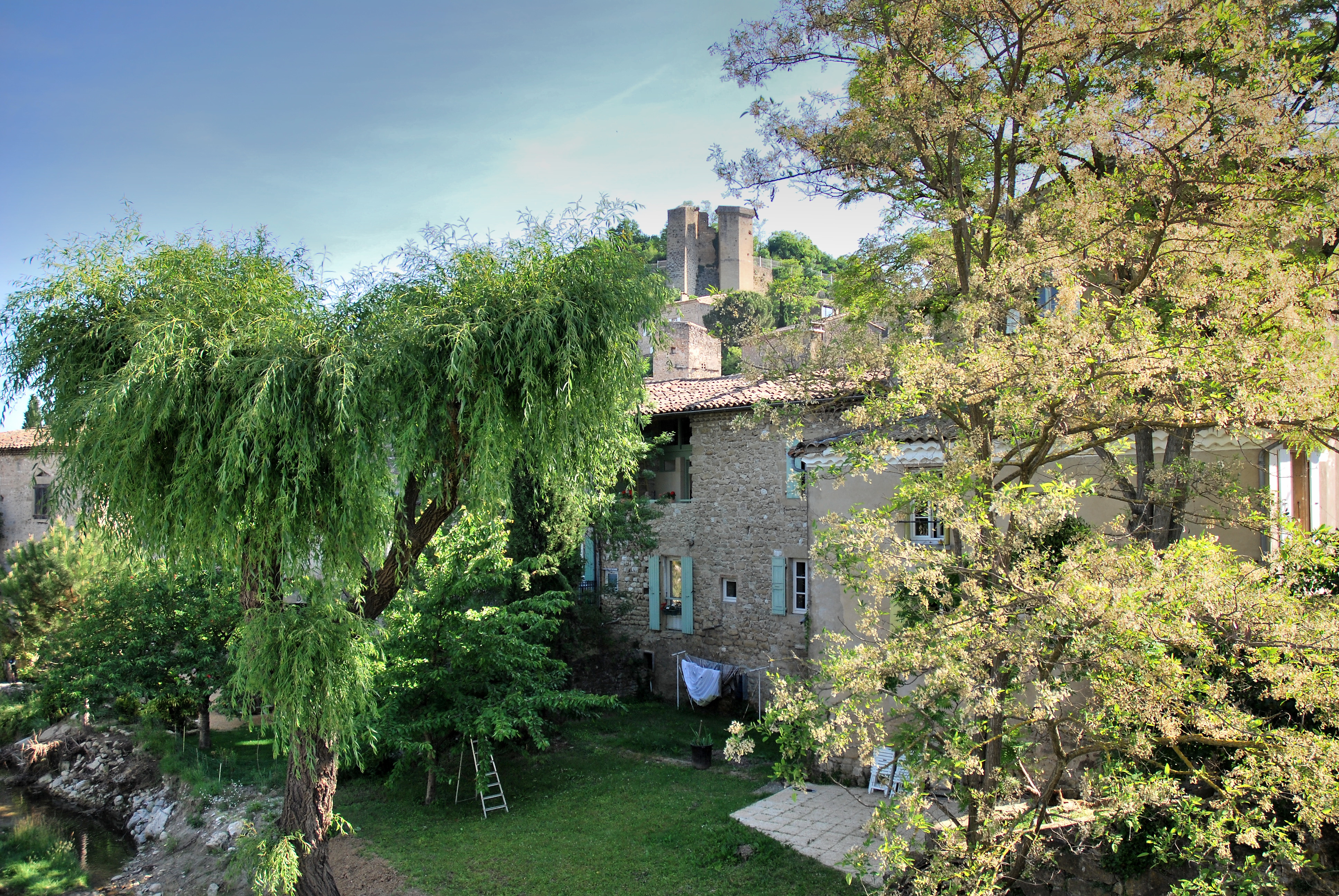
view of Grâne Castle towers

== History ==
Grâne's castle was one of the preferred dwellings of the Counts of Poitiers, who stored their archives and treasures there. The last Count of Poitiers, Louis II, having no legitimate male heir, was taken hostage at Grâne's castle for 15 days on 2 August 1416 by his cousins, Charles, the lord of Saint-Vallier, Drôme and the Bishop of Valence, Jean de Poitiers. They forced him to sign a will in their favour. Once freed, the old count tried to annul the will by remarrying but failed to have any children. The Pope finally revoked the testament, signed under duress.

The Domaine de Plaisance, comprising the castle in the village, as well as agricultural lands and a fortified house (maison fort), was created at the start of the 16th century by Bertrand Rabot, a Noble of the Robe. During the Wars of Religion (1562–98), the castle and particularly the maison fort were badly damaged. The Rabots returned in 1644 and renovated the buildings

In 1792, Duchesne, a lawyer from Grenoble, bought the castle and estate. He was later a delegate under the Directory and president of the Tribunat under the Consulate.

The castle, as part of the Domaine de Plaisance, has been listed since 1999 as a monument historique by the French Ministry of Culture.

== See also ==
- List of castles in France
