= Grane, Drôme =

Grane
- Commune
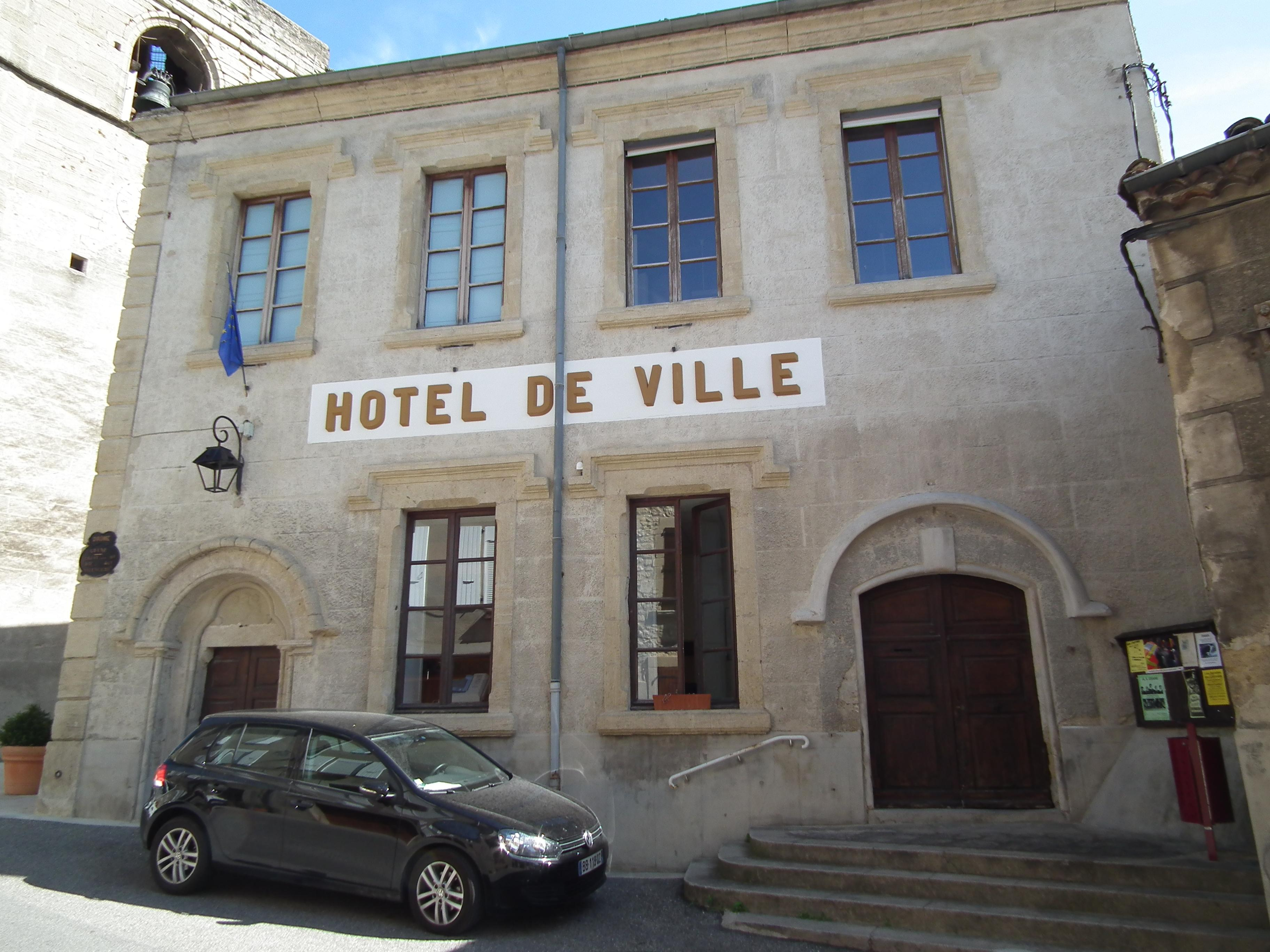
- The town hall of Grane
- Location of Grane
- Location within France Location within Auvergne-Rhône-Alpes
- Coordinates: 44°43′56″N 4°55′21″E
- Country: France
- Region: Auvergne-Rhône-Alpes
- Department: Drôme
- Arrondissement: Die
- Canton: Crest
- Intercommunality: Val de Drôme en Biovallée

Government
  - Mayor (2020–2026): Jean-Paul Xatard
- Area^{1}: 44.84 km^{2} (17.31 sq mi)
- Highest elevation: 505 m (1,657 ft)
- Lowest elevation: 113 m (371 ft)
- Population (2023): 2,204
  - Density: 49.15/km^{2} (127.3/sq mi)
- Time zone: UTC+01:00 (CET)
  - Summer (DST): UTC+02:00 (CEST)
- INSEE/Postal code: 26144 /26400
- ^{1} French Land Register data, which excludes lakes, ponds, glaciers > 1 km^{2} (0.386 sq mi or 247 acres) and river estuaries.

Grane (French pronunciation: [ɡʁan], also Grâne; Occitan: Grana) is a commune in the Drôme département in southeastern France.

== Population ==
Historical population
| Year | Pop. | ±% p.a. |
|---|---|---|
| 1968 | 1,125 | — |
| 1975 | 1,011 | −1.51% |
| 1982 | 1,183 | +2.27% |
| 1990 | 1,384 | +1.98% |
| 1999 | 1,567 | +1.39% |
| 2007 | 1,694 | +0.98% |
| 2012 | 1,792 | +1.13% |
| 2017 | 1,913 | +1.32% |
| 2023 | 2,204 | +2.39% |
Source: INSEE

== See also ==
- Château de Grâne, ruined castle in the village
- Communes of the Drôme department
