= Gåsvatnet =

Lake in Grane, Norway

Gåsvatnet (Norwegian) Sarvejællanjaevrie (Southern Sami)
- Interactive map of the lake
- Location: Grane Municipality, Nordland
- Coordinates: 65.3524°N 13.2382°E
- Basin countries: Norway
- Max. length: 3.3 kilometres (2.1 mi)
- Max. width: 1.4 kilometres (0.87 mi)
- Surface area: 2.32 km^{2} (0.90 sq mi)
- Shore length^{1}: 14.6 kilometres (9.1 mi)
- Surface elevation: 323 metres (1,060 ft)
- References: NVE
- ^{1} Shore length is not a well-defined measure.

Gåsvatnet (Norwegian) or Sarvejællanjaevrie (Southern Sami) is a lake in Grane Municipality in Nordland county, Norway. The 2.32 km^{2} (0.90 sq mi) lake lies in the southeastern part of Lomsdal–Visten National Park, just north of Norwegian National Road 73.

== See also ==
- List of lakes in Norway
- Geography of Norway
