= Grane Church =

Church in Nordland, Norway

- Grane kirke
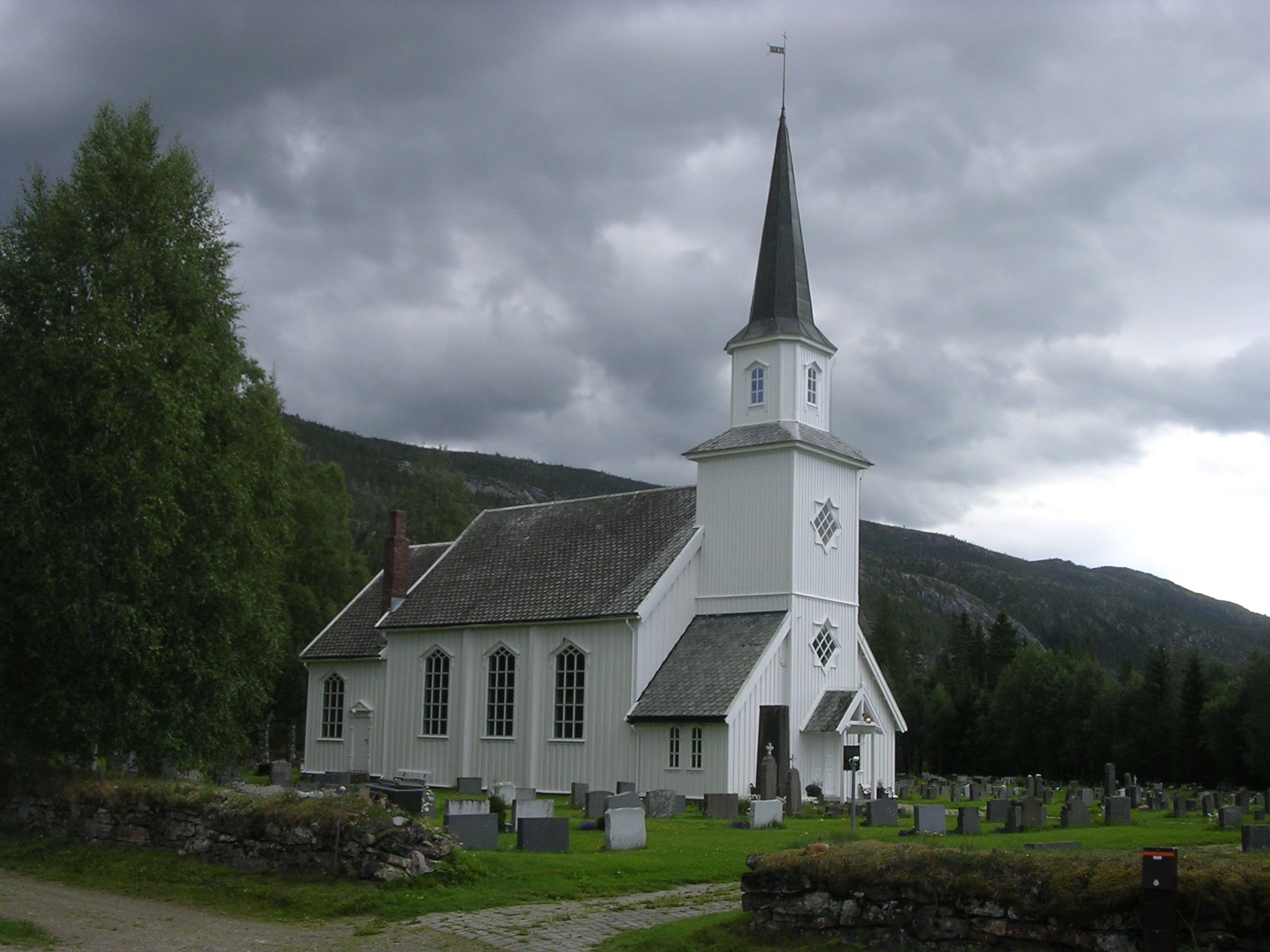
- View of the church
- Grane Church
- 65.58311625°N 13.3966577°E
- Location: Grane Municipality, Nordland
- Country: Norway
- Denomination: Church of Norway
- Churchmanship: Evangelical Lutheran

History
- Status: Parish church
- Founded: 1860
- Consecrated: 22 July 1860

Architecture
- Functional status: Active
- Architect(s): Andreas Grenstad and Andreas Nilsskog
- Architectural type: Long church
- Completed: 1860 (166 years ago)

Specifications
- Capacity: 230
- Materials: Wood

Administration
- Diocese: Sør-Hålogaland
- Deanery: Indre Helgeland prosti
- Parish: Grane
- Norwegian Cultural Heritage Site
- Type: Church
- Status: Not protected
- ID: 84276

Grane Church (Norwegian: Grane kirke) is a parish church of the Church of Norway in Grane Municipality in Nordland county, Norway. It is located in the village of Grane, about 8 kilometres (5.0 mi) north of the municipal center of Trofors. The church sits along the European route E06 highway, just 250 metres (820 ft) from the river Vefsna. It is the main church for the Grane parish which is part of the Indre Helgeland prosti (deanery) in the Diocese of Sør-Hålogaland. The white, wooden church was built in a long church style in 1860 using plans drawn up by the architects Andreas Grendestad and Andreas Nilsskog. The church seats about 230 people. The church was consecrated on 22 July 1860. A new service building was constructed near the church in 1999, and it is used for church offices. The church typically holds worship services about 20 times per year.

== Media gallery ==
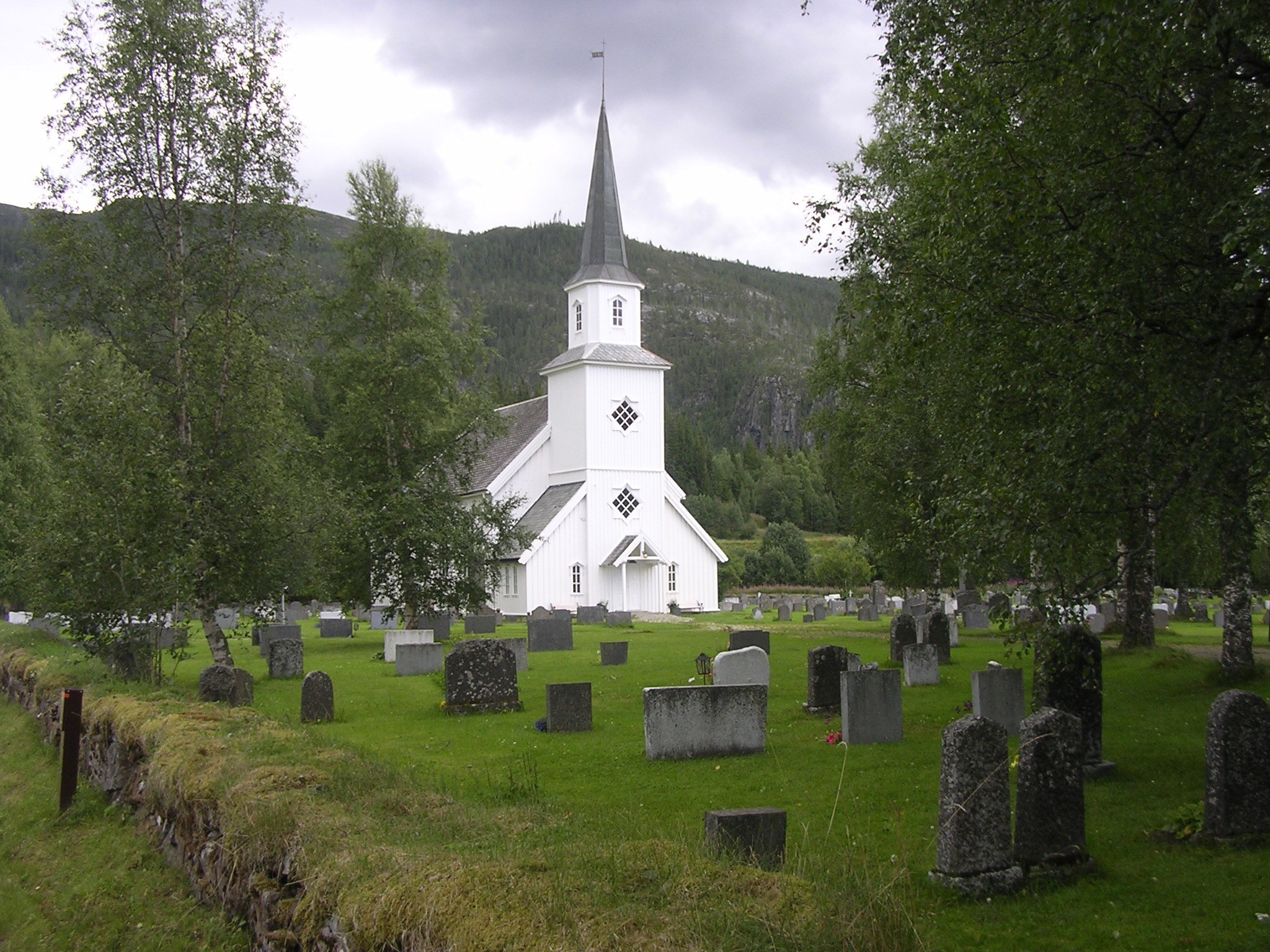
Exterior view

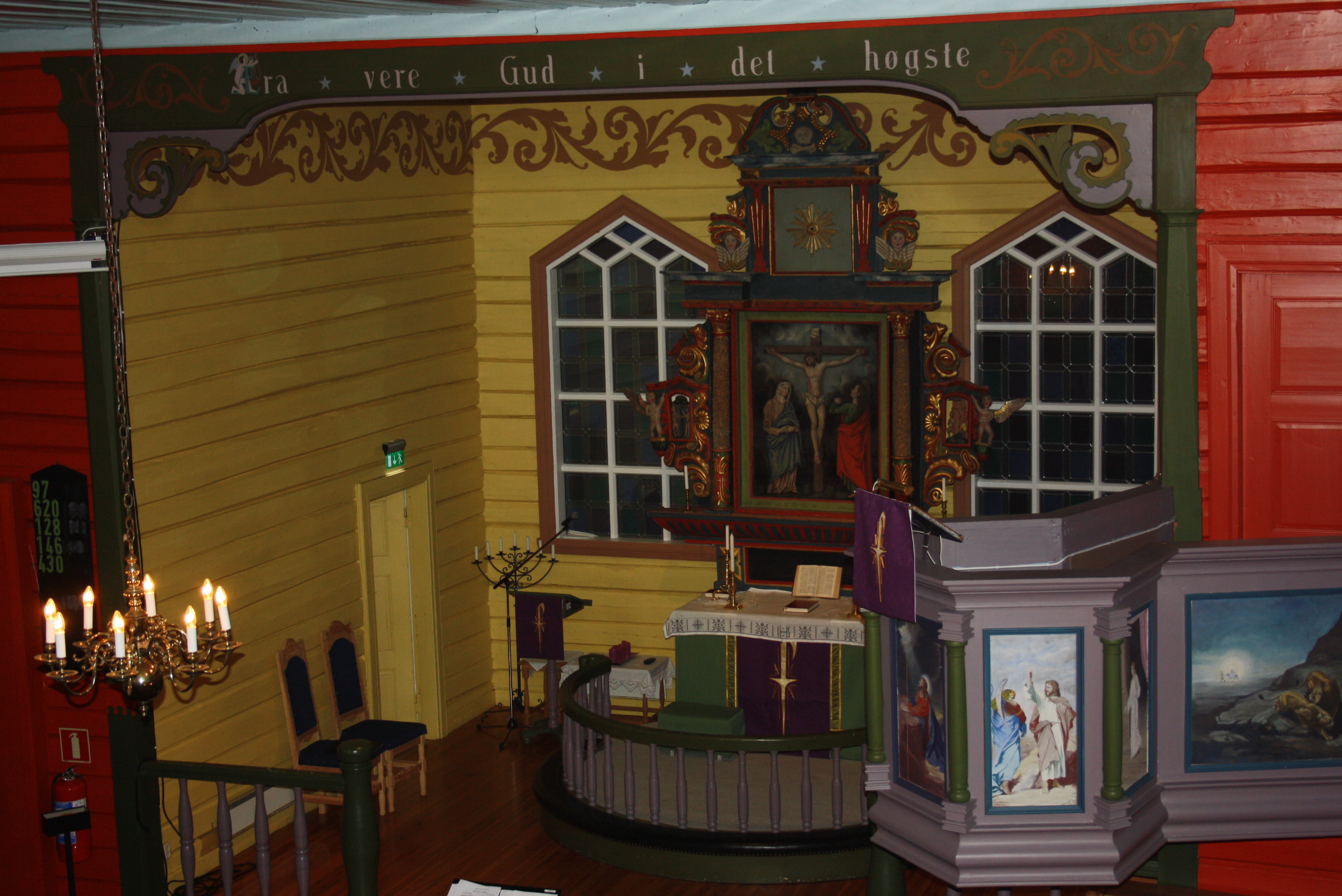
Altar

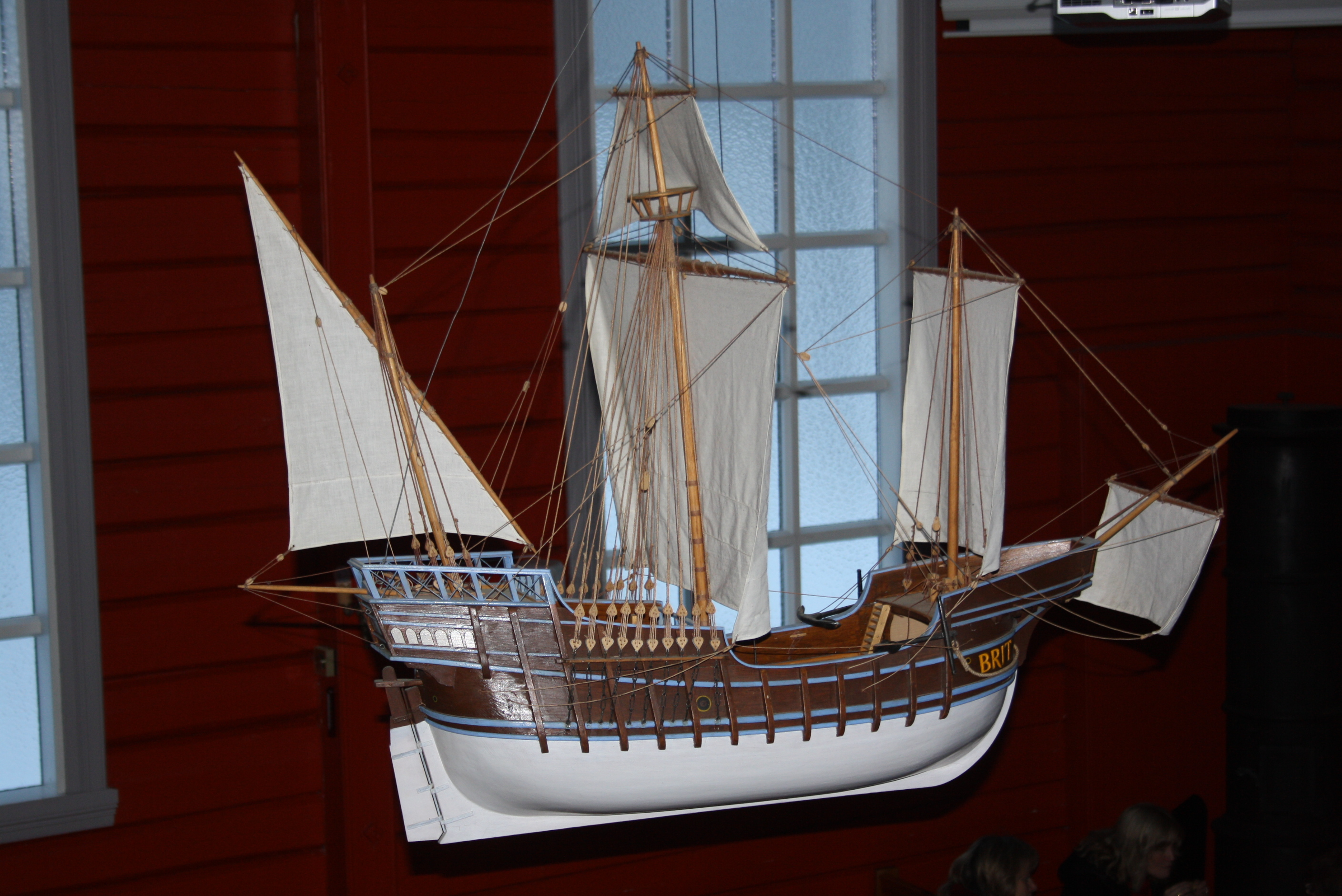
Interior decoration

== See also ==
- List of churches in Sør-Hålogaland
