= Grane, Nordland =

Village in Grane Municipality, Norway

Grane, Nordland: Grane (Norwegian); Gaala (Southern Sami)
- Village
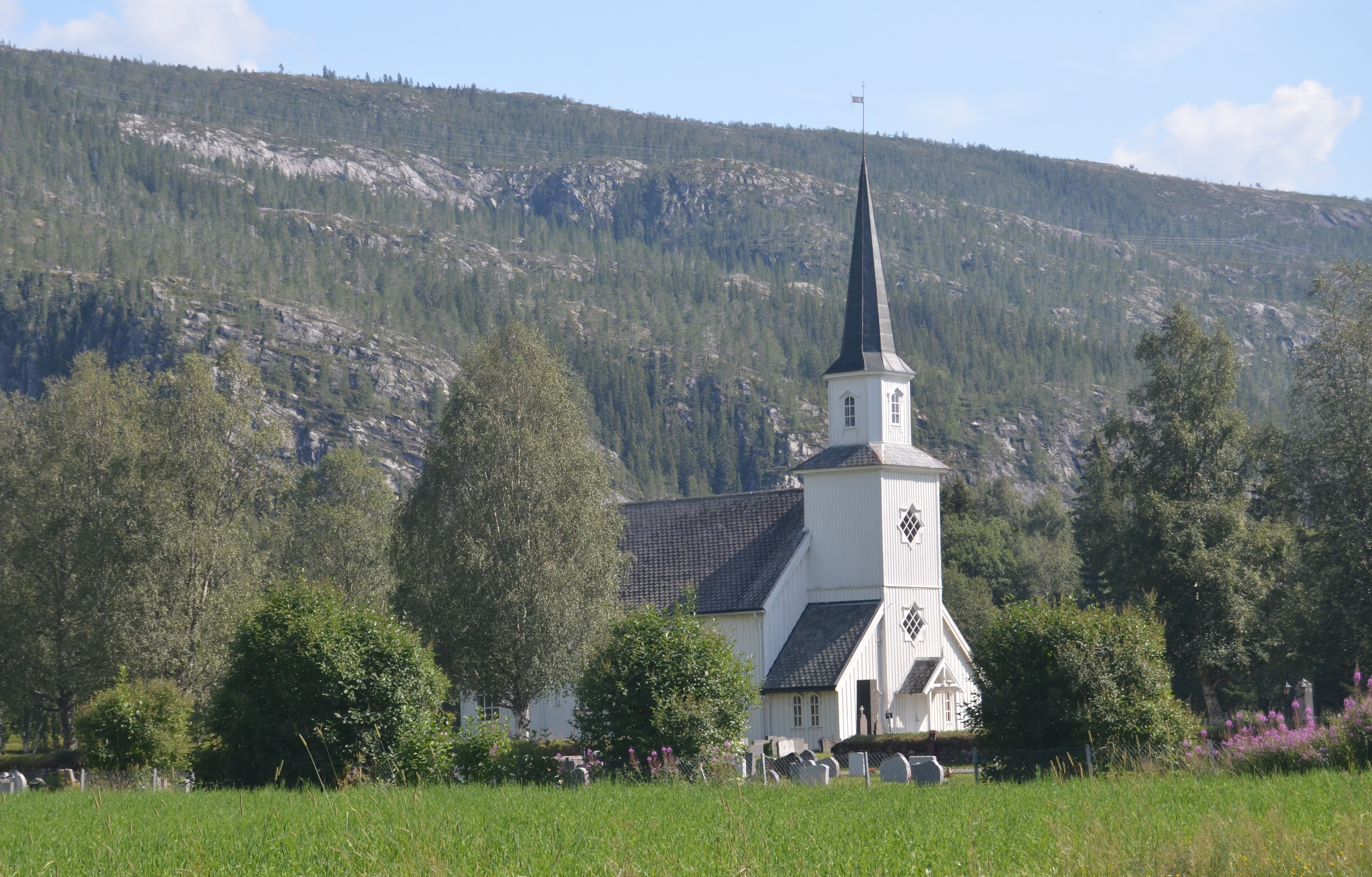
- View of the village church
- Interactive map of Grane, Nordland
- Location within Nordland Location within Norway
- Coordinates: 65.58641°N 13.39313°E
- Country: Norway
- Region: Northern Norway
- County: Nordland
- District: Helgeland
- Municipality: Grane Municipality
- Elevation: 67 m (220 ft)
- Time zone: UTC+01:00 (CET)
  - Summer (DST): UTC+02:00 (CEST)
- Post Code: 8684 Trofors

Grane (Norwegian) or Gaala (Southern Sami) is a village in Grane Municipality in Nordland county, Norway. The village is located along the river Vefsna, about 6 kilometres (3.7 mi) north of the village of Trofors, the municipal centre.

The European route E6 highway and the Nordland Line railway both pass by on the west side of the village. Grane Church is located in the village.
