= Majavatn =

Village in Grane Municipality, Norway

Majavatn: Majavatn (Norwegian); Maajehjaevrie (Southern Sami)
- Village
- Interactive map of Majavatn
- Location within Nordland Location within Norway
- Coordinates: 65.1676°N 13.3691°E
- Country: Norway
- Region: Northern Norway
- County: Nordland
- District: Helgeland
- Municipality: Grane Municipality
- Elevation: 321 m (1,053 ft)
- Time zone: UTC+01:00 (CET)
  - Summer (DST): UTC+02:00 (CEST)
- Post Code: 8680 Trofors

Majavatn (Norwegian) or Maajehjaevrie (Southern Sami) is a village in Grane Municipality in Nordland county, Norway. It is located on the eastern shore of the lake Majavatnet, just west of the boundary of Børgefjell National Park. The village of Leiren lies about 30 kilometres (19 mi) to the northeast and the municipal center of Trofors lies about 45 kilometres (28 mi) to the north.

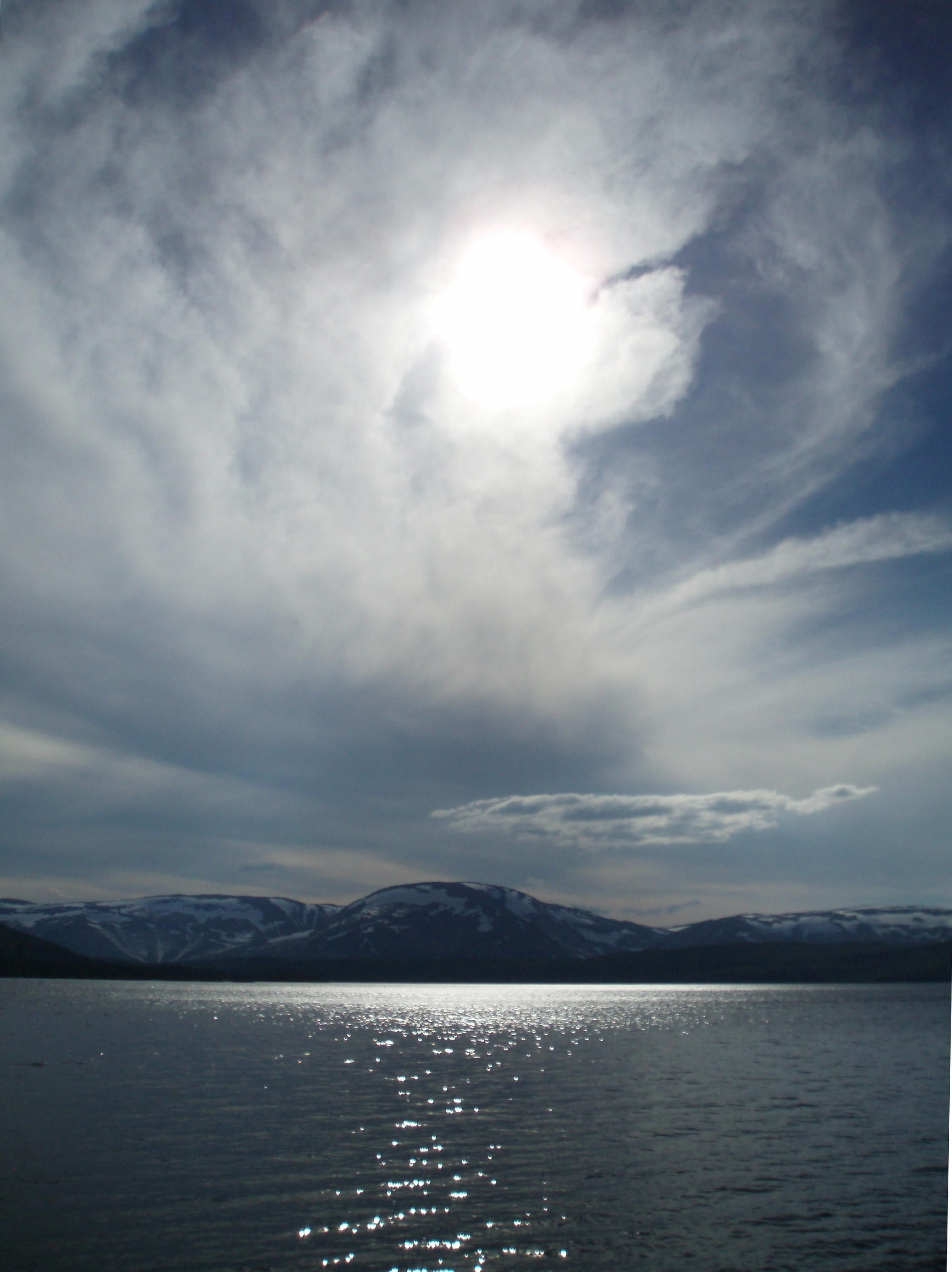
View of the lake near the village

Both European route E6 highway and the Nordland Line railway pass through the village of Majavatn. Majavatn Station is the local railway station. It lies 321.74 kilometres (199.92 mi) from Trondheim Central Station and it sits at an elevation of 319.9 metres (1,050 ft) above sea level. Majavatn Church is located in the village and serves the southern part of the municipality.

Southern Sami reindeer herders drive their reindeer through the area around Majavatn.

During the Second World War there were confrontations between Germans and Norwegian citizens at Tangen farm. Many of the Norwegians involved were later executed by the Germans at Falstad concentration camp in 1942. These events were later known as the Majavatn Affair.
