= Grane Municipality =

Municipality in Nordland, Norway

Grane Municipality Grane kommune Gaaloe
- Municipality
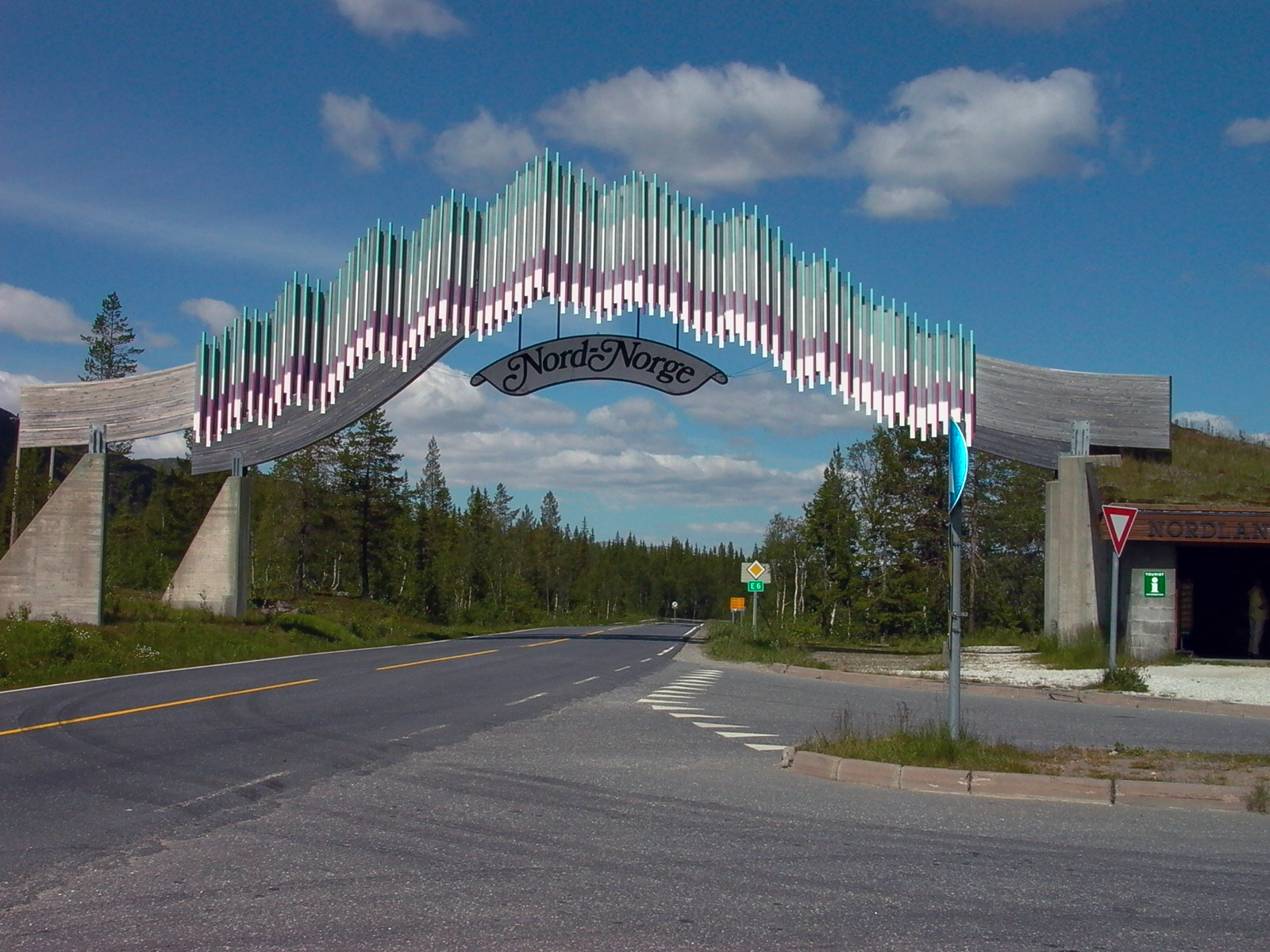
- The entrance to North Norway on the E6 highway in southern Grane

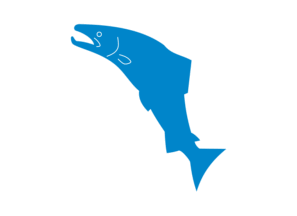
- Flag Coat of arms

- Nordland within Norway

- Grane within Nordland
- Coordinates: 65°24′02″N 13°30′38″E
- Country: Norway
- County: Nordland
- District: Helgeland
- Established: 1 July 1927
  - Preceded by: Vefsn Municipality
- Administrative centre: Trofors

Government
  - Mayor (2023): Raymond Fagerli (Sp)

Area
  - Total: 2,004.11 km^{2} (773.79 sq mi)
  - Land: 1,881.43 km^{2} (726.42 sq mi)
  - Water: 122.68 km^{2} (47.37 sq mi) 6.1%
  - Rank: #37 in Norway
- Highest elevation: 1,696.46 m (5,565.8 ft)

Population (2024)
  - Total: 1,447
  - Rank: #304 in Norway
  - Density: 0.7/km^{2} (1.8/sq mi)
  - Change (10 years): ▼ −1.2%
- Demonym: Graneværing

Official language
  - Norwegian form: Neutral
- Time zone: UTC+01:00 (CET)
  - Summer (DST): UTC+02:00 (CEST)
- ISO 3166 code: NO-1825
- Website: Official website

Grane is a municipality in Nordland county, Norway. It is part of the Helgeland traditional region. The administrative centre of the municipality is the village of Trofors. There are several other villages in the municipality including Fallmoen, Grane, Leiren, Majavatn, and Strendene. The European route E6 highway and the Nordland Line railway both run through the municipality from south to north.

The 2,004-square-kilometre (774 sq mi) municipality is the 37th largest by area out of the 357 municipalities in Norway. Grane Municipality is the 304th most populous municipality in Norway with a population of 1,447. The municipality's population density is 0.7 inhabitants per square kilometre (1.8/sq mi) and its population has decreased by 1.2% over the previous 10-year period.

== General information ==
The municipality of Grane was established on 1 July 1927 when it was separated from the large Vefsn Municipality. Initially, Grane Municipality had 1,746 residents. The municipal boundaries have not changed since then.

=== Name ===
The municipality (originally the parish) is named after the old Grane farm (spelled "Grane" in 1661), since the first Grane Church was built there in 1860. The name Grane is pronounced with a long a and short n, which is not palatalized. It is seemingly a simple and plain name, but many questions arise regarding both valid meanings for the word and the spoken forms it takes. The spoken form is most peculiar. It is distinct from other genuine old farm names in the area in that it is uninflected, with no definite form and consequently no distinct case (neither dative nor genitive). It is said short and crisp, regardless of what speech context it is found in.

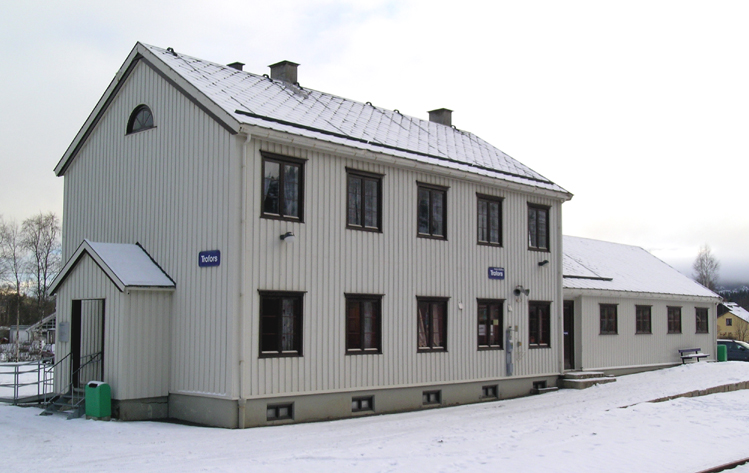
Trofors railway station on the Nordland Line, Grane

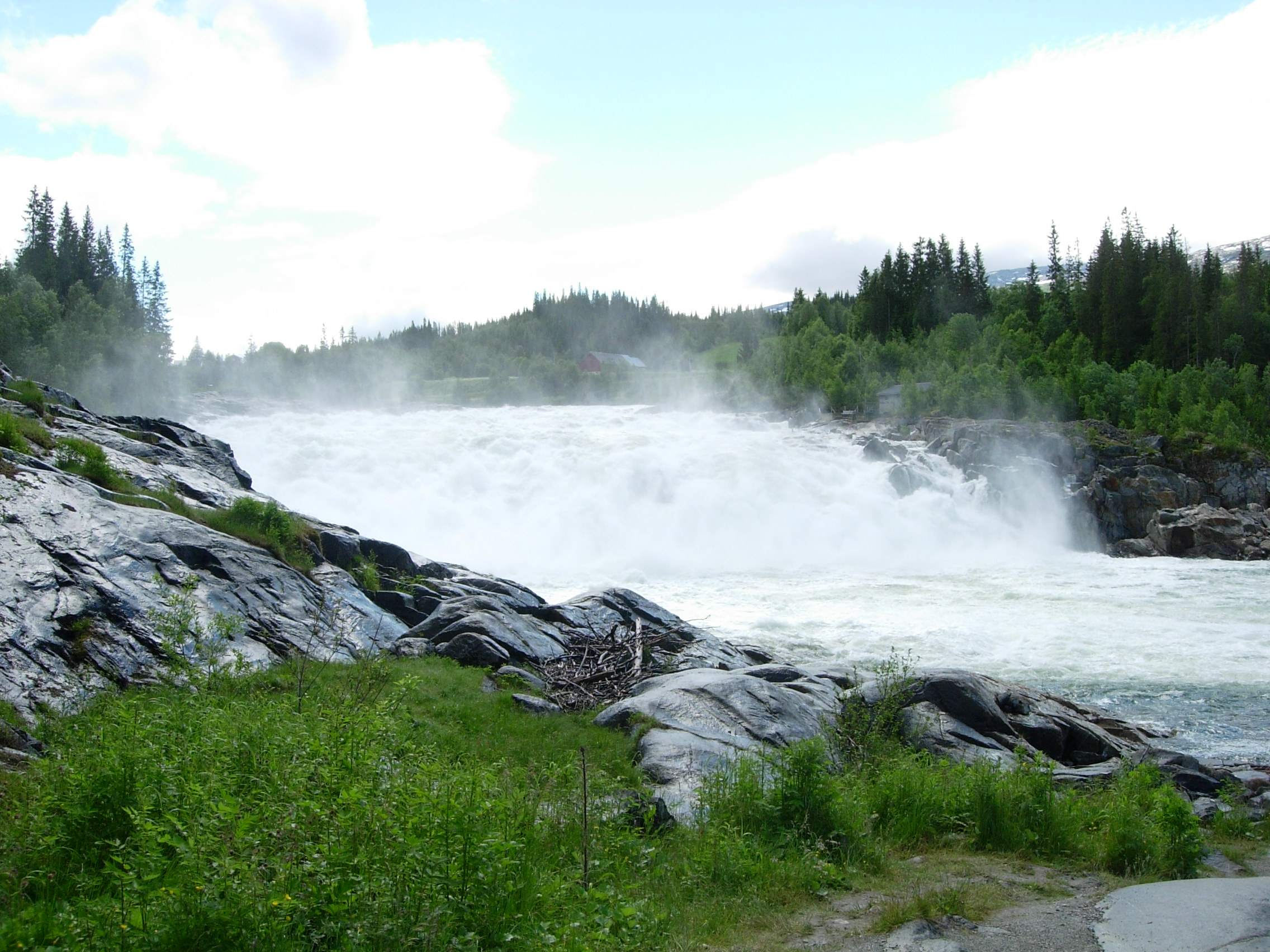
Laksforsen, Vefsna river.

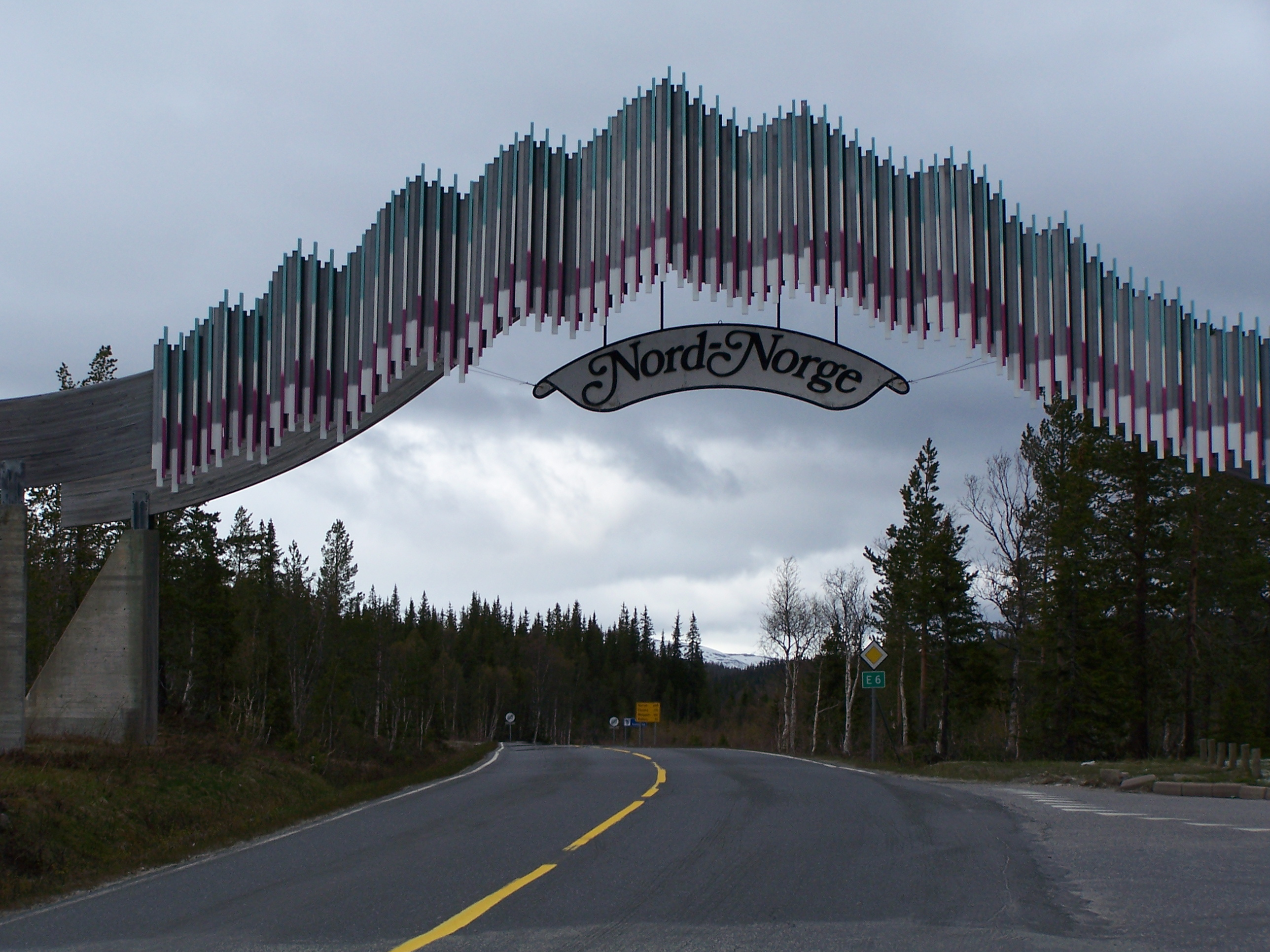
The portal at "The gate to North Norway" tourist information center. European route E6 passes thru the portal.

It seems to be a farm name with a grammatical form presuming a standard only found among farms cleared in the Middle Ages, and likely around the 12th century. But the Grane farm was not cleared before the mid-17th century and there is nothing to suggest a prior settlement. Thus we find a basic disparity without any easy explanation. Farm names sometimes follow environmental descriptions given in the vernacular of the time, but it is quite difficult to see what environmental aspect would yield the name form of "Grane" in the speech of the 17th century.

One possible explanation is that those who cleared the farm around 1650 simply borrowed the name from another known place in the country. It is not doubtful that those who cleared the farm came from Åneset in what is now Vefsn Municipality. But this does not preclude the notion that the name may have its roots elsewhere. Sagas say it stems from Jämtland (Sweden). In Nord-Trøndelag there are three settlements for which one finds the farm name "Gran" (of course pronounced without the final 'e'). Outside the northern regions, the farm name is found only in Askvoll Municipality in Western Norway. The name of that farm is also written Grane, and the pronunciation ([gra:nə]) is exactly the same. But it is rather insensible that the name could have been borrowed from there.

Therefore, if the name actually is a local development in the Old Norse speech forms of the Middle Ages—there was surely quite a significant farm settlement in the central valleys of Vefsn before the Bubonic plague—it was unlikely to have been used as the name for a farm. Rather it would have had to have been so well entrenched in its ancient speech form that it held over from the times of pestilence and Black Death when settlers were reduced to meager numbers. This is possible, but still mere conjecture.

In the matter of the name's valid meaning, it is obvious to assume that it has its origins in the tree name grǫn which means "spruce". This should designate a place where spruces grow. This is an unlikely explanation for a name with local origins in the Middle Ages and makes little sense. Even though many spruces currently grow in that vicinity, recent pollen studies show that spruce forests came surprisingly late to that stretch of land. They were not present before the 13th to 14th centuries and it took several hundred years after that for spruce forest to proliferate in the Ner-Vefsn and Majavatnet settlements. Spruce trees were not likely characteristic of the Grane area in the Middle Ages.

Researchers into municipal naming practices have concluded that the stem 'gran', found in a series of names nationwide, cannot have its source in the environmental connection to spruce timber. At the root is certainly an Old Norse word which must have denoted something 'sharp', and which is now extant in only a few Norse dialects with traditional meanings. Used in a place name, the stem would probably signify 'something which protrudes up from the landscape.'

Another theory is that the name derives from the Southern Sámi word kråane, which means 'corner' or 'crook', referring to the bending and curving of the Vefsna river in the area. This is also the point where the river flowing westward from Hattfjelldal changes direction and turns north towards the Vefsnfjord.

=== Coat of arms ===
The coat of arms was granted on 18 July 1980. The official blazon is "Argent, a salmon haurient azure" (Norwegian: På sølv bunn en springende blå laks). This means the arms have a field (background) that has a tincture of argent which means it is commonly colored white, but if it is made out of metal, then silver is used. The charge is a leaping salmon. This was chosen as a symbol of the rich salmon rivers Vefsna and Svenningelva that run through the municipality. There are many small waterfalls where jumping salmon can be observed in the summer. The arms were designed by P. Lakfors.

=== Churches ===
The Church of Norway has one parish (sokn) within Grane Municipality. It is part of the Indre Helgeland prosti (deanery) in the Diocese of Sør-Hålogaland.

Churches in Grane Municipality
Parish (sokn)	Church name	Location of the church	Year built
Grane	Grane Church	Grane	1860
Grane	Fiplingdal Church	Leiren	1915
Grane	Majavatn Church	Majavatn	1946

== Geography ==
The municipality is located in the southern part of Nordland county, along the border with Trøndelag county. Grane includes many lakes including Fiskelausvatnet, Gåsvatnet, Jengelvatnet, Majavatnet, Mellingsvatnet, Nedre Fiplingvatnet, Sefrivatnet, and Storsvenningvatnet. The main river Vefsna also runs through the valley. There are two national parks that are partially located in Grane: Børgefjell National Park and Lomsdal–Visten National Park. The highest point in the municipality is the 1,696.46-metre (5,565.8 ft) tall mountain Kvigtinden.

== Government ==
Grane Municipality is responsible for primary education (through 10th grade), outpatient health services, senior citizen services, welfare and other social services, zoning, economic development, and municipal roads and utilities. The municipality is governed by a municipal council of directly elected representatives. The mayor is indirectly elected by a vote of the municipal council. The municipality is under the jurisdiction of the Helgeland District Court and the Hålogaland Court of Appeal.

=== Municipal council ===
The municipal council (Kommunestyre) of Grane Municipality is made up of 17 representatives that are elected to four year terms. The tables below show the current and historical composition of the council by political party.

Grane kommunestyre 2023–2027
Party name (in Norwegian)	Number of representatives
Labour Party (Arbeiderpartiet)	7
Centre Party (Senterpartiet)	10
Total number of members:	17

Grane kommunestyre 2019–2023
Party name (in Norwegian)	Number of representatives
Labour Party (Arbeiderpartiet)	7
Centre Party (Senterpartiet)	10
Total number of members:	17

Grane kommunestyre 2015–2019
Party name (in Norwegian)	Number of representatives
Labour Party (Arbeiderpartiet)	9
Progress Party (Fremskrittspartiet)	1
Centre Party (Senterpartiet)	7
Total number of members:	17

Grane kommunestyre 2011–2015
Party name (in Norwegian)	Number of representatives
Labour Party (Arbeiderpartiet)	9
Progress Party (Fremskrittspartiet)	2
Centre Party (Senterpartiet)	6
Total number of members:	17

Grane kommunestyre 2007–2011
Party name (in Norwegian)	Number of representatives
Labour Party (Arbeiderpartiet)	9
Progress Party (Fremskrittspartiet)	2
Joint list of the Centre Party and a local political list (Senterpartiet og bygdepolitisk liste)	6
Total number of members:	17

Grane kommunestyre 2003–2007
Party name (in Norwegian)	Number of representatives
Labour Party (Arbeiderpartiet)	11
Joint list of the Centre Party and a local political list (Senterpartiet og bygdepolitisk liste)	6
Total number of members:	17

Grane kommunestyre 1999–2003
Party name (in Norwegian)	Number of representatives
Labour Party (Arbeiderpartiet)	8
Joint list of the Centre Party and a local political list (Senterpartiet og bygdepolitisk liste)	9
Total number of members:	17

Grane kommunestyre 1995–1999
Party name (in Norwegian)	Number of representatives
Labour Party (Arbeiderpartiet)	9
Centre Party (Senterpartiet)	4
Socialist Left Party (Sosialistisk Venstreparti)	1
Joint list of the Communist Party and independent socialists (Norges Kommunistiske Parti og uavhengige sosialister)	1
Local list (Bygdepolitisk liste)	2
Total number of members:	17

Grane kommunestyre 1991–1995
Party name (in Norwegian)	Number of representatives
Labour Party (Arbeiderpartiet)	9
Conservative Party (Høyre)	1
Centre Party (Senterpartiet)	4
Socialist Left Party (Sosialistisk Venstreparti)	2
Cross-party list (Tverrpolitisk liste)	1
Total number of members:	17

Grane kommunestyre 1987–1991
Party name (in Norwegian)	Number of representatives
Labour Party (Arbeiderpartiet)	10
Conservative Party (Høyre)	1
Socialist Left Party (Sosialistisk Venstreparti)	1
Joint list of the Communist Party and independent socialists (Norges Kommunistiske Parti og uavhengige sosialister)	1
Joint list of the Centre Party (Senterpartiet) and the Christian Democratic Party (Kristelig Folkeparti)	4
Total number of members:	17

Grane kommunestyre 1983–1987
Party name (in Norwegian)	Number of representatives
Labour Party (Arbeiderpartiet)	11
Conservative Party (Høyre)	2
Centre Party (Senterpartiet)	3
Socialist Left Party (Sosialistisk Venstreparti)	1
Total number of members:	17

Grane kommunestyre 1979–1983
Party name (in Norwegian)	Number of representatives
Labour Party (Arbeiderpartiet)	10
Conservative Party (Høyre)	1
Christian Democratic Party (Kristelig Folkeparti)	1
Centre Party (Senterpartiet)	4
Joint list of the Communist Party and independent socialists (Norges Kommunistiske Parti og uavhengige sosialister)	1
Total number of members:	17

Grane kommunestyre 1975–1979
Party name (in Norwegian)	Number of representatives
Labour Party (Arbeiderpartiet)	10
Centre Party (Senterpartiet)	5
Socialist Left Party (Sosialistisk Venstreparti)	1
Joint list of the Conservative Party (Høyre), Christian Democratic Party (Kristelig Folkeparti), New People's Party (Nye Folkepartiet), and Liberal Party (Venstre)	1
Total number of members:	17

Grane kommunestyre 1971–1975
Party name (in Norwegian)	Number of representatives
Labour Party (Arbeiderpartiet)	10
Centre Party (Senterpartiet)	5
Local List(s) (Lokale lister)	1
Socialist common list (Venstresosialistiske felleslister)	1
Total number of members:	17

Grane kommunestyre 1967–1971
Party name (in Norwegian)	Number of representatives
Labour Party (Arbeiderpartiet)	11
Centre Party (Senterpartiet)	4
Socialist People's Party (Sosialistisk Folkeparti)	1
Joint List(s) of Non-Socialist Parties (Borgerlige Felleslister)	1
Total number of members:	17

Grane kommunestyre 1963–1967
Party name (in Norwegian)	Number of representatives
Labour Party (Arbeiderpartiet)	12
Centre Party (Senterpartiet)	3
Joint List(s) of Non-Socialist Parties (Borgerlige Felleslister)	2
Total number of members:	17

Grane herredsstyre 1959–1963
Party name (in Norwegian)	Number of representatives
Labour Party (Arbeiderpartiet)	12
Joint List(s) of Non-Socialist Parties (Borgerlige Felleslister)	5
Total number of members:	17

Grane herredsstyre 1955–1959
Party name (in Norwegian)	Number of representatives
Labour Party (Arbeiderpartiet)	10
Communist Party (Kommunistiske Parti)	1
Joint List(s) of Non-Socialist Parties (Borgerlige Felleslister)	6
Total number of members:	17

Grane herredsstyre 1951–1955
Party name (in Norwegian)	Number of representatives
Labour Party (Arbeiderpartiet)	10
Communist Party (Kommunistiske Parti)	1
Joint List(s) of Non-Socialist Parties (Borgerlige Felleslister)	5
Total number of members:	16

Grane herredsstyre 1947–1951
Party name (in Norwegian)	Number of representatives
Labour Party (Arbeiderpartiet)	9
Communist Party (Kommunistiske Parti)	2
Joint List(s) of Non-Socialist Parties (Borgerlige Felleslister)	5
Total number of members:	16

Grane herredsstyre 1945–1947
Party name (in Norwegian)	Number of representatives
Labour Party (Arbeiderpartiet)	10
Communist Party (Kommunistiske Parti)	1
Christian Democratic Party (Kristelig Folkeparti)	2
Local List(s) (Lokale lister)	3
Total number of members:	16

Grane herredsstyre 1937–1941*
Party name (in Norwegian)	Number of representatives
Labour Party (Arbeiderpartiet)	10
Joint List(s) of Non-Socialist Parties (Borgerlige Felleslister)	6
Total number of members:	16
Note: Due to the German occupation of Norway during World War II, no elections were held for new municipal councils until after the war ended in 1945.

=== Mayors ===
The mayor (Norwegian: ordfører) of Grane Municipality is the political leader of the municipality and the chairperson of the municipal council. Here is a list of people who have held this position:

- 1927–1928: Aksel Valberg
- 1929–1931: Adolf Abel (Ap)
- 1931–1934: John Granviken
- 1935–1939: Jens Årøen (Ap)
- 1939–1941: Petter Granmo (Ap)
- 1941–1942: Odd Caroliussen
- 1943–1945: Peter Ludvig Haugen (NS)
- 1945–1945: Petter Granmo (Ap)
- 1946–1955: Ole Danielsen (Ap)
- 1955–1958: Petter Granmo (Ap)
- 1958–1963: Asbjørn Stordal (Ap)
- 1963–1967: Henry Tvedt (Ap)
- 1967–1975: Bjørn Bogfjellmo (Ap)
- 1975–1999: Trond Brennhaug (Ap)
- 1999–2003: Kolbjørn Eriksen (Sp)
- 2003–2019: Bjørn Ivar Lamo (Ap)
- 2019–2023: Ellen Schjølberg (Sp)
- 2023–present: Raymond Fagerli (Sp)

== Notable people ==
- Gustav Kappfjell (born 1913 in Majavatn – 1999), a Southern Sámi reindeer herder, hunter, farmer, poet, and joiker
- Marcus & Martinus (born 2002 in Elverum), a Norwegian pop-duo made up of twins brothers Marcus and Martinus Gunnarsen.
