= Nedre Fiplingvatnet =

Lake in Grane, Norway

Nedre Fiplingvatnet (Norwegian) Fijhpelogkoe (Southern Sami)
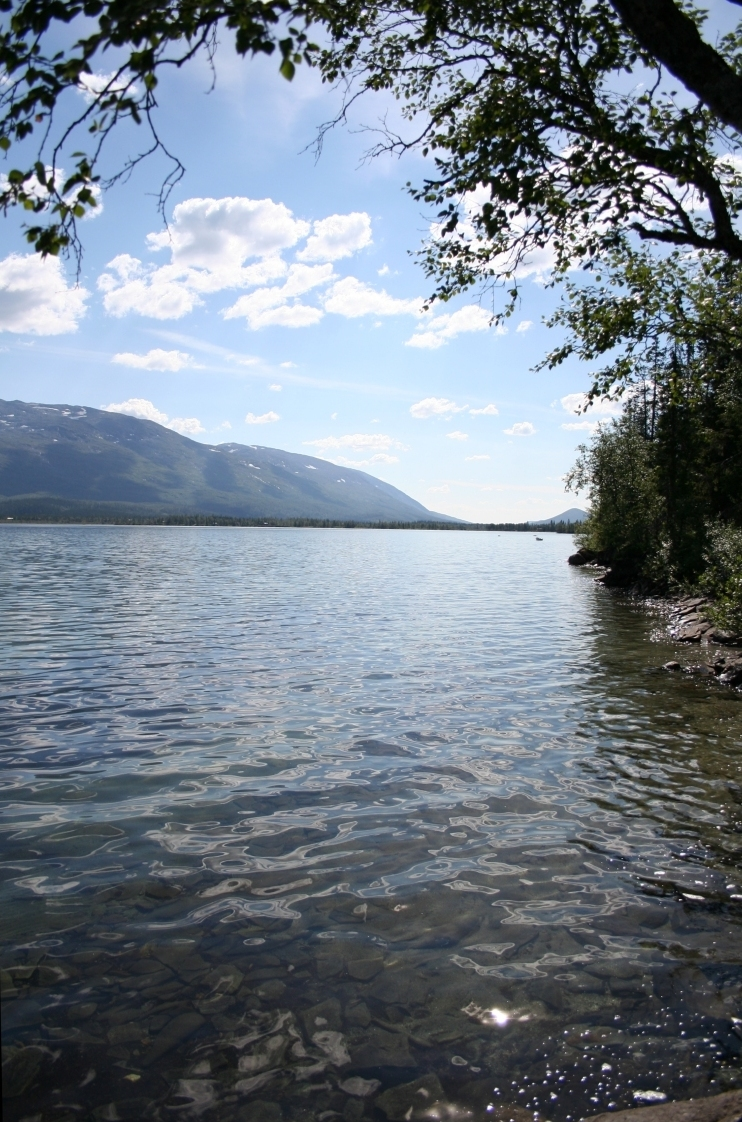
- Interactive map of the lake
- Location: Grane Municipality, Nordland
- Coordinates: 65.3439°N 13.5769°E
- Basin countries: Norway
- Max. length: 9.5 kilometres (5.9 mi)
- Max. width: 1.7 kilometres (1.1 mi)
- Surface area: 10.5 km^{2} (4.1 sq mi)
- Shore length^{1}: 22.05 kilometres (13.70 mi)
- Surface elevation: 364 metres (1,194 ft)
- References: NVE
- ^{1} Shore length is not a well-defined measure.

Nedre Fiplingvatnet (Norwegian) or Fijhpelogkoe (Southern Sami) is a lake in Grane Municipality in Nordland county, Norway. The 10.5-square-kilometre (4.1 sq mi) lake lies just west of Børgefjell National Park. The village of Leiren is located about 4 kilometres (2.5 mi) north of the lake.

== See also ==
- List of lakes in Norway
- Geography of Norway
