= Majavatnet =

Lake in Grane, Norway

Majavatnet (Norwegian) Maajehjaevrie (Southern Sami)
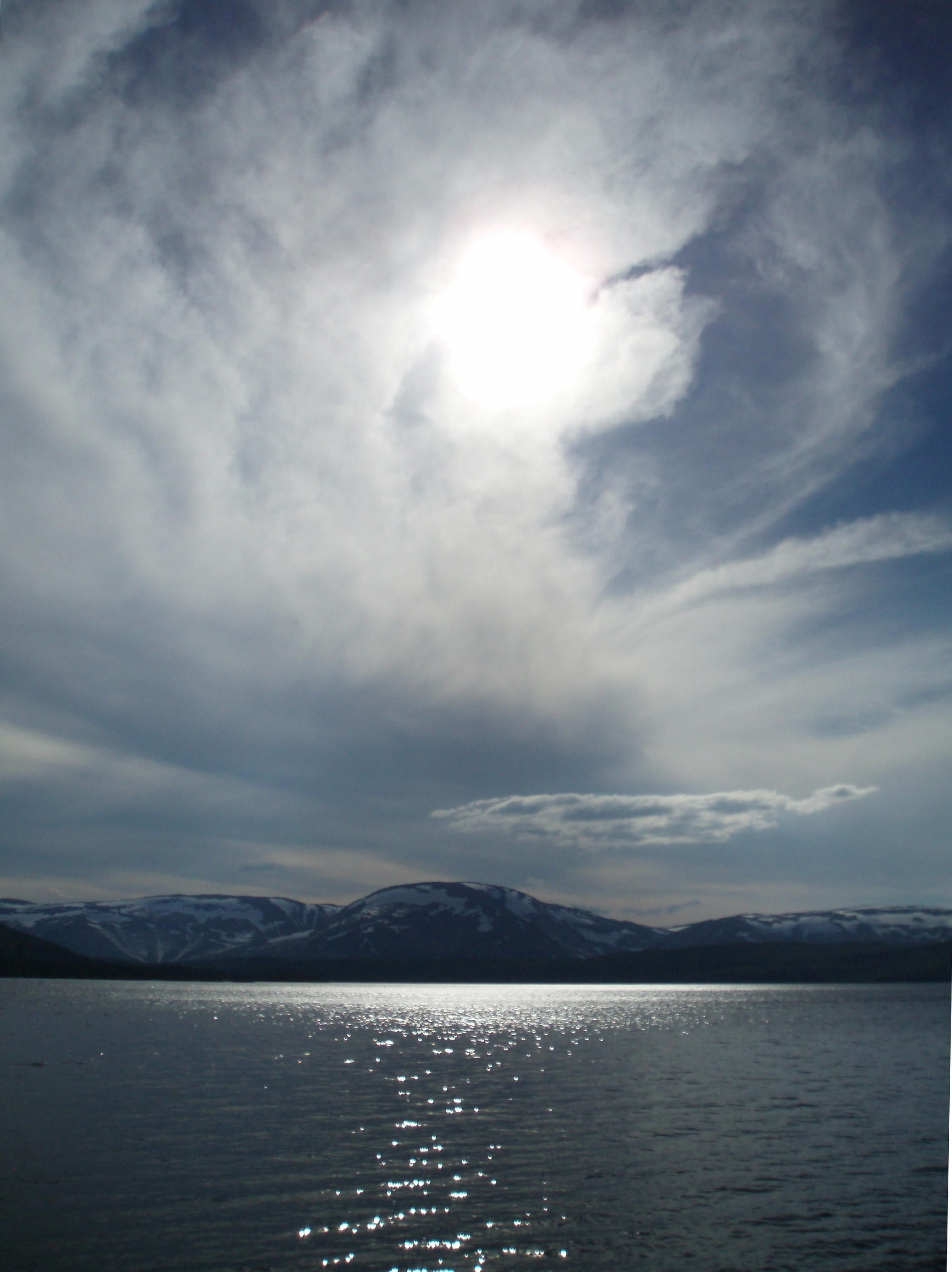
- Interactive map of the lake
- Location: Grane Municipality, Nordland
- Coordinates: 65.1670°N 13.3098°E
- Basin countries: Norway
- Max. length: 6.5 kilometres (4.0 mi)
- Max. width: 4.5 kilometres (2.8 mi)
- Surface area: 16.6 km^{2} (6.4 sq mi)
- Shore length^{1}: 50.37 kilometres (31.30 mi)
- Surface elevation: 310 metres (1,020 ft)
- References: NVE
- ^{1} Shore length is not a well-defined measure.

Majavatnet (Norwegian) or Maajehjaevrie (Southern Sami) is a lake in Grane Municipality in Nordland county, Norway. The 16.6-square-kilometre (6.4 sq mi) lake lies just west of Børgefjell National Park in southern Grane. The village of Majavatn lies on the eastern shore of the lake. The European route E6 highway and the Nordland Line railway both run along the eastern shore of the lake.

== See also ==
- List of lakes in Norway
- Geography of Norway
