= Trofors =

Village in Grane Municipality, Norway

- Village
- Interactive map of Trofors
- Location within Nordland Location within Norway
- Coordinates: 65.5334°N 13.4063°E
- Country: Norway
- Region: Northern Norway
- County: Nordland
- District: Helgeland
- Municipality: Grane Municipality

Area
  - Total: 0.79 km^{2} (0.31 sq mi)
- Elevation: 80 m (260 ft)

Population (2024)
  - Total: 860
  - Density: 1,089/km^{2} (2,820/sq mi)
- Time zone: UTC+01:00 (CET)
  - Summer (DST): UTC+02:00 (CEST)
- Post Code: 8680 Trofors

Trofors is the administrative centre of Grane Municipality in Nordland county, Norway. It is located at the confluence of the rivers Austervefsna and Svenningdalselva which together form the large river Vefsna. The village of Leiren lies about 25 kilometres (16 mi) to the southeast and the village of Majavatn lies about 45 kilometres (28 mi) to the south.

The 0.79-square-kilometre (200-acre) village has a population (2024) of 860 and a population density of 1,089 inhabitants per square kilometre (2,820/sq mi).

Trofors lies along the European route E6 highway, at the intersection with Norwegian National Road 73 which heads east to Hattfjelldal and then to onwards to Sweden. The Nordland Line railway runs through the western part of the village, stopping at Trofors Station. The main church for Trofors is Grane Church, located about 5 kilometres (3.1 mi) to the north in the village of Grane.

== Notable people ==
- Per Joar Hansen (born 1965 in Namsos), a Norwegian football coach
- Marcus & Martinus (born 2002 in Elverum), a Norwegian pop-duo made up of twins brothers Marcus and Martinus Gunnarsen
