= Bjerkreim =

Bjerkreim may refer to:

== People ==
- Betty Ann Bjerkreim Nilsen (born 1986), a Norwegian orienteering competitor and cross-country skier
- Ragnar Bjerkreim (born 1958), a Norwegian composer
- Vegard Bjerkreim Nilsen (born 1993), a Norwegian cross-country skier

== Places ==
- Bjerkreim Municipality, a municipality in Rogaland county, Norway
- Bjerkreim (village), a village within Bjerkreim Municipality in Rogaland county, Norway
- Bjerkreim Church, a church in Bjerkreim Municipality in Rogaland county, Norway
