= Austrumdalsvatnet =

Lake in Rogaland, Norway

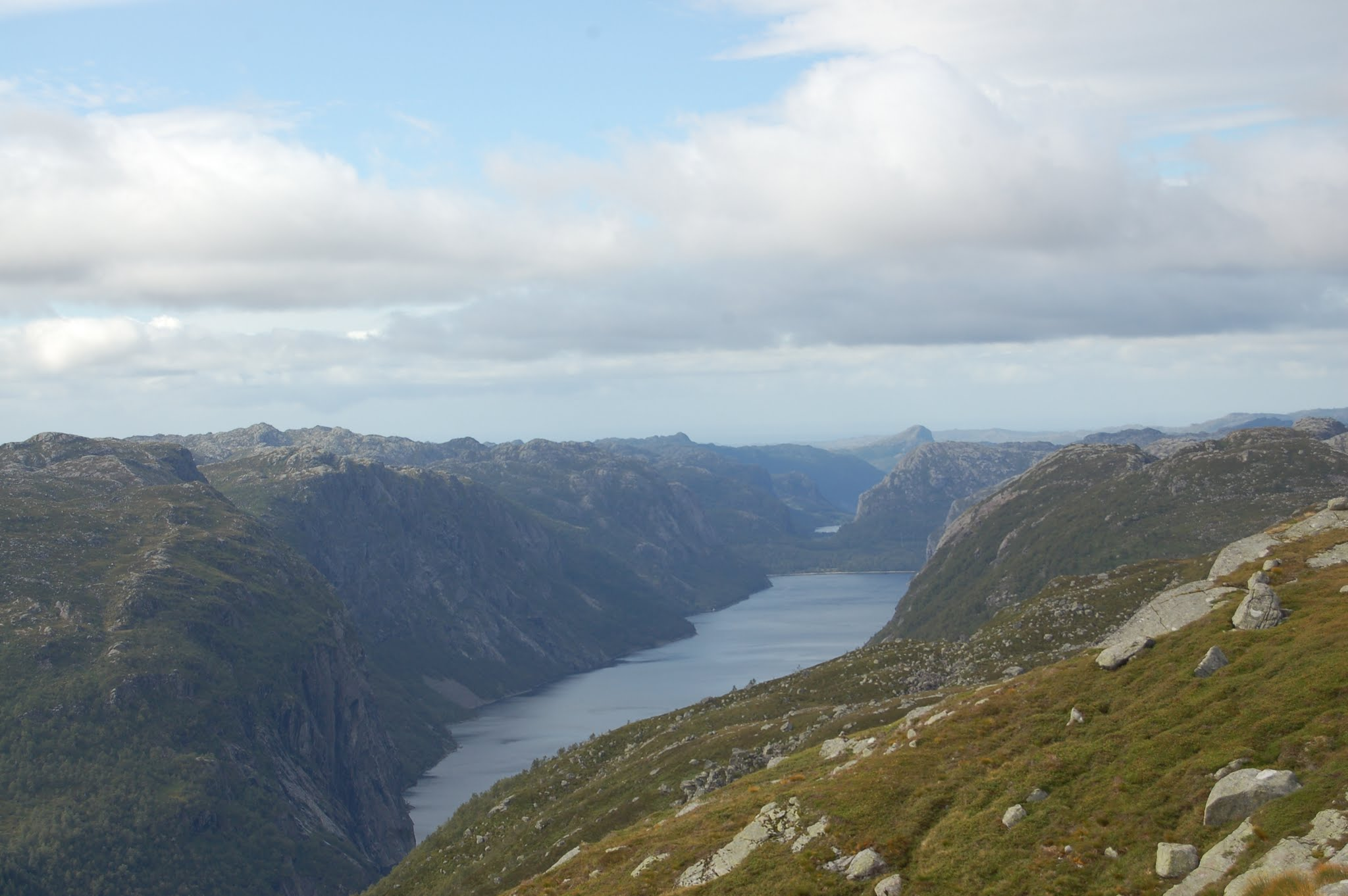
- Interactive map of Austrumdalsvatnet
- Location: Bjerkreim Municipality, Rogaland
- Coordinates: 58.69068°N 6.26978°E
- Type: Fjord lake
- Primary inflows: Stavtjørna and Åni
- Primary outflows: Austrumdalsåna river
- Catchment area: 61 km^{2} (24 sq mi)
- Basin countries: Norway
- Max. length: 6 km (3.7 mi)
- Max. width: 750 m (2,460 ft)
- Surface area: 2.89 km^{2} (1.12 sq mi)
- Average depth: 52.9 m (174 ft)
- Max. depth: 104 m (341 ft)
- Water volume: 0.153 km^{3} (0.037 cu mi)
- Shore length^{1}: 13.82 kilometres (8.59 mi)
- Surface elevation: 309 metres (1,014 ft)
- References: NVE
- ^{1} Shore length is not a well-defined measure.

Austrumdalsvatnet is a lake in Bjerkreim Municipality in Rogaland county, Norway. The 2.89-square-kilometre (1.12 sq mi) lake lies about 2.5 kilometres (1.6 mi) southeast of the lakes Hofreistæ and Birkelandsvatnet. The village of Øvrebygd lies about 3 kilometres (1.9 mi) west of the lake.

== See also ==
- List of lakes in Norway
