= Amund Helland (merchant) =

Norwegian merchant

Amund Helland (17 August 1786 – 20 August 1870) was a Norwegian merchant and leading trader in Bergen, Norway.

== Biography ==
Helland was born in the parish of Bjerkreim Church in Rogaland, Norway. He was the son of Eivind Helland (1749-1833) and Elen Abeland (1751-1833). He grew up on the Helland farm in the area. In 1804, Hans Nielsen Hauge visited Bjerkreim. Helland was gripped by Hauge's sermons and went with him to Bergen. He became a devote Haugean (haugianere) and worked with Hauge for three year. He next went to sea for several years. In 1813, he returned to Bergen where he became a leading merchant. He developed his own fleet and traded in grain carried in his ships to Trøndelag returning with fish from Northern Norway.

== Personal life ==
He was first married to Talette Vig (1786–1820), with whom he had three children. Two years after the first wife's death, he married her younger sister Malene Vig (1790–1859) with whom he had six children. He was the grandfather of geologist, Amund Helland. He lived in Bergen until his death in 1870.
