= Directives for military officers and military commanders in the event of an armed attack on Norway =

Norwegian military directive

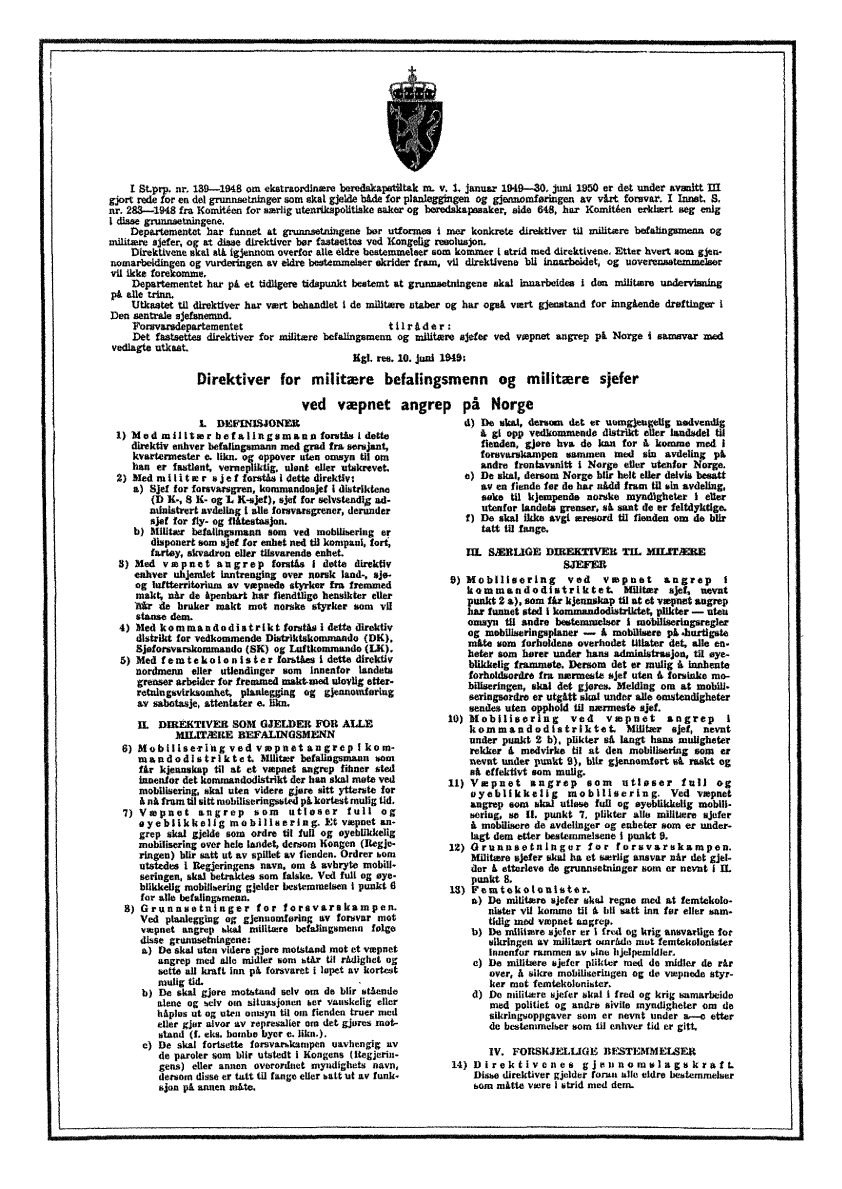
Direktiver for militære befalingsmenn og militære sjefer ved væpnet angrep på Norge, also known as the poster on the wall

The Directives for military officers and military commanders in the event of an armed attack on Norway (Direktiver for militære befalingsmenn og militære sjefer ved væpnet angrep på Norge) is commonly referred to as “the poster on the wall” (plakaten på veggen) since it was posted in every military office wall until after the Cold War ended. The poster on the wall is a directive which sets out the duties for all Norwegian commanding officers and Ministry Officials during any attack on Norway. It was issued by Norwegian Royal resolution on June 10, 1949.

According to unwritten tradition, this directive was to be hung in each military office in Norway.

== Background ==
When Germany invaded Norway on April 9, 1940, many of Norway’s commanding officers of both the Army and the Navy were uncertain of what to do since they did not receive any orders. This led to many giving up without mounting a defence. Although the highest levels of government ordered an immediate mobilization, the ministers of the Norwegian government knew nothing about the details of mobilization, which were left totally to the Ministry of Defence. Since the Minister of Defence was new to his duties, he deferred this action to his Commander-in Chief, General Kristian Laake.

Kersaudy describes the events which then followed as: “On the morning of 9 April, however, the General obstinately refused to take the alert seriously and it was only with the greatest difficulty that the officer on duty at headquarters could prevail on him to leave his country home and return to Oslo. But once in Oslo, the General called the Minister of Defence and advised him to mobilize the four brigades stationed in southern Norway…” The mobilization plan for a partial mobilization at the time relied on the post office to order these brigades to mobilize, with an inherent delay of several days.

The situation was further confused by the radio announcement by Vidkun Quisling of a coup d'etat declaring an ad hoc government during the muddle of the invasion. He ordered that the defence mobilization should cease. This, combined with misdirection by other Nasjonal Samling leaders led to all-out confusion such that the mobilization was not effected until hours after the first German advance forces reached Norwegian soil. This poorly managed mobilization allowed German forces to establish a strong beachhead in Norway.

Despite the strength of the German invaders and the poor initial leadership and misdirection, the Norwegian armed forces, aided by British, French and Polish forces, kept up an organized military resistance for two months, longer than any other country invaded by Germany, except for the Soviet Union. The resistance was notably strong at Vinjesvingen, Gloppedalsura, Fossum bridge, Hegra and the Narvik front.

An important influence for this document, was the Battle of Drøbak Sound, where the Oscarsborg Fortress at the ship route to Oslo opened fire on own decision on passing German warships and sank the leading one. This gave the King and the government several hours of time to order mobilization, evacuate the gold reserve and leave Oslo for London.

With the start of the Cold War and the memory of the occupation years, the Norwegian people wanted to be well prepared for any future invasion. Therefore, directives were issued to guide response in the event of any invasion of Norway, the Direktiver for militære befalingsmenn og militære sjefer ved angrep på Norge.

Even if the text of the directive does not directly apply to the rest of the rank and file of the armed forces, the duty to defend Norway, is "De Jure" based on the Norwegian Constitution §85 (Defence against treason or acts against the Storting) and §109 (Conscription), in short, both articles clearly states that one shall defend Norway against any threat, foreign or domestic.

”De facto” the directive is taught to all conscripts and is subsumed to be equally applicable to all personnel, regardless of rank.

== The directive ==
The directive instructs all military officers and military commanders that they were to:

- Take up arms and fight courageously against each and every enemy who attempts to invade and conquer Norway.
- Know that once a mobilization order has been issued, it can not be recalled before each and every individual musters at his point of mobilization.
- Know that all orders, even those issued in the King’s name or the ministry’s name, which countermand the mobilization are phony and shall not be complied with.
- Recognize it is every man’s duty to resist, even though all may appear lost and others give up. Resistance shall be continued both at home and abroad.
- In the event of a partially successful or successful invasion, engage in both espionage and sabotage.
- In the event of capture, provide no information to the enemy while a prisoner of war.

The directive consists of four sections, which are summarized below:

=== Definitions ===
1. Defines what is meant by 'military officer and military commander', namely all officers and non commissioned officers ranking from sergeant and up.
2. Defines what is meant by 'military commanders (commanding officers)'.
3. Defines what is meant by 'armed attack', namely 'any unapproved entry of Norwegian air, sea or land by foreign armed forces, who clearly has unfriendly intentions or uses force against Norwegian forces'.
4. Defines what is meant by 'area of command'
5. Defines what is meant by 'fifth columnists, namely 'Norwegians or foreigners who, within Norway, works for a foreign power by illegal intelligence gathering, sabotage, assassinations and so on'.

=== Directives that applies to all officers and NCOs ===
6. Any attack in an officer's area of command triggers a full mobilization
7. Any attack on Norway triggers a full mobilization across the nation if the King or the government is unable to act (taken prisoners or killed). Any orders to cancel the mobilization are to be considered fake, and shall not be acted upon.
8. Principles of defence:
  1. All available forces shall be committed to the defence as soon as possible.
  2. The resistance shall continue even if the situation is hopeless and the enemy threatens to attack civilian targets.
  3. The resistance shall continue despite any orders to the contrary given by the King or the government if these are captured or otherwise incapacitated.
  4. If retreat is the only option, the resistance shall continue on other fronts in Norway or abroad.
  5. If Norway itself has to be surrendered, all and any officers and NCOs who are capable shall join Norwegian forces abroad.
  6. Officers and NCOs are not to give an enemy their word of honour if captured.

=== Special directives for commanding officers ===
9. Any attack in an officer's field of command triggers a full mobilization, which shall be done in the swiftest possible manner.
10. The commanding officer shall do his utmost to ensure a swift mobilisation is his area of command.
11. In case of an attack as mentioned in 7, ensure a swift mobilisation is his area of command.
12. The commanding officer is responsible for making sure that the principles of defence mentioned in 8 is followed.
13. Fifth column:
  1. The commanding officer must assume a fifth column will be active before and during an armed attack.
  2. The commanding officer is responsible to protect his forces against fifth columnists as best he can.
  3. The commanding officer is responsible to protect the mobilization process against fifth columnists as best he can.
  4. The commanding officer shall in war and peace cooperate with the police and other civilian authorities in regards of the tasks mentioned under a to c.

=== Miscellaneous ===
14. These directives replace any older directives, regulations and laws that are not in line with this directive.

== Translation ==
"Definitions

1) In this directive, the meaning of military befalingsmann is any befalingsmann with rank above sergeant, kvartermester and likewise and above, without regard to if he is salaried, conscripted, unpaid or commandeered."

== Mention in legend ==
The directive has only been close to implementation once. On 3 June 1968, the Leningrad Military District in the former Soviet Union was placed on alert. Within a couple of days the mobilized forces in the Leningrad region reached 11,000 soldiers, 4,000 marines, 210 tanks, 500 troop transports, 265 self-propelled cannons, 1,300 logistics transports, 50 helicopters, and 20 transport aircraft (Antonov An-12), all of which were staged in the Petchenga-Murmansk area near Norway.

On the evening of 7 June, the garrison (Garnisonen i Sør-Varanger or GSV) heard the noise of powerful engines coming from the manoeuvres along the entire Soviet front of the Norwegian-Soviet border. Actual observations were not possible over the border, due to bad weather, so the GSV commanding officer ordered all GSV reserve forces to report to their emergency muster locations.

Eventually, the impressive numbers of the Soviet forces staged along the entire border became visible. The GSV commanding officer called the ministry for instructions. Although unrecorded, the conversation (perhaps apocryphal) is said to have been as follows:

Commanding officer of GSV: What shall I do when the Soviet forces cross the border?
Minister of Defence: Have you read the poster on the wall?
Commanding officer of GSV: Yes.
Minister of Defence: Then you know the correct action once the Soviet forces cross the border.
Commanding officer of GSV: Yes Mr. Minister, it means war.

The Soviet demonstration of aggression lasted until 10 June, when the Soviet forces stood down.

== See also ==
- If the war comes
