= Ørsdalsvatnet =

Lake in Rogaland, Norway

- Ørdalsvatnet
- Interactive map of Ørsdalsvatnet
- Location: Bjerkreim Municipality, Rogaland
- Coordinates: 58.62676°N 6.21082°E
- Type: Fault / fjord lake
- Primary inflows: Bjordalsåna, Høylandsåna, Kvitlaåna, Litlåna and Storåna
- Primary outflows: Oreåna river
- Catchment area: 245.05 km^{2} (94.61 sq mi)
- Basin countries: Norway
- Max. length: 17 km (11 mi)
- Max. width: 1.2 km (0.75 mi)
- Surface area: 12.39 km^{2} (4.78 sq mi)
- Average depth: 137 m (449 ft)
- Max. depth: 243 m (797 ft)
- Water volume: 1.697 km^{3} (0.407 cu mi)
- Shore length^{1}: 36.52 km (22.69 mi)
- Surface elevation: 64 m (210 ft)
- References: NVE
- ^{1} Shore length is not a well-defined measure.

Ørsdalsvatnet is a lake in Bjerkreim Municipality in Rogaland county, Norway. The 12.39-square-kilometre (4.78 sq mi) lake lies about 2 kilometres (1.2 mi) northeast of the village of Bjerkreim. The lake is rather narrow, but it is 17 km (11 mi) long.

== See also ==
- List of lakes in Norway
