= Bjerkrheim =

Bjerkrheim is a Norwegian surname. Notable people with the surname include:

- Susann Goksør Bjerkrheim (born 1970), Norwegian handball player
- Svein-Erik Bjerkrheim (born 1971), Norwegian schoolteacher and handball player

== See also ==
- Bjerkreim, surname
