= Olaf Gjedrem =

Norwegian politician

Olaf Gjedrem (born 15 December 1948 in Bjerkreim Municipality) is a Norwegian politician for the Christian Democratic Party.

He served as a deputy representative to the Norwegian Parliament from Rogaland during the terms 1993–1997, 1997–2001, 2001–2005 and 2005–2009. From 1997 to 2000, and 2001 to 2004, he met as a regular representative meanwhile Hilde Frafjord Johnson was appointed to the first and Einar Steensnæs was appointed to the second cabinet Bondevik.

Gjedrem was a member of the municipal council of Bjerkreim Municipality from 1975 to 1995, serving as mayor from 1979 to 1993 and then the last two years as deputy mayor. He was a member of Rogaland county council during the term 1995–1999. He chaired the municipal party chapter from 1976 to 1980 and from 2006, and the county party chapter from 1983 to 1986.

He has also chaired the county chapter of KS, and is active in Nei til EU. He has worked as a school teacher and a farmer.
