= Øvrebygd =

Village in Bjerkreim Municipality, Norway

- Village
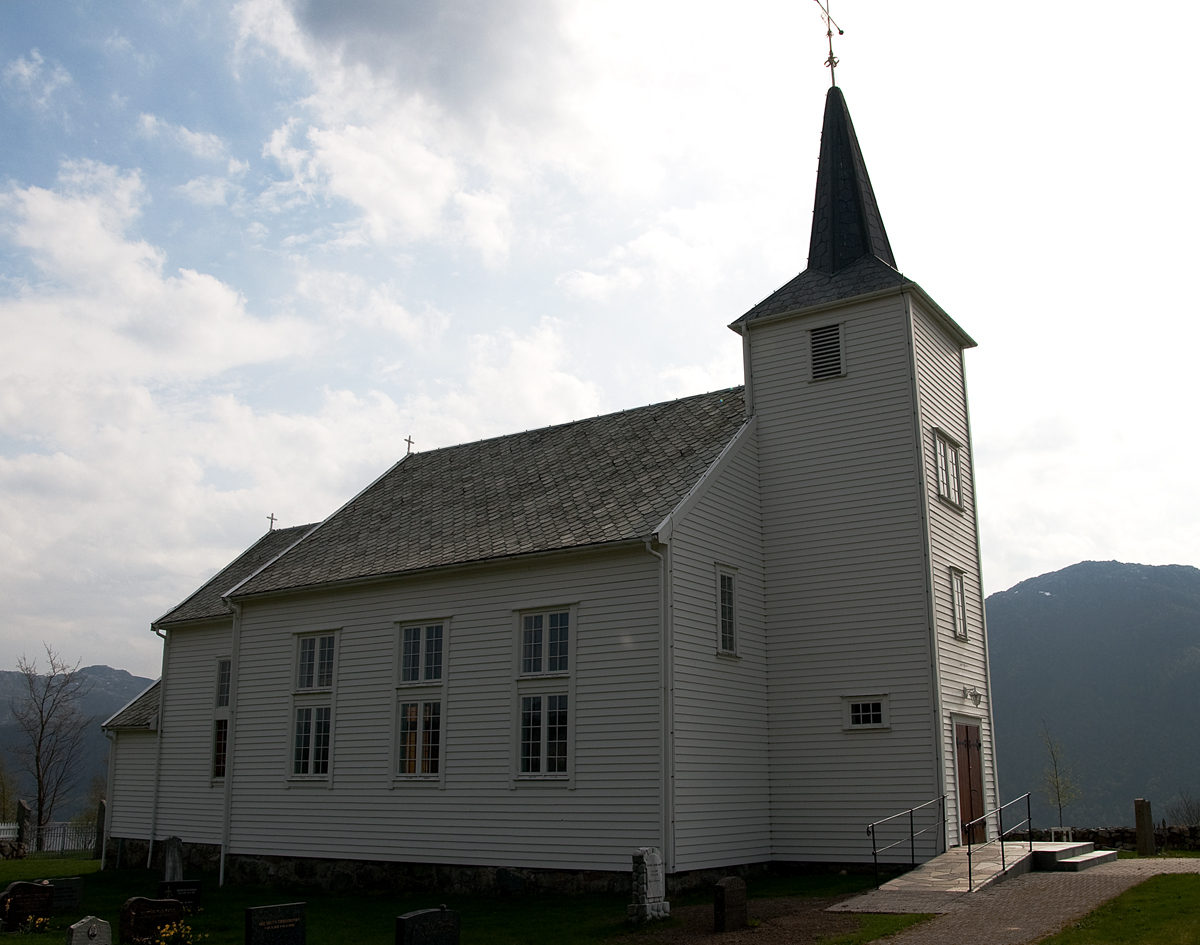
- View of the village chapel
- Interactive map of Øvrebygd
- Coordinates: 58.68668°N 6.16078°E
- Country: Norway
- Region: Western Norway
- County: Rogaland
- District: Dalane
- Municipality: Bjerkreim Municipality
- Elevation: 197 m (646 ft)
- Time zone: UTC+01:00 (CET)
  - Summer (DST): UTC+02:00 (CEST)
- Post Code: 4389 Vikeså

Øvrebygd is a small village in Bjerkreim Municipality in Rogaland county, Norway. The village is located about 10 kilometres (6.2 mi) northeast of the municipal centre of Vikeså along the road leading to the neighboring Gjesdal Municipality. Ivesdal Chapel is located in this village. The village lies on the north shore of the lake Hofreistæ and the lake Birkelandsvatnet lies less than 2 kilometres (1.2 mi) to the north.
