= Ivesdal Chapel =

Church in Rogaland, Norway

- Ivesdal kapell
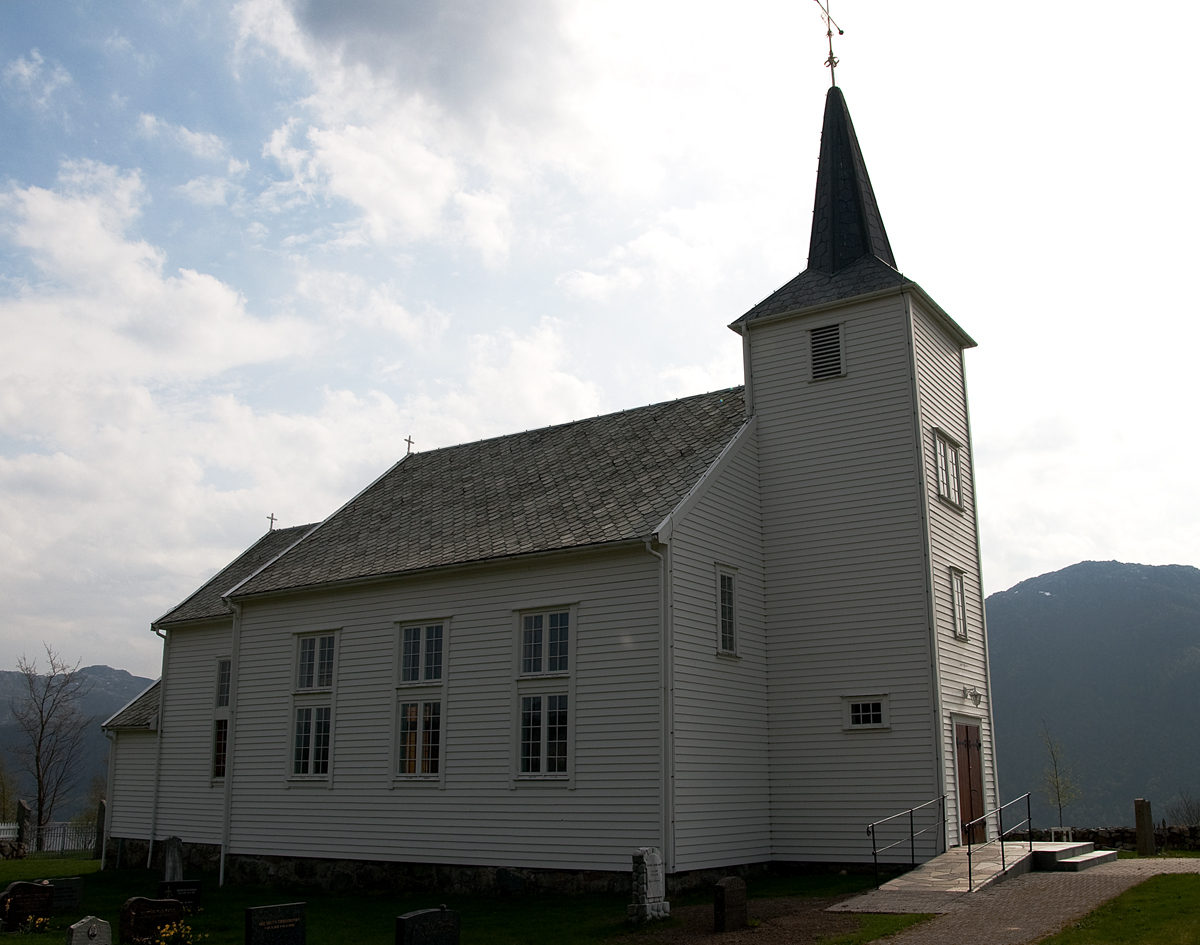
- View of the church
- Ivesdal Chapel
- 58.68795°N 6.15947°E
- Location: Bjerkreim Municipality, Rogaland
- Country: Norway
- Denomination: Church of Norway
- Churchmanship: Evangelical Lutheran

History
- Status: Parish church
- Founded: 1876
- Consecrated: 1876

Architecture
- Functional status: Active
- Architect(s): Larsen and Helleland
- Architectural type: Long church
- Completed: 1876 (150 years ago)

Specifications
- Capacity: 210
- Materials: Wood

Administration
- Diocese: Stavanger bispedømme
- Deanery: Dalane prosti
- Parish: Bjerkreim
- Norwegian Cultural Heritage Site
- Type: Church
- Status: Not protected
- ID: 84730

Ivesdal Chapel (Norwegian: Ivesdal kapell) is a parish church of the Church of Norway in Bjerkreim Municipality in Rogaland county, Norway. It is located in the village of Øvrebygd. It is one of the two churches for the Bjerkreim parish which is part of the Dalane prosti (deanery) in the Diocese of Stavanger. The white, wooden church was built in a long church style in 1876 using designs by the architects Larsen and Helleland. The church seats about 210 people.

== See also ==
- List of churches in Rogaland
