= Hofreistæ =

Lake in Rogaland, Norway

- Hofreistævatnet (historic)
- Interactive map of Hofreistæ
- Location: Bjerkreim Municipality, Rogaland
- Coordinates: 58.68287°N 6.17383°E
- Primary inflows: Malmeisåna river
- Primary outflows: Hofreistæåna river
- Basin countries: Norway
- Max. length: 2.9 kilometres (1.8 mi)
- Max. width: 1.3 kilometres (0.81 mi)
- Surface area: 2.66 km^{2} (1.03 sq mi)
- Shore length^{1}: 8.11 kilometres (5.04 mi)
- Surface elevation: 167 metres (548 ft)
- References: NVE
- ^{1} Shore length is not a well-defined measure.

Hofreistæ is a lake in Bjerkreim Municipality in Rogaland county, Norway. The 2.66-square-kilometre (1.03 sq mi) lake immediately south of the village of Øvrebygd. The lake is fed by a short river from the lakes Austrumdalsvatnet and Byrkjelandsvatnet. The river Hofreistæåna flows south out of this lake and eventually feeds into the river Bjerkreimselva.

== See also ==
- List of lakes in Norway
