= Birkelandsvatnet =

Lake in Rogaland, Norway

Birkelandsvatnet Storavatnet
- Byrkjelandsvatnet
- Interactive map of the lake
- Location: Bjerkreim Municipality, Rogaland
- Coordinates: 58.70672°N 6.14291°E
- Type: Fjord lake
- Primary outflows: Malmeisåna river
- Basin countries: Norway
- Max. length: 7.5 km (4.7 mi)
- Max. width: 2 km (1.2 mi)
- Surface area: 5.17 km^{2} (2.00 sq mi)
- Max. depth: 90 m (300 ft)
- Shore length^{1}: 22.36 km (13.89 mi)
- Surface elevation: 179 m (587 ft)
- References: NVE
- ^{1} Shore length is not a well-defined measure.

Birkelandsvatnet or Storavatnet is a lake in Bjerkreim Municipality in Rogaland county, Norway. The 5.17-square-kilometre (2.00 sq mi) lake lies about 2 kilometres (1.2 mi) north of the village of Øvrebygd. The lake flows out through the short river Malmeisåna which flows into the lake Hofreistæ.

== See also ==
- List of lakes in Norway
