= Gloppedalsura =

Scree in Norway

- Gloppura (unofficial)
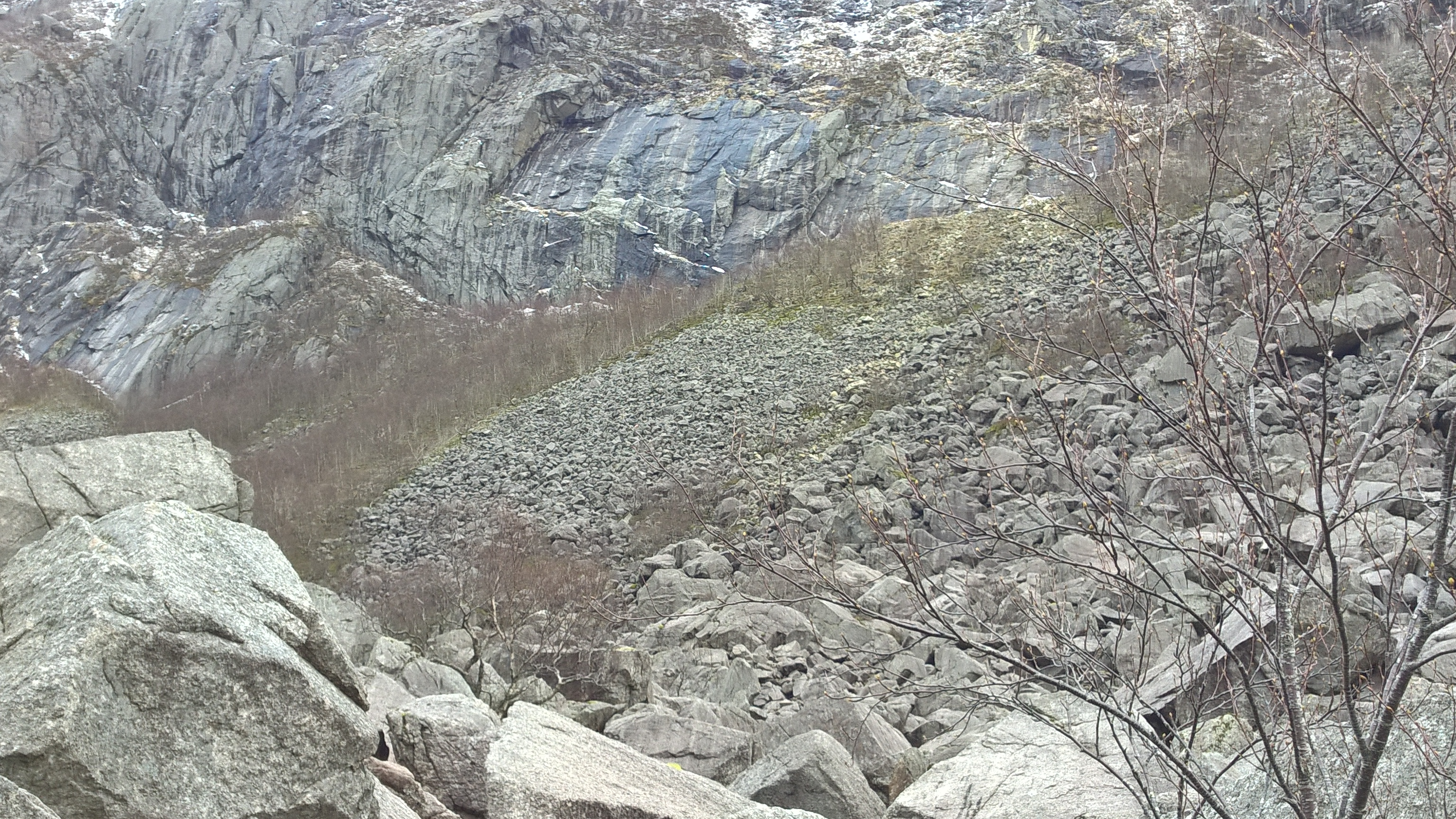
- View of Gloppedalsura

Geology
- Type: Scree

Geography
- Location: Rogaland, Norway
- Coordinates: 58.76813°N 6.27885°E

Location
- Interactive map of Gloppedalsura

Gloppedalsura is a scree in the Gloppedalen valley in Rogaland county, Norway. The scree valley lies on the border of Gjesdal Municipality and Bjerkreim Municipality. It is one of the largest screes in Scandinavia and Northern Europe.

== World War 2 ==
During the invasion of Norway, 250 Norwegian soldiers used the scree as a natural fortress and held back two German battalions. One Norwegian soldier lost his life in the battle. Losses on the German side are uncertain and varies between 12 and 44 soldiers.
