= Bjerkreim Municipality =

Municipality in Rogaland, Norway

Bjerkreim Municipality Bjerkreim kommune
- Municipality
- Birkrem herred (historic name)
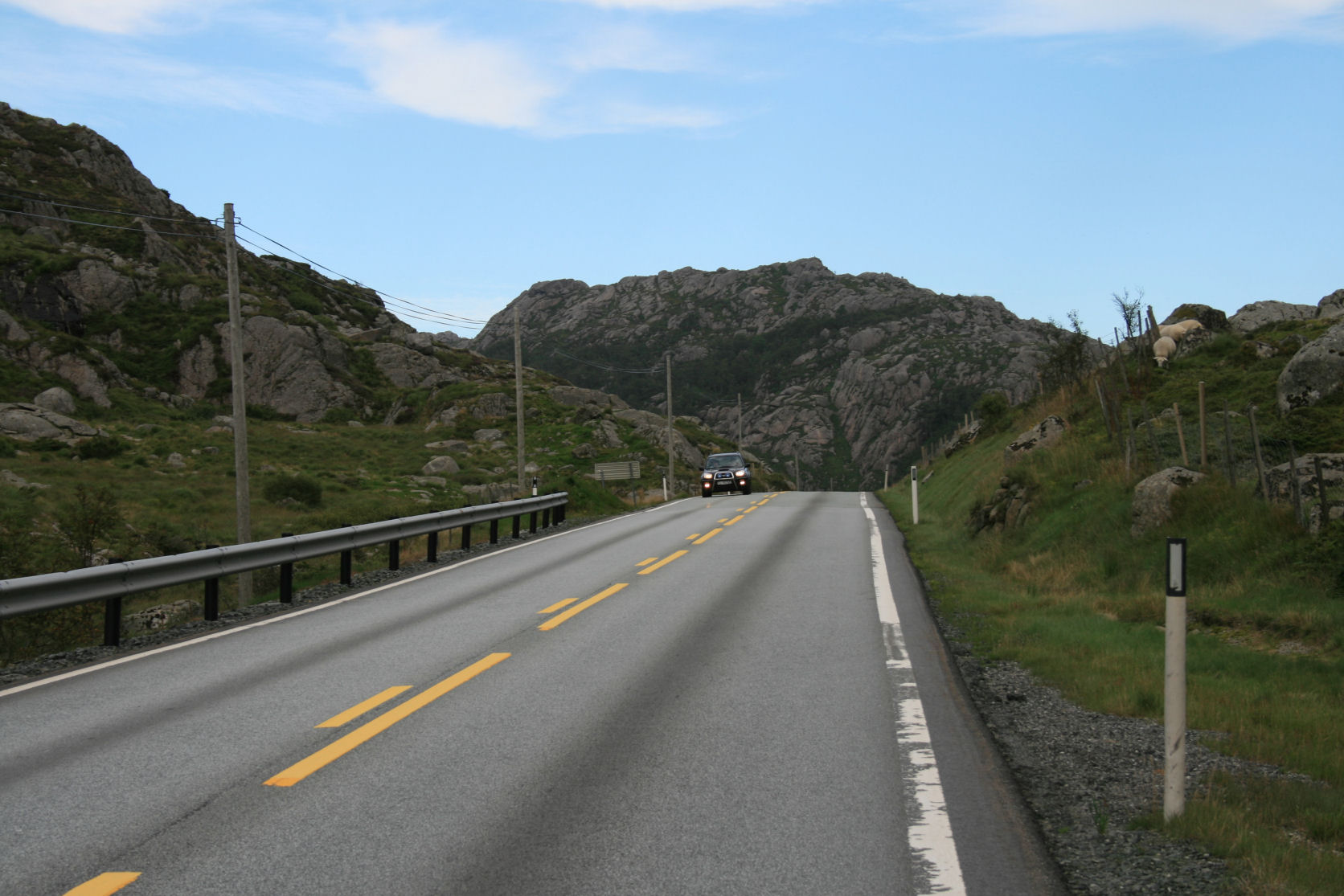
- View of the Bjerkreim landscape

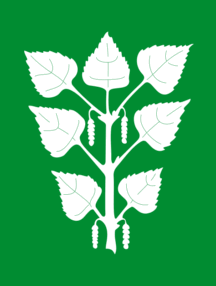
- Flag Coat of arms

- Rogaland within Norway

- Bjerkreim within Rogaland
- Coordinates: 58°39′25″N 06°08′48″E
- Country: Norway
- County: Rogaland
- District: Dalane
- Established: 1 Jan 1838
  - Created as: Formannskapsdistrikt
- Administrative centre: Vikeså

Government
  - Mayor (2023): Tone Vaule (Ap)

Area
  - Total: 650.55 km^{2} (251.18 sq mi)
  - Land: 576.15 km^{2} (222.45 sq mi)
  - Water: 74.4 km^{2} (28.7 sq mi) 11.4%
  - Rank: #173 in Norway
- Highest elevation: 906.99 m (2,975.7 ft)

Population (2026)
  - Total: 2,894
  - Rank: #236 in Norway
  - Density: 4.4/km^{2} (11/sq mi)
  - Change (10 years): ▲ +2.4%
- Demonym: Bjerkreimsbu

Official language
  - Norwegian form: Nynorsk
- Time zone: UTC+01:00 (CET)
  - Summer (DST): UTC+02:00 (CEST)
- ISO 3166 code: NO-1114
- Website: Official website

Bjerkreim is a municipality in Rogaland county, Norway. It is located in the traditional district of Dalane. The administrative centre of the municipality is the village of Vikeså. Other villages in the municipality include Røysland and Øvrebygd.

Nature has been generous in giving Bjerkreim many idyllic places, making Bjerkreim a good place to live by living in a countryside environment, but still relatively close to a major city, Stavanger. Bjerkreim has one of the most important salmon rivers in Norway, Bjerkreimselva. The most important livelihoods are agriculture and small-scale industries.

The 650.55-square-kilometre (251.18 sq mi) municipality is the 173rd largest by area out of the 357 municipalities in Norway. Bjerkreim Municipality is the 236th most populous municipality in Norway with a population of 2,894. The municipality's population density is 4.4 inhabitants per square kilometre (11/sq mi) and its population has increased by 2.4% over the previous 10-year period.

== General information ==
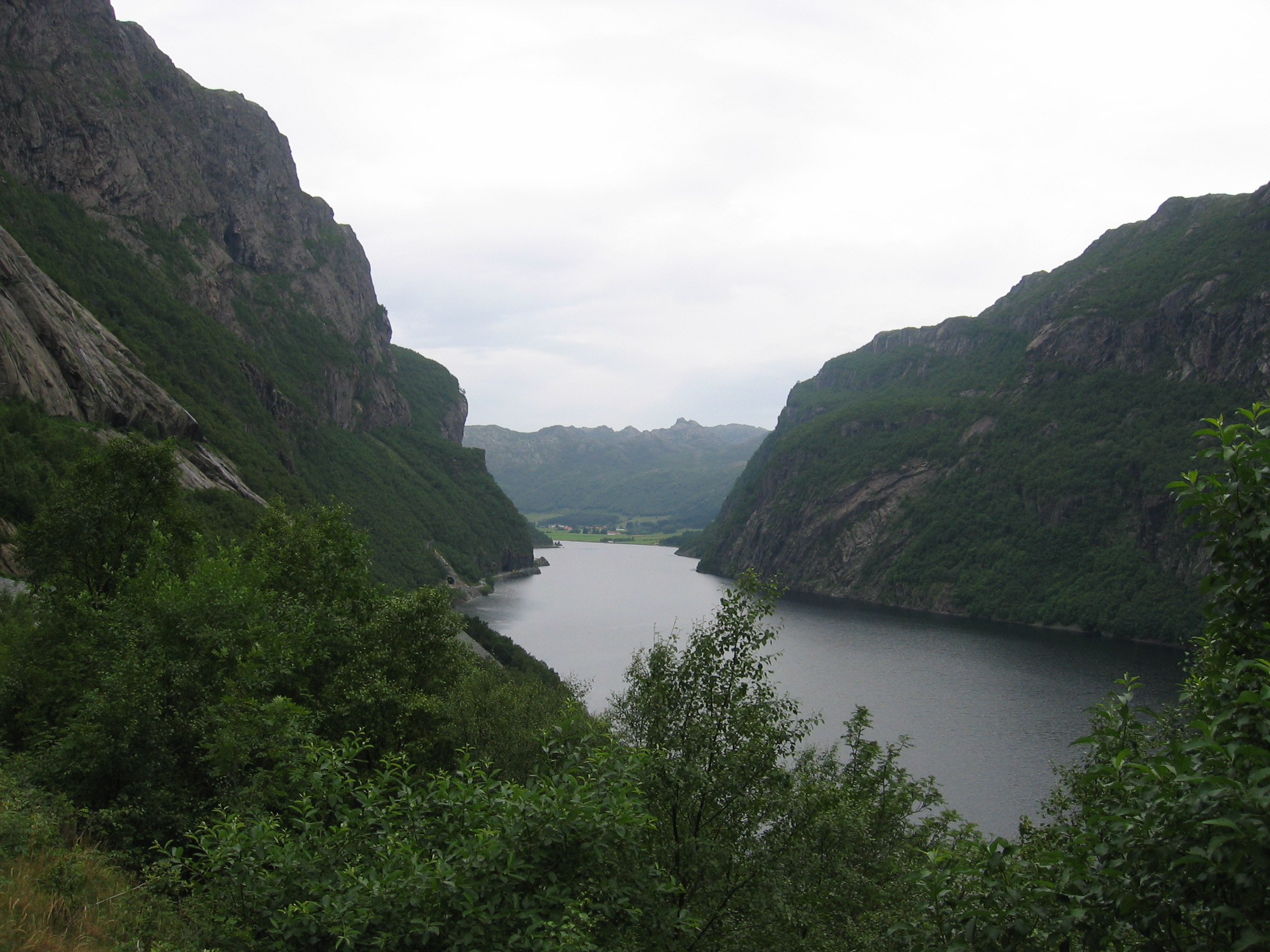
View of the lake Indra Vinjavatnet

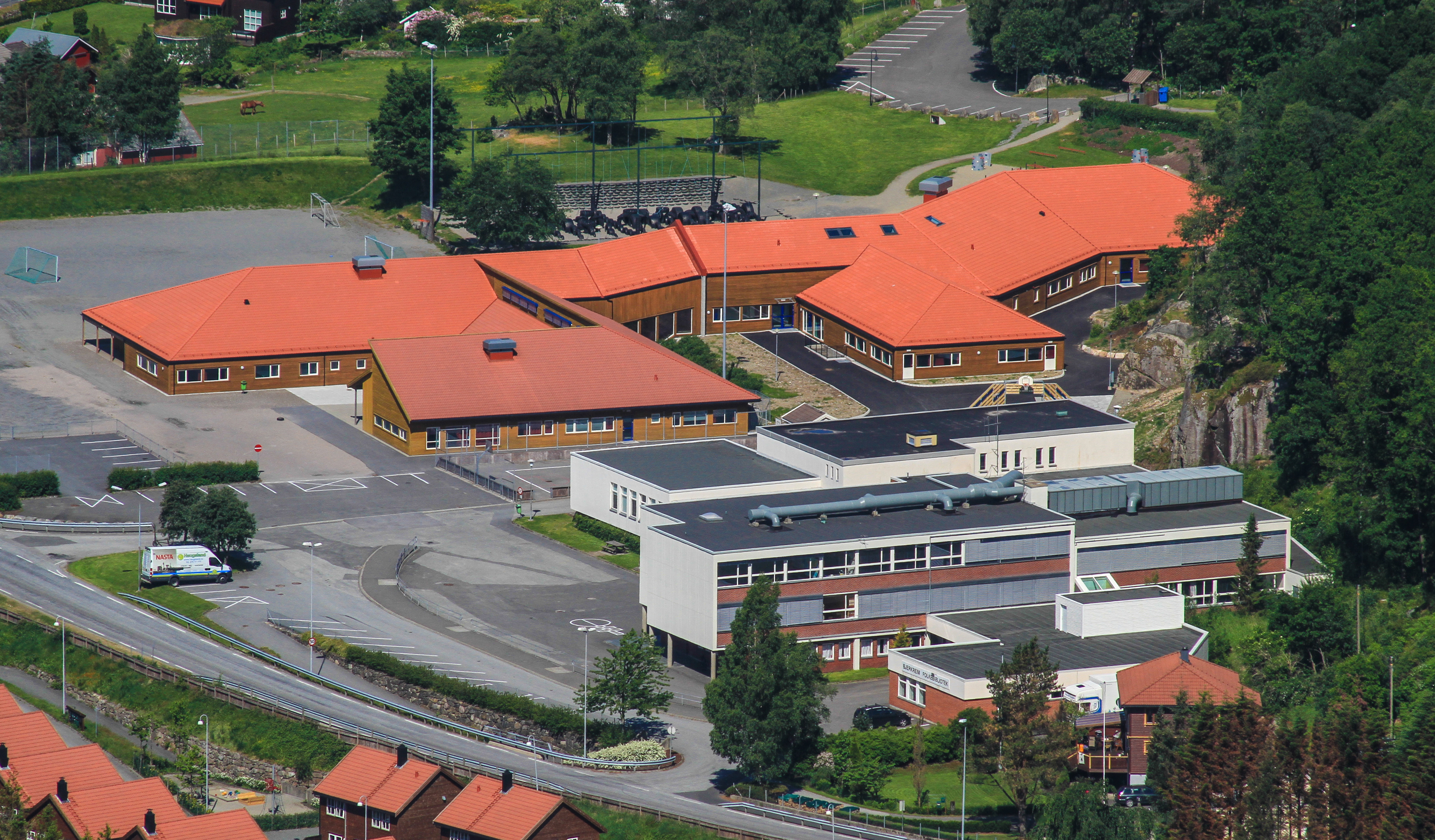
Vikeså School

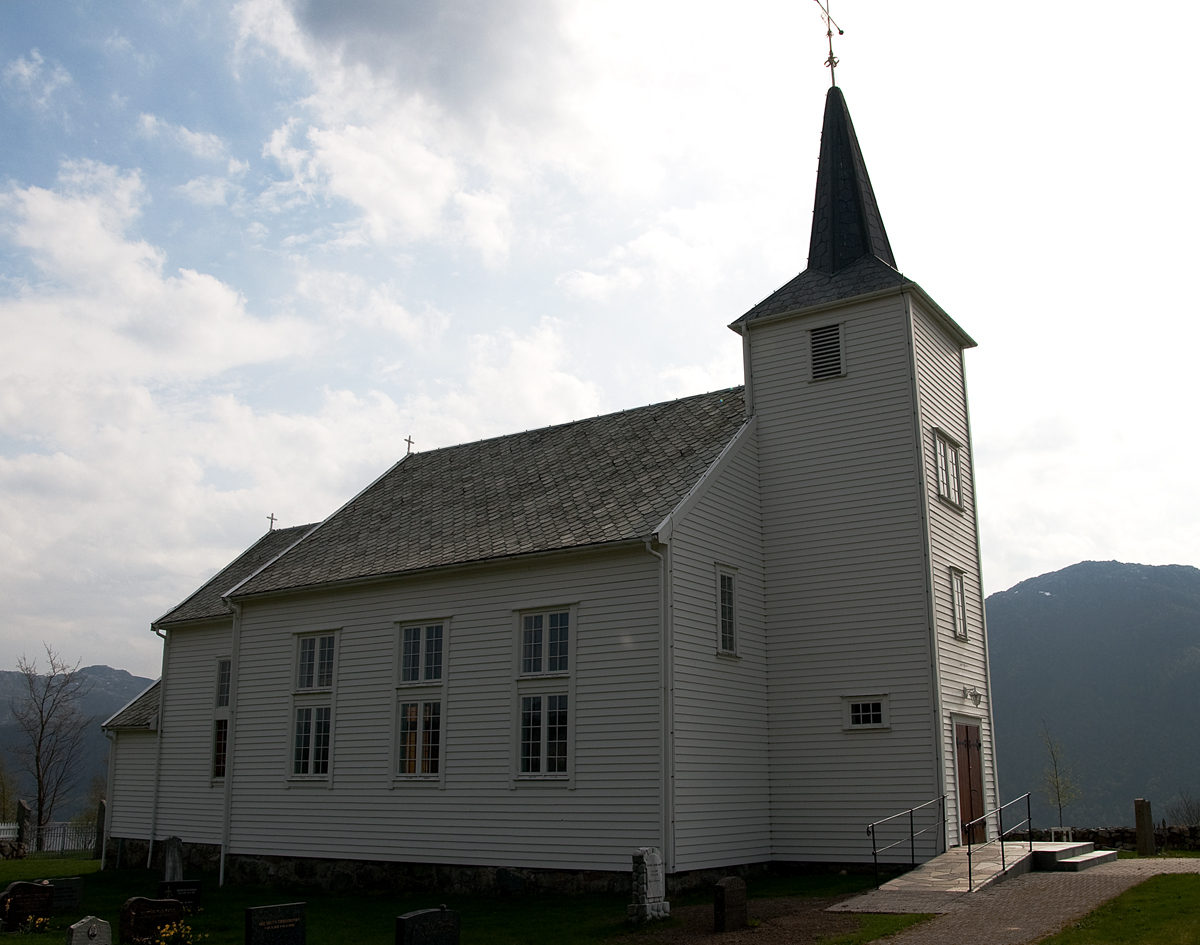
Ivesdal Chapel

The parish of Birkrem (later spelled Bjerkreim) was established as a municipality on 1 January 1838 (see formannskapsdistrikt law). During the 1960s, there were many municipal mergers across Norway due to the work of the Schei Committee. On 1 January 1965, the Nedre Maudal area of Bjerkreim Municipality (population: 40) was transferred to the neighboring Gjesdal Municipality. The boundaries have not changed since that time.

=== Name ===
The municipality (originally the parish) is named after the old Bjerkreim farm (Old Norse: Bjarkarheimr), since the first Bjerkreim Church was built there The first element is the genitive case of bjørk which means "birch". The last element is heimr which means "homestead" or "farm". Before 1889, the name was written "Birkrem".

=== Coat of arms ===
The coat of arms was granted on 11 July 1986. The official blazon is "Vert, a birch branch with six leaves and four catkins argent" (Norwegian: På grøn grunn ein opprett sølv bjørkekvist med sju blad og fire raklar). This means the arms have a green field (background) and the charge is a vertical branch from a birch tree which has six leaves and four catkins. The charge has a tincture of argent which means it is commonly colored white, but if it is made out of metal, then silver is used. The design was chosen since the name of the municipality is derived from the Norwegian word for birch, bjørk, thus the arms are canting. The arms were designed by John Digernes. The municipal flag has the same design as the coat of arms.

=== Churches ===
The Church of Norway has one parish (sokn) within Bjerkreim Municipality. It is part of the Dalane prosti (deanery) in the Diocese of Stavanger.

Churches in Bjerkreim Municipality
Parish (sokn)	Church name	Location of the church	Year built
Bjerkreim	Bjerkreim Church	Røysland	1835
Bjerkreim	Ivesdal Chapel	Øvrebygd	1876

== Government ==
Bjerkreim Municipality is responsible for primary education (through 10th grade), outpatient health services, senior citizen services, welfare and other social services, zoning, economic development, and municipal roads and utilities. The municipality is governed by a municipal council of directly elected representatives. The mayor is indirectly elected by a vote of the municipal council. The municipality is under the jurisdiction of the Sør-Rogaland District Court and the Gulating Court of Appeal.

=== Municipal council ===
The municipal council (Kommunestyre) of Bjerkreim Municipality is made up of 17 representatives that are elected to four-year terms. The executive committee of the council has 5 members, who also make up the authority's planning and economic committee. The mayor of Bjerkreim leads both the council and the executive committee. The tables below show the current and historical composition of the council by political party.

Bjerkreim kommunestyre 2023–2027
Party name (in Nynorsk)	Number of representatives
Labour Party (Arbeidarpartiet)	2
Progress Party (Framstegspartiet)	1
Conservative Party (Høgre)	4
Christian Democratic Party (Kristeleg Folkeparti)	4
Centre Party (Senterpartiet)	3
Bjerkreim Local List (Bjerkreim Bygdeliste)	3
Total number of members:	17

Bjerkreim kommunestyre 2019–2023
Party name (in Nynorsk)	Number of representatives
Labour Party (Arbeidarpartiet)	2
Conservative Party (Høgre)	4
Christian Democratic Party (Kristeleg Folkeparti)	4
Centre Party (Senterpartiet)	6
Liberal Party (Venstre)	1
Total number of members:	17

Bjerkreim kommunestyre 2015–2019
Party name (in Nynorsk)	Number of representatives
Labour Party (Arbeidarpartiet)	2
Progress Party (Framstegspartiet)	1
Conservative Party (Høgre)	4
Christian Democratic Party (Kristeleg Folkeparti)	4
Centre Party (Senterpartiet)	5
Liberal Party (Venstre)	1
Total number of members:	17

Bjerkreim kommunestyre 2011–2015
Party name (in Nynorsk)	Number of representatives
Labour Party (Arbeidarpartiet)	2
Progress Party (Framstegspartiet)	1
Conservative Party (Høgre)	6
Christian Democratic Party (Kristeleg Folkeparti)	3
Centre Party (Senterpartiet)	4
Liberal Party (Venstre)	1
Total number of members:	17

Bjerkreim kommunestyre 2007–2011
Party name (in Nynorsk)	Number of representatives
Labour Party (Arbeidarpartiet)	2
Conservative Party (Høgre)	5
Christian Democratic Party (Kristeleg Folkeparti)	4
Centre Party (Senterpartiet)	5
Liberal Party (Venstre)	1
Total number of members:	17

Bjerkreim kommunestyre 2003–2007
Party name (in Nynorsk)	Number of representatives
Labour Party (Arbeidarpartiet)	2
Conservative Party (Høgre)	5
Christian Democratic Party (Kristeleg Folkeparti)	4
Centre Party (Senterpartiet)	6
Total number of members:	17

Bjerkreim kommunestyre 1999–2003
Party name (in Nynorsk)	Number of representatives
Labour Party (Arbeidarpartiet)	2
Conservative Party (Høgre)	4
Christian Democratic Party (Kristeleg Folkeparti)	5
Centre Party (Senterpartiet)	6
Total number of members:	17

Bjerkreim kommunestyre 1995–1999
Party name (in Nynorsk)	Number of representatives
Labour Party (Arbeidarpartiet)	2
Conservative Party (Høgre)	2
Christian Democratic Party (Kristeleg Folkeparti)	4
Centre Party (Senterpartiet)	9
Total number of members:	17

Bjerkreim kommunestyre 1991–1995
Party name (in Nynorsk)	Number of representatives
Labour Party (Arbeidarpartiet)	2
Conservative Party (Høgre)	2
Christian Democratic Party (Kristeleg Folkeparti)	5
Centre Party (Senterpartiet)	7
Local list (Bygdelista)	1
Total number of members:	17

Bjerkreim kommunestyre 1987–1991
Party name (in Nynorsk)	Number of representatives
Labour Party (Arbeidarpartiet)	2
Conservative Party (Høgre)	3
Christian Democratic Party (Kristeleg Folkeparti)	5
Centre Party (Senterpartiet)	5
Local list (Bygdelista)	2
Total number of members:	17

Bjerkreim kommunestyre 1983–1987
Party name (in Nynorsk)	Number of representatives
Labour Party (Arbeidarpartiet)	2
Conservative Party (Høgre)	2
Christian Democratic Party (Kristeleg Folkeparti)	6
Centre Party (Senterpartiet)	6
Local list (Bygdelista)	1
Total number of members:	17

Bjerkreim kommunestyre 1979–1983
Party name (in Nynorsk)	Number of representatives
Labour Party (Arbeidarpartiet)	1
Conservative Party (Høgre)	4
Christian Democratic Party (Kristeleg Folkeparti)	5
Centre Party (Senterpartiet)	6
Local list (Bygdelista)	1
Total number of members:	17

Bjerkreim kommunestyre 1975–1979
Party name (in Nynorsk)	Number of representatives
Christian Democratic Party (Kristeleg Folkeparti)	5
Centre Party (Senterpartiet)	9
Local list (Bygdelista)	3
Total number of members:	17

Bjerkreim kommunestyre 1971–1975
Party name (in Nynorsk)	Number of representatives
Labour Party (Arbeidarpartiet)	1
Christian Democratic Party (Kristeleg Folkeparti)	5
Centre Party (Senterpartiet)	8
Local List(s) (Lokale lister)	3
Total number of members:	17

Bjerkreim kommunestyre 1967–1971
Party name (in Nynorsk)	Number of representatives
Labour Party (Arbeidarpartiet)	1
Christian Democratic Party (Kristeleg Folkeparti)	4
Centre Party (Senterpartiet)	7
Liberal Party (Venstre)	4
Local List(s) (Lokale lister)	1
Total number of members:	17

Bjerkreim kommunestyre 1963–1967
Party name (in Nynorsk)	Number of representatives
Labour Party (Arbeidarpartiet)	1
Christian Democratic Party (Kristeleg Folkeparti)	3
Centre Party (Senterpartiet)	8
Liberal Party (Venstre)	2
Local List(s) (Lokale lister)	3
Total number of members:	17

Bjerkreim heradsstyre 1959–1963
Party name (in Nynorsk)	Number of representatives
Labour Party (Arbeidarpartiet)	1
Christian Democratic Party (Kristeleg Folkeparti)	2
Centre Party (Senterpartiet)	9
Liberal Party (Venstre)	3
Local List(s) (Lokale lister)	2
Total number of members:	17

Bjerkreim heradsstyre 1955–1959
Party name (in Nynorsk)	Number of representatives
Christian Democratic Party (Kristeleg Folkeparti)	3
Farmers' Party (Bondepartiet)	8
Liberal Party (Venstre)	3
Local List(s) (Lokale lister)	3
Total number of members:	17

Bjerkreim heradsstyre 1951–1955
Party name (in Nynorsk)	Number of representatives
Conservative Party (Høgre)	1
Christian Democratic Party (Kristeleg Folkeparti)	2
Farmers' Party (Bondepartiet)	9
Liberal Party (Venstre)	4
Total number of members:	16

Bjerkreim heradsstyre 1947–1951
Party name (in Nynorsk)	Number of representatives
Labour Party (Arbeidarpartiet)	1
Conservative Party (Høgre)	1
Farmers' Party (Bondepartiet)	10
Liberal Party (Venstre)	4
Total number of members:	16

Bjerkreim heradsstyre 1945–1947
Party name (in Nynorsk)	Number of representatives
Labour Party (Arbeidarpartiet)	2
Local List(s) (Lokale lister)	14
Total number of members:	16

Bjerkreim heradsstyre 1937–1941*
Party name (in Nynorsk)	Number of representatives
Labour Party (Arbeidarpartiet)	2
Conservative Party (Høgre)	2
Joint List(s) of Non-Socialist Parties (Borgarlege Felleslister)	10
Local List(s) (Lokale lister)	2
Total number of members:	16
Note: Due to the German occupation of Norway during World War II, no elections were held for new municipal councils until after the war ended in 1945.

=== Mayors ===
The mayor (Nynorsk: ordførar) of Bjerkreim Municipality is the political leader of the municipality and the chairperson of the municipal council. The following people have held this position:

- 1838–1839: Thønnis Tollefsen Bjerkreim
- 1840–1841: Rasmus Rasmussen Osland
- 1842–1843: Omund Mauritsen Adsem
- 1844–1845: Erik Eriksen Espeland
- 1846–1849: Erik Adamsen Løvbræk
- 1850–1853: Sigbjørn Staalesen Hytland
- 1854–1855: Omund Mauritsen Adsem
- 1856–1865: Christian Larsen Kløgetvedt
- 1866–1869: Ole Villadsen Sagland
- 1870–1879: Christian Larsen Kløgetvedt
- 1880–1881: Jonas Knutsen Vigesaa
- 1882–1893: Tollef Carlsen Laksesvela
- 1894–1897: Tollef Asbjørnsen Gjedrem
- 1898–1899: Tønnes Tollefsen Bjerkrheim
- 1899–1901: Tollef Carlsen Laksesvela
- 1902–1904: Sem Johan Jonassen Vaule
- 1905–1919: Gitle A. Birkrem
- 1920–1922: Peder Carlson Skjæveland
- 1923–1925: Arne Gjedrem
- 1926–1934: Karl Laksesvela
- 1935–1940: Arne Gjedrem
- 1945–1947: Arne Gjedrem
- 1948–1955: Martin Veen
- 1956–1963: Karl L. Skjæveland
- 1964–1966: Martin Veen
- 1966–1975: Tolleiv Gjedrem
- 1976–1979: Lloyd Vaule
- 1980–1993: Olaf Gjedrem (KrF)
- 1994–1999: Gunnhild Vassbø
- 1999–2003: Asbjørn Gjedrem
- 2003–2007: Asbjørn Ramsli (Sp)
- 2007–2015: Marthon Skårland (H)
- 2015–2019: Torbjørn Ognedal (Sp)
- 2019–2023: Kjetil Slettebø (Sp)
- 2023–present: Tone Vaule (Ap)

== Geography ==
Bjerkreim Municipality lies at the northern end of the hilly, rugged Dalane district, just south of the very flat Jæren district. There are several large lakes in Bjerkreim including Austrumdalsvatnet, Birkelandsvatnet, Hofreistæ, and Ørsdalsvatnet. The highest point in the municipality is the 906.99-metre (2,975.7 ft) tall mountain Vinjakula, located on the border with Gjesdal Municipality. The Gloppedalsura skree is located on the Gjesdal-Bjerkreim border.

Gjesdal Municipality is located to the north, Sirdal Municipality (in Agder county) is located to the east, Eigersund Municipality is located to the south, Hå Municipality is located to the west, and Time Municipality is located to the northwest.

=== Climate ===
Climate data for Bjerkreim
Month	Jan	Feb	Mar	Apr	May	Jun	Jul	Aug	Sep	Oct	Nov	Dec	Year
Daily mean °C (°F)	−0.5 (31.1)	−0.6 (30.9)	1.5 (34.7)	4.5 (40.1)	9.5 (49.1)	13.0 (55.4)	14.2 (57.6)	14.3 (57.7)	11.0 (51.8)	8.0 (46.4)	3.5 (38.3)	0.8 (33.4)	6.6 (43.9)
Average precipitation mm (inches)	180 (7.1)	132 (5.2)	152 (6.0)	87 (3.4)	106 (4.2)	115 (4.5)	136 (5.4)	177 (7.0)	240 (9.4)	270 (10.6)	253 (10.0)	217 (8.5)	2,065 (81.3)
Average precipitation days (≥ 1 mm)	14.8	11.0	13.8	10.9	12.7	11.8	11.6	14.3	17.2	17.7	18.4	15.9	170.1
Source: Norwegian Meteorological Institute

== Transportation ==
The main means of transportation to Bjerkreim is via the European route E39 highway which passes through the municipality from south to north. The municipality lies in the southwestern part of the country. The distance to the nearest airport, Stavanger airport in Sola Municipality, is approximately 40 minutes by car.

== Notable people ==
- Knud Spødervold (1791–1848 in Bjerkreim), a lay preacher and leader of the Strong Believers religious movement
- Olaf Gjedrem (born 1948 in Bjerkreim), a politician and mayor of Bjerkreim (1979–1993)
- Ragnar Bjerkreim (born 1958 in Bjerkreim), a composer of film scores
