= Vikeså =

Village in Bjerkreim Municipality, Norway

Vikeså Vigjeså
- Village
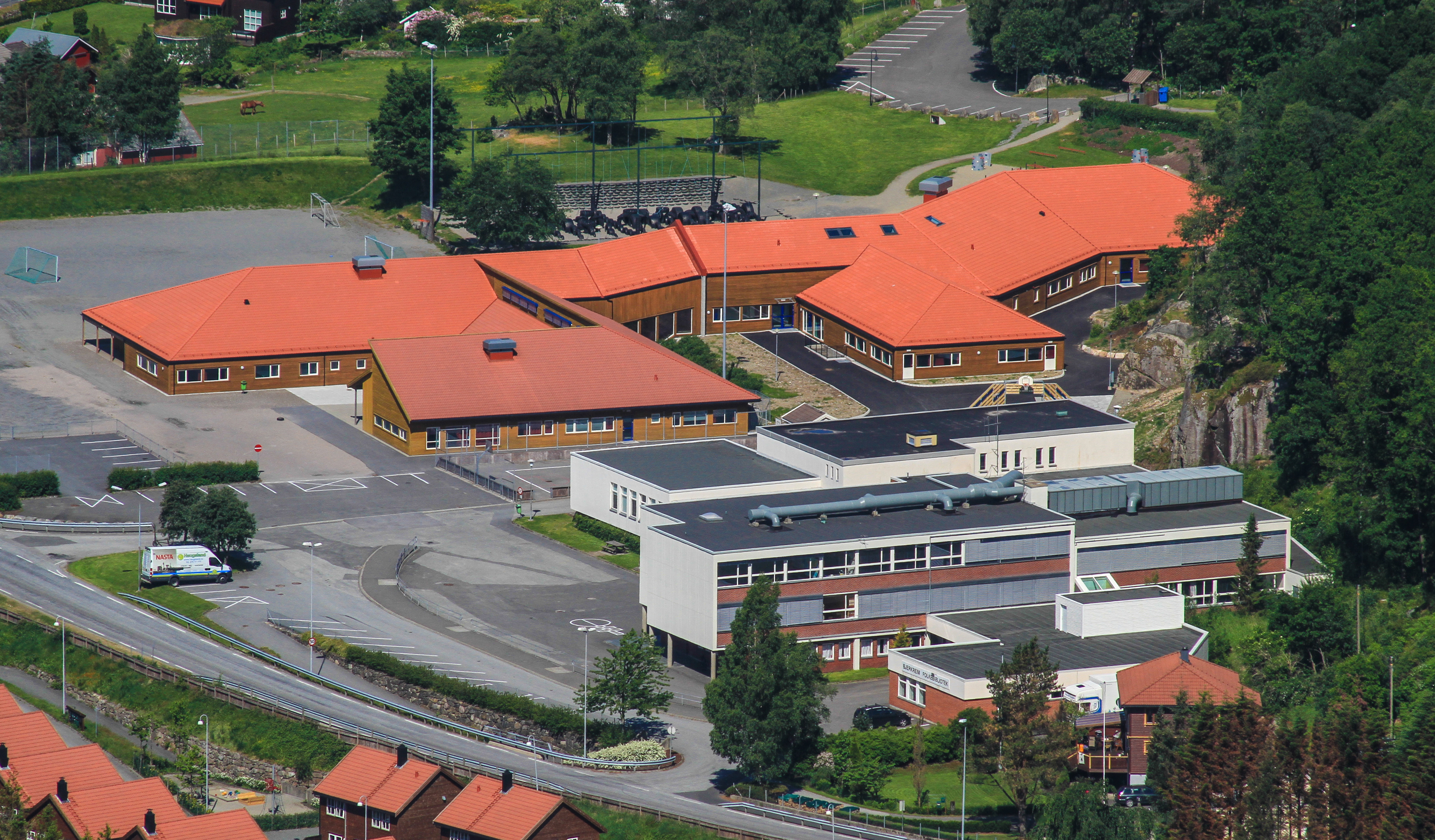
- View of the village school
- Interactive map of Vikeså
- Coordinates: 58.63847°N 6.08868°E
- Country: Norway
- Region: Western Norway
- County: Rogaland
- District: Dalane
- Municipality: Bjerkreim Municipality

Area
  - Total: 0.85 km^{2} (0.33 sq mi)
- Elevation: 88 m (289 ft)

Population (2025)
  - Total: 1,075
  - Density: 1,265/km^{2} (3,280/sq mi)
- Time zone: UTC+01:00 (CET)
  - Summer (DST): UTC+02:00 (CEST)
- Post Code: 4389 Vikeså

Vikeså is the administrative centre of Bjerkreim Municipality in Rogaland county, Norway. The village is located along the European route E39 highway at a crossroads with the village of Ålgård about 20 kilometres (12 mi) to the northwest, the village of Dirdal (in Gjesdal Municipality) about 25 kilometres (16 mi) to the northeast, and the town of Egersund about 20 kilometres (12 mi) to the south. The smaller village of Røysland lies about 7 kilometres (4.3 mi) to the south. The lake Svelavatnet lies along the south side of the village.

The 0.85-square-kilometre (210-acre) village has a population (2025) of 1,075 and a population density of 1,265 inhabitants per square kilometre (3,280/sq mi). The village is the largest village in the municipality. It is the seat of the municipal council and the main commercial area in the municipality including a Coop Extra store.
