= Røysland, Rogaland =

Village in Bjerkreim Municipality, Norway

Røysland Bjerkreim
- Village
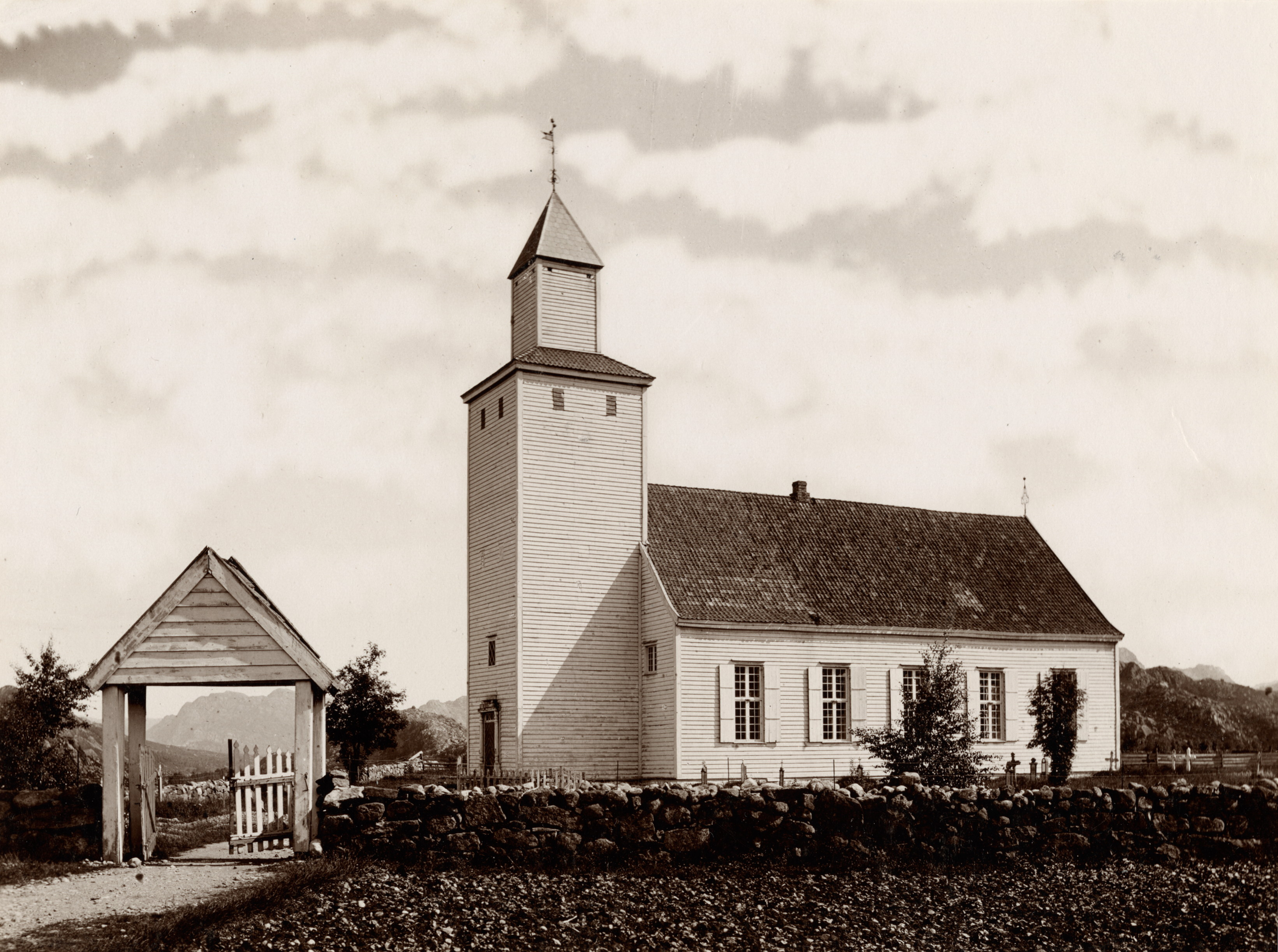
- View of the village church (c. 1900)
- Interactive map of Røysland
- Coordinates: 58.58363°N 6.06974°E
- Country: Norway
- Region: Western Norway
- County: Rogaland
- District: Dalane
- Municipality: Bjerkreim Municipality

Area
  - Total: 0.4 km^{2} (0.15 sq mi)
- Elevation: 58 m (190 ft)

Population (2024)
  - Total: 529
  - Density: 1,323/km^{2} (3,430/sq mi)
- Time zone: UTC+01:00 (CET)
  - Summer (DST): UTC+02:00 (CEST)
- Post Code: 4387 Bjerkreim

Røysland is a village in Bjerkreim Municipality in Rogaland county, Norway. The village is located along the European route E39 highway about 7 kilometres (4.3 mi) south of the municipal centre of Vikeså. The river Bjerkreimselva runs through the village, right past Bjerkreim Church, the main church for the municipality.

The 0.4-square-kilometre (99-acre) village has a population (2024) of 529 and a population density of 1,323 inhabitants per square kilometre (3,430/sq mi).
