= Bjerkreim Church =

Church in Rogaland, Norway

- Bjerkreim kyrkje
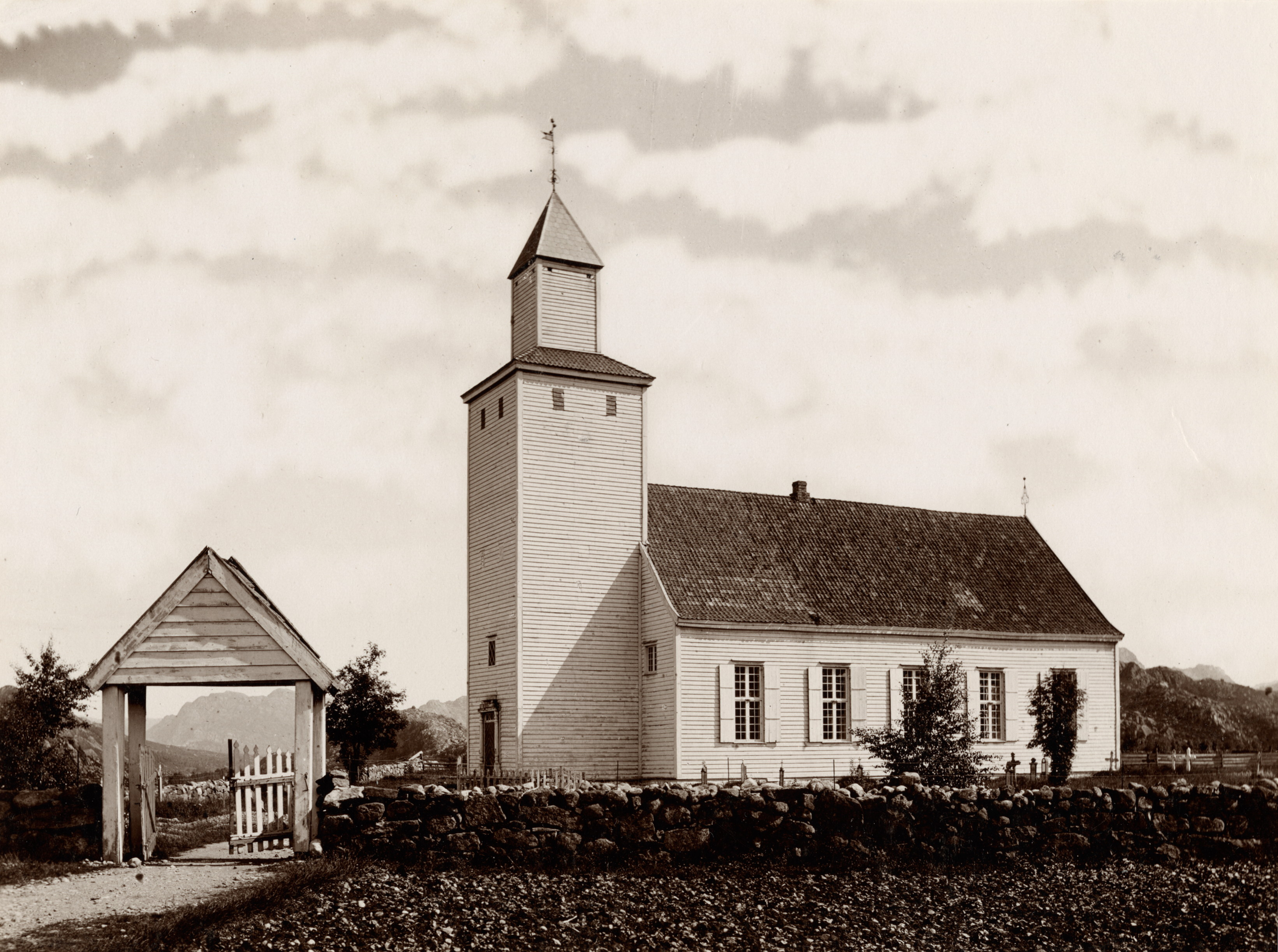
- View of the church
- Bjerkreim Church
- 58.5837°N 6.07686°E
- Location: Bjerkreim Municipality, Rogaland
- Country: Norway
- Denomination: Church of Norway
- Churchmanship: Evangelical Lutheran

History
- Status: Parish church
- Founded: 13th century

Architecture
- Functional status: Active
- Architect: Hans Linstow
- Architectural type: Long church
- Completed: 1835

Specifications
- Capacity: 410
- Materials: Wood

Administration
- Diocese: Stavanger bispedømme
- Deanery: Dalane prosti
- Parish: Bjerkreim
- Norwegian Cultural Heritage Site
- Type: Church
- Status: Automatically protected
- ID: 83896

Bjerkreim Church (Norwegian: Bjerkreim kirke) is a parish church of the Church of Norway in Bjerkreim Municipality in Rogaland county, Norway. It is located in the village of Bjerkreim. It is one of the two churches for the Bjerkreim parish which is part of the Dalane prosti (deanery) in the Diocese of Stavanger. The white, wooden church was built in a long church style in 1835 using designs by the architect Hans Linstow. The church seats about 410 people.

== History ==
The earliest existing historical records of the church date back to the year 1388, but it was likely built during the late 13th century. The first church was located along the river Bjerkreimselva, about 100 metres (330 ft) southwest of the present church site. In 1628, the church burned down and it was replaced by a small timber-framed church.

In 1814, this church served as an election church (Norwegian: valgkirke). Together with more than 300 other parish churches across Norway, it was a polling station for elections to the 1814 Norwegian Constituent Assembly which wrote the Constitution of Norway. This was Norway's first national elections. Each church parish was a constituency that elected people called "electors" who later met together in each county to elect the representatives for the assembly that was to meet at Eidsvoll Manor later that year.

In 1835, a new paneled timber church was built a short distance to the northeast. After the new church was completed, the old church was torn down and its materials were auctioned off.

== See also ==
- List of churches in Rogaland
