= 2024 Finneidfjord train derailment =

Rail accident in Norway

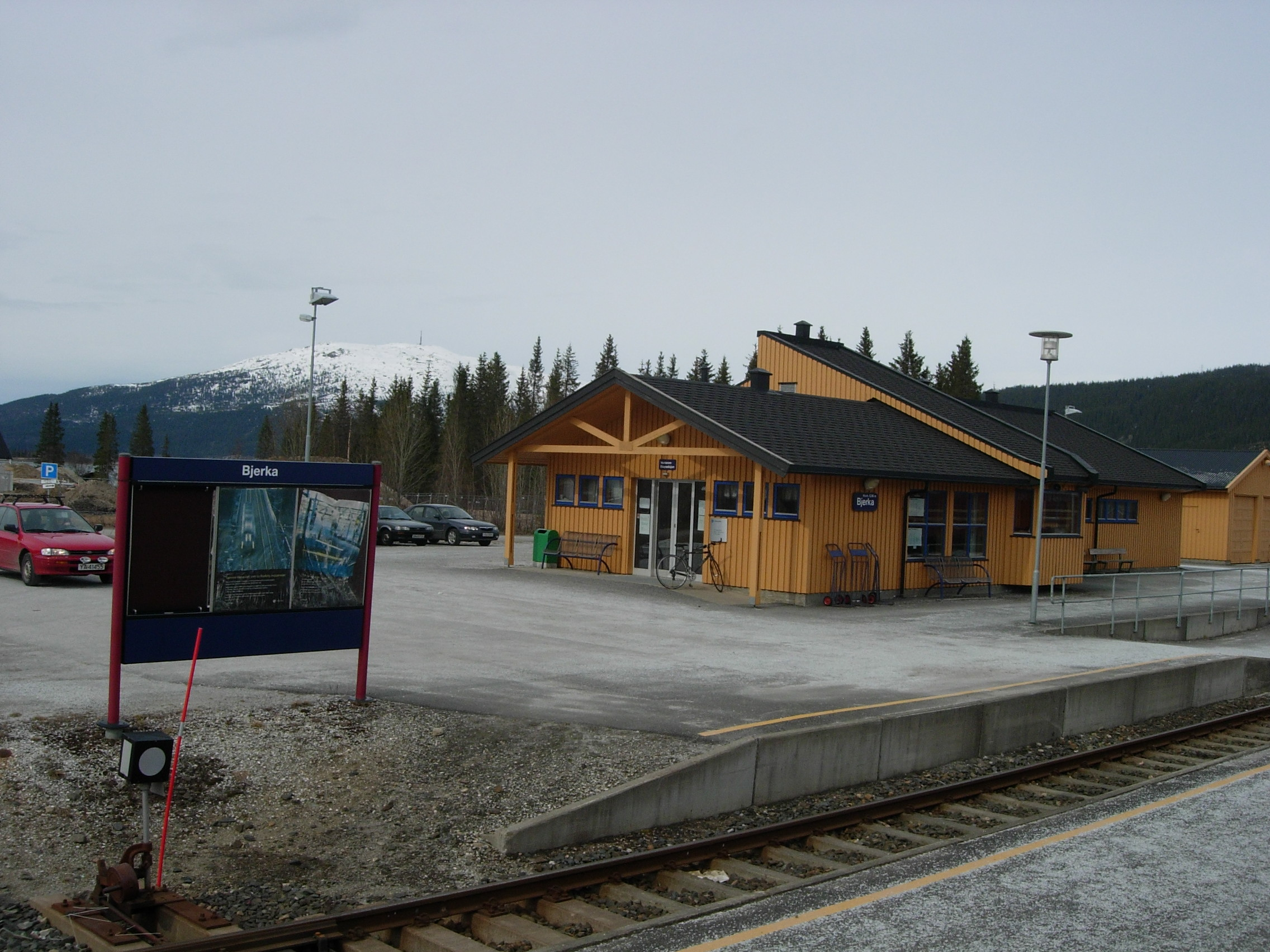
- The train passed Bjerka Station and was on its way to Finneidfjord when it derailed

Details
- Date: 24 October 2024; 14:15 CEST
- Location: Between Bjerka Station and Finneidfjord
- Coordinates: 66.176056°N 13.812333°E
- Country: Norway
- Line: Nordland Line
- Operator: SJ Norge
- Incident type: Train accident
- Cause: Rock slide

Statistics
- Passengers: 46
- Crew: The train driver, the conductor and the café host
- Deaths: Rolf Henry Ankersen (the train driver)
- Injured: Four passengers, slight injuries

The 2024 Finneidfjord train derailment was a train accident on the Nordland Line that took place on 24 October 2024. The accident took place between Bjerka Station and Finneidfjord and led to the death of the train driver and the injury of four passengers. The train was carrying 46 passengers, plus 3 staff members, adding up to a total of 49 souls on board.

Both European route E6 and Nordland Line were closed as a result of the accident. With the E6 being the only continuous road and the Nordland Line the only railway line in northern Norway, the country was essentially cut in two. The removal of the train was completed on 5 November 2024, with the E6 being reopened the following day. Nordland Line was reopened on 30 November 2024.

== Background ==
There have been several landslides in the area since 1984. During the construction of the Finneidfjord tunnel, a large beach zone landslide occurred on 20 June 1996 at Tuvsletta in Sørfjorden in Hemnes municipality, just south-west of the tunnel.

In the following days, traffic along European route E6 had to be routed via the Norwegian national road 73 in Grane and Hattfjelldal, the Blue Highway through Storuman municipality in Sweden and European route E12 westwards to Mo i Rana.

After 1996, 31 landslide incidents have been recorded in the area from Bjerka to Finneidfjord. What triggered the train derailment was the 32nd registration. According to Bane NOR, there have been 863 mudslides and rock falls on Norwegian railways since 2014, with the Nordland Line being the worst.

Almost at the same location as the 2024 derailment, a minor accident occurred with passenger train no. 474 on 3 October 2016. At that time, the southbound evening train from Bodø drove into a 1 m^{3} boulder. When the train hit the boulder, it derailed with one single bogie. This train was carrying 14 passengers and two people were injured.

The Norwegian Safety Investigation Authority wrote in May 2017 that the area had been checked and protected against landslides and rockfall by Bane NOR. The next check was to be carried out in 2023.

== The train ==
Passenger train no. 471 consisted of:

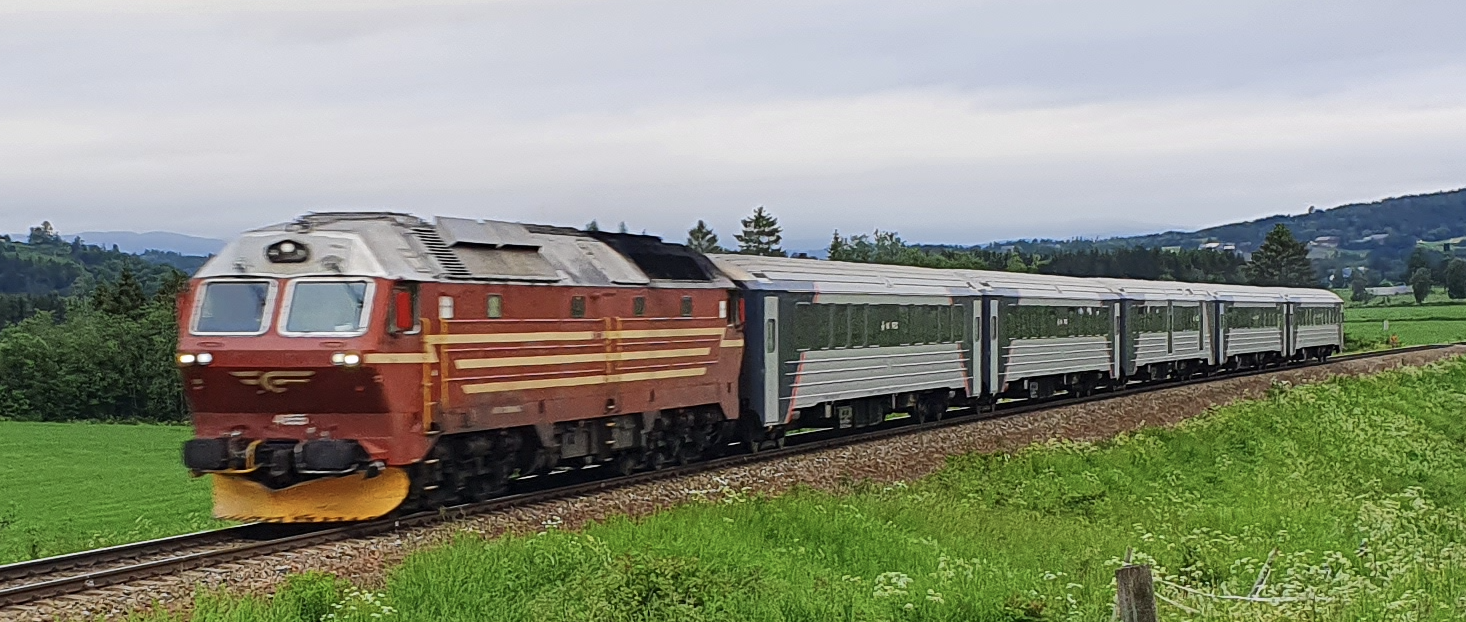
Train no. 472 at Sparbu in Steinkjer municipality in June 2022. Same type equipment as the accident train.

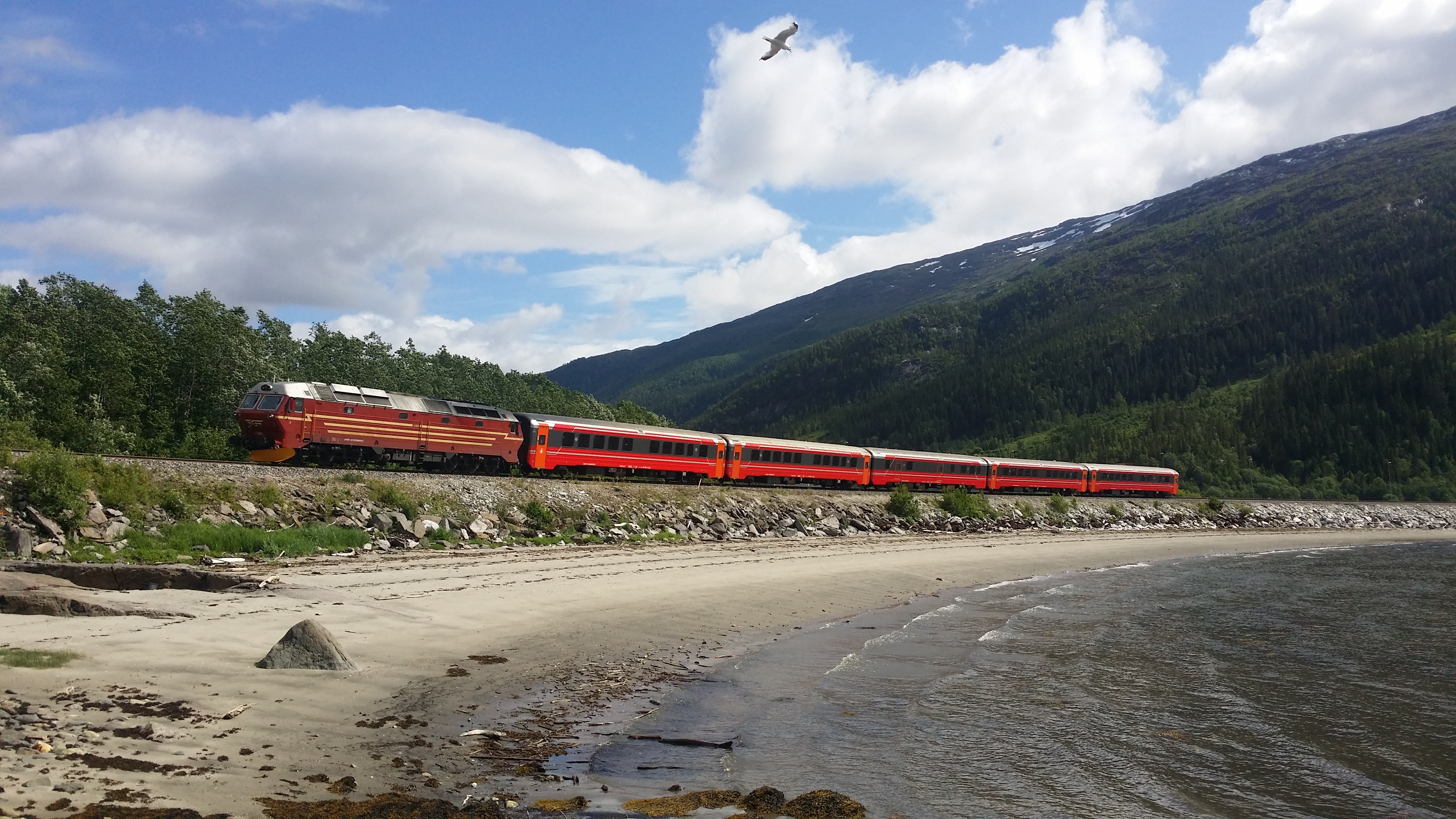
The day train from Trondheim to Bodø, south of Mo i Rana in June 2019. It was a similar train which derailed.

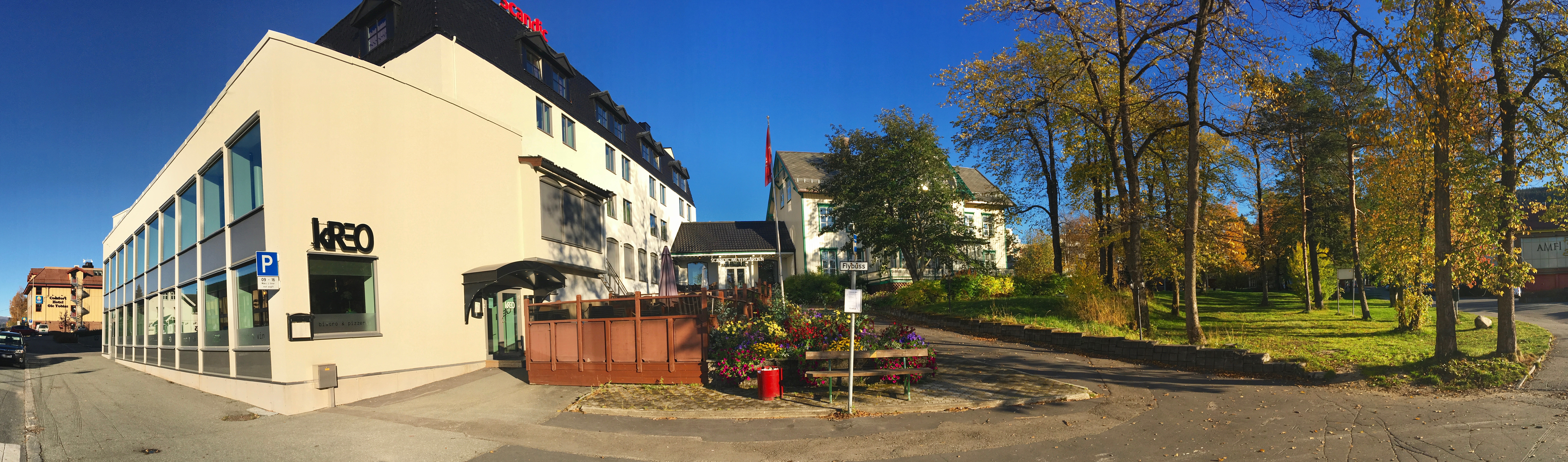
Scandic Meyergården hotell in October 2017. The hotel was used as a reception center for evacuees and relatives.

- Locomotive Di 4.653 (derailed and overturned)
- B5-7 26041 (derailed)
- BC5 26045 (derailed)
- B5 26037 (partially derailed)
- FR5 21722
- B5 26022

The train was staffed by the locomotive driver, the conductor and the café host; 46 passengers were on board.

== Incident ==
On 24 October 2024, a northbound passenger train from Trondheim to Bodø derailed following a rock slide which left large boulders on the track between Bjerka station and Finneidfjord, south of Mo i Rana Station, 472 km north of Trondhjem. The train left Trondheim at 07:49 CEST and passed Bjerka around 14:07. The locomotive and one wagon slid down a slope; The front part of the train ended up dangling down, alongside the embankment. The locomotive's nose landed on the edge of the E6 and debris were scattered across the road.

The Norwegian police received a report about the derailment at 14:15. Emergency services and an AgustaWestland AW101 rescue helicopter worked to evacuate the passengers, all of which were evacuated by 16:30.

That day, the train driver was found dead; 60-year-old Rolf Henry Ankersen from Mosjøen. Four passengers were taken to hospital with minor injuries. Helgeland Hospital Trust went into red alert, but soon returned to normal operations. Reception centers were set up for evacuees and relatives in Scandic Meyergården hotell in Mo i Rana and in Mosjøen. Hemnes municipality and Bane NOR set up a crisis team and the Norwegian Safety Investigation Authority sent a team to the accident site on 25 October.

== Aftermath ==
=== Detour for road traffic ===
The accident severed Norway's main arterial road, the E6, cutting Norway in two. One detour, using FV17, involved a ferry ship crossing between Levang and Nesna, with very long waiting times. The other detour ran along FV73 and European route E12, through Sweden. Both detours were lengthy and costly. On top of the closing of E6, both detours have also been closed at times, due to bad weather and traffic accidents.

A car with three Norwegians crashed into the back of a stopped truck on the detour road Blå Vägen, European route E12, between Bredviken and Kåtaviken, in Sweden, on 31 October 2024. One of the occupants died in hospital a few days later.

=== Boat ride ===
A local couple transported people from Kivika across the fjord in their own boat, performing over 200 trips prior to 26 October. A digital fundraising campaign was started to support the couple, though the service was taken over by the municipality on 28 October.

=== Consequences of Norway being cut in two ===
Norway's main road was closed and Norway was once again cut in two as a result of this accident. Postal service Posten announced on Wednesday 30 October 2024 that letters and packages were delayed, due to many closed railways and roads. NRK published an article about at least 5 disturbances due to the closure of E6:

- 1) Widerøe's airplanes got delayed, because the airport in Mo i Rana could no longer supply enough fuel for non-stop flights, so extra stop over landings were needed;
- 2) Coop's grocery shops were struggling to get food stocks delivered in time;
- 3) A meat factory in Bjerka had to lay off staff, or find alternative rooms for their seasonal workers who would normally be sleeping in Finneidfjord;
- 4) Letters and parcels sent by mail were one or 2 days late; and
- 5) Truck drivers got into trouble, because the long detours they had to make were not matching with the legal requirement to respect their maximum driving time and take enough breaks and nightly rest. This contributed much to the delivery problems.

=== Removal of the train ===
The E6 and Nordland Line were closed at the scene of the accident, remaining closed for several days during the investigation, clean-up and repair of the damage. Geologists were unsure whether the train would slip further towards the E6 due to the incline of the slope and the amount of rainfall at the time.

The Norwegian Safety Investigation Authority arrived on the day of the incident and left the site on 26 October. On 25 October, representatives from Bane NOR started planning to remove the train, beginning the removal the following day. Using cranes and a work train, FR5 21722 and B5 26022 were taken to Bjerka on 26 October. The area was briefly evacuated on 27 October due to falling rocks, though work continued the following day, with B5 26037 being taken to Bjerka. The three were later taken to a workshop in Trondheim.

Bane NOR announced on Sunday 27 October 2024 that they had to interrupt their attempts to clear the train wreck, because the mountain slope was still moving. On 26 October 2024 Statens Vegvesen had made an announcement about reopening E6, but that turned out to be too optimistic, when Statens Vegvesen announced on 28 October 2024 that E6 would remain closed until at least Friday 1 November 2024, with a new evaluation of the situation scheduled for Thursday 31 October 2024.

30 cubic metres of loose vegetation were removed from the site on 28 October, with parts of the boulder above the train being removed using explosives and airbags the following day. The rest of the stone was removed on 30 October.

Storm Jakob, which triggered red alerts south of Trondheim, had aggravated the landslide risk, delaying the removal of the locomotive. An orange alert was issued locally on 29 October, with high winds preventing the installation of cranes at the site.

BC5 26045 and B5-7 26041 were removed by crane on 3 and 4 November 2024, with the locomotive being removed on 5 November.

=== Reopening of the E6 and the Nordland Line ===
The E6 opened temporarily on 3 November at 21:00 CET due to bad weather and difficult driving conditions on the E12. The E6 remained open until 5 November at 07:00, officially reopening the following day. The Nordland Line was expected to reopen on 18 November, however Bane NOR published a press release on 11 November 2024, stating that the reopening date was unknown due to ongoing work to protect the railway line from falling rocks. Goods trains were allowed on the line on 30 November, with passenger services reopening on 2 December. Since the locomotive that was involved in the crash was written off, a serious shortage of locomotives was however severely hampering train services on the Nordland railway line.

== See also ==
- Train wreck on E6 near Finneidfjord, impact on road transport
- Shortage of locomotives on Nordland railway line
