= Stormyrbassenget =

Lake in Hemnes, Norway

Stormyrbassenget Stormyraven Avan
- Interactive map of the lake
- Location: Hemnes Municipality, Nordland
- Coordinates: 65.9649°N 13.7902°E
- Basin countries: Norway
- Max. length: 4.5 kilometres (2.8 mi)
- Max. width: 3 kilometres (1.9 mi)
- Surface area: 6.48 km^{2} (2.50 sq mi)
- Shore length^{1}: 42.65 kilometres (26.50 mi)
- Surface elevation: 248 metres (814 ft)
- References: NVE
- ^{1} Shore length is not a well-defined measure.

Stormyrbassenget, also known as Stormyraven or Avan, is a lake in Hemnes Municipality in Nordland county, Norway. It lies about 12 kilometres (7.5 mi) south of the municipal center of Korgen and about 4 kilometres (2.5 mi) north of the village of Bleikvasslia. The lake lies along the river Røssåga as it flows north to the Ranfjord.

== See also ==
- List of lakes in Norway
- Geography of Norway
