= Juvik =

Juvik is a surname (although unknown) which is maybe created around Norway. Notable people with the surname include:

- Kjell-Idar Juvik (born 1966), Norwegian politician
- Sonia Juvik (born 197?) Professor Emerita, Geography & Environmental Studies at University of Hawai'i at Hilo
- Sverre Johan Juvik (1922–2015), Norwegian politician
