= Finneidfjord =

Village in Hemnes Municipality, Norway

- Village
- Interactive map of Finneidfjord
- Location within Nordland Location within Norway
- Coordinates: 66.1878°N 13.7920°E
- Country: Norway
- Region: Northern Norway
- County: Nordland
- District: Helgeland
- Municipality: Hemnes Municipality

Area
  - Total: 0.66 km^{2} (0.25 sq mi)
- Elevation: 35 m (115 ft)

Population (2012)
  - Total: 405
  - Density: 614/km^{2} (1,590/sq mi)
- Time zone: UTC+01:00 (CET)
  - Summer (DST): UTC+02:00 (CEST)
- Post Code: 8642 Finneidfjord

Finneidfjord is a small village in Hemnes Municipality in Nordland county, Norway. It is located on a small isthmus, about halfway between the villages of Hemnesberget and Bjerka. The European route E6 highway and the Nordland Line pass through the village.

The 0.66-square-kilometre (160-acre) village had a population (2012) of 405 and a population density of 614 inhabitants per square kilometre (1,590/sq mi). Since 2012, the population and area data for this village area has not been separately tracked by Statistics Norway.

== Landslide in 1996 ==
On the night from the 19th to the 20th June 1996, around 0h30, a large quick clay landslide took place in Finneidfjord. Two residential houses and 300 metres of E6 road disappeared into the sea. NRK came back to Finneidfjord 20 years later, interviewed people who were involved in the landslide and wrote an article to commemorate the disaster. One man, who lost his house in 1996, called the landslide an open wound, still soaring in 2016, as nobody was held responsible for the landslide. It remains unknown if blasting explosions for the building of a new tunnel in E6 have played a role in this landslide. Quick clay can be found in many places in Norway. Quick clay is normally solid but can become fluid and form landslides when under pressure or otherwise disturbed.

== Train accident in 2024 ==
In 2024, on October 24th, a passenger-train-derailment happened near the village. The cause was probably a sudden rock slide, which hit the train and blocked the rails.
