= Stormålvatnet =

Lake in Hemnes, Norway

- Interactive map of the lake
- Location: Hemnes Municipality, Nordland
- Coordinates: 66.1019°N 14.0971°E
- Catchment area: Bjerkaelva
- Basin countries: Norway
- Max. length: 5 kilometres (3.1 mi)
- Max. width: 2 kilometres (1.2 mi)
- Surface area: 7.08 km^{2} (2.73 sq mi)
- Shore length^{1}: 15.55 kilometres (9.66 mi)
- Surface elevation: 430 metres (1,410 ft)
- References: NVE
- ^{1} Shore length is not a well-defined measure.

Stormålvatnet is a lake in Hemnes Municipality in Nordland county, Norway. It is located about 12 kilometres (7.5 mi) east of the village of Korgen. The river Bjerkaelva flows through the lake on its way to the nearby Ranfjorden.

== See also ==
- List of lakes in Norway
- Geography of Norway
