= Hemnes Church =

Church in Nordland, Norway

- Hemnes kirke
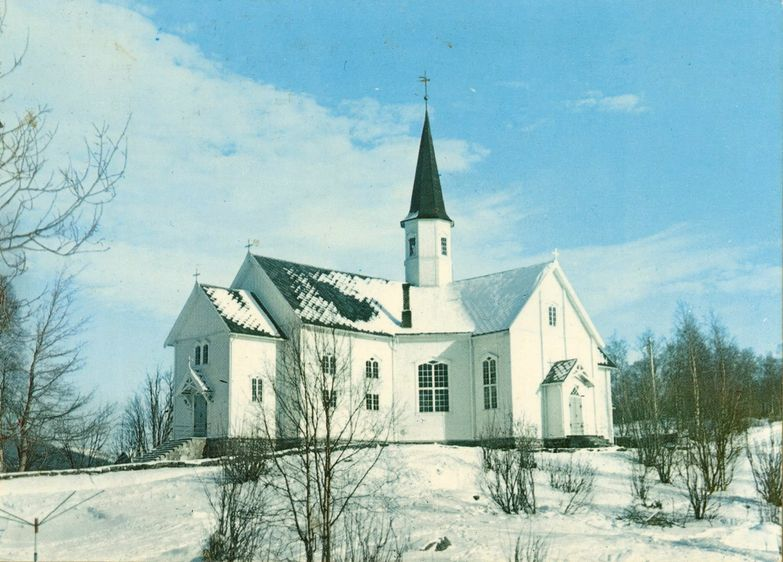
- View of the church
- Hemnes Church
- 66.2257835°N 13.6118647°E
- Location: Hemnes Municipality, Nordland
- Country: Norway
- Denomination: Church of Norway
- Churchmanship: Evangelical Lutheran

History
- Status: Parish church
- Founded: 15th century
- Consecrated: 1872

Architecture
- Functional status: Active
- Architect: Niels S.D. Eckhoff
- Architectural type: Cruciform/Octagonal
- Completed: 1872 (154 years ago)

Specifications
- Capacity: 800
- Materials: Wood

Administration
- Diocese: Sør-Hålogaland
- Deanery: Indre Helgeland prosti
- Parish: Hemnes
- Norwegian Cultural Heritage Site
- Type: Church
- Status: Listed
- ID: 84544

Hemnes Church (Norwegian: Hemnes kirke) is a parish church of the Church of Norway in Hemnes Municipality in Nordland county, Norway. It is located in the village of Hemnesberget. It is the church for the Hemnes parish which is part of the Indre Helgeland prosti (deanery) in the Diocese of Sør-Hålogaland. The white, wooden church was built in an octagonal-cruciform style in 1872 using plans drawn up by the architect Niels Stockfleth Darre Eckhoff. The church seats about 800 people.

== History ==
The earliest existing historical records of the church date back to the year 1589, but the church was not new that year. The old church building was torn down and replaced in 1658 with a new log building. The church was a cruciform design with a steeple rising from the center. Nearly one hundred years later in 1742, the old church was replaced again. The 1742 church was demolished in 1872 and replaced with the present church building. The new church was built slightly to the south of where the previous church stood. There was a cemetery located on the church grounds for centuries, but it has not been used since 1886 when a new cemetery was established to the northeast of the church.

== See also ==
- List of churches in Sør-Hålogaland
