= Korgfjell Tunnel =

Road tunnel in Nordland county, Norway

Korgfjell Tunnel Korgfjelltunnelen
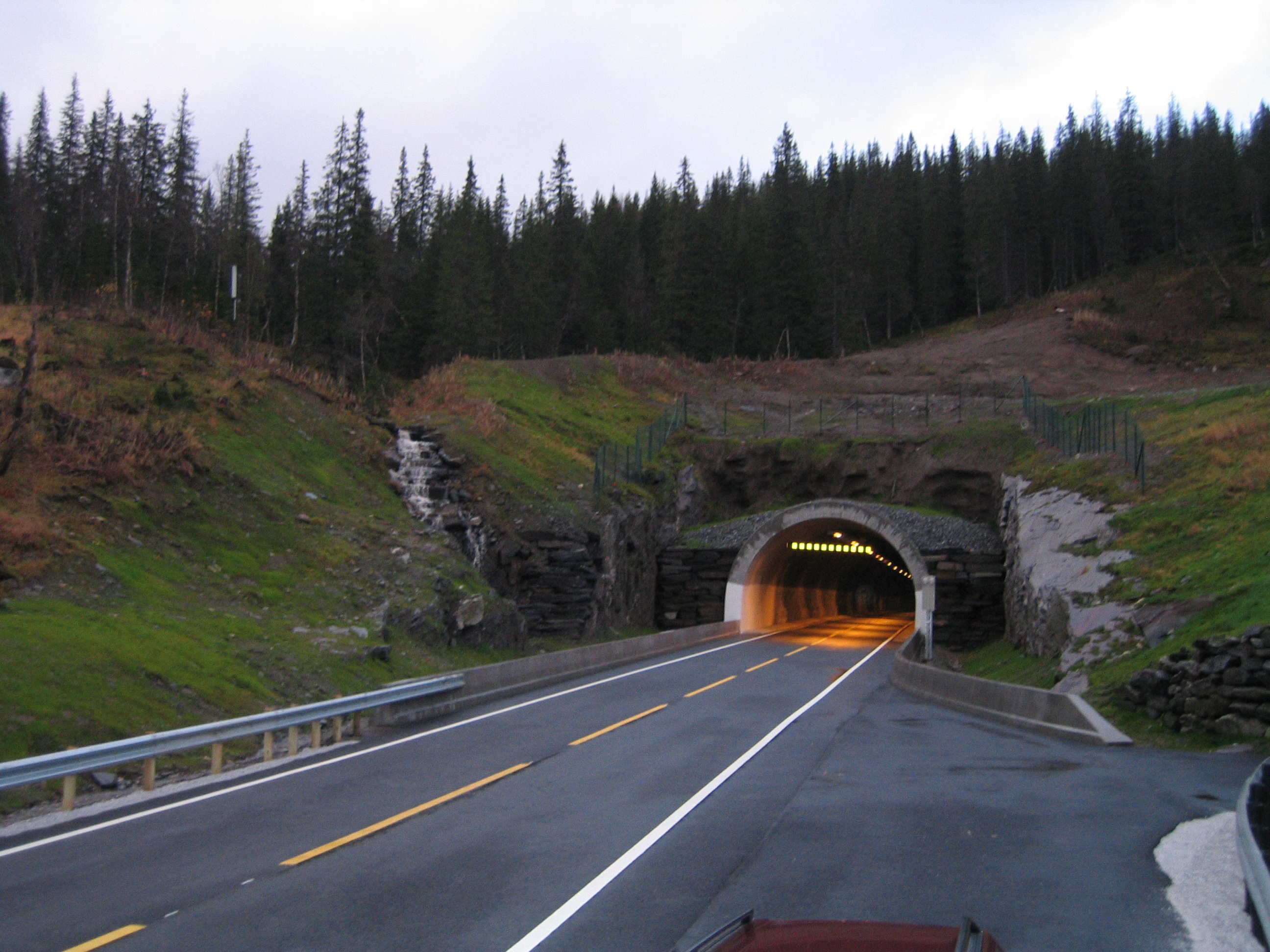
- Southern entrance in Vefsn Municipality
- Interactive map of Korgfjell Tunnel; Korgfjelltunnelen

Overview
- Location: Nordland, Norway
- Coordinates: 66.0583°N 13.6865°E
- Route: E6
- Start: Hemnes Municipality; 66°2′52″N 13°38′0″E
- End: Vefsn Municipality; 66°4′27″N 13°48′31″E

Operation
- Work began: 2001
- Opened: 16 September 2005
- Traffic: Automotive

Technical
- Length: 8,530 metres (5.30 mi)

The Korgfjell Tunnel (Norwegian: Korgfjelltunnelen) is an 8,530-metre (5.30 mi) long road tunnel in Nordland county, Norway. The tunnel connects Knutli in Vefsn Municipality with the village of Korgen in Hemnes Municipality. Work on the tunnel started in September 2001 and it was opened on 16 September 2005.

The tunnel replaced a narrow, steep, twisting mountain road and shortened the European route E6 highway by 4 kilometres (2.5 mi). The travel time was shortened by 10–20 minutes. Before the tunnel, trucks with trailers were often stuck going uphill or downhill in snowy conditions, blocking the road. The place was considered one of the worst places on the E6 highway. The mountain road which reaches 560 meters (1,840 ft) in altitude was built by the Germans during World War II, replacing a ferry connection at Elsfjord. The cost of the tunnel, including new roads at both ends, was about 450 million kr.

== Gallery ==
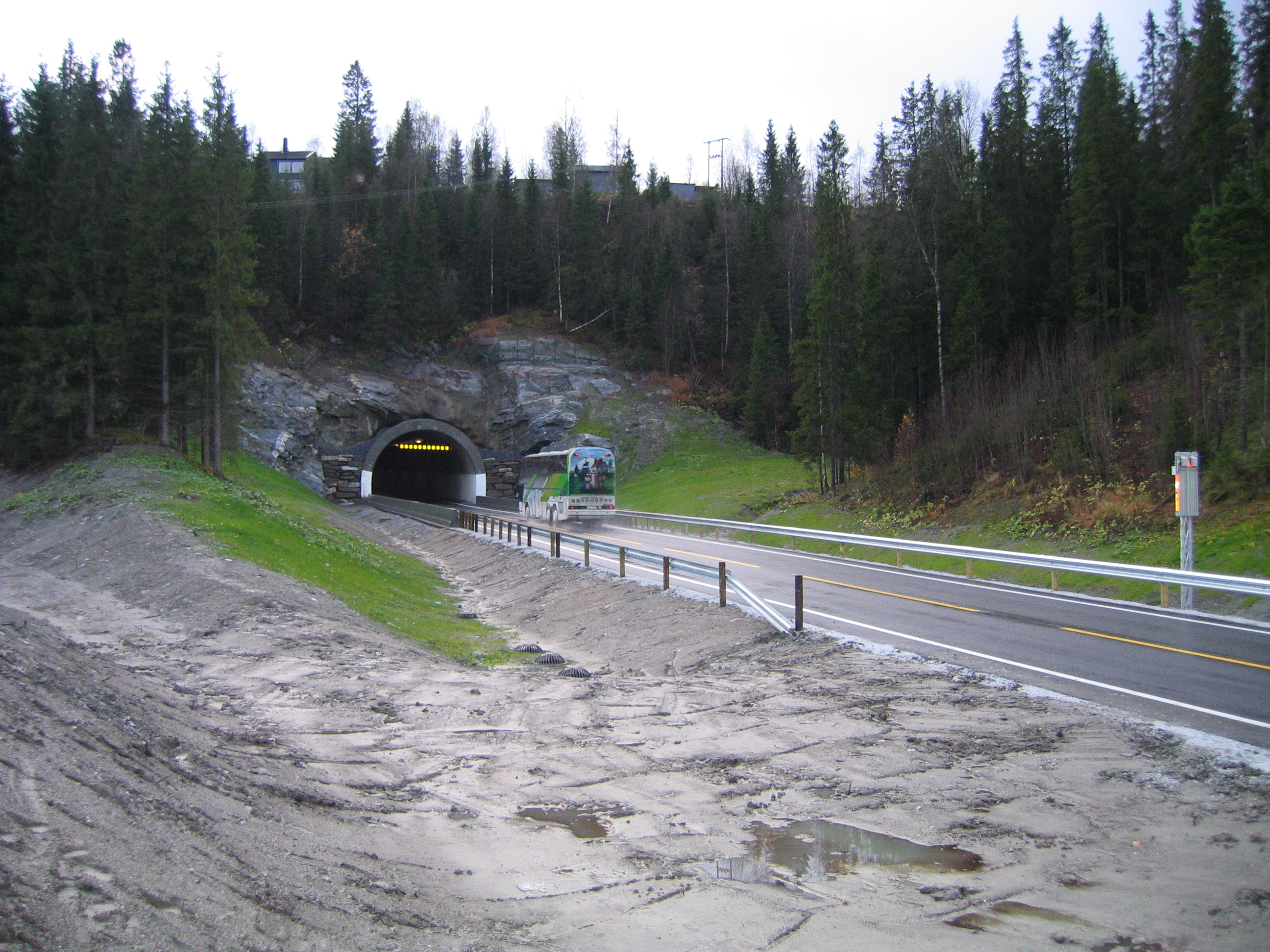
Korgen entrance in Hemnes Municipality

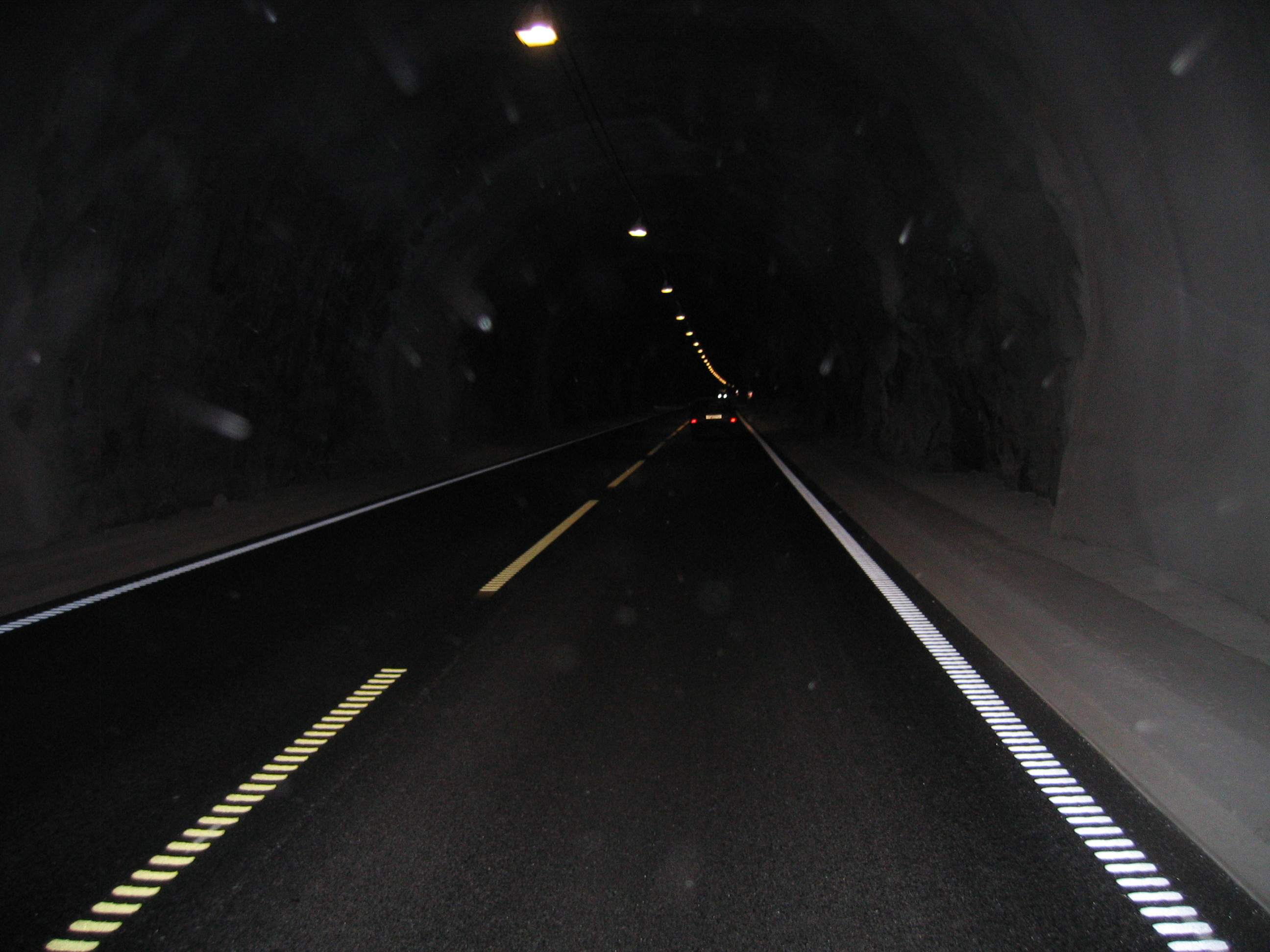
Interior view

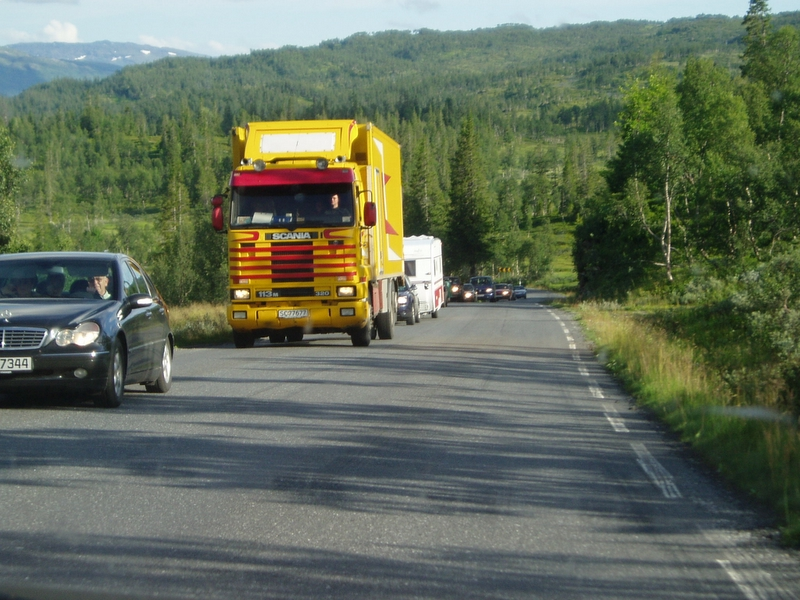
The old road over Korgfjellet mountain
