= SS Nordnorge (1923) =

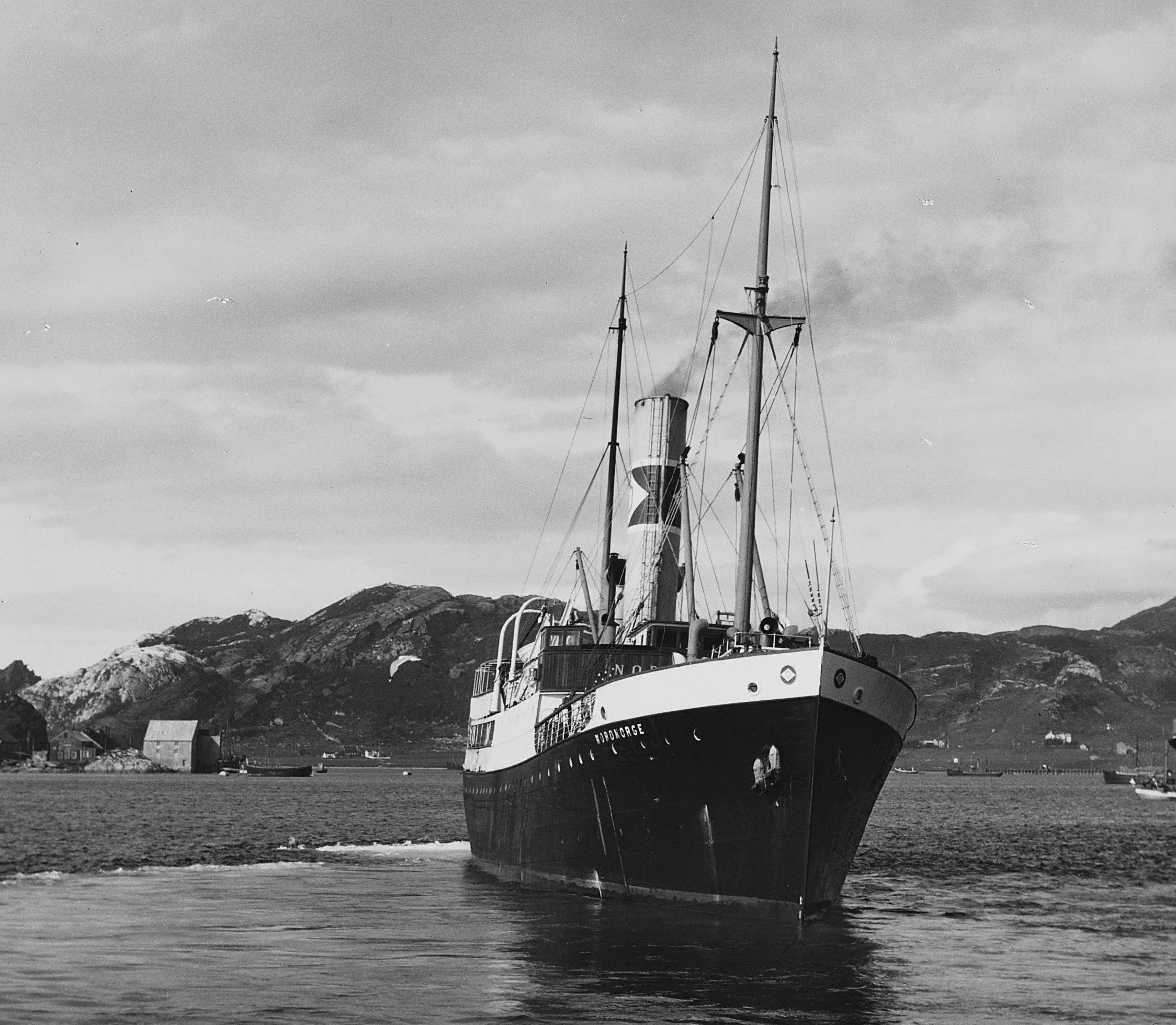
- Nordnorge in Bodø in 1928

History
- Name: Nordnorge
- Namesake: Northern Norway
- Owner: Ofotens Dampskibsselskap
- Port of registry: Narvik
- Route: Narvik-Trondheim (1924–1936); Hurtigruten (1936–1940)
- Builder: Trondhjems mekaniske Værksted
- Yard number: 186
- Laid down: September 1922
- Launched: 12 September 1923
- Completed: 17 January 1924
- Acquired: 18 January 1924
- Identification: Code letters: LDHR; (1930); LHNR; (1934–1939)
- Captured: by the Germans on 7 May 1940
- Fate: Sunk by Royal Navy warships on 10 May 1940

General characteristics
- Type: Cargo liner (1924–1940); Troop ship (1940)
- Tonnage: As built: 873 gross register tons (GRT); 448 net register tons (NRT); After 1936 rebuild: 991 GRT; 556 NRT
- Length: As built: 181 feet (55 m); After 1936 rebuild: 201 feet (61 m)
- Beam: 9 metres (30 ft)
- Depth: As built: 21 ft (6.4 m); After 1936 rebuild: 19.6 ft (6.0 m)
- Installed power: 1,000 indicated horsepower
- Propulsion: Triple expansion steam engine
- Speed: 12 knots (22 km/h; 14 mph)
- Capacity: 270 passengers
- Armament: 7–10 May 1940: Two 20 mm automatic cannon and; two machine guns

SS Nordnorge was a Norwegian steamship built in 1923–24 by Trondhjems mekaniske Værksted, for the Narvik-based Norwegian shipping company Ofotens Dampskibsselskap. First employed on the company's Narvik-Trondheim route, she was transferred to the longer Hurtigruten route in late 1936. Seized by the Germans following their April 1940 attack on Norway, she was used as covert troop ship and was sunk shortly after delivering her cargo of German troops behind Allied lines on 10 May 1940.

The ship was located in 2021, and was filmed later that year.

== Construction ==
Nordnorge was ordered by Ofotens Dampskibsselskap to serve the company's Narvik-Trondheim route. She was built at Trondhjems mekaniske Værksted in Trondheim, Norway. She was laid down in September 1922 with yard number 186, and was originally intended to be called Solstrålen, although the name was changed before launch. She was launched on 12 September 1923, and completed on 17 January 1924, being delivered to her owners the next day. Nordnorge was considered a beautiful vessel, and was one of the last of the traditional coastal cargo liners to be built in Norway.

As built she had a tonnage of 873 gross register tons or 448 net register tons, a length on 181 feet (55 m), a depth of 21 ft (6.4 m) and a beam of 9 metres (30 ft). Her 1,000 indicated horsepower triple expansion steam engine propelled her at 12 knots (22 km/h; 14 mph). She was built with a promenade deck above the main deck, and was divided into three classes. The First Class section was aft, Second Class amidships and Third Class in the bow area. Nordnorge was licensed to carry 270 passengers in coastal traffic.

== Early coastal service ==
For the first 12 years of her existence, Nordnorge sailed between Trondheim and Narvik. She would depart Trondheim at 12:00 on Tuesdays and carry passengers and cargo to the coastal towns on her way north to Narvik and back again. She corresponded with Troms Fylkes Dampskibsselskap's Lødingen-Tromsø route. Until the delivery of Nordnorge, the Trondheim-Narvik route had been served by the older and slower steamer Barøy, without the call in Lødingen. In 1930 she was assigned the code letters LDHR. By 1934 these had changed to LENR, and remained so until at least 1939.

== Rebuild and Hurtigruten service ==
In the fall of 1935 Ofotens Dampskibsselskap began negotiations with the Norwegian Ministry of Transport and Communications with the intent on taking part in the expansion of the coastal Hurtigruten service along the Norwegian coast. The negotiations were concluded successfully on 1 November 1936, with Ofotens Dampskibsselskap gaining a contract and Narvik being included in the Hurtigruten route. Nordnorge was designated as the company's ship on Hurtigruten service. Compared to the other companies ships on the service, she was both small and slow. Nordnorge was the only of the ships on the Hurtigruten service to retain the old three-class system, with all the other ships having dispensed of the Second Class.

During 1936 Nordnorge was rebuilt at Trondhjems mekaniske Værksted. She had her hull extended by 20 feet (6.1 m), making her a 991 gross register ton/556 net register ton ship. The Third Class section was moved amidships and expanded, and a refrigerated cargo room was added. The bridge was moved up one deck. Nordnorge was fitted with an echo sounder, an electric logbook and radio telephone.

Nordnorge departed Bergen on her first Hurtigruten voyage to Kirkenes on 3 November 1936. When she was introduced into the service, the build-up of the Hurtigruten was complete, with daily departures from all the ports of the route.

== Second World War ==
Following the outbreak of the Second World War in September 1939, Nordnorge continued to sail the coast of Norway. On 13 December 1939 she rescued a survivor from the British steamer Deptford, which had been torpedoed and sunk by the German U-boat U-38. The Norwegian patrol boat HNoMS Firda rescued a further four survivors from the sunken steamer's 36-man crew.

=== Invasion and mothballing ===
When Nazi Germany invaded Norway on 9 April 1940, initiating the 62-day Norwegian campaign, Nordnorge was in dry dock undergoing the final day of her annual maintenance work. During her maintenance period, one of the company's smaller steamers, Barøy, stood in for her on the Hurtigruten service. She was supposed to re-enter service on 10 April, an event which was postponed due to the German invasion. Instead Nordnorge was mothballed at Nyhavna in Trondheim.

=== Operation Wildente and loss ===
On 7 May 1940 the German occupiers of Trondheim confiscated Nordnorge and replaced her Norwegian crew with Kriegsmarine personnel from the destroyers Paul Jakobi and Theodor Riedel. Late in the evening of 9 May the ship sailed northwards from Nyhavna under Norwegian flag, carrying a 300-strong force consisting of a company of mostly Austrian Gebirgsjäger troops from the 138 Mountain Regiment of the 2nd Mountain Division, reinforced with a heavy mortar platoon and two mountain guns. The troops and their equipment had been loaded at Muruvik near Hell. In Operation Wildente, the Germans aimed at using the Norwegian coastal steamer to bring their own troops the 500 kilometres (310 mi) to Hemnesberget, well behind the Allied lines which were south of Mo i Rana. A successful operation would break up the Allied defence line in Nordland county and cut off Norwegian and British forces, leaving the way north open for the advancing Germans, which at that point were struggling to move forward in the Mosjøen area. The operation had originally been initiated on 8 May, but had been recalled after reports of Allied submarine activity in the area. While Hauptmann Anton Holzinger led the operation, Kapitanleutnant Ernst Vogelsang captained Nordnorge during the voyage north. The Germans had armed Nordnorge with two 20 mm automatic cannon and two machine guns, mounted respectively at the bridge and at the bow of the ship.

At 09:50 on 10 May, the Norwegian military in Mosjøen was alerted that Nordnorge was sailing north, escorted by two German aircraft. The report, from observers in Rørvik, was forwarded to the British military, who after some initial hesitation, at 11:55 ordered the cruiser HMS Calcutta and the destroyer HMS Zulu to intercept and sink Nordnorge. Delayed by German air raids on the Royal Navy base in Skjelfjord in Lofoten, the British warships only got under way at 15:00, too late to intercept Nordnorge. Nordnorge was spotted again at 12:00, by a Norwegian observation post as she passed Lyngvær. The post transmitted their sighting to the military communications central in Bodø. As it was uncertain where Nordnorge was headed, Norwegian militia and army units were alerted along the coast of Hålogaland.

Nordnorge arrived at Hemnesberget at 18:30 on 10 May 1940, after a 40-hour journey. Flying the German war flag only at the last minute, the German troops on board stormed the town. As Nordnorge approached the main quay in Hemnesberget, No. 3 Platoon of No. 1 Independent Company and some 120 Norwegian landvern troops (of Infantry Regiment 14) opened small arms fire at the ship from covered positions. After getting a hawser ashore, German soldiers attacked across the quay, engaging in close house-to-house fighting. During the fighting three German bombers attacked the town. After an hour of fighting the British and Norwegian troops pulled away from the area. Following the capture of Hemnesberget, Nordnorge was unloaded of ammunition and supplies, and Allied and German dead and wounded brought on board. As part of Operation Wildente, German troops were also landed by Dornier seaplanes at nearby Sund. The fighting in Hemnesberget cost the lives of five German and eight British soldiers, as well as two Norwegian civilians. In his contribution to the major work on Norway and the Second World War Norges Krig 1940–1945 in 1947, Norwegian Major General Ragnvald Roscher Nielsen called Operation Wildente "as audacious as the original invasion".

At 20:15, Calcutta and Zulu finally reached Hemnesberget. Nordnorge was immediately sunk by gunfire and two torpedoes. The ship exploded and sank stern first in deep water. As she went down, Nordnorge capsized and tore down the quay to which she was moored. The ammunition that had been unloaded on the quay was hit by gunfire and exploded. Sixteen houses were destroyed in the British shelling of Hemnesberget, and one Norwegian civilian was killed. Several of the wounded on board Nordnorge perished when she sank. As Calcutta and Zulu left the scene, they sank the small Norwegian steamer Ranheim. Before Nordnorge was sunk, the Germans had managed to unload the two mountain guns, while the other supplies lost in the sinking were replaced the next day by seaplanes.

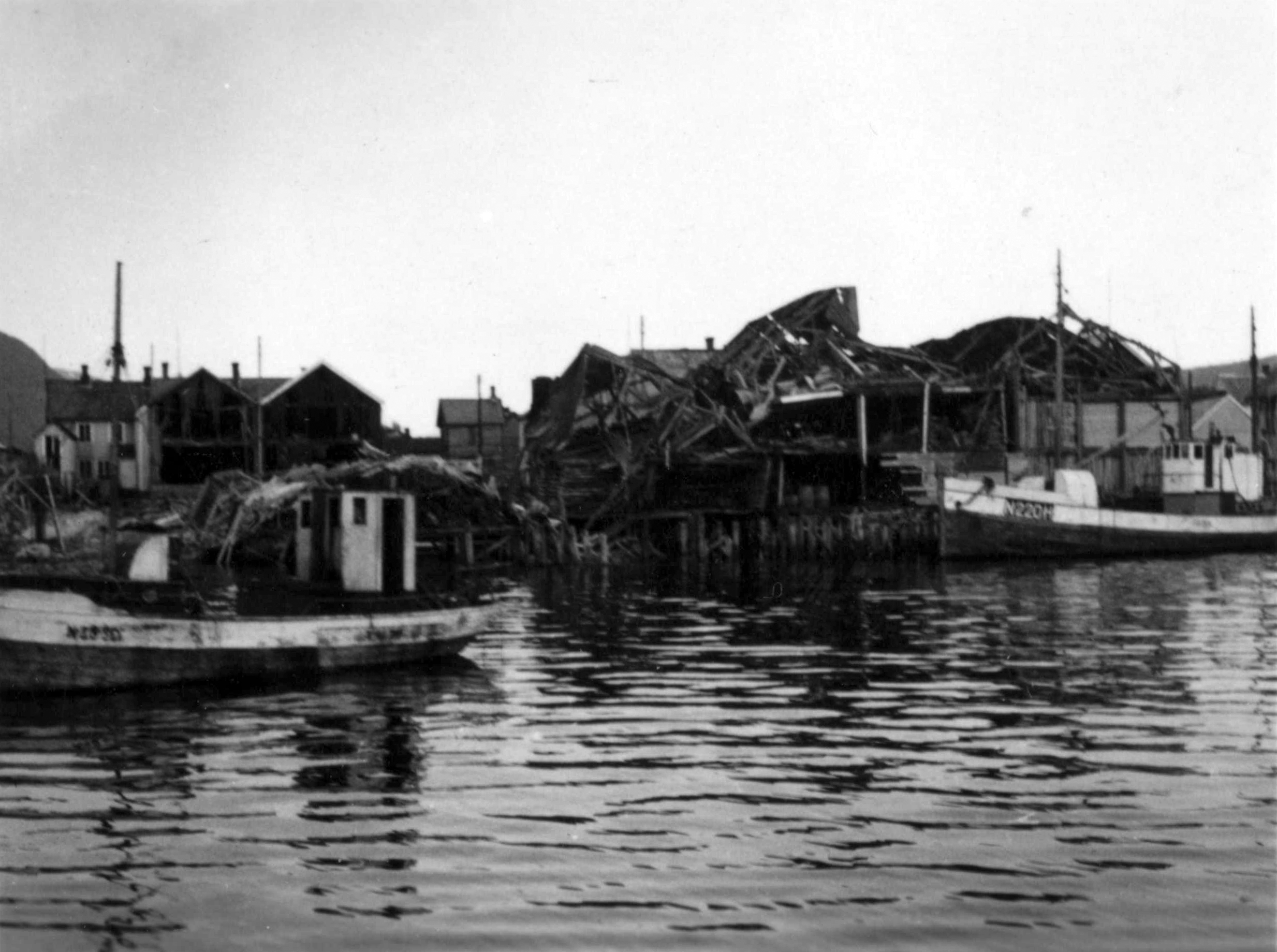
The dock area in Hemnesberget after the fighting in May 1940

The German capture of Hemnesberget was followed by an unsuccessful Norwegian counter-attack from nearby Finneid on 11 May. During the initial advance of the counter-attack the Norwegian forces captured three of the German naval personnel who had manned Nordnorge, before being pushed back. On 13 May the British and Norwegian forces in the area retreated northwards. The Germans continued their advance on 14 May, while two Royal Navy ships bombarded Hemnesberget the same day, destroying around 160 houses.

Following the success of Operation Wildente, the Germans made another attempt at bypassing the Allied front lines in Nordland. On 19 May the German-manned cargo ship Albion attempted to bring supplies to the German forces advancing in Nordland. When Albion was spotted by Norwegian lookouts early on in her voyage, she was intercepted and sunk by the Norwegian warships HNoMS Honningsvåg and HNoMS Heilhorn.

== Aftermath ==
Having suffered the loss of Nordnorge, Ofotens Dampskibsselskap continued to use Barøy on her route. (Note: Nordnorge was one of five Hurtigruten vessels lost during the 1940 Norwegian campaign, and the only one of the five to be sunk by Allied forces.) Barøy was herself torpedoed and sunk by a British aircraft on 13 September 1941. In total, Ofotens Dampskibsselskap lost four ships during the war years, three to air and naval attack and one in a grounding.
