= Bleikvatnet =

Lake in Hemnes, Norway

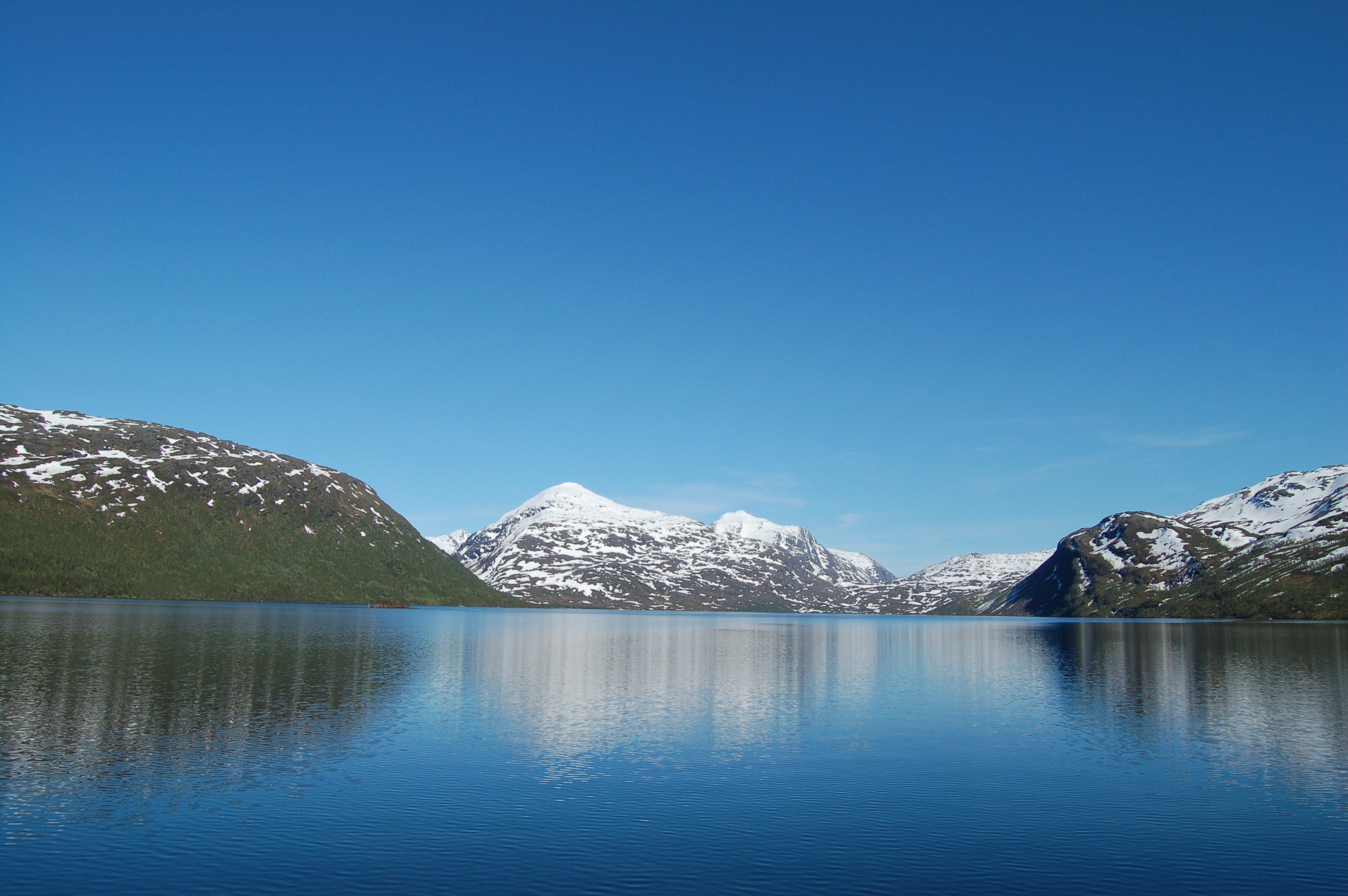
- Interactive map of the lake
- Location: Hemnes Municipality, Nordland
- Coordinates: 65.9420°N 13.9527°E
- Basin countries: Norway
- Max. length: 7.5 kilometres (4.7 mi)
- Max. width: 2 kilometres (1.2 mi)
- Surface area: 12.59 km^{2} (4.86 sq mi)
- Shore length^{1}: 35.31 kilometres (21.94 mi)
- Surface elevation: 405 metres (1,329 ft)
- References: NVE
- ^{1} Shore length is not a well-defined measure.

Bleikvatnet is a lake in Hemnes Municipality in Nordland county, Norway. The lake lies about 5 kilometres (3.1 mi) northeast of the village of Bleikvasslia. The 12.59-square-kilometre (4.86 sq mi) lake is regulated by a dam. The water flows out to the south and then down a 64-metre (210 ft) tall waterfall on the river Bleikvasselva.

== See also ==
- List of lakes in Norway
- Geography of Norway
