= Kjell-Idar Juvik =

Norwegian politician (born 1966)

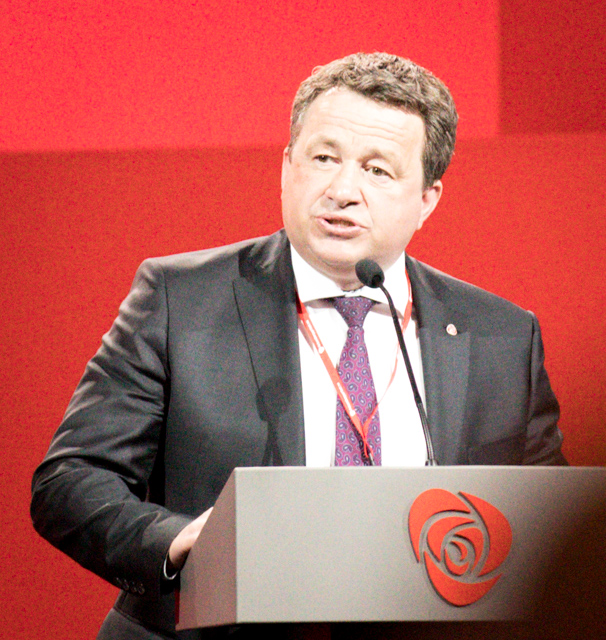
- Kjell-Idar Juvik in 2017

Mayor of Hemnes Municipality
- In office 2003–2011
- Preceded by: Per Jomar Hoel
- Succeeded by: Kjell Joar Petersen-Øverleir

Personal details
- Born: 21 May 1966 (age 59) Hemnesberget, Helgeland, Norway
- Party: Norwegian Labour Party

Kjell-Idar Juvik (born 21 May 1966) is a Norwegian politician for the Norwegian Labour Party.

Born in Hemnesberget, Helgeland, Kjell-Idar Juvik has been a member of the municipal council of Hemnes Municipality since 1987, and served as mayor from 2003–2011. Juvik gained national media attention as one of the four mayors that fronted his municipality and seven others in the Terra Securities scandal.

He is the nephew of former parliament member Sverre Johan Juvik.
