= Sverre Johan Juvik =

Norwegian politician

Sverre Johan Juvik (20 April 1922 – 26 May 2015) was a Norwegian politician for the Labour Party.

He was elected to the Norwegian Parliament from Sogn og Fjordane in 1969, and was re-elected on one occasion. On the local level he was a member of the municipal council of Årdal Municipality from 1951 to 1958. After a hiatus he returned to serve in the executive committee during the term 1979–1983.

Outside politics he was a laborer at local saw mills from 1939 to 1950, before starting a career at Årdal og Sunndal Verk.

He is the uncle of Kjell-Idar Juvik, the mayor of Hemnes Municipality.
