= Sund, Hemnes =

Village in Hemnes Municipality, Norway

Sund
- Village
- Interactive map of Sund
- Location within Nordland Location within Norway
- Coordinates: 66.2073°N 13.6443°E
- Country: Norway
- Region: Northern Norway
- County: Nordland
- District: Helgeland
- Municipality: Hemnes Municipality
- Elevation: 9 m (30 ft)
- Time zone: UTC+01:00 (CET)
  - Summer (DST): UTC+02:00 (CEST)
- Post Code: 8640 Hemnesberget

Sund is a village in Hemnes Municipality in Nordland county, Norway. It is located just south of the village of Hemnesberget on the Hemnes peninsula.
