= Korgen Municipality =

Former municipality in Nordland, Norway

Korgen Municipality Korgen herred
- Former municipality
- Nordland within Norway

- Korgen within Nordland
- Coordinates: 66.0766°N 13.8216°E
- Country: Norway
- County: Nordland
- District: Helgeland
- Established: 1 July 1918
  - Preceded by: Hemnes Municipality
- Disestablished: 1 Jan 1964
  - Succeeded by: Hemnes Municipality
- Administrative centre: Korgen

Government
  - Mayor (1955–1963): Ole Brygfjeld (Ap)

Area (upon dissolution)
  - Total: 625.5 km^{2} (241.5 sq mi)
  - Rank: #161 in Norway
- Highest elevation: 1,915.75 m (6,285.3 ft)

Population (1963)
  - Total: 3,105
  - Rank: #294 in Norway
  - Density: 5/km^{2} (13/sq mi)
  - Change (10 years): ▲ +9.7%
- Demonym: Korgen-folk

Official language
  - Norwegian form: Bokmål
- Time zone: UTC+01:00 (CET)
  - Summer (DST): UTC+02:00 (CEST)
- ISO 3166 code: NO-1830

Korgen is a former municipality in Nordland county, Norway. The 625.5-square-kilometre (241.5 sq mi) municipality existed from 1918 until its dissolution in 1964. The municipality included the central part of what is now Hemnes Municipality, centered around the river Røssåga. It was located in the traditional district of Helgeland. The administrative centre was the village of Korgen where Korgen Church is located.

Prior to its dissolution in 1964, the 625.5-square-kilometre (241.5 sq mi) municipality was the 161st largest by area out of the 689 municipalities in Norway. Korgen Municipality was the 294th most populous municipality in Norway with a population of about 3,105. The municipality's population density was 5 inhabitants per square kilometre (13/sq mi) and its population had increased by 9.7% over the previous 10-year period.

== General information ==
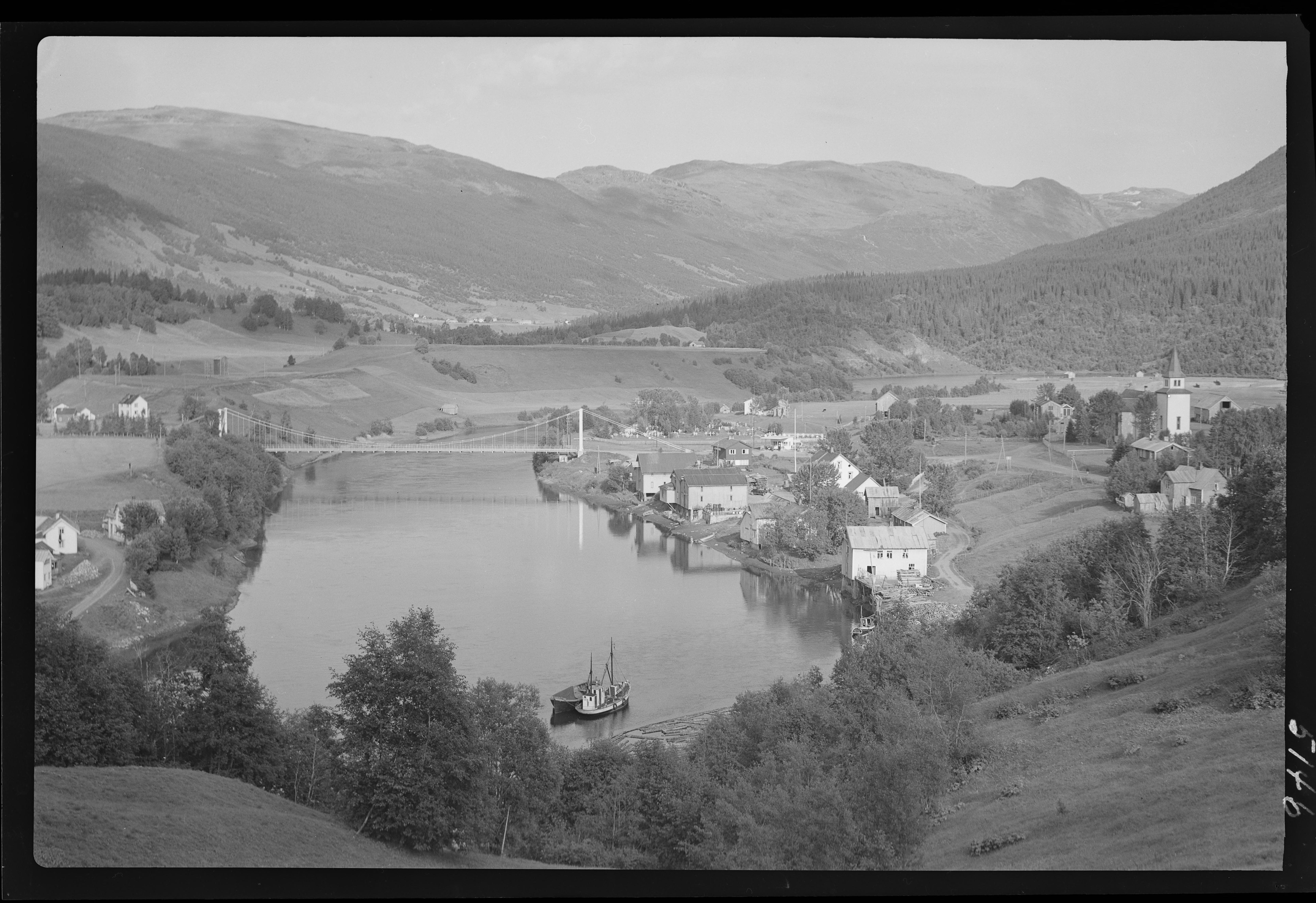
View of the village of Korgen (c. 1948)

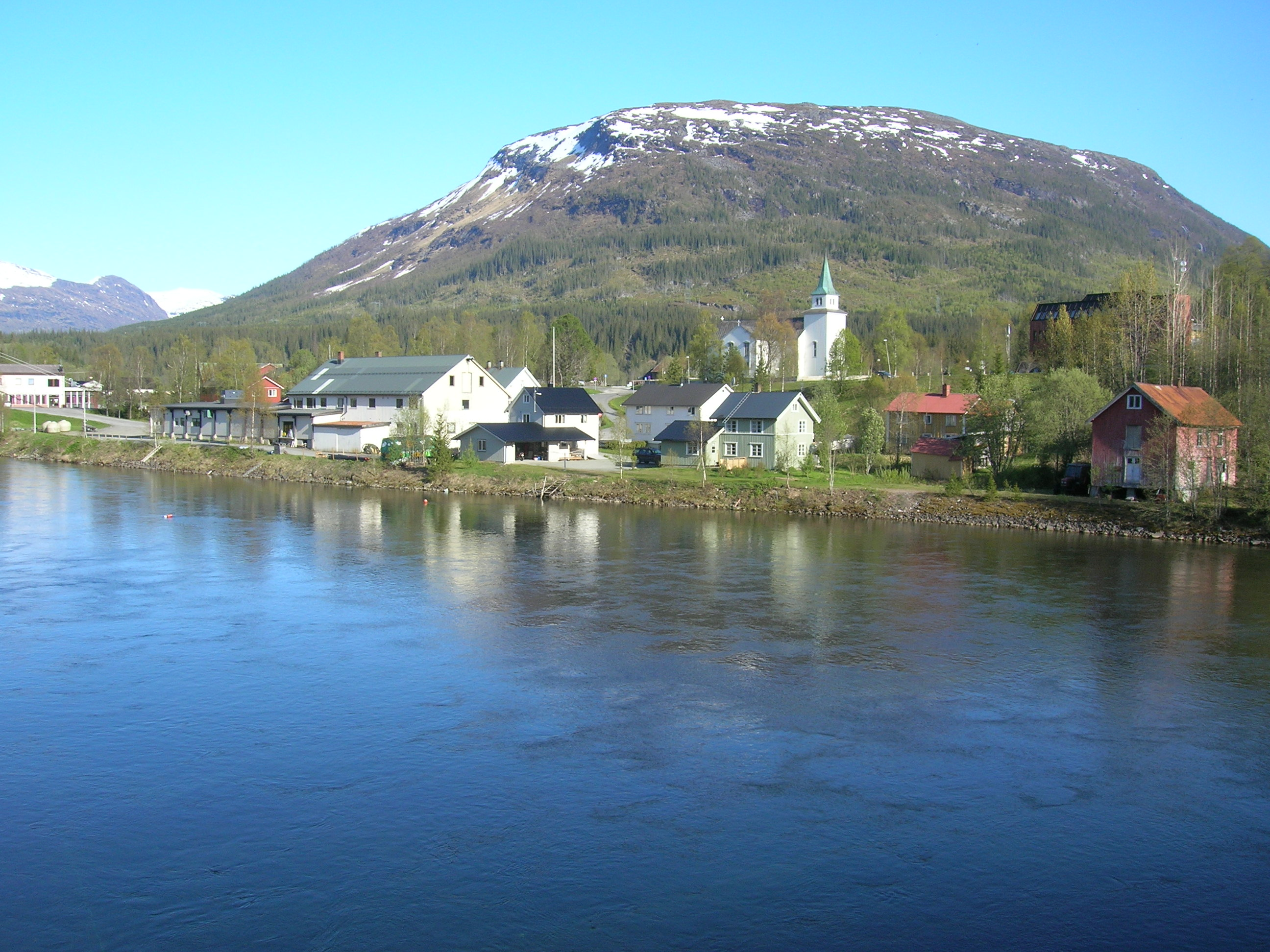
View of the river Røssåga at Korgen

The municipality of Korgen was established on 1 July 1918 when it was separated from the large Hemnes Municipality. Initially, the municipality had 1,369 residents. During the 1960s, there were many municipal mergers across Norway due to the work of the Schei Committee. On 1 January 1964, Korgen Municipality (population: 3,033) was merged with Hemnes Municipality (population: 1,352), the southern district of Sør-Rana Municipality (population: 934), and the far northern part of Hattfjelldal Municipality (population: 168) to create a new, larger Hemnes Municipality.

=== Name ===
The municipality (originally the parish) is named after the old Korgen farm since the first Korgen Church was built there. The name is probably derived from the word korga which means "extension". This is likely referring to the location of the farm, on a long, wide peninsula surrounded on three sides by the river Røssåga.

=== Churches ===
The Church of Norway had one parish (sokn) within Korgen Municipality. At the time of the municipal dissolution, it was part of the Hemnes prestegjeld and the Indre Helgeland prosti (deanery) in the Diocese of Sør-Hålogaland.

Churches in Korgen Municipality
Parish (sokn)	Church name	Location of the church	Year built
Korgen	Korgen Church	Korgen	1863

== Geography ==
The highest point in the municipality was the 1,915.75-metre (6,285.3 ft) tall mountain Oksskolten, on the border with Sør-Rana Municipality.

== Government ==
While it existed, Korgen Municipality was responsible for primary education (through 10th grade), outpatient health services, senior citizen services, welfare and other social services, zoning, economic development, and municipal roads and utilities. The municipality was governed by a municipal council of directly elected representatives. The mayor was indirectly elected by a vote of the municipal council. The municipality was under the jurisdiction of the Hålogaland Court of Appeal.

=== Municipal council ===
The municipal council (Herredsstyre) of Korgen Municipality was made up of 17 representatives that were elected to four-year terms. The tables below show the historical composition of the council by political party.

Korgen herredsstyre 1959–1963
Party name (in Norwegian)	Number of representatives
Labour Party (Arbeiderpartiet)	9
Communist Party (Kommunistiske Parti)	1
Christian Democratic Party (Kristelig Folkeparti)	2
Centre Party (Senterpartiet)	3
Liberal Party (Venstre)	2
Total number of members:	17
Note: On 1 January 1964, Korgen Municipality became part of Hemnes Municipality.

Korgen herredsstyre 1955–1959
Party name (in Norwegian)	Number of representatives
Labour Party (Arbeiderpartiet)	10
Communist Party (Kommunistiske Parti)	1
Joint List(s) of Non-Socialist Parties (Borgerlige Felleslister)	6
Total number of members:	17

Korgen herredsstyre 1951–1955
Party name (in Norwegian)	Number of representatives
Labour Party (Arbeiderpartiet)	5
Communist Party (Kommunistiske Parti)	1
Joint List(s) of Non-Socialist Parties (Borgerlige Felleslister)	6
Total number of members:	12

Korgen herredsstyre 1947–1951
Party name (in Norwegian)	Number of representatives
Labour Party (Arbeiderpartiet)	1
List of workers, fishermen, and small farmholders (Arbeidere, fiskere, småbrukere liste)	4
Joint List(s) of Non-Socialist Parties (Borgerlige Felleslister)	7
Total number of members:	12

Korgen herredsstyre 1945–1947
Party name (in Norwegian)	Number of representatives
List of workers, fishermen, and small farmholders (Arbeidere, fiskere, småbrukere liste)	6
Joint List(s) of Non-Socialist Parties (Borgerlige Felleslister)	5
Local List(s) (Lokale lister)	1
Total number of members:	12

Korgen herredsstyre 1937–1941*
Party name (in Norwegian)	Number of representatives
Labour Party (Arbeiderpartiet)	3
Farmers' Party (Bondepartiet)	5
Liberal Party (Venstre)	2
Joint List(s) of Non-Socialist Parties (Borgerlige Felleslister)	2
Total number of members:	12
Note: Due to the German occupation of Norway during World War II, no elections were held for new municipal councils until after the war ended in 1945.

=== Mayors ===
The mayor (Norwegian: ordfører) of Korgen Municipality was the political leader of the municipality and the chairperson of the municipal council. Here is a list of people who held this position:

- 1918–1919: Johan Petersen Øverleir
- 1919–1925: Martin Jenssen Lillebjerka
- 1925–1931: Ludvig Jakobsen Oldernes
- 1932–1935: Jens Bech Skogan (Bp)
- 1935–1942: Svend Kibsgaard
- 1943–1944: Nils Olaus Rydså (NS)
- 1945–1945: Svend Kibsgaard
- 1946–1955: Ivar Hellbekkmo
- 1955–1963: Ole Brygfjeld (Ap)

== See also ==
- List of former municipalities of Norway
