= Bjerka =

Village in Hemnes Municipality, Norway

- Village
- Interactive map of Bjerka
- Location within Nordland Location within Norway
- Coordinates: 66.1491°N 13.8362°E
- Country: Norway
- Region: Northern Norway
- County: Nordland
- District: Helgeland
- Municipality: Hemnes Municipality

Area
  - Total: 0.7 km^{2} (0.27 sq mi)
- Elevation: 6 m (20 ft)

Population (2024)
  - Total: 476
  - Density: 680/km^{2} (1,800/sq mi)
- Time zone: UTC+01:00 (CET)
  - Summer (DST): UTC+02:00 (CEST)
- Post Code: 8643 Bjerka

Bjerka is a village in Hemnes Municipality in Nordland county, Norway. It is located along the European route E6 highway and the Nordland Line, about 20 kilometres (12 mi) southeast of Hemnesberget and about 7 kilometres (4.3 mi) north of the municipal center of Korgen.

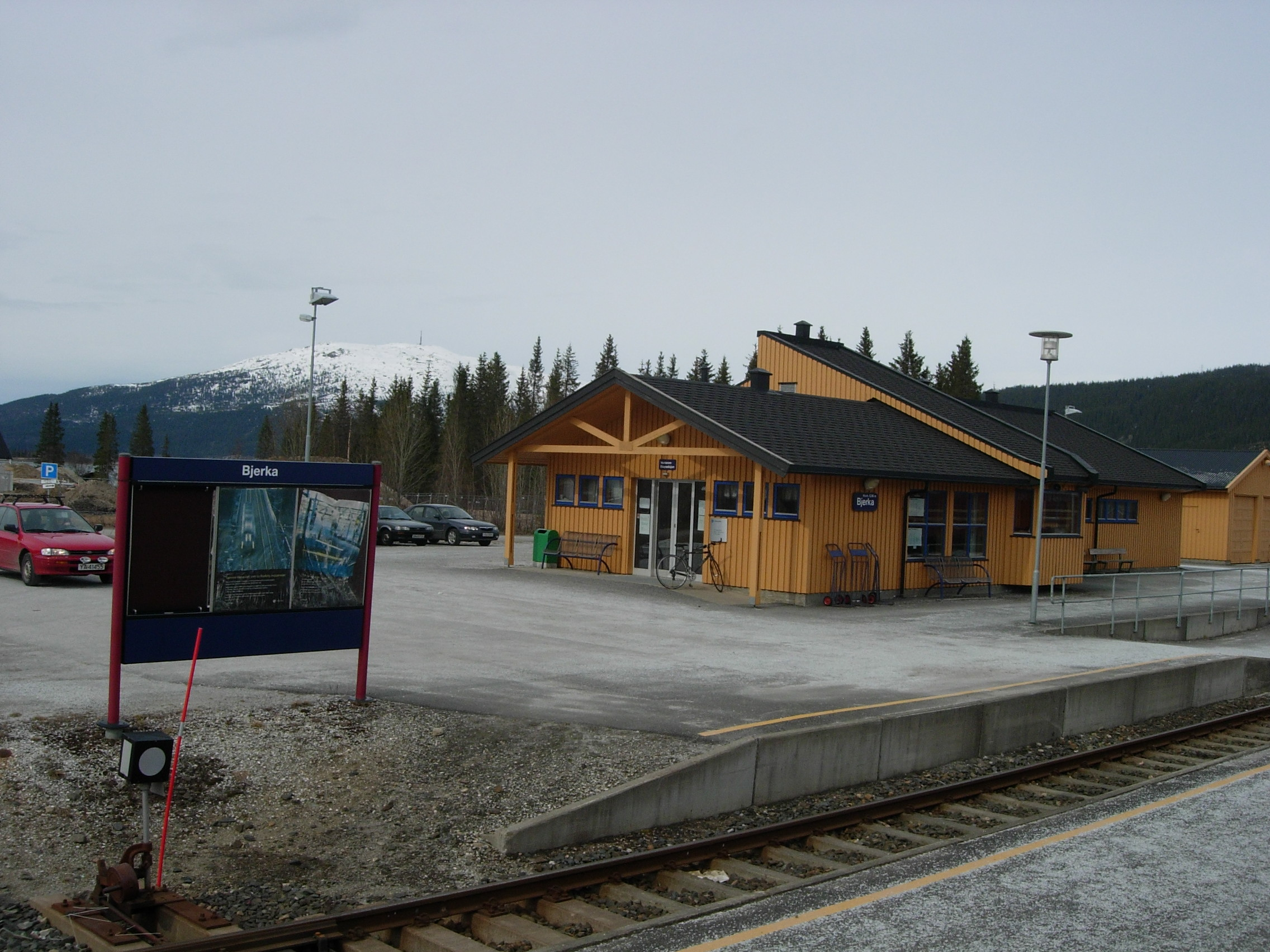
Train station in Bjerka

The 0.7-square-kilometre (170-acre) village has a population (2024) of 476 and a population density of 680 inhabitants per square kilometre (1,800/sq mi).
