= Bleikvasslia =

Village in Hemnes Municipality, Norway

- Village
- Interactive map of Bleikvasslia
- Location within Nordland Location within Norway
- Coordinates: 65.9086°N 13.8072°E
- Country: Norway
- Region: Northern Norway
- County: Nordland
- District: Helgeland
- Municipality: Hemnes Municipality
- Elevation: 314 m (1,030 ft)
- Time zone: UTC+01:00 (CET)
  - Summer (DST): UTC+02:00 (CEST)
- Post Code: 8647 Bleikvasslia

Bleikvasslia is a village in Hemnes Municipality in Nordland county, Norway. The village is located about 20 kilometres (12 mi) south of the village of Korgen, just southwest of the lake Bleikvatnet.

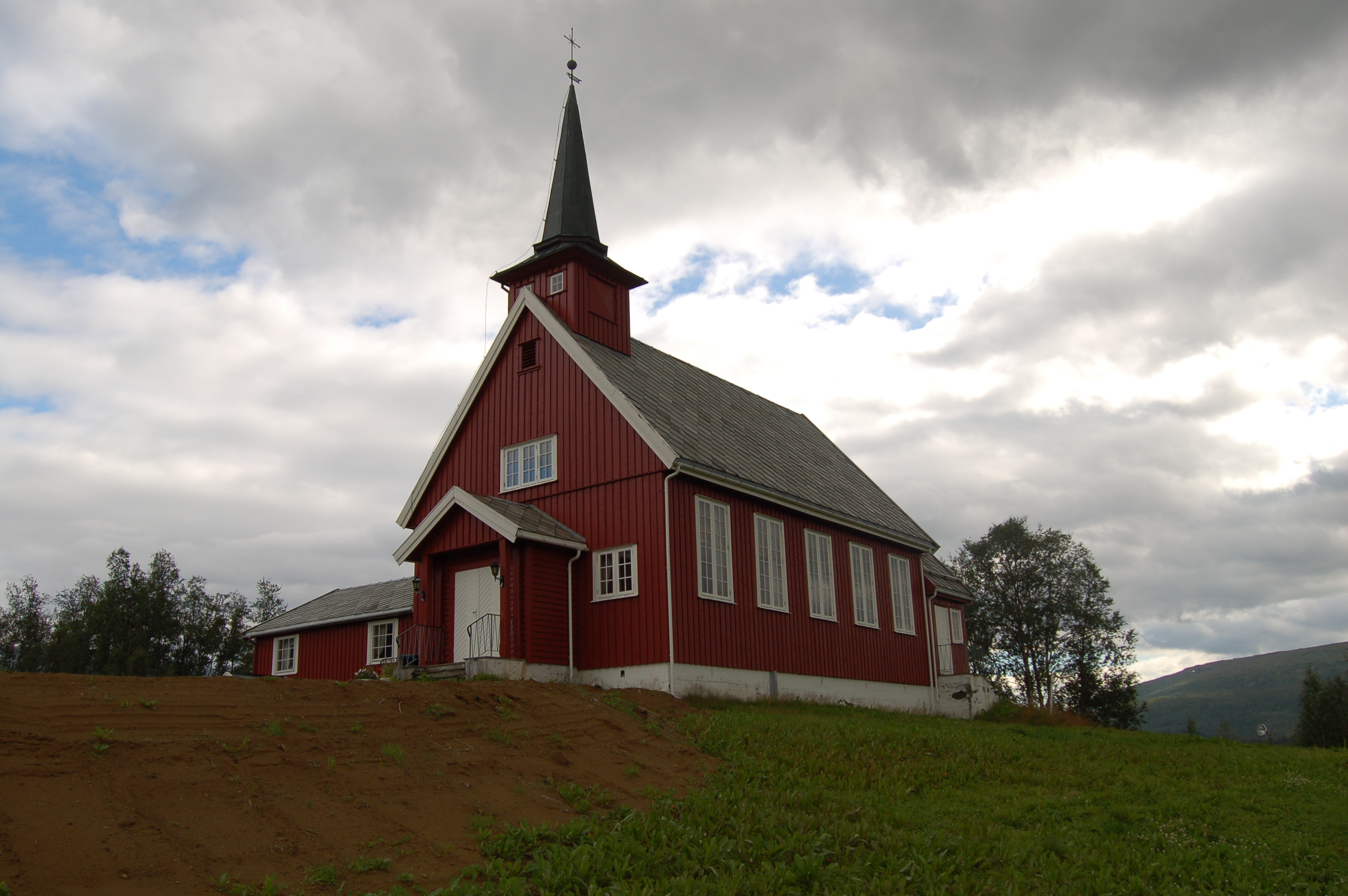
View of Bleikvassli Church

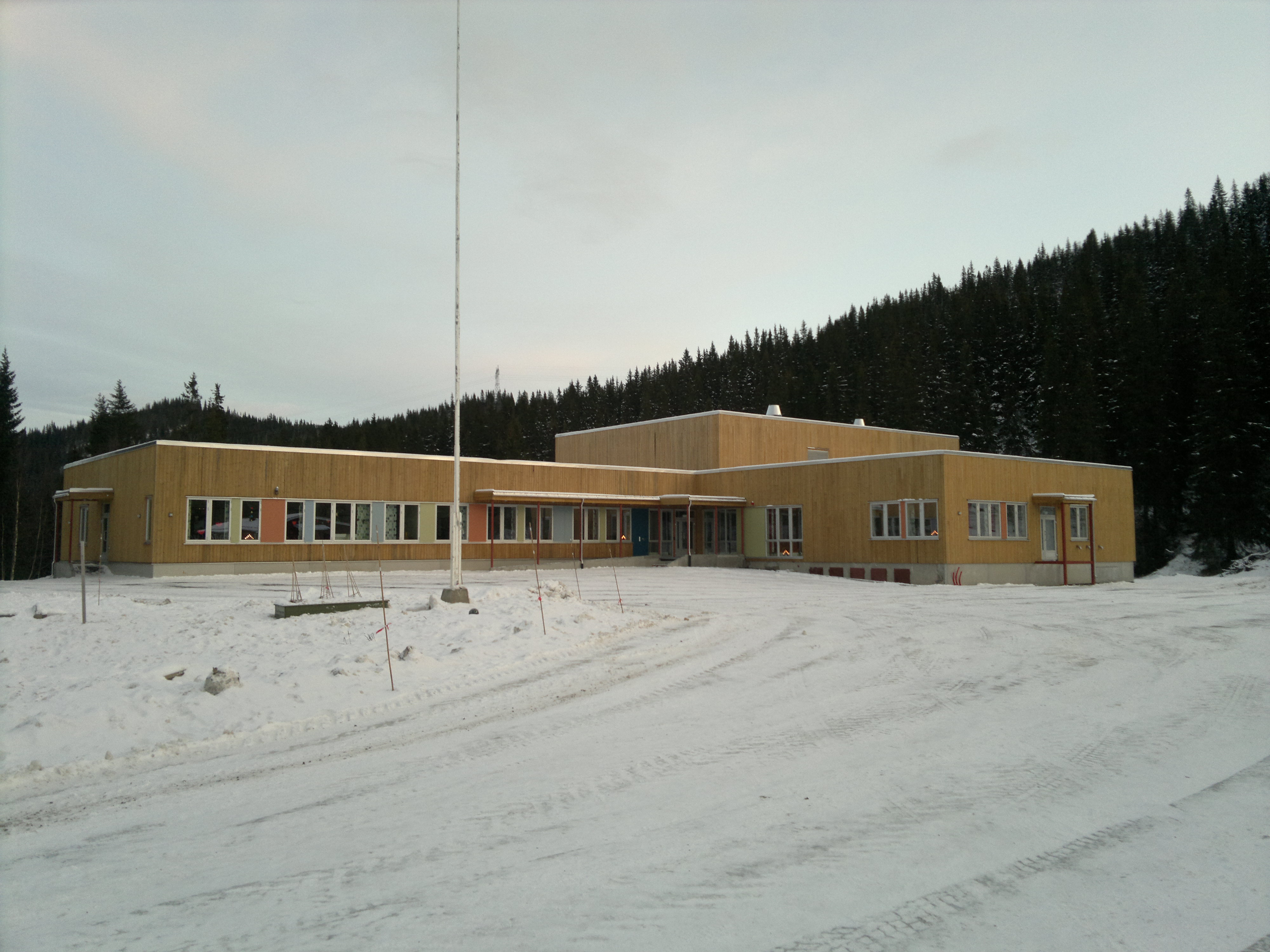
View of the local school

Bleikvasslia is a former mining community, but water started leaking into the mines therefore they no longer produce. Bleikvassli Church is located in this village. There is one gas station and store in the village. There are two dams nearby that produce hydroelectric power.

There are many cabins scattered around the Bleikvasslia area that people from Korgen use as vacation homes. The 218-square-kilometre (84 sq mi) lake Røsvatnet lies just south of the village along the municipal border.
