= Hemnes Municipality =

Municipality in Nordland, Norway

Hemnes Municipality Hemnes kommune Heäjmmanássja (Ume Sami)
- Municipality
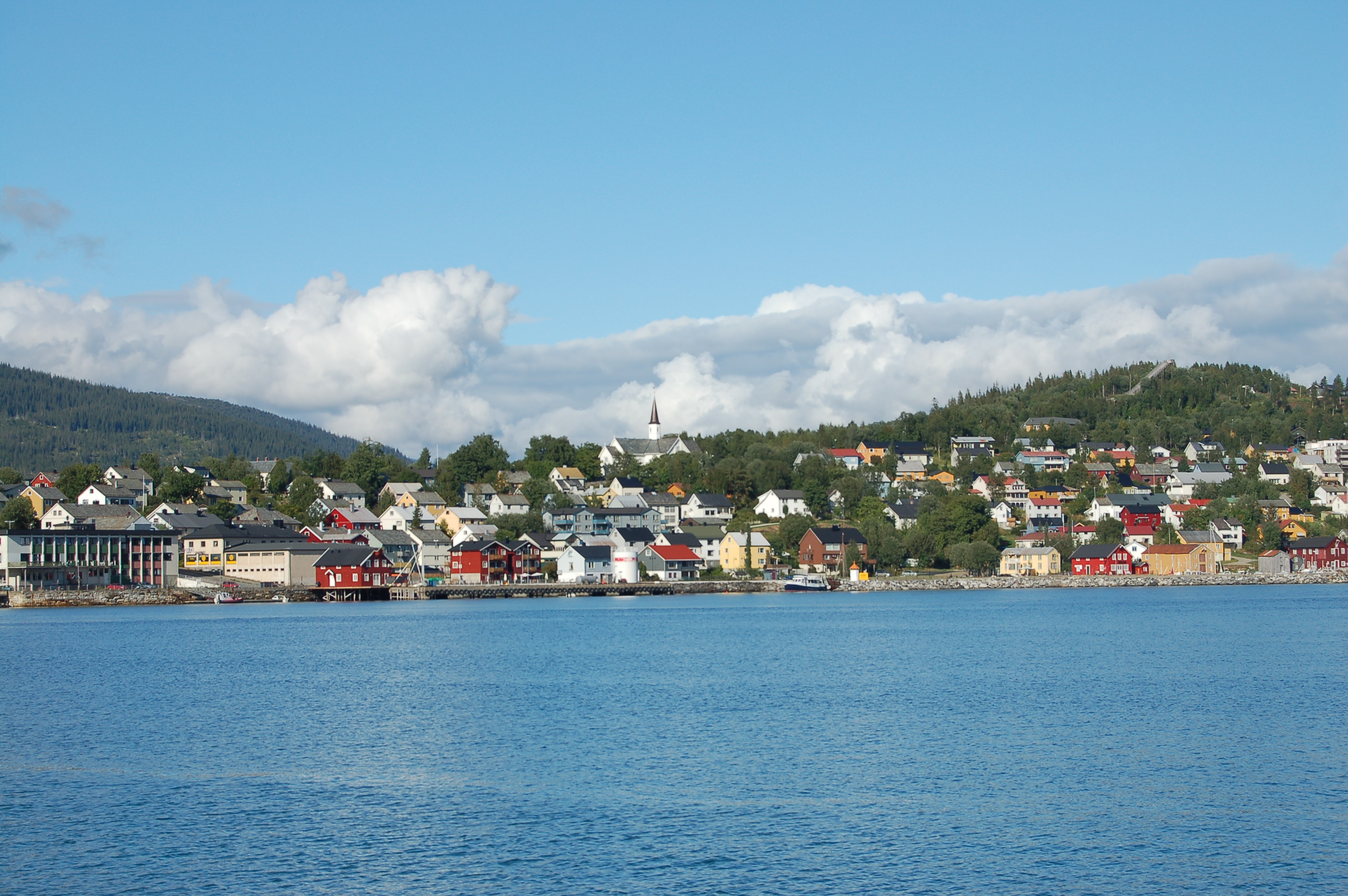
- View of Hemnesberget

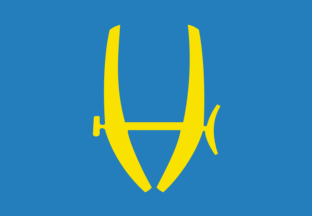
- Flag Coat of arms

- Nordland within Norway

- Hemnes within Nordland
- Coordinates: 66°03′15″N 14°01′50″E
- Country: Norway
- County: Nordland
- District: Helgeland
- Established: 1839
  - Preceded by: Rana Municipality
- Administrative centre: Korgen

Government
  - Mayor (2019): Paul Asphaug (Sp)

Area
  - Total: 1,589.50 km^{2} (613.71 sq mi)
  - Land: 1,429.98 km^{2} (552.12 sq mi)
  - Water: 159.52 km^{2} (61.59 sq mi) 10%
  - Rank: #49 in Norway
- Highest elevation: 1,915.75 m (6,285.3 ft)

Population (2024)
  - Total: 4,485
  - Rank: #194 in Norway
  - Density: 2.8/km^{2} (7.3/sq mi)
  - Change (10 years): ▼ −1.5%
- Demonym: Hemnesværing

Official language
  - Norwegian form: Neutral
- Time zone: UTC+01:00 (CET)
  - Summer (DST): UTC+02:00 (CEST)
- ISO 3166 code: NO-1832
- Website: Official website

Hemnes (Ume Sámi: Heäjmmanássja) is a municipality in Nordland county, Norway. It is part of the Helgeland traditional region. The administrative centre of the municipality is the village of Korgen. Other villages include Bjerka, Bleikvasslia, Finneidfjord, Hemnesberget, and Sund.

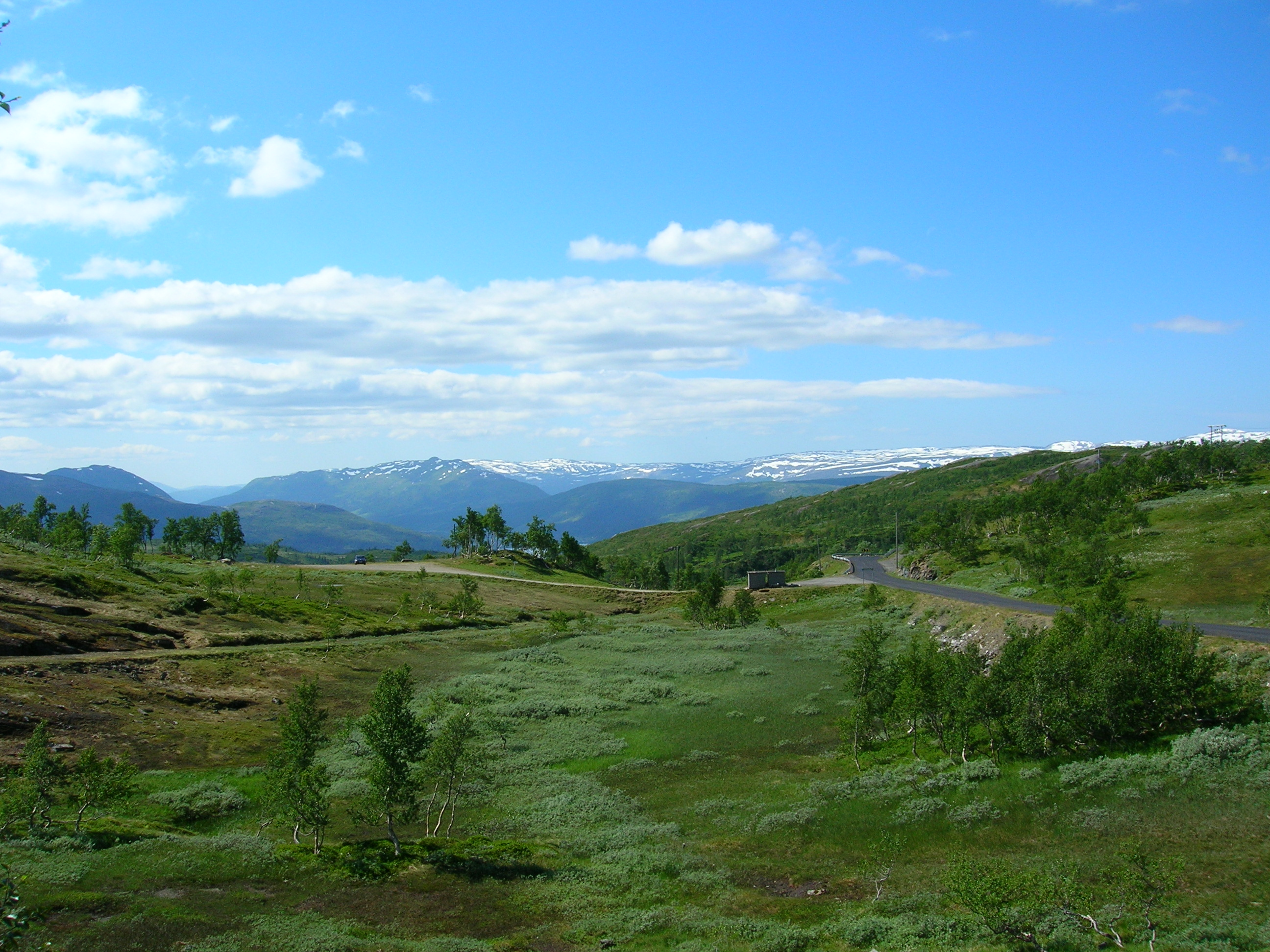
View from Korgfjellet mountain in Hemnes (about 400 m amsl) towards Vefsn

The municipality sits south of the Ranfjorden and stretches south and east toward the border with Sweden. The Nordland Line and European route E6 cross Hemnes on their way to the town of Mo i Rana about 20 kilometres (12 mi) to the northeast. The E6 highway enters Hemnes from the west through the Korgfjell Tunnel from Vefsn Municipality.

The 1,590-square-kilometre (610 sq mi) municipality is the 49th largest by area out of the 357 municipalities in Norway. Hemnes Municipality is the 194th most populous municipality in Norway with a population of 4,485. The municipality's population density is 2.8 inhabitants per square kilometre (7.3/sq mi) and its population has decreased by 1.5% over the previous 10-year period.

== General information ==
This municipality was established in 1839 when the large Rana Municipality was divided into Sør-Rana Municipality and Nord-Rana Municipality, shortly after the Formannskapsdistrikt law went into effect. Soon after, in 1844, Sør-Rana Municipality was renamed Hemnes Municipality.

On 1 July 1918, the southern district of Hemnes Municipality (population: 1,369) was separated to become the new Korgen Municipality. This left Hemnes Municipality with 3,567 residents. A few months later on 1 January 1919, the eastern area of Bardal (population: 4) was transferred to the neighboring Nesna Municipality. Then on 1 July 1929, Hemnes was divided into three smaller municipalities: Sør-Rana Municipality, Elsfjord Municipality, and Hemnes Municipality. After this division, Hemnes Municipality only consisted of the large village of Hemnesberget and the area immediately around it (population: 1,077).

During the 1960s, there were many municipal mergers across Norway due to the work of the Schei Committee. On 1 January 1964, Hemnes Municipality (population: 1,352) was merged with Korgen Municipality (population: 3,033), the extreme northern part of Hattfjelldal Municipality (population: 168), and the southern part of Sør-Rana Municipality (population: 934) to form a new, larger Hemnes Municipality.

=== Name ===
The municipality (originally the parish) is named after the old Hemnes farm (Old Norse: Heimnes, now called Hemnesberget) since the first Hemnes Church was built there. The first element is heimr which means "home" (here in the sense of being "closest to home"). The last element is nes which means "headland", referring to the peninsula on which the farm is located.

=== Coat of arms ===
The coat of arms was granted on 4 April 1986. The official blazon is "Azure, boat clamps Or" (Norwegian: I blått en gull båtklammer). This means the arms have a blue field (background) and the charge is a boat clamp. The clamp has a tincture of Or which means it is commonly colored yellow, but if it is made out of metal, then gold is used. The blue color in the field symbolizes the importance of the ocean. The clamp was chosen because shipbuilding has long been a tradition in the municipality. To symbolize shipbuilding, it was decided to use the clamp which is used to keep the wooden flanks of the ships together. The arms were designed by Anne Lofthus Valla.

=== Churches ===
The Church of Norway has three parishes (sokn) within Hemnes Municipality. It is part of the Indre Helgeland prosti (deanery) in the Diocese of Sør-Hålogaland.

Churches in Hemnes Municipality
Parish (sokn)	Church name	Location of the church	Year built
Bleikvassli	Bleikvassli Church	Bleikvasslia	1955
Hemnes	Hemnes Church	Hemnesberget	1872
Korgen	Korgen Church	Korgen	1863

== History ==
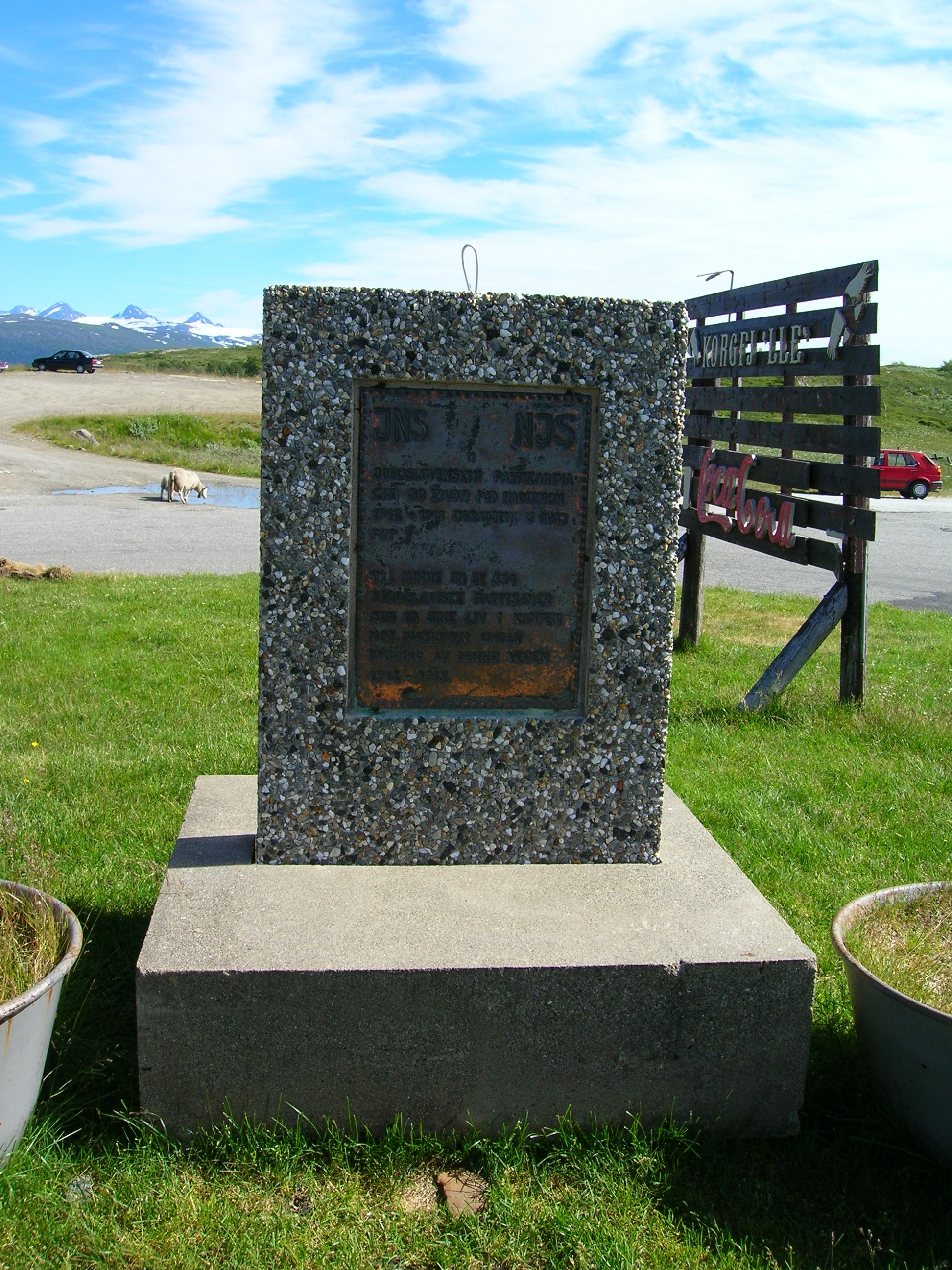
Memorial for Yugoslav partisans taken as POWs.

=== Second World War ===
As part of their drive on Northern Norway, a detachment of three hundred German soldiers landed at Hemnes from the captured Norwegian coastal steamer SS Nordnorge on 10 May 1940 and captured the municipality from a platoon of British soldiers from No. 1 Independent Company, despite a spirited defence in the streets of Hemnesberget. A Royal Navy task force consisting of the anti-aircraft cruiser Calcutta and destroyer Zulu sank the former Norwegian steamer and shelled the German forces in the town, but were unable to dislodge the German landing force.

A Norwegian Army detachment attempted a counterattack against the German's positions, but was driven back. The town was again bombarded on 12 May by a passing Royal Navy force without significant effect, leaving Hemnes in German control for the rest of the war.

== Economy ==
In 2023, a window manufacturing company, Natre Vinduer, announced that after 99 years operating in Hemnesberget, it was closing its factory and relocating it to Gjøvik. This would transfer about 100 employees out of the municipality to the new factory.

== Government ==
Hemnes Municipality is responsible for primary education (through 10th grade), outpatient health services, senior citizen services, welfare and other social services, zoning, economic development, and municipal roads and utilities. The municipality is governed by a municipal council of directly elected representatives. The mayor is indirectly elected by a vote of the municipal council. The municipality is under the jurisdiction of the Helgeland District Court and the Hålogaland Court of Appeal.

=== Municipal council ===
The municipal council (Kommunestyre) of Hemnes Municipality is made up of 23 representatives that are elected to four year terms. The tables below show the current and historical composition of the council by political party.

Hemnes kommunestyre 2023–2027
Party name (in Norwegian)	Number of representatives
Labour Party (Arbeiderpartiet)	5
Progress Party (Fremskrittspartiet)	2
Conservative Party (Høyre)	3
Centre Party (Senterpartiet)	4
Socialist Left Party (Sosialistisk Venstreparti)	3
Social Democrats Hemnes (Sosialdemokratene Hemnes)	5
Green Hemnes (Grønt Hemnes)	1
Total number of members:	23

Hemnes kommunestyre 2019–2023
Party name (in Norwegian)	Number of representatives
Labour Party (Arbeiderpartiet)	6
Progress Party (Fremskrittspartiet)	1
Conservative Party (Høyre)	4
Red Party (Rødt)	1
Centre Party (Senterpartiet)	6
Socialist Left Party (Sosialistisk Venstreparti)	2
Social Democrats Hemnes (Sosialdemokratene Hemnes)	3
Total number of members:	23

Hemnes kommunestyre 2015–2019
Party name (in Norwegian)	Number of representatives
Labour Party (Arbeiderpartiet)	8
Progress Party (Fremskrittspartiet)	2
Green Party (Miljøpartiet De Grønne)	1
Conservative Party (Høyre)	6
Centre Party (Senterpartiet)	4
Socialist Left Party (Sosialistisk Venstreparti)	2
Total number of members:	23

Hemnes kommunestyre 2011–2015
Party name (in Norwegian)	Number of representatives
Labour Party (Arbeiderpartiet)	8
Progress Party (Fremskrittspartiet)	4
Conservative Party (Høyre)	5
Centre Party (Senterpartiet)	4
Socialist Left Party (Sosialistisk Venstreparti)	1
Hemnes Community Party (Hemnes samfunnsparti)	1
Total number of members:	23

Hemnes kommunestyre 2007–2011
Party name (in Norwegian)	Number of representatives
Labour Party (Arbeiderpartiet)	11
Progress Party (Fremskrittspartiet)	5
Conservative Party (Høyre)	1
Centre Party (Senterpartiet)	4
Socialist Left Party (Sosialistisk Venstreparti)	1
Liberal Party (Venstre)	1
Total number of members:	23

Hemnes kommunestyre 2003–2007
Party name (in Norwegian)	Number of representatives
Labour Party (Arbeiderpartiet)	7
Progress Party (Fremskrittspartiet)	4
Conservative Party (Høyre)	2
Centre Party (Senterpartiet)	5
Socialist Left Party (Sosialistisk Venstreparti)	3
Liberal Party (Venstre)	1
Hemnes Peoples Party Free Politics List (Hemnes Folkepartis Fripolitiske Liste)	1
Total number of members:	23

Hemnes kommunestyre 1999–2003
Party name (in Norwegian)	Number of representatives
Labour Party (Arbeiderpartiet)	11
Progress Party (Fremskrittspartiet)	2
Conservative Party (Høyre)	2
Christian Democratic Party (Kristelig Folkeparti)	1
Centre Party (Senterpartiet)	10
Socialist Left Party (Sosialistisk Venstreparti)	2
Local list (Bygdelista)	1
Total number of members:	29

Hemnes kommunestyre 1995–1999
Party name (in Norwegian)	Number of representatives
Labour Party (Arbeiderpartiet)	13
Conservative Party (Høyre)	4
Christian Democratic Party (Kristelig Folkeparti)	1
Centre Party (Senterpartiet)	6
Socialist Left Party (Sosialistisk Venstreparti)	3
Local list (Bygdeliste)	2
Total number of members:	29

Hemnes kommunestyre 1991–1995
Party name (in Norwegian)	Number of representatives
Labour Party (Arbeiderpartiet)	12
Conservative Party (Høyre)	3
Christian Democratic Party (Kristelig Folkeparti)	1
Centre Party (Senterpartiet)	5
Socialist Left Party (Sosialistisk Venstreparti)	5
Local list (Bygdeliste)	3
Total number of members:	29

Hemnes kommunestyre 1987–1991
Party name (in Norwegian)	Number of representatives
Labour Party (Arbeiderpartiet)	13
Conservative Party (Høyre)	6
Christian Democratic Party (Kristelig Folkeparti)	1
Centre Party (Senterpartiet)	3
Socialist Left Party (Sosialistisk Venstreparti)	4
Liberal Party (Venstre)	1
Hemnes cross-party list (Hemnes tverrpolitiske liste)	1
Total number of members:	29

Hemnes kommunestyre 1983–1987
Party name (in Norwegian)	Number of representatives
Labour Party (Arbeiderpartiet)	15
Conservative Party (Høyre)	6
Christian Democratic Party (Kristelig Folkeparti)	1
Centre Party (Senterpartiet)	4
Socialist Left Party (Sosialistisk Venstreparti)	3
Joint list of the Liberal Party and independent liberal voters (Venstre og uavhengige liberale velgeres liste)	1
Total number of members:	31

Hemnes kommunestyre 1979–1983
Party name (in Norwegian)	Number of representatives
Labour Party (Arbeiderpartiet)	14
Conservative Party (Høyre)	8
Christian Democratic Party (Kristelig Folkeparti)	2
Centre Party (Senterpartiet)	4
Socialist Left Party (Sosialistisk Venstreparti)	1
Joint list of the Liberal Party and independent liberal voters (Venstre og uavhengige liberale velgeres liste)	2
Total number of members:	31

Hemnes kommunestyre 1975–1979
Party name (in Norwegian)	Number of representatives
Labour Party (Arbeiderpartiet)	15
Conservative Party (Høyre)	3
Christian Democratic Party (Kristelig Folkeparti)	2
Centre Party (Senterpartiet)	6
Socialist Left Party (Sosialistisk Venstreparti)	3
Joint list of the Liberal Party (Venstre) and New People's Party (Nye Folkepartiet)	2
Total number of members:	31

Hemnes kommunestyre 1971–1975
Party name (in Norwegian)	Number of representatives
Labour Party (Arbeiderpartiet)	15
Conservative Party (Høyre)	2
Christian Democratic Party (Kristelig Folkeparti)	1
Centre Party (Senterpartiet)	6
Socialist People's Party (Sosialistisk Folkeparti)	4
Liberal Party (Venstre)	3
Total number of members:	31

Hemnes kommunestyre 1967–1971
Party name (in Norwegian)	Number of representatives
Labour Party (Arbeiderpartiet)	16
Conservative Party (Høyre)	2
Communist Party (Kommunistiske Parti)	1
Centre Party (Senterpartiet)	5
Socialist People's Party (Sosialistisk Folkeparti)	3
Liberal Party (Venstre)	4
Total number of members:	31

Hemnes kommunestyre 1963–1967
Party name (in Norwegian)	Number of representatives
Labour Party (Arbeiderpartiet)	15
Conservative Party (Høyre)	3
Christian Democratic Party (Kristelig Folkeparti)	2
Centre Party (Senterpartiet)	5
Socialist People's Party (Sosialistisk Folkeparti)	3
Liberal Party (Venstre)	3
Total number of members:	31
Note: On 1 January 1964, Korgen Municipality and some other adjacent areas became part of Hemnes Municipality.

Hemnes herredsstyre 1959–1963
Party name (in Norwegian)	Number of representatives
Labour Party (Arbeiderpartiet)	7
Conservative Party (Høyre)	1
Liberal Party (Venstre)	4
Local List(s) (Lokale lister)	1
Total number of members:	13

Hemnes herredsstyre 1955–1959
Party name (in Norwegian)	Number of representatives
Labour Party (Arbeiderpartiet)	5
Conservative Party (Høyre)	1
Liberal Party (Venstre)	4
Local List(s) (Lokale lister)	3
Total number of members:	13

Hemnes herredsstyre 1951–1955
Party name (in Norwegian)	Number of representatives
Labour Party (Arbeiderpartiet)	4
Conservative Party (Høyre)	1
Liberal Party (Venstre)	4
Local List(s) (Lokale lister)	3
Total number of members:	12

Hemnes herredsstyre 1947–1951
Party name (in Norwegian)	Number of representatives
Labour Party (Arbeiderpartiet)	7
Conservative Party (Høyre)	1
Liberal Party (Venstre)	4
Total number of members:	12

Hemnes herredsstyre 1945–1947
Party name (in Norwegian)	Number of representatives
Labour Party (Arbeiderpartiet)	7
Liberal Party (Venstre)	3
Joint List(s) of Non-Socialist Parties (Borgerlige Felleslister)	1
Local List(s) (Lokale lister)	1
Total number of members:	12

Hemnes herredsstyre 1937–1941*
Party name (in Norwegian)	Number of representatives
Labour Party (Arbeiderpartiet)	6
Liberal Party (Venstre)	4
Joint List(s) of Non-Socialist Parties (Borgerlige Felleslister)	1
Local List(s) (Lokale lister)	1
Total number of members:	12
Note: Due to the German occupation of Norway during World War II, no elections were held for new municipal councils until after the war ended in 1945.

=== Mayors ===
The mayor (Norwegian: ordfører) of Hemnes Municipality is the political leader of the municipality and the chairperson of the municipal council. Here is a list of people who have held this position:

- 1839–1844: N. Myhre
- 1844–1847: Ole Eliassen
- 1848–1849: A.C. Wetlesen
- 1850–1851: Ole Eliassen
- 1852–1857: A.C. Wetlesen
- 1858–1861: O. Fredereksen
- 1862–1869: Ivar Rievertz Johansen
- 1870–1879: Arent C. Seljelid
- 1880–1885: Kristoffer Andersen
- 1886–1891: Georg Rathje Bardal
- 1892–1893: J. Berger
- 1894–1897: Odin Olsen Ramseng
- 1898–1898: Ole Johnsen Holmslet
- 1899–1901: Odin Olsen Ramseng
- 1902–1904: Rev. C.C. Dons
- 1905–1910: Saras Nielsen
- 1911–1914: J.O. Rydsaa
- 1914–1916: Wilhelm Theting
- 1917–1919: N. Boldermo
- 1919–1922: Per Drevvatne
- 1922–1926: Johan L. Finneide
- 1926–1928: Hans Jakobsen Drevvatne
- 1928–1929: M. Michaelsen (Ap)
- 1929–1931: K. Mollestad
- 1931–1940: Jens Jensen
- 1941–1941: Fr. Præstang
- 1941–1943: Johan Selseth
- 1943–1944: Trygve Langseth
- 1945–1945: Jens Jensen
- 1946–1951: Bjarne Paulsen (Ap)
- 1952–1959: Øystein Jenssen (V)
- 1959–1967: Kristen Pettersen Øverleir (Ap)
- 1968–1975: Ole Brygfjeld (Ap)
- 1976–1979: Harald Gullesen (Ap)
- 1980–1983: Nils Nermark (H)
- 1984–1995: Ørnulf Skjæran (Ap)
- 1996–1999: Nils Valla (Sp)
- 1999–2003: Per Jomar Hoel (Sp)
- 2003–2011: Kjell-Idar Juvik (Ap)
- 2011–2015: Kjell Joar Petersen-Øverleir (H)
- 2015–2019: Christine Trones (H)
- 2019–present: Paul Asphaug (Sp)

== Geography ==
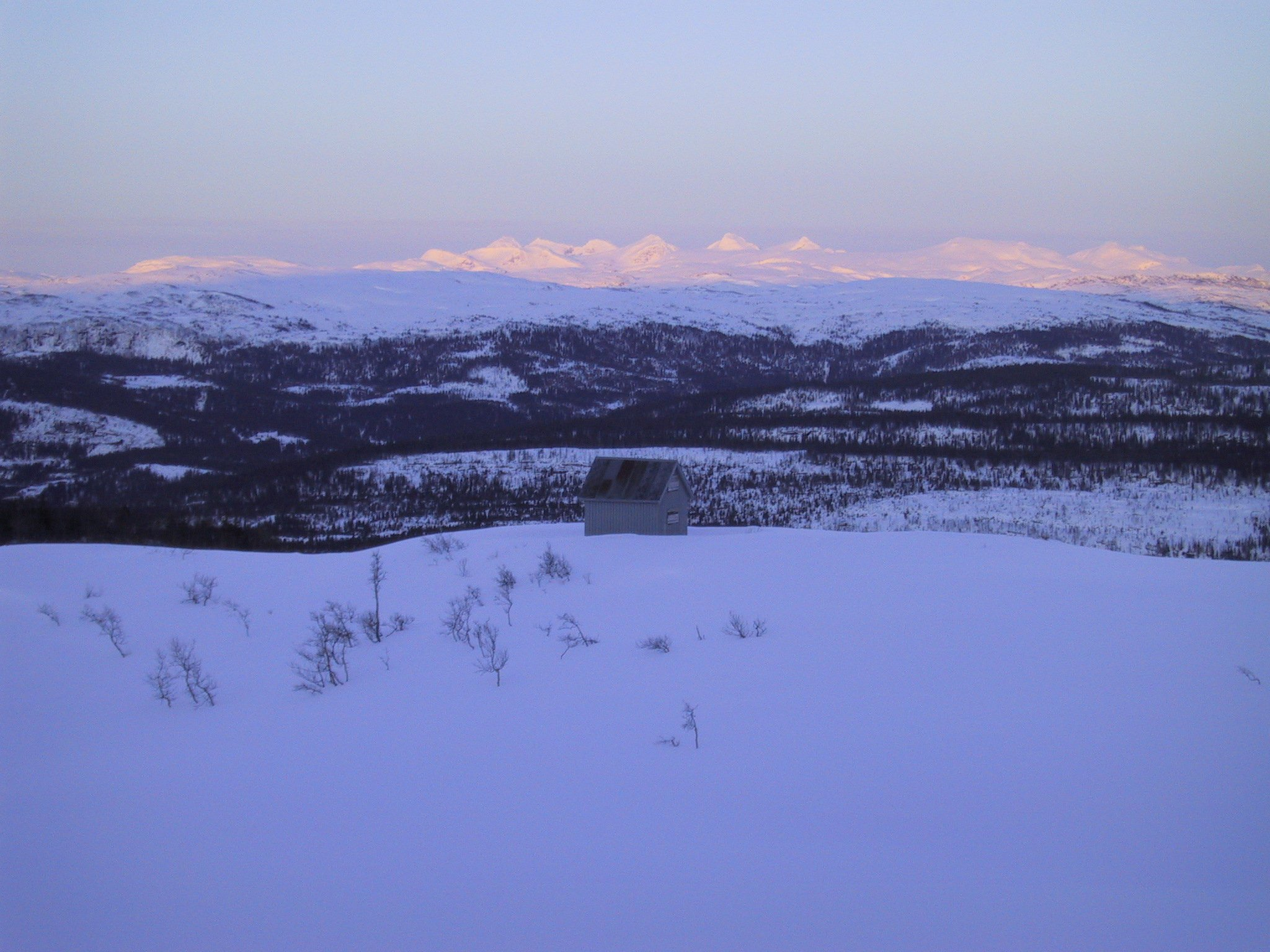
Okstindan range with Oksskolten, 1916 m, the highest mountain in North Norway.

The lake Røsvatnet (Southern Sami: Reevhtse) is a lake and reservoir lying partially in the southern part of Hemnes. It has been the site of human occupation since the Stone Age. Its area of 219 square kilometres (85 sq mi) makes it the second largest lake in Norway by surface area. Other lakes include Bleikvatnet, Grasvatnet, Stormålvatnet, and Stormyrbassenget.

The Okstindan mountain range is located in Hemnes, including the highest point in the municipality: the 1,915.75-metre (6,285.3 ft) tall Oksskolten. The large Okstindbreen glacier sits atop the mountain range.

=== Farms of Hemnes ===
==== Maps ====
Each map has a maximum number of listings it can display, so the map has been divided into parts consistent with the enumeration districts (Norwegian: tellingskrets) in the 1920 census. This map will include one farm name per farm number; other farm names or subdivision numbers may exist.

Hemnes, Korgen, 1920 Census Tellingskrets 1-8
Tellingskrets (enumeration districts): 1, Valla (lime); 2, Baklandet (red); 3, Oldernes (black); 4, Leirskaret (purple); 5, Krogen (green); 6, Brygfjelldalen (blue); 7, Sørfjellet (orange); 8, Kongsdalen (teal). List of farms:
1 147: Bjerkmo
2 148: Valla
3 149: Lillekjerka
4 100: Røsagauren
5 101: Røsaa
6 102: Millingsjordstrand
7 103: Solbakken
8 104: Engesmoen
9 105: Helbækmoen
10 132: Roghellen
11 142: Luren øvre
12 143: Luren ytre
13 144: Hjerpbakken
14 145: Olderneset
15 146: Tronsmoen
16 133: Brygfjeld
17 134: Skresletten
18 135: Tveraaen
19 136: Fjeldal
20 137: Trætbakken
21 138: Fenbakken
22 139: Skjeftmoen
23 140: Jamtfjorden
24 141: Meland
25 106: Valåmoen
26 107: Korgen
27 108: Villmoen
28 145: Sjøfossen
29 109: Bjurselvmo
30 110: Kyllingmo
31 111: Tømmermoen
32 126: Stabforsen
33 127: Gammelgården
34 128: Jordåbakken
35 129: Lillebrygfjell
36 130: Bjuråmo
37 131: Reinåmoen
38 112: Fagervoldli
39 113: Storskog
40 114: Flatmo
41 115: Forsmo
42 116: Bygdås
43 124: Bleikvasli
44 125: Krokselvmo
45 117: Svartvasmo
46 118: Kongsdal
47 119: Bleikvasfors
48 120: Oksfjellelv
49 121: Lenningsvik
50 122: Rabliaas
51 123: Smalsundmo
Hemnes, 1920 Census Tellingskrets 1, 4, 8, 9
Tellingskrets (enumeration districts): 1, Hemnesberget (red); 4, Sandnes - Leirvik (black); 8, Bjerka - Fineide (green); 9, Sund (blue). List of farms:
1 65: Hemnesberget
2 1: Sandnes
3 2: Osmoen
4 3: Nygaard
5 4: Hestnes
6 5: Stemnesvik
7 6: Mastervik
8 7: Leirvik
9 8: Vedaamo
10 9: Naverlid
11 10: Høines
12 11: Espervik
13 51: Bjerka
14 52: Breiviken
15 53: Finneide
16 54: Katstanden
17 55: Urland
18 56: Urlandåen
19 57: Holmstrand
20 58: Svalengen
21 59: Sæteren
22 60: Grønvikmo
23 61: Grønvik
24 42: Mula
25 43: Vægthaugkrok
26 44: Reinforsmoen
27 45: Nyrud
28 46: Langmyreng
29 47: Bjurbækdal
30 48: Forsbakken
31 49: Stien
32 50: Bjerkadal
33 62: Oterbrannsjøen
34 63: Sjøgården
35 64: Prestenget
36 66: Revehalsen

Note that tellingskrets 2, Brennberget - Straumgrenda, and 3, Utskarpen, are now in Rana municipality.
Tellingskrets 5, Elsfjorden; 6, Drevvatne skolekreds and 7, Luktvatne, are now in Vefsn Municipality.

==== Names and numbers ====
The farms in Hemnes Municipality as they are listed in O. Rygh's series Norske_Gaardnavne (lit. 'Norwegian farm names'), the Nordland volume of which was published in 1905.

See also: Digital version of Norske Gaardnavne - Nordland (in Norwegian)

The farm numbers are used in some census records, and numbers that are near each other indicate that those farms are geographically proximate. Handwritten Norwegian sources, particularly those prior to 1800, may use variants on these names. For recorded variants before 1723, see the digital version of O. Rygh.

Note that this list of farms does not adhere to the modern boundaries of Hemnes, but instead reflects the boundaries as O. Rygh knew them. Refer to their location on the map to determine which municipality they belong in now.

Farm names were often used as part of Norwegian names, in addition to the person's given name and patronymic or inherited surname. Some families retained the farm name, or toponymic, as a surname when they emigrated, so in those cases tracing a surname may tell you specifically where in Norway the family was from. This tradition began to change in the mid to late 19th century, and inherited surnames were codified into law in 1923.

If you can't find an entry when you are searching for a word that starts with AE, Ae, O, A or Aa, it may have been transcribed from one of those letters not used in English. Try looking for it under the Norwegian letter; Æ, Ø, and Å appear at the end of the Norwegian alphabet

Farm Name	Farm Number
Sandnes indre	1
Sandviken	1, 5
Osmo	2
Hestnesosen	3
Hestneset	4
Berntviken	4, 2
Brennesvik	5
Stomviken	5, 2
Blaabærviken	5, 3
Mastervik	6
Leirvik	7
Brattaamoen	7, 3
Vedaaen	8
Næverli	9
Høineset	10
Varpen	10, 2
Espervik	11
Fuglstrand	12
Skravlaa	13
Elsfjorden	14
Flotmoen	15
Svartkjønli	16
Vesterbækmo	17
Dyrhaug	18
Lillejorden	18, 3
Drevasbotnet	19
Bjørnstadmoen	19, 2
Leirfaldmoen	19, 4
Drevatnet	20
Sagbakken	20, 6
Rørenget	20, 7
Granneset	20, 9
Luktvasli, 1	21
Luktvasli, 2	22
Luktvasli, 3	23
Rundsvold	24
Skogsmo	25
Hjartli	26
Langmoen	26, 3
Luktvashoved	27
Bjerknes	28
Kjerringhalsen	29
Svartvatnet	30
Luktvatnet lille	31
Luktvasmo	32
Elsfjordosen	33
Tronmoen	34
Nymoen	34, 2
Forsmoen	35
Stormoen	36
Sagmoen	36, 2
Storvoldmoen	36, 4
Kobhaugen	37
Bakken	37, 2
Elsfjordstranden	38
Seljeli	39
Myrvik	40
Myrbækmoen	40, 2
Furuhatten	41
Mula	42
Vægthaugkraaen	43
Øninglien	44
Maalvatnet, 1	45
Maalvatnet, 2	46
Bjurbækdalen	47
Forsbakken	48
Bjerkadalen	49
Stien	49, 1
Bjerkadalen	50
Bjerka store	51
Breiviken	52
Langklevenget	52, 3
Finneid	53
Katstranden	54
Urland	55
Urlandaaen	56
Holmen	57
Svalingen	58
Inderviken	58, 4
Sæteren	59
Grønvikmoen	60
Grindviken	60, 2
Grønvik	61
Oterbranden	62
Lakshusneset	62, 3
Sund	63
Gløsen	63, 1
Staulen	63, 2
Sjøgaarden	63, 4
Sjøbakken	63, 6
Ekren	63, 8
Moan	63, 9
Ekreneset	63, 10
Præstenget	64
Hundnesdalen	64, 2
Hemnes	65
Gjeitvik	66
Høineset	66, 2
Buvik	67
Dilkestad, 1	68
Purkneset	68, 1
Aaenget	68, 2
Aspbakken	68, 5
Purkneshaugen	68, 6
Dilkestad, 2	69
Dalosen	70
Sletten	70, 3
Brubakken	70, 7
Ravnseng	70, 9
Faldhaala	70, 10
Steinhaugen	71
Utskarpen	72
Storholmen	73
Gjesbakken	74
Rørlien	75
Fuglmyrhaug	76
Storstranden	77
Landenget	77, 5
Bratland	78
Lilleberget	78, 4
Aaneset	78, 5
Kvitneset	79
Brennberget øvre	80
Brennberget nedre	81
Høikleppen	82
Brennbergfjeld	83
Brennberget indre	84
Laukhellen	84, 4
Seljehammeren	85
Strømsnes	86
Tybækken	87
Utland	88
Strømbotn	89
Medstrøm	90
Tverbæklien	91
Strømfors	92
Strømdalen	93
Nordenglien	94
Jamtjorden	95
Bjerklien	96
Strømbugten	97
Strømmen	98
__	__
Røssagauren	100
Røssaaen	101
Mellingsjorden	102
Traangmoen	102, 3
Solhaug	104
Engesmoen	104, 2
Samuelmoen	105
Valaamoen	106
Seljebakneset	106, 4
Korgen	107
Vildmoen	108
Bjurselvmoen	109
Kjukkelmoen	110
Tømmermoen	111
Fagervoldli	112
Langmoen	113
Groftremmen	114
Flatmoen	114, 2
Forsmoen	115
Bygdaasen	116
Svartvasmoen	117
Kongsdalen	118
Bleikvasforsen	119
Oksfjeldelven	120
Lenningsvik	121
Rapliaasen	122
Smalsundmoen	123
Bleikvaslien	124
Krokselvmoen	125
Stabbforsen	126
Brygfjelddalen	127
Ytterlien	128
Jordaabakken	128, 2
Brygfjeld lille	129
Bollermoen	130
Aaenget	131
Holmsletten	132
Brygfjeld store	133
Skresletten	134
Tveraaen	135
Fjelddal	136
Trætbakken	137
Finbakken	138
Skjeftmoen	139
Leirskaret	140
Meland	141
Leiren øvre	142
Leiren ytre	143
Jerpbakken	144
Olderneset	145
Troneset	146
Leiren nedre	147
Valla	148
Svebakken	148, 5
Libakken	148, 7
Bjerka lille	149

== Notable people ==
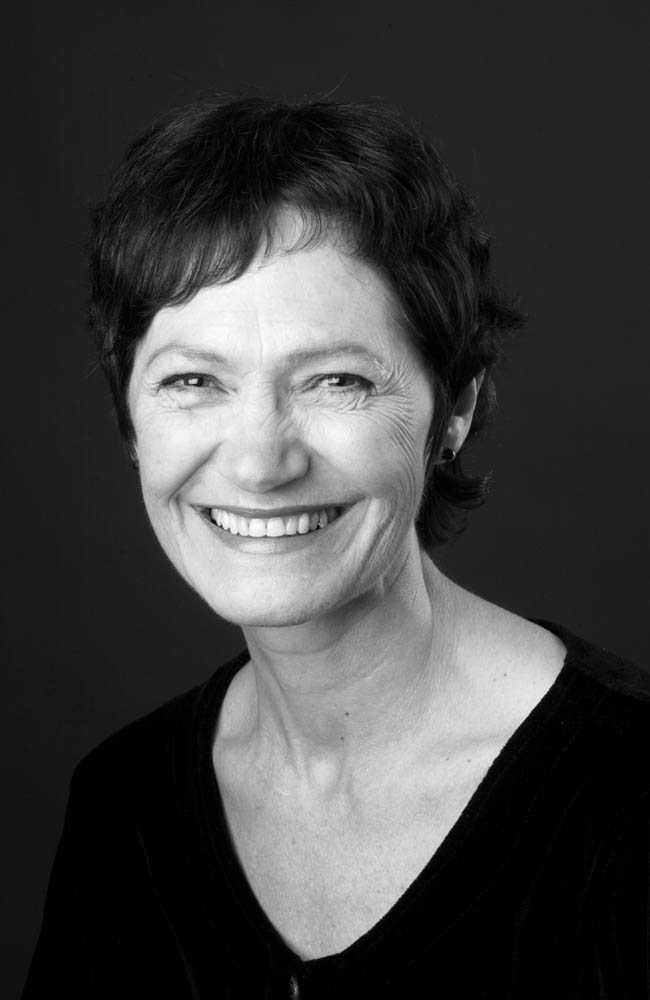
Laila Stien,2007

- Kristen Rivertz, (Norwegian Wiki) (1862–1937), an architect
- Johan Albrigt Rivertz (1874 in Korgen – 1942), a judge on the Supreme Court of Norway
- Erling Falk (1887 in Hemnesberget - 1940), a Norwegian politician, ideologist, and writer
- Christen Finbak, (Norwegian Wiki) (1904–1954), a chemist and physicist
- Egil Kraggerud (born 1939 in Hemnes), a philologist
- Laila Stien (born 1946 in Hemnes), a novelist, poet, and author of children's literature
- Gerd-Liv Valla (born 1948), a former trade union leader who grew up near Bjerka
- Reidar Sørensen (born 1956 in Hemnesberget), a Norwegian stage and film actor
- Kjell-Idar Juvik (born 1966 in Hemnesberget), a politician who was Mayor of Hemnes from 2003–2011
- Børge Petersen-Øverleir (born 1967 in Hemnesberget), a guitarist
