= Korgen =

Village in Hemnes Municipality, Norway

- Village
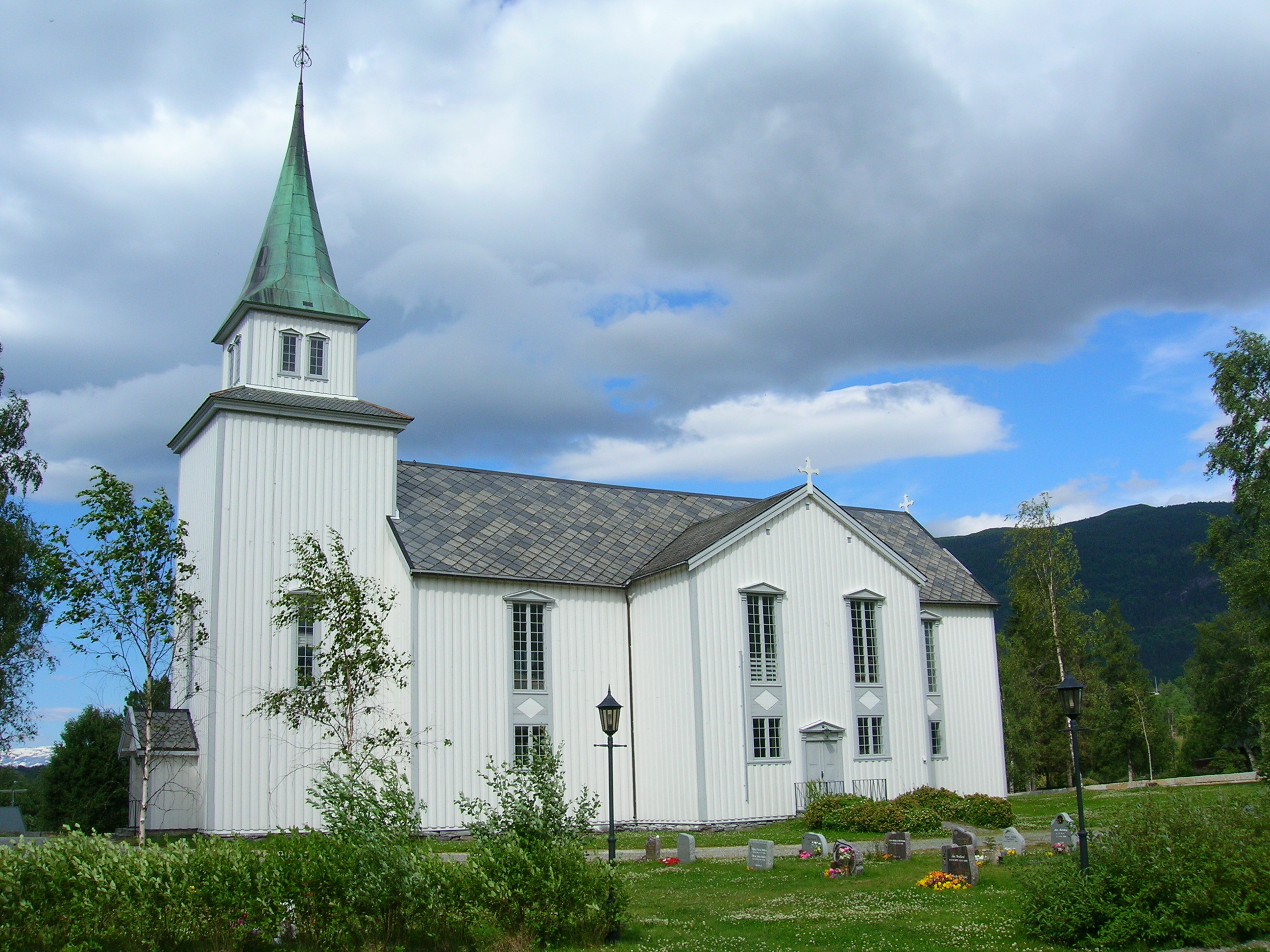
- View of the local church
- Interactive map of Korgen
- Location within Nordland Location within Norway
- Coordinates: 66.0766°N 13.8216°E
- Country: Norway
- Region: Northern Norway
- County: Nordland
- District: Helgeland
- Municipality: Hemnes Municipality

Area
  - Total: 0.98 km^{2} (0.38 sq mi)
- Elevation: 17 m (56 ft)

Population (2024)
  - Total: 912
  - Density: 931/km^{2} (2,410/sq mi)
- Time zone: UTC+01:00 (CET)
  - Summer (DST): UTC+02:00 (CEST)
- Post Code: 8646 Korgen

Korgen is the administrative centre of Hemnes Municipality in Nordland county, Norway. The village located along the river Røssåga, about 8 kilometres (5.0 mi) south of the village of Bjerka. Korgen is connected by the European route E6 highway to the nearby towns of Mo i Rana and Mosjøen. The eastern end of the Korgfjell Tunnel is located in Korgen. The village of Bleikvassli lies about 20 kilometres (12 mi) to the south along the Norwegian County Road 806. The 0.98-square-kilometre (240-acre) village has a population (2024) of 912 and a population density of 931 inhabitants per square kilometre (2,410/sq mi). This makes it the largest urban area in the municipality.

Korgen Church is a cruciform church that's been located in the village since 1863. It was built of timber and has 450 seats. Korgen Sports Club (Korgen Idrettslag) was founded in 1935 as a sports club for Korgen. The sports club has sports like skiing, soccer, orienteering and team handball. The village was the administrative centre of the old Korgen Municipality from 1918 until its dissolution in 1964.

Korgen was also used as a satellite prison camp during World War Two, mainly for Yugoslavian population.

== Industry ==
The Norwegian state owned electricity company Statkraft operates electricity production facilities including the Nedre Røssåga power plants located in Vesterli in Korgen and Øvre Røssåga power plants located in Bleikvasslia. The development of these plants were started in 1948 and was completed in 1955. Statkraft has also built a regional office, located near the municipality building in Korgen.

== Geography ==
Korgen is situated inland and is surrounded by mountains. Southwest towards Mosjøen lies the Korgfjellet (Vesterfjellet) mountain range, to the east is Klubben, and to the north towards Mo i Rana is Kangsen. Korgen lies close to Okstindan, the mountain range which includes the mountain Oksskolten, the highest mountain in North Norway.

=== Korgfjellet ===
Many Norwegians have heard about Korgen because of the notorious Korgfjellet mountain range which is situated between Hemnes Municipality and Vefsn Municipality. The mountains form the boundary in a north-south direction between Korgen and Elsfjord. Korgfjellet had frequently has divided the region in half due to poor road conditions and traffic accidents during the winter. This condition is now avoided after the finishing of the Korgfjell Tunnel in 2005.
