= Hemnesberget =

Village in Hemnes Municipality, Norway

- Village
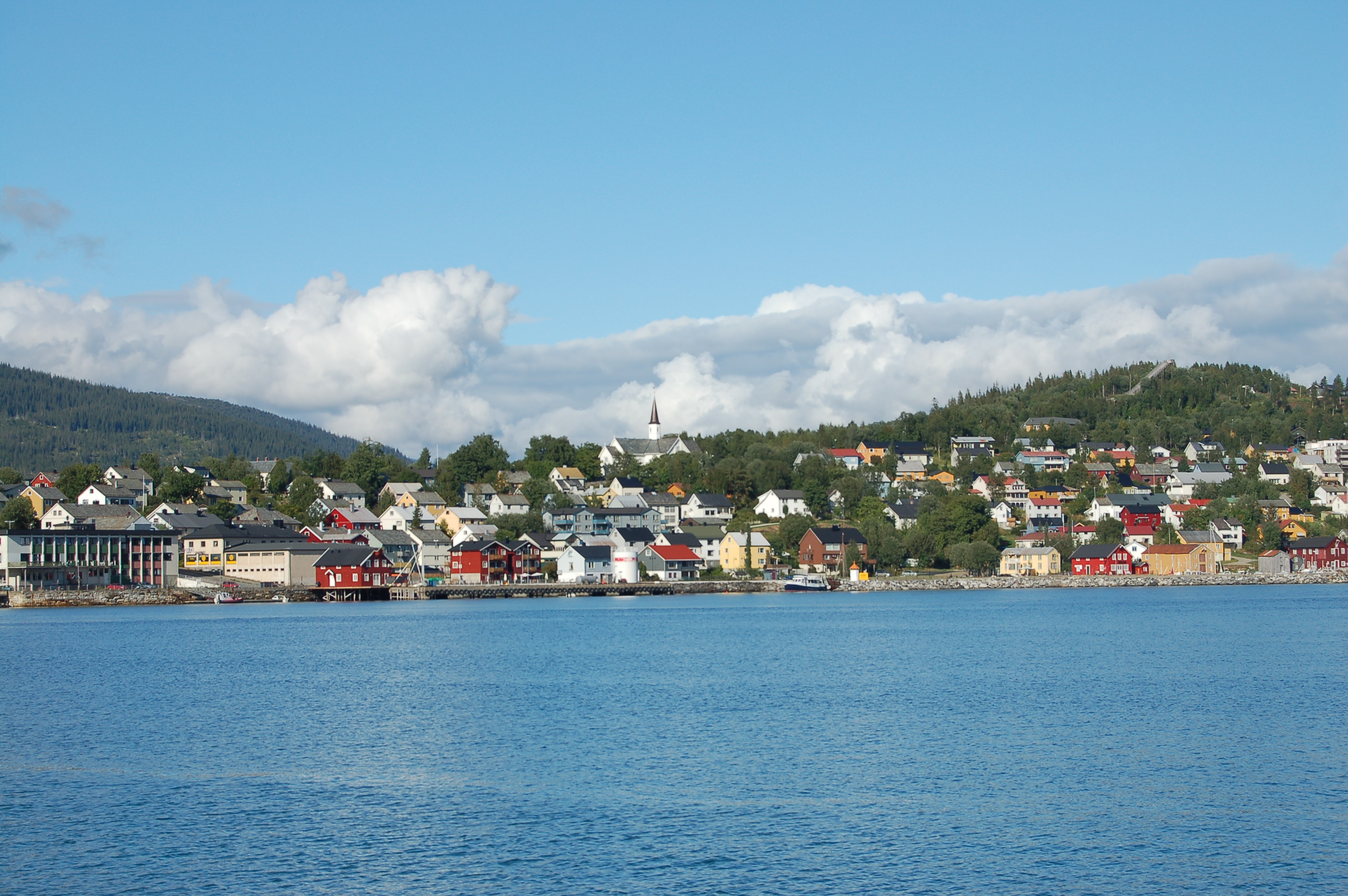
- View of the village
- Interactive map of Hemnesberget
- Location within Nordland Location within Norway
- Coordinates: 66.2249°N 13.6164°E
- Country: Norway
- Region: Northern Norway
- County: Nordland
- District: Helgeland
- Municipality: Hemnes Municipality

Area
  - Total: 1.11 km^{2} (0.43 sq mi)
- Elevation: 39 m (128 ft)

Population (2024)
  - Total: 1,335
  - Density: 1,203/km^{2} (3,120/sq mi)
- Time zone: UTC+01:00 (CET)
  - Summer (DST): UTC+02:00 (CEST)
- Post Code: 8640 Hemnesberget

Hemnesberget is a village in Hemnes Municipality in Nordland county, Norway. It is located on the Hemnes peninsula which lies on the south side of the Ranfjorden. Hemnes Church is located in this village.

The 1.11-square-kilometre (270-acre) village has a population (2024) of 1,335 and a population density of 1,203 inhabitants per square kilometre (3,120/sq mi).

== World War II ==
The village was partially destroyed in the land fighting first and the later by naval gunfire, with the sinking of the Hurtigruten ship SS Nordnorge and the coaster Ranheim, in the days following 10 May 1940. The fighting occurred when Hemnesberget became the objective of a German operation to bypass Allied strong points during the Norwegian Campaign, codenamed Wildente.
