= Hovet, Buskerud =

Village in Hol, Buskerud, Norway

Coordinates: 60°37′21″N 8°09′28″E

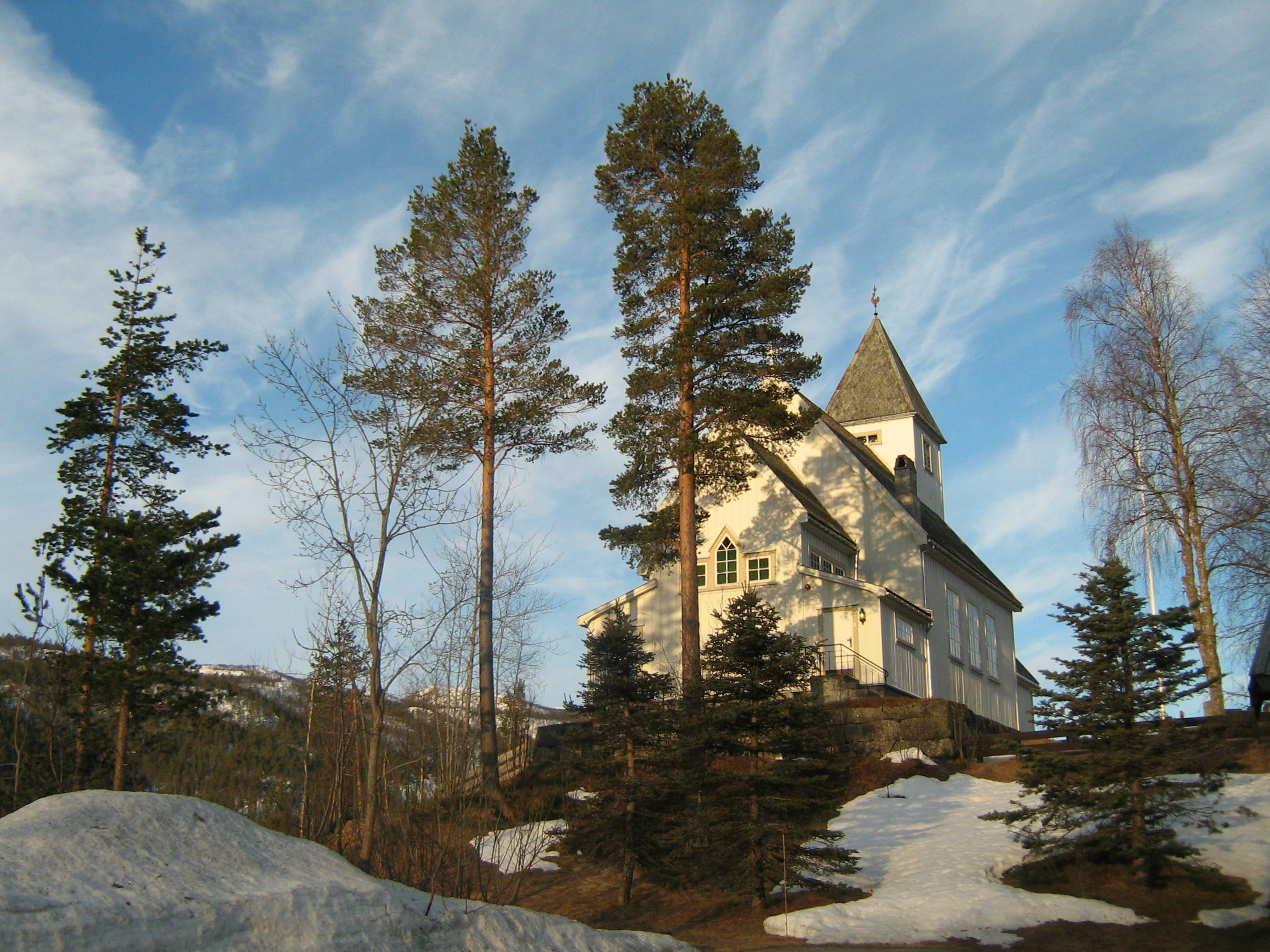
Hovet Church

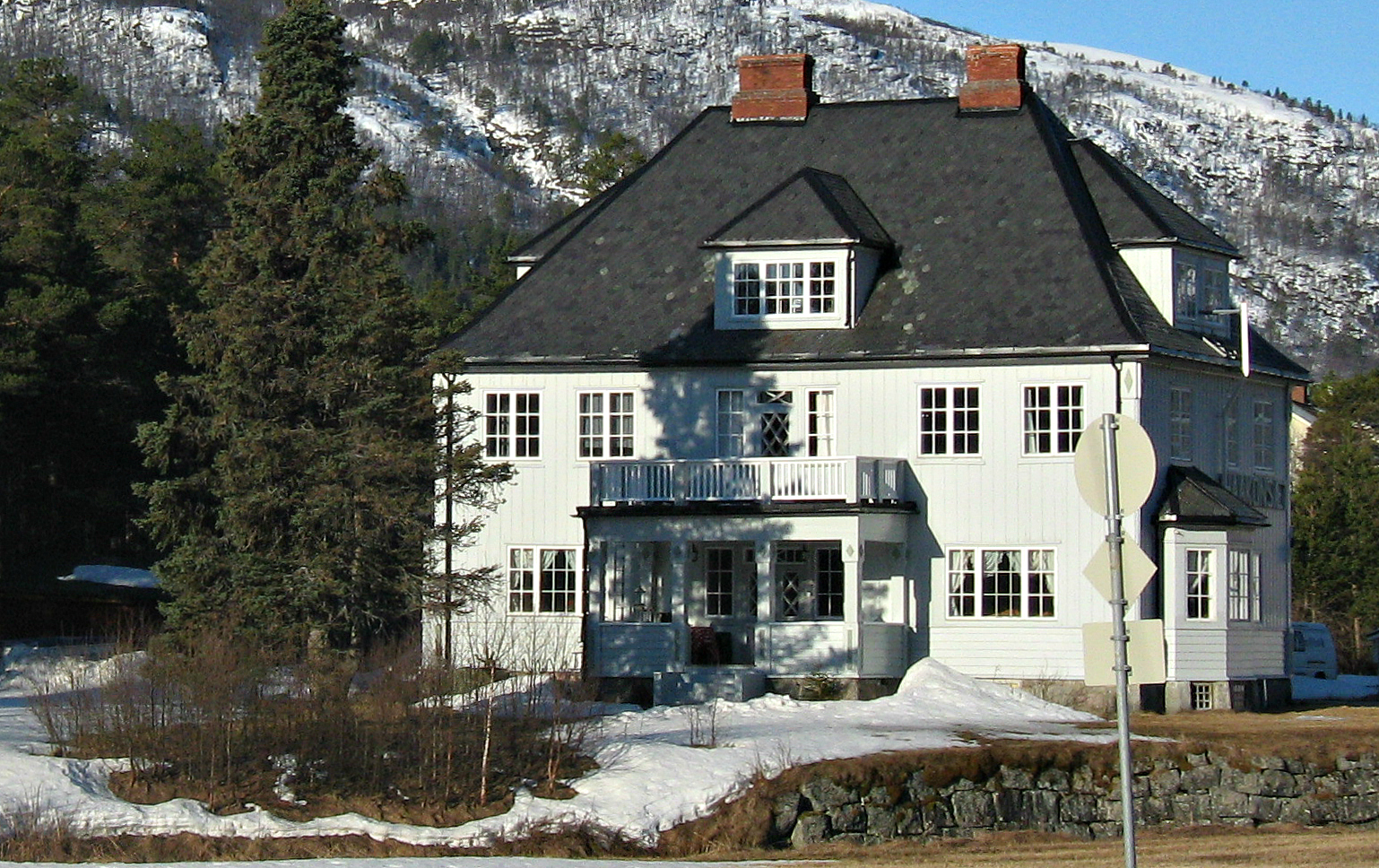
Håkonsæt Fjellvilla

Hovet is a mountain village in Hol, Buskerud, Norway.

Hovet is located between Strandavatnet and Hovsfjorden. Hovet is the site of Hovet Chapel (Hovet kapell). The church is located in the south-east slope of a hill that shoots out into the valley from the north. It was constructed from drawings prepared by architect Ole Stein and inaugurated in 1910. The walls are built of timber frame and rest on a grouted natural stone foundation. All roofs are covered with slate.

Håkonsæt Fjellvilla is a mountain villa. It is situated in the centre of Hovet, near Hallingskarvet National Park, 15 minutes from Skisenter Hallingskarvet in Sudndalen, Hovet. and 20 min from the ski resorts of Geilo.

== Hallingdal ==
Hovet belongs to the traditional district of Hallingdal, the Halling Valley, created by the Hallingdalselva or Hallingdal River. "Elva" is Norwegian for river. The Hallingdal River, also named "big river" or Storåni, originates from the Hardangervidda national park, streams via Hallingskarvet national park into the Hivju River, and from there into the Hivjufossen. The Hivjufossen streams into the river Storåne, which originates from two different mountainous areas: 1. the Geiteryggen area into the direction of Sudndalen, via the Hivjufossen outflow, into the direction of Hovet, and 2. the plateau of Stolsvatnet. These two river branches unite at the cross road of the FV50 and Grønsetlivegen in Hovet, named Storåne, which streams out into the Hovsfjorden, to follow its course from there, deeper into the valley of Hallingdal, as Hallingdalselva, into the direction of Oslo.

== Hallingdal dialect ==
The residents of Hovet speak one of the several Hallingdal dialects, which are known as Hallingmål. These dialects have been studied, analysed, and compared with each other. The language of the Vikings, the old Norwegian language, gammel norsk, is still present in the Norwegian dialects. The areas in Norway that have been isolated from the modernising world have saved the old Norwegian language for disappearing. Centuries after the end of the deadly disease Black Death which took the lives of at least the half of the Norwegian people between 1347 and 1351, the Danish invaded Norway. Norway belonged to Denmark from 1523 (Kalmar Union) till 17 May 1814. The Danish and Norwegian language merged into what we know now as Bokmål, the official language, which exists next to the Nynorsk language.

== Natural monuments ==
- Hovsfjorden is a nature reserve, a reservoir lake and partially a wetland.
- Hivjufossen, a 250 meters high waterfall, at the border of national park Hallingskarvet
- Strandavatnet, a regulated lake, at the border of national park Hallingskarvet
- Stolsvatnet, a regulated lake and a unique biotope.

== Notable residents ==
1. Pål Olson Grøt ~ Rosemåling painter.
2. Kristian Øvrevollseie ~ fiddler of traditional music
3. Per Villand ~ Molecular biologist; scholar; author of the book: "Søre Villand og Raggsteindalen 1889-2005 : slekta, garden og turisthytta"; contributed to the research of amyotrophic lateral sclerosis; the main character of a 2005 documentary about ALS, produced by Lillehammer University College.
4. Knut Bry ~ art photographer.
5. Rudi Juchelka ~ sculptor and fine artist
6. Håvard Bøkko ~ speedskater
7. Hege Bøkko ~ speedskater

== Etymology ==
The name "Hovet", and some other names in Hovet as a village, might be related with the Vikings. The literal translation of the place name "Hovet" is: "the hov". The word "hov" can be found in literature about sacred spaces in Viking law and religion, where is explained that "hov" is an old Norwegian word for "shrine".

A common place name element is hov (Old Norwegian), or hof, which denotes a heathen shrine. Scholars, however, do not believe it likely that all of the hof names originally meant "temple" or "shrine", rather most would have referred to a small building or area of a farmstead devoted to heathen worship. There is no evidence of buildings used solely as pagan temples being widespread in Scandinavia. As almost all of the places with names compounded in hof are actually farmsteads, an original meaning along the lines of "farm where cult meetings were held by the locals" might be more appropriate (Sproston).

Also the old Norwegian word "land" is related with pagan sites of worships. In Hovet the name Villand (Vill land means: Wild land) is often present: Villandsvegen, an area named Villand, where two families with this name live, the one family lives in Nørdre Villand, the northern side of the Villandsvegen, the other family lives at the southern side of the Villandsvegen, in Søre Villand. They are not relatives. When watching more upward on the same Hol Kommune map there is a pond named Villandstjødne on Mapcarta, tagged also as Villandstjørne as the Norwegian name, what might be an indication that stjødne is the dialect word in Hallingdal for stjørne. On the Hol Kommune map this pond is named Villandstjørne. The name Villandstjørne is a combination of the name Villand and tjørne. Tjørne is: lake, pond, tarn. Villandstjørne means the pond of Villand.

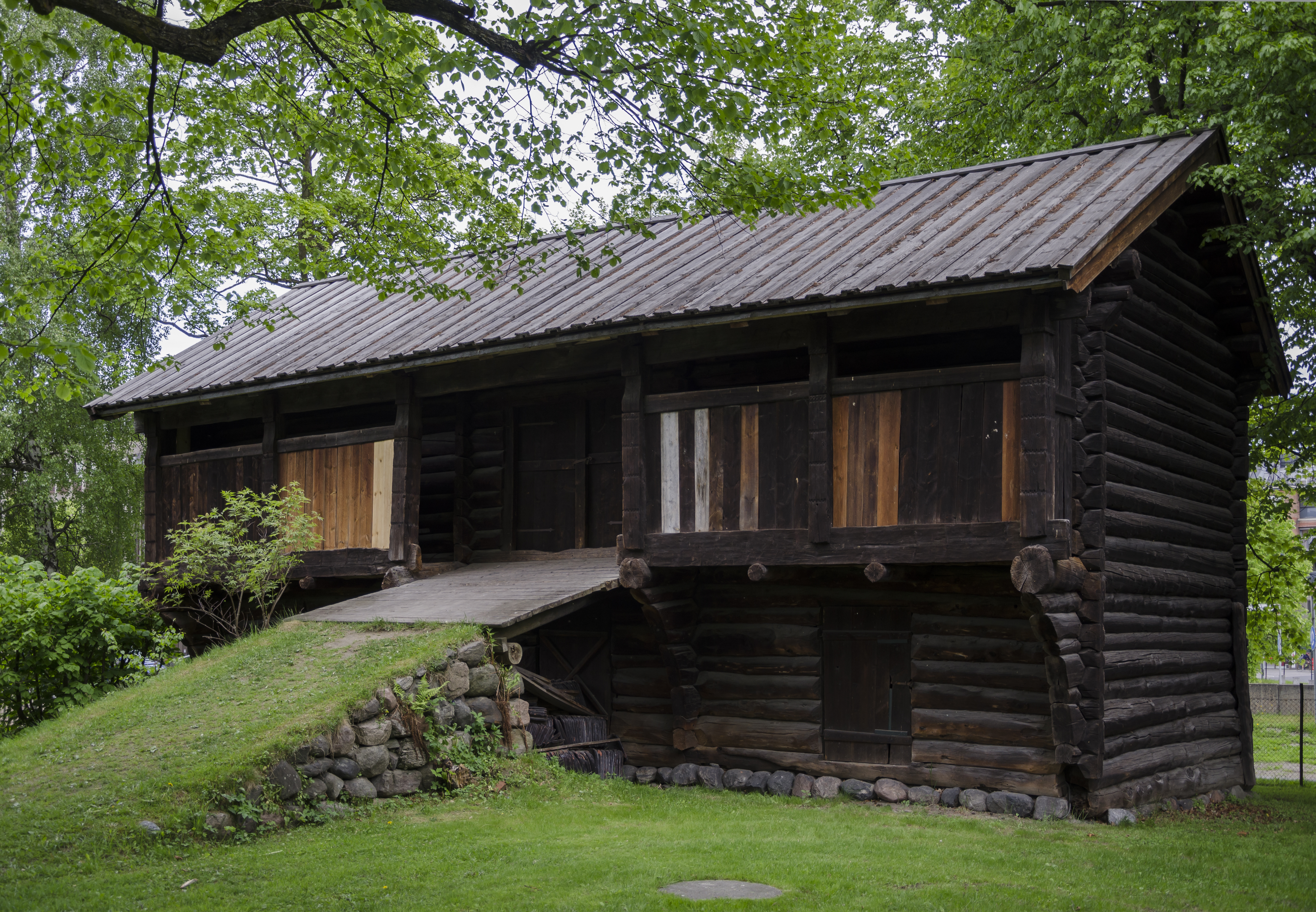
Stable from Søre Villand, built in the later 1700s, purchased by the museum in 1918, taken down in 1919 and resurrected at Marienlyst in 1922.

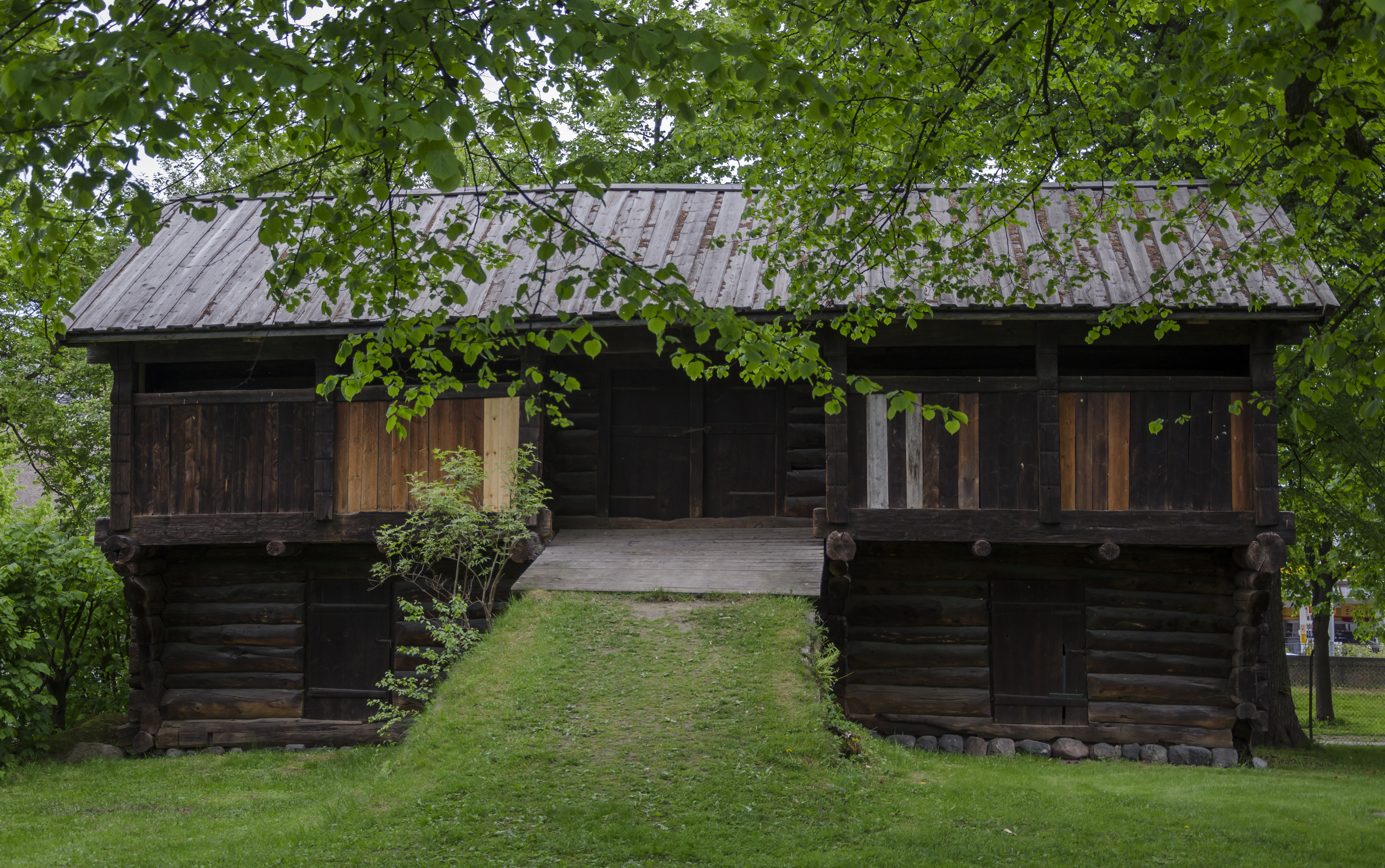
Stable from Søre Villand, built in the later 1700s, purchased by the museum in 1918, taken down in 1919 and resurrected at Marienlyst in 1922.

More names in the same area of Villandstjødne refer to sacred spaces in the Viking law and religion: Mørk, Mörk in Old Norwegian, meaning: forest, and categorized as sacred woods and groves. Very near to Villand is an area with the name Mørk; Hovsfjorden contains the word hov and fjorden. Both words are related with sacred spaces: hov (shrine) and fjörðr, old Norwegian for the word fjord, categorized in sacred spaces as bodies of water; Nese, headland where the river Storåne streams into Hovsfjorden. In the name Nese is the old Norwegian word Nes, which means headland, and which belongs to the sacred spaces of bodies of water; Vikabergi, next to Hovsfjorden, contains the old Norwegian name Vik, which means inlet. Vik is categorized as a sacred space of bodies of water; Torsbunatten is a hill. The name could be divided into «Tor»: the mythical god Thor, «bu», old Norwegian for several explanations of simple buildings, like a little house in nature, and «natten» as the Norwegian word for night. Other possibility could be to divide it in «Tor», and «bunatten», as a possible plural form of bunad in the Hallingdal dialect. Bunad is a traditional costume in Norway. The plural form of bunad however in Norwegian is bunader, not bunatten.

== History ==
- Digitalt Museum - Old photos of Hovet
- Hol Bygdemuseum - Old buildings of Hovet
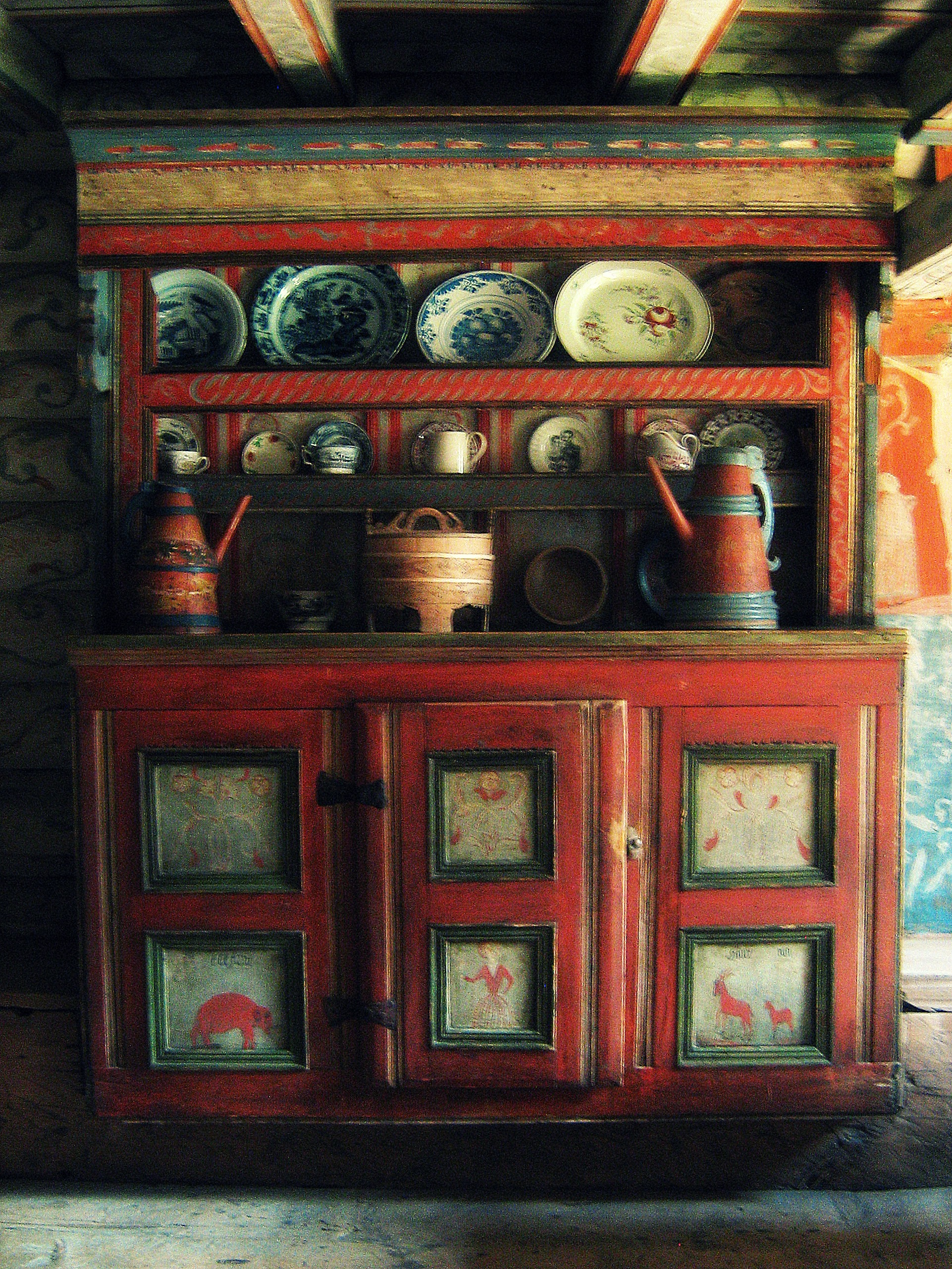
Bygdemuseum / Cabinet

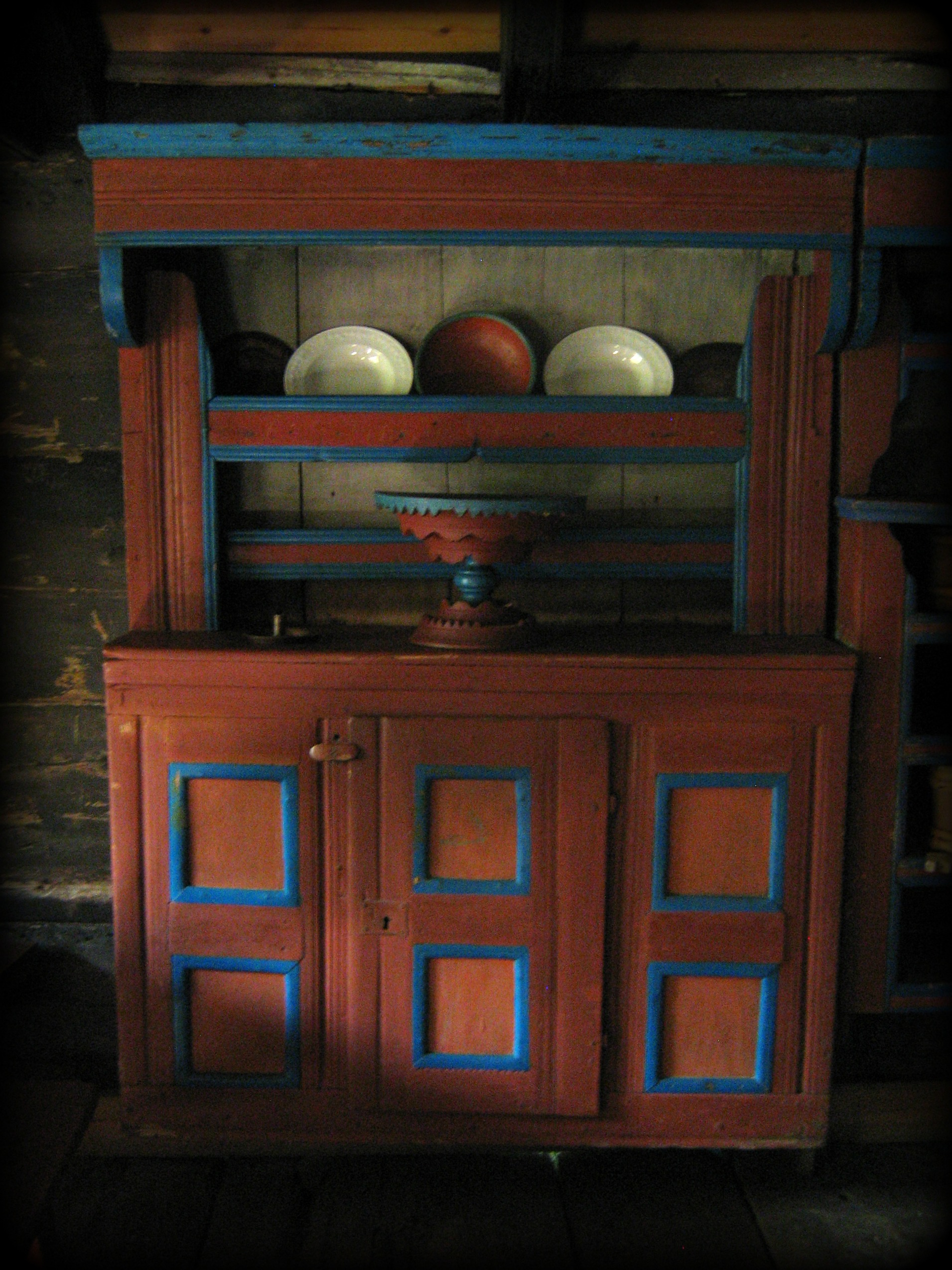
Bygdemuseum / Cabinet

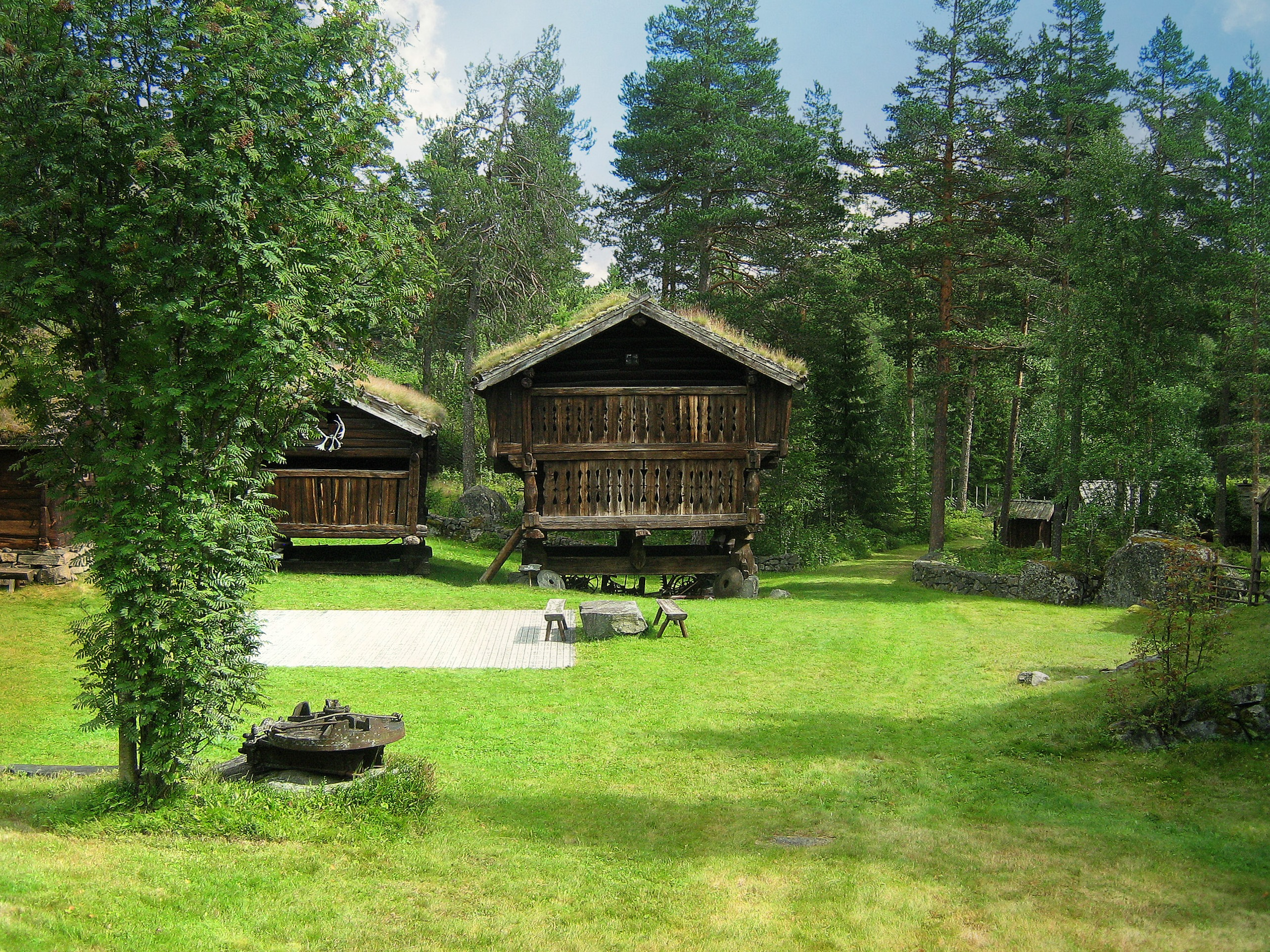
"Loft fra Ovavoll i Hovet" - The loft from Ovavoll in Hovet can be from the 16th century. It is built of rough six-lined timber on the ground floor and somewhat smaller, around the logs on the second floor. The loft is on wooden beams and has a peat roof. It was moved to the Bygdemuseum in Hol in 1938. On the ground floor they stored food. In the second floor they had wooden cases for clothes, and the "onnejentene" slept here in summer.

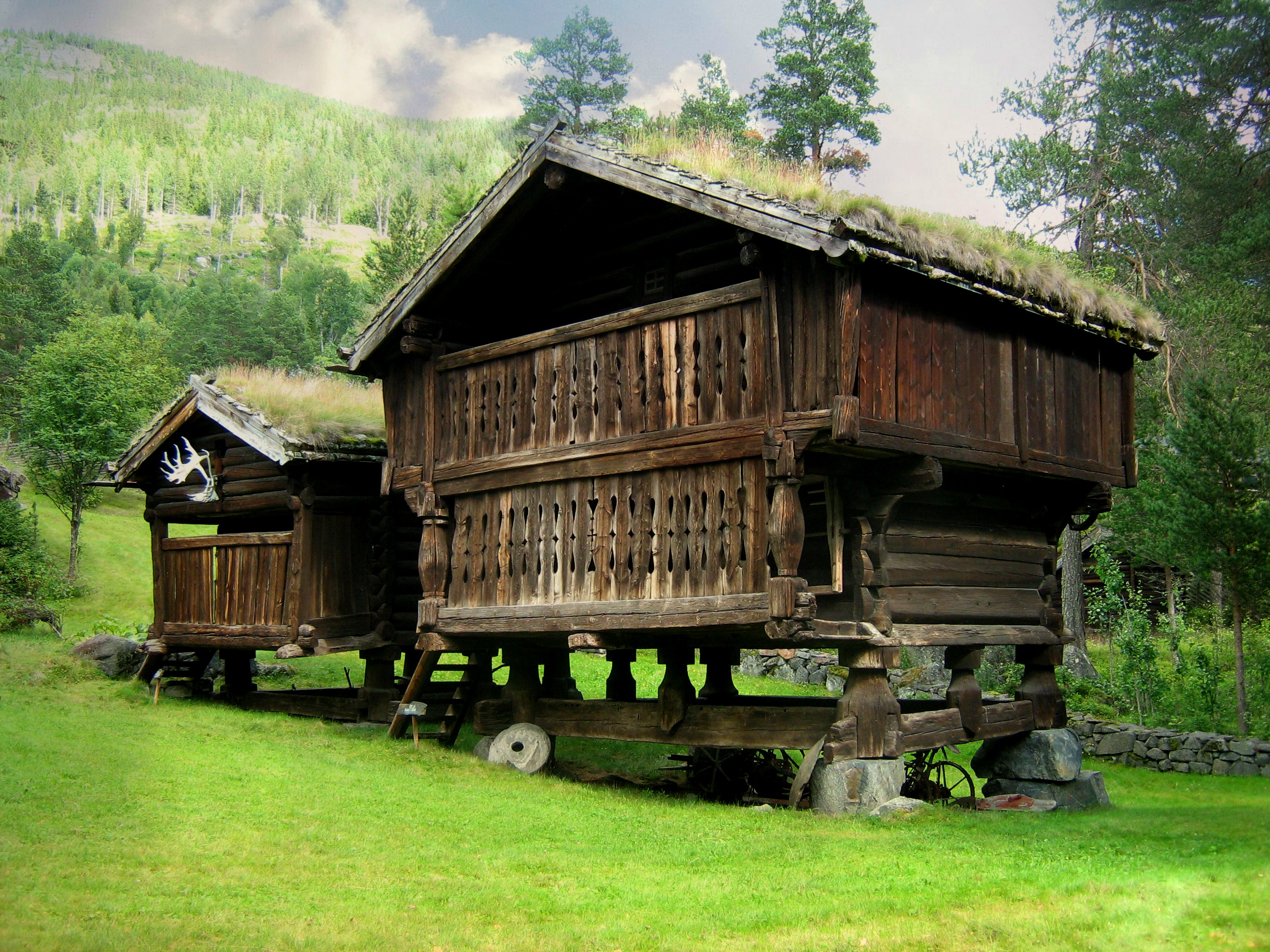
"Loft fra Ovavoll i Hovet" - The loft from Ovavoll in Hovet can be from the 16th century. It is built of rough six-lined timber on the ground floor and somewhat smaller, around the logs on the second floor. The loft is on wooden beams and has a peat roof. It was moved to the Bygdemuseum in Hol in 1938. On the ground floor they stored food. In the second floor they had wooden cases for clothes, and the "onnejentene" slept here in summer.

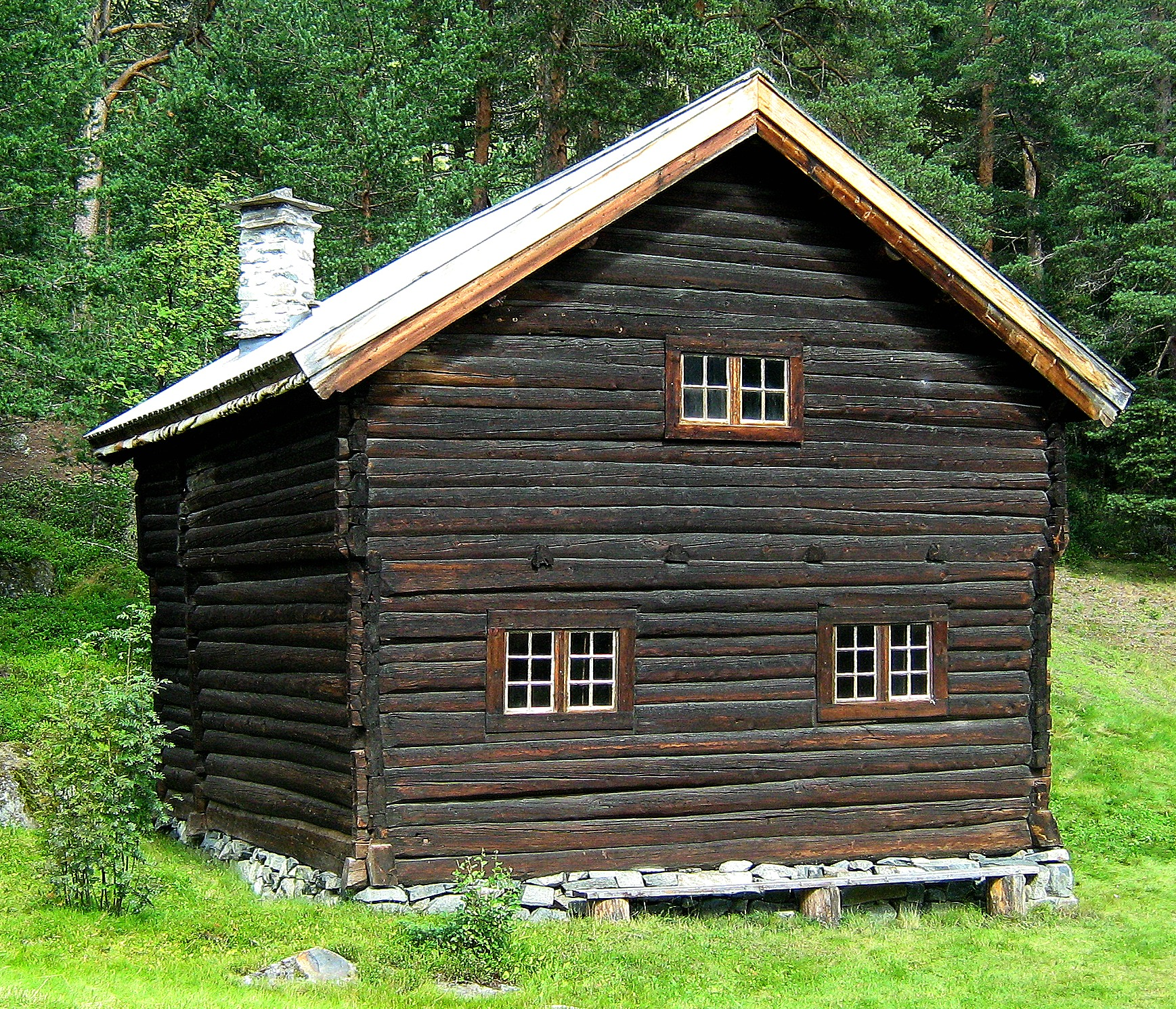
"Nestegardstugu fra Nestegard i Hovet" - This loft house from Nestegard in Hovet was built in the beginning of the 18th century as a living room and guest room with sleeping loft upstairs. It has 2 floors, built in timber and with peat roofs. The first floor is a 3-room stugu with hallway, stugu and stick. Roofs, walls, cabinets and bed are painted in the Rosemåling style by Kittil Rygg in 1759. The house was moved along with the Nestegard farm in 1751, and brought to the museum in 1936.

== Literature ==
- Ellingsgard, Nils (1978): "Rosemåling i Hallingdal" - Dreyers Forlag Oslo, 1978; ISBN 82-09-01493-5
- Hattfjelldal folkebibliotek: Ellingsgard, Nils (1978): "Rosemåling i Hallingdal"
- Hilda Roderick Ellis Davidson (1989): Myths and Symbols in Pagan Europe: Early Scandinavian and Celtic Religions
- Kåre Olav Solhjell: Hol i hundre år', Bind III, p. 485 ~ Trykk: 07-Gruppen, Oslo ~ ISBN 978-82-995751-4-0
- Per Villand: Søre Villand og Raggsteindalen 1889-2005 : slekta, garden og turisthytta; Geilo Bibliotek, Hol municipality, Norway

== Gallery ==
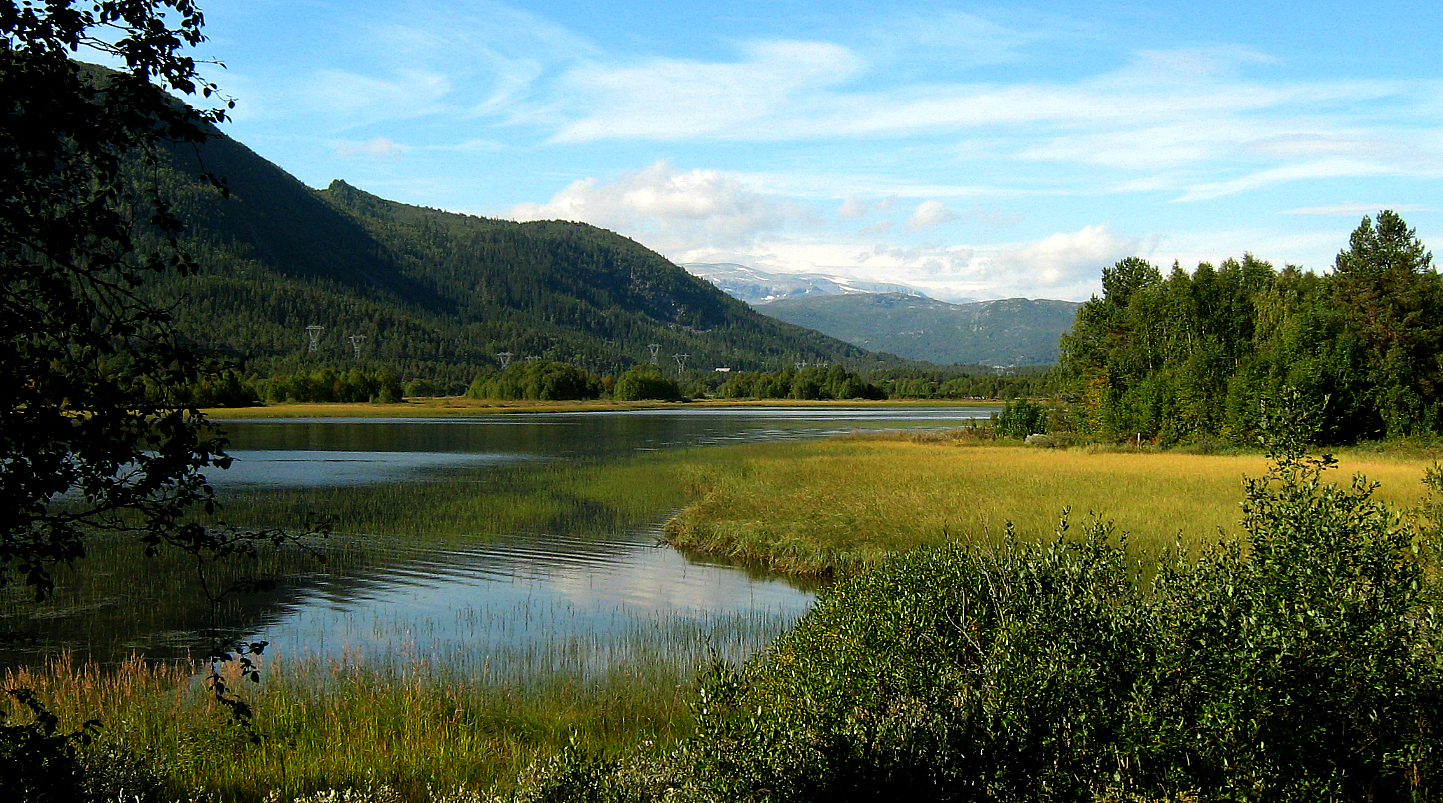
Hovsfjorden is a nature reserve, and is a part of the river Storåni.

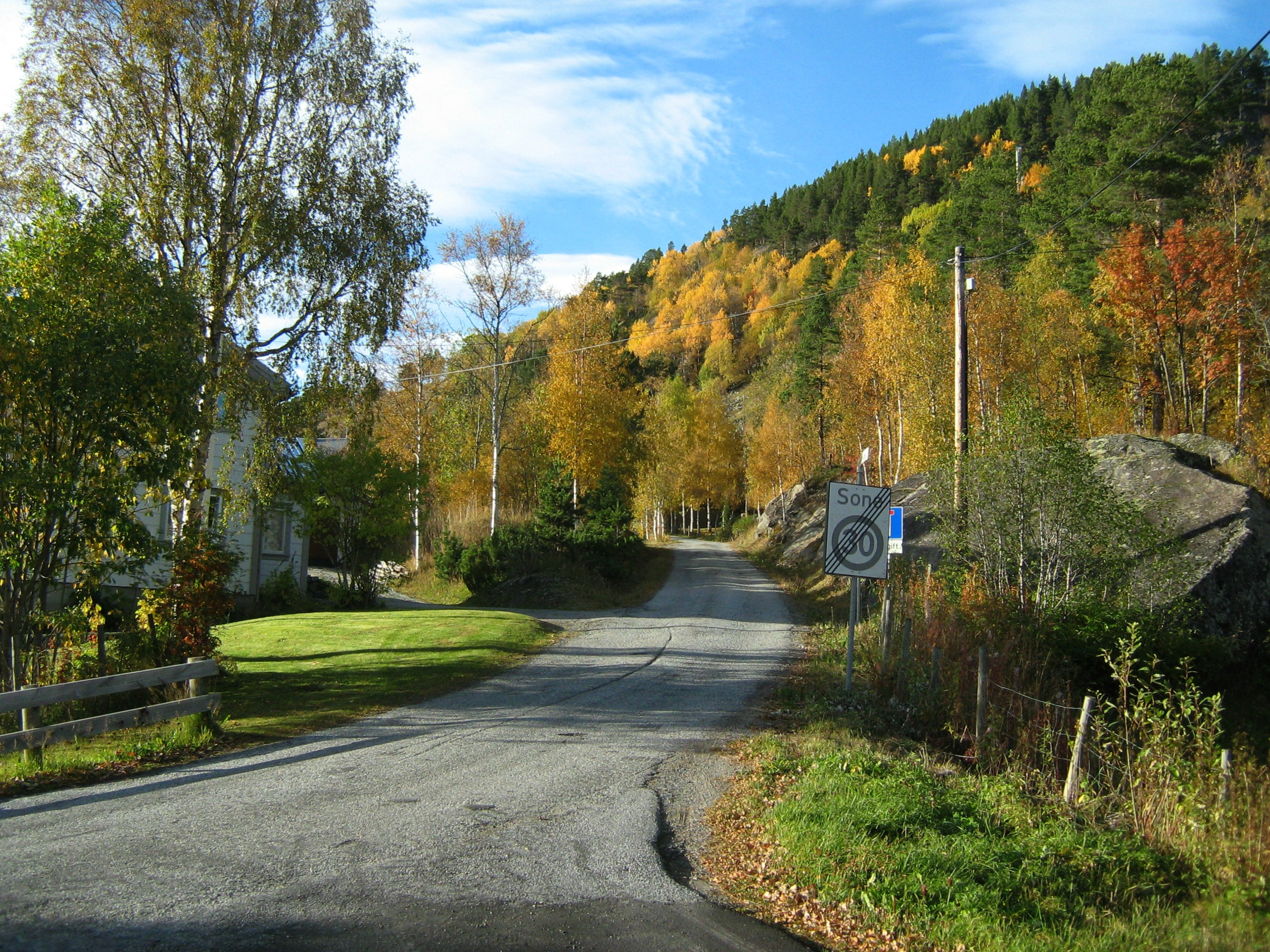
Autumn in Norway is the most colourful season of the year and because of the intense colours it is a real attraction for photographers.

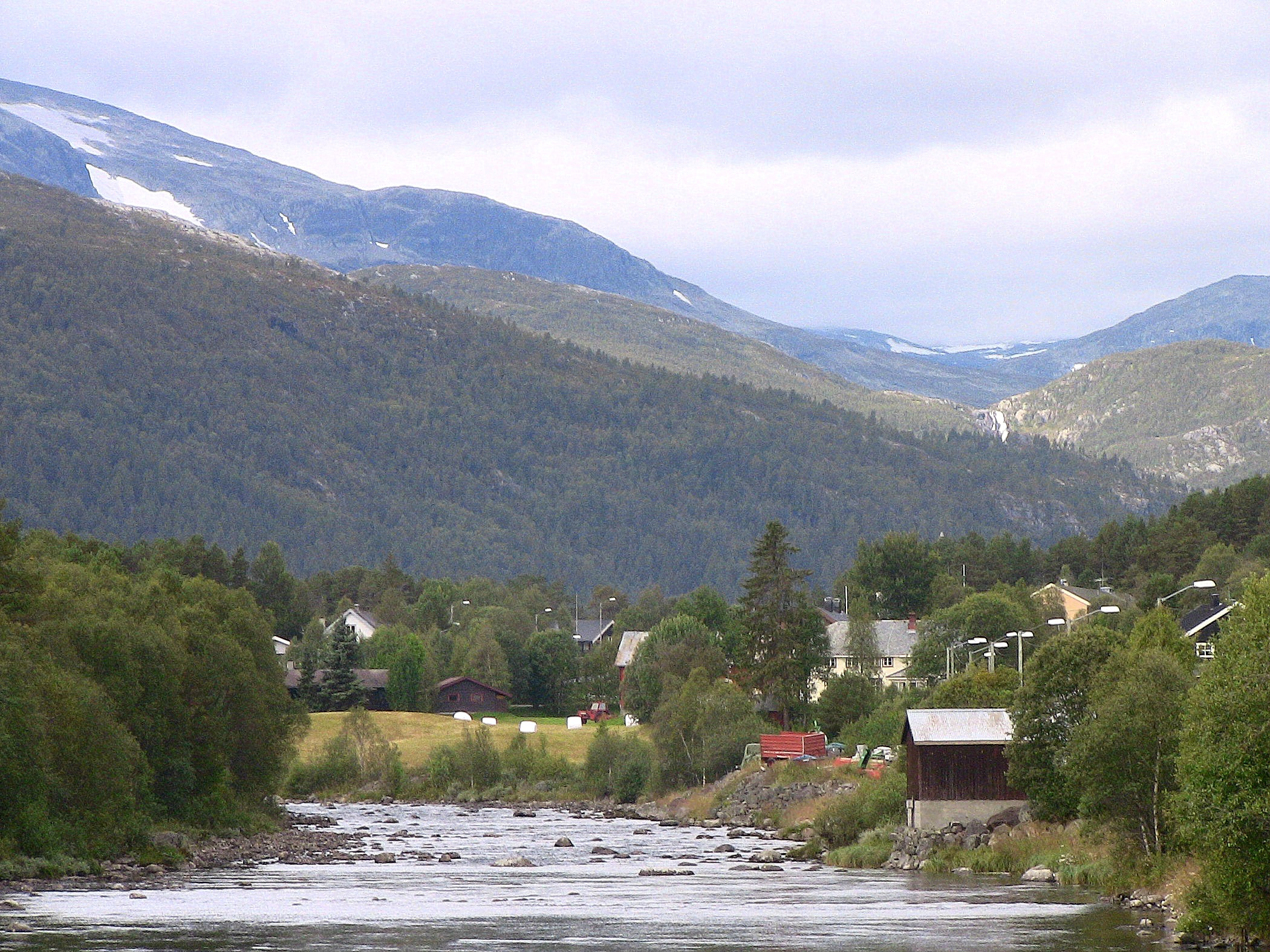
Hovet is located on the border of national park Hallingskarvet, a huge mountainous area. The river Storåni is filled with melting water from the Hallingskarvet mountains, streaming into the Hallingdalselva, into the direction of Oslo.

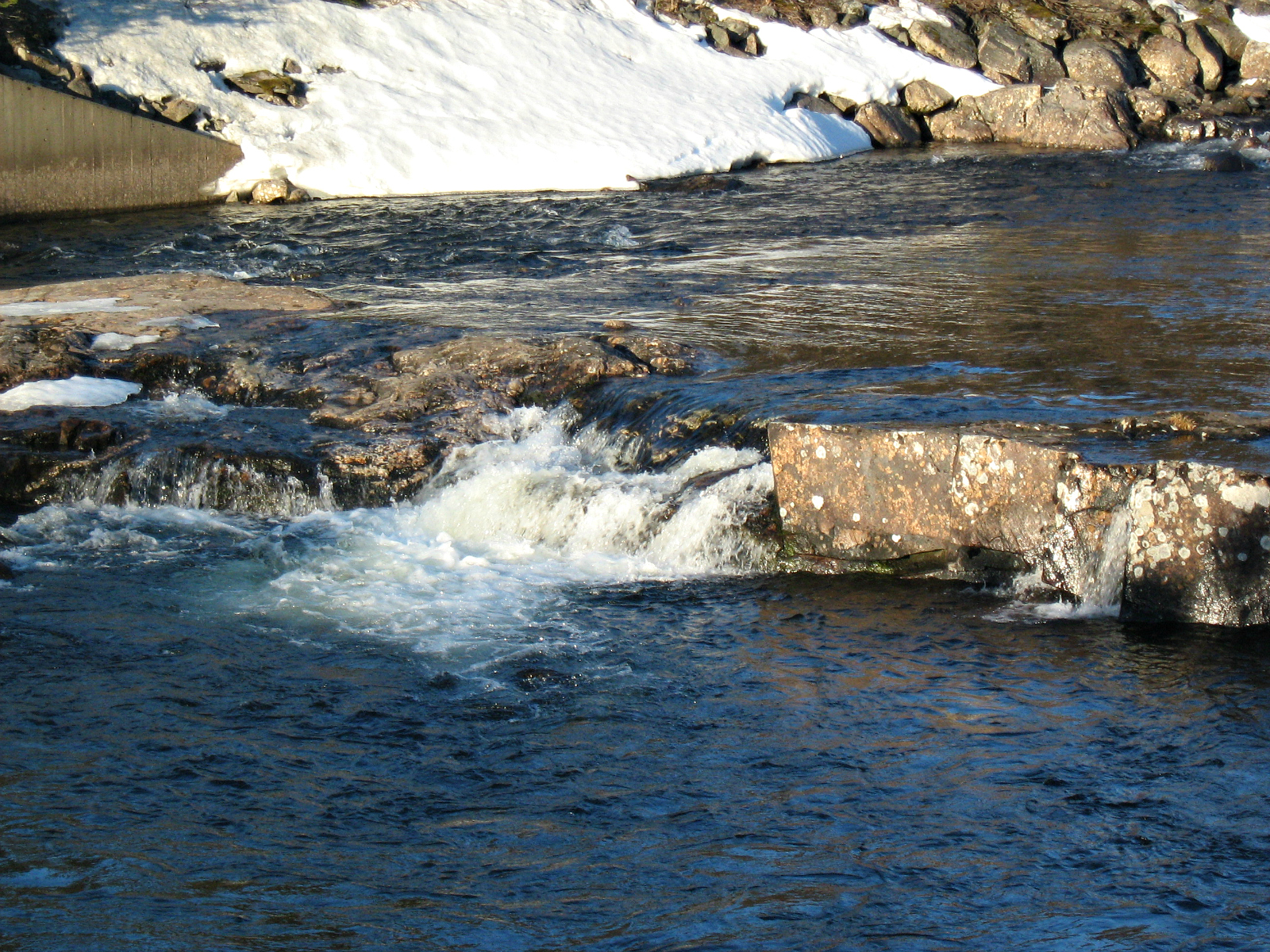
Storåne

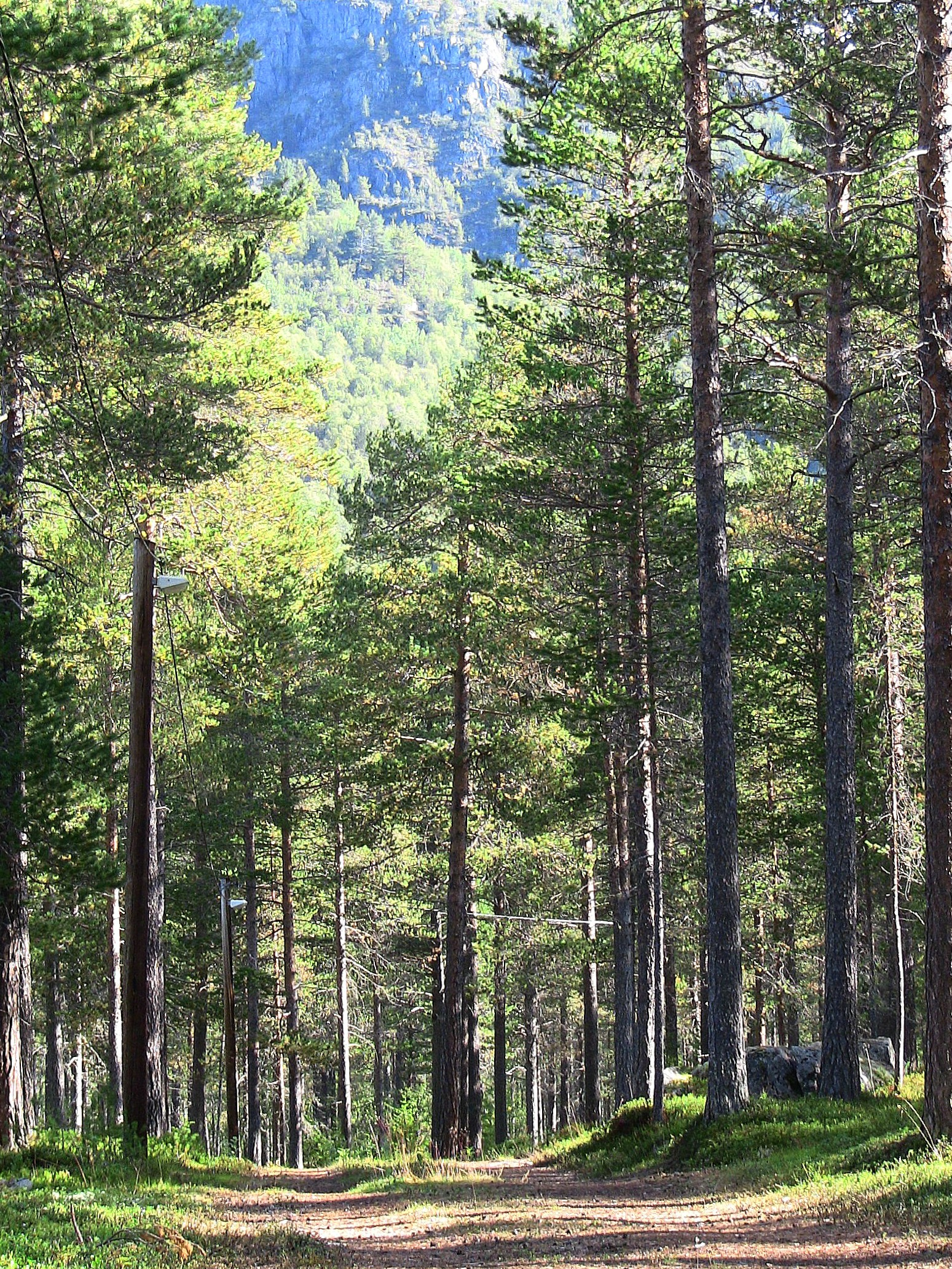
Forest on the banks of the river Storåni, in Hovet, Hol Kommune, Norway, in the morning light of August.

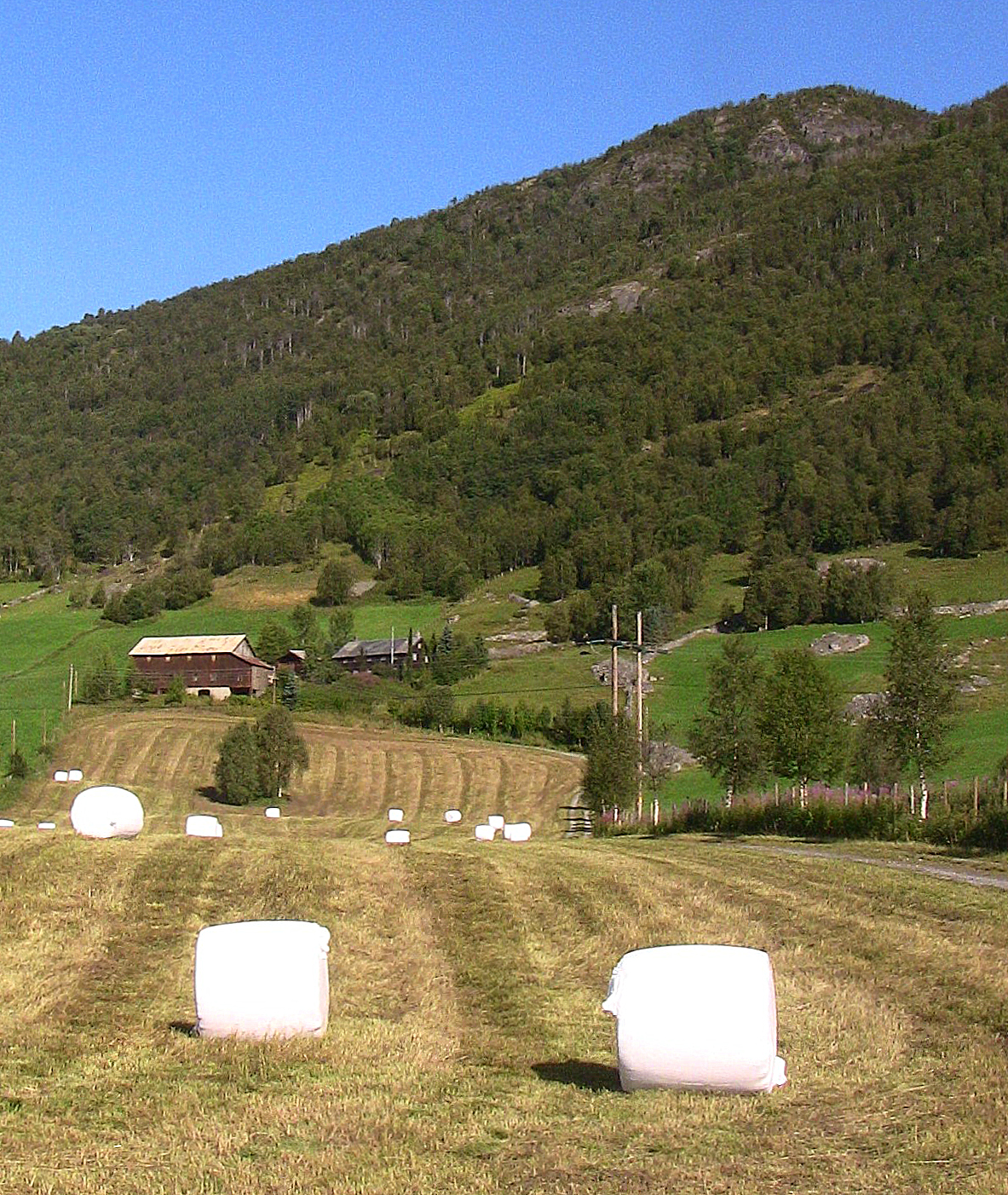
To be able to feed the cattle during the long Norwegian winter the farmers work very hard to cultivate grass, to mow it, several times per summer, and to make these large round bales filled with dried grass, and protected and kept together with plastic. These round bales, in Norwegian "rundballe" are stored outside the farm, organised in rows.

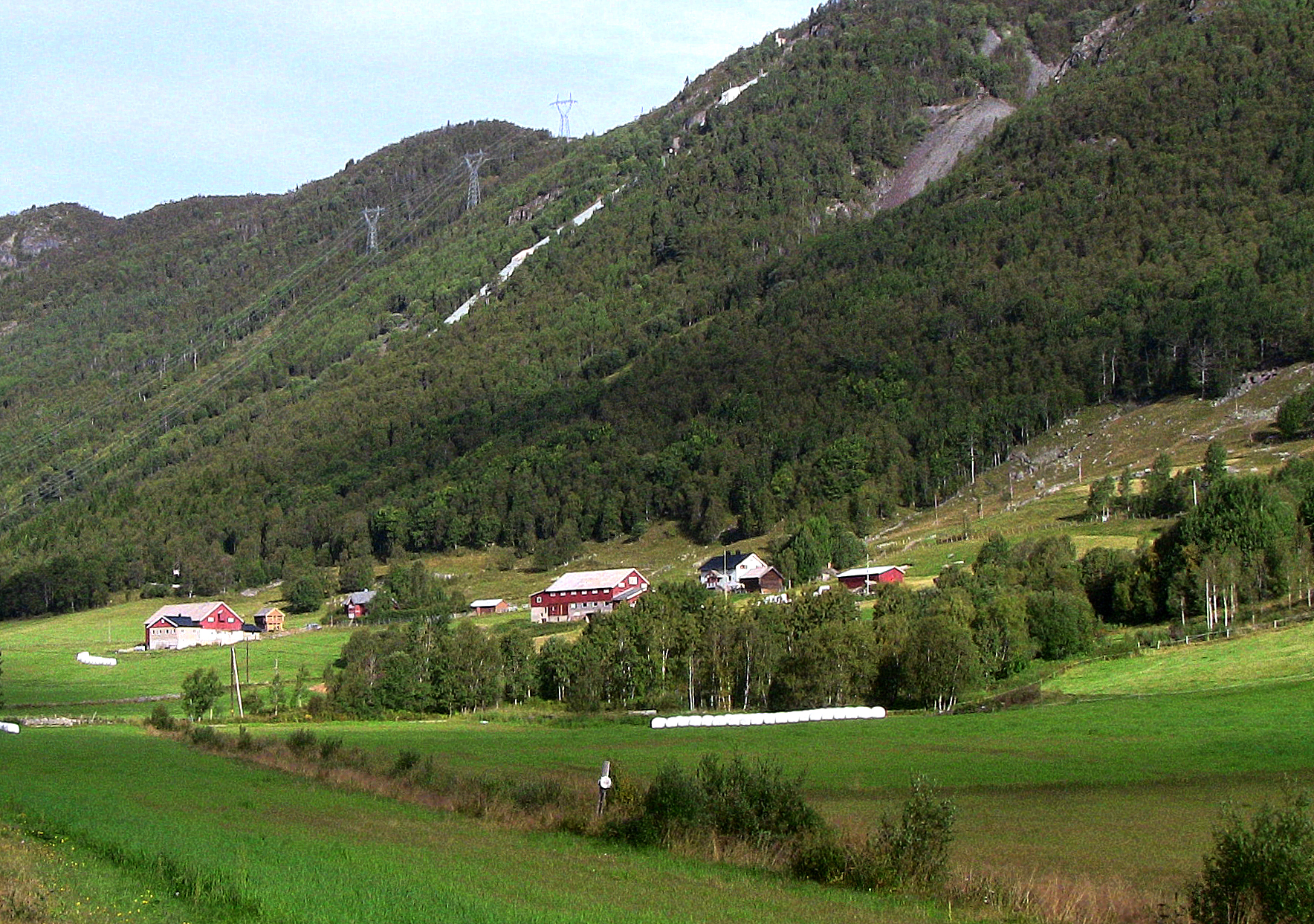
Especially on the more sunny part of Hovet, a village which is situated in a valley, named Hallingdal, farmers have started in the past to build up their farms there, to catch the rays of sun as soon as possible after the sun has disappeared behind the mountains at the end of November, to come back at the end of January. Also for the cattle this sunlight is very important. The cattle one can find here are cows, sheep, goats and horses.

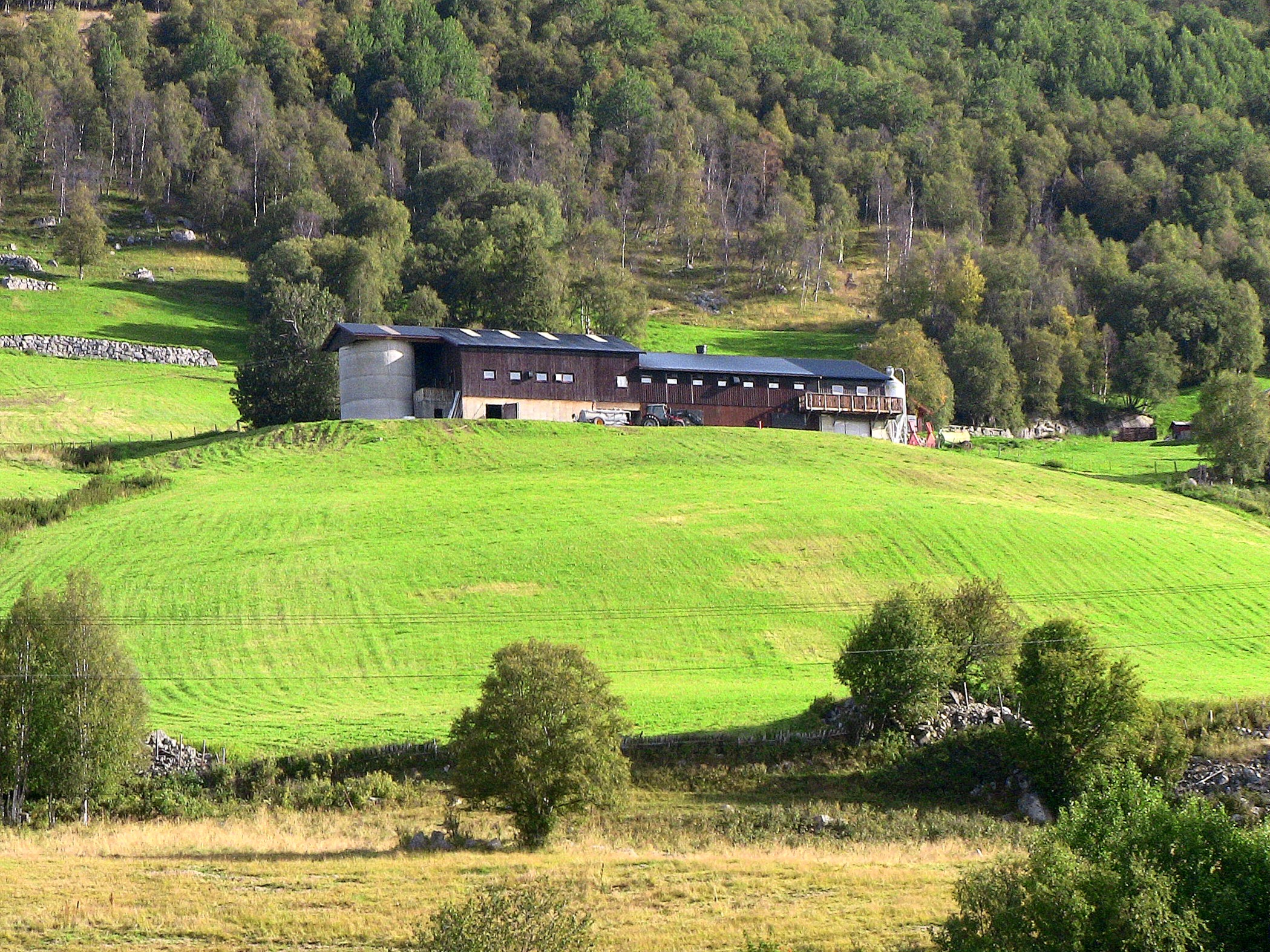
The traditional district of Hallingdal has a richness of traditionally built old farms, that are mostly still in use. These wooden farms and barns create an excellent ecological environment, in a natural landscape.

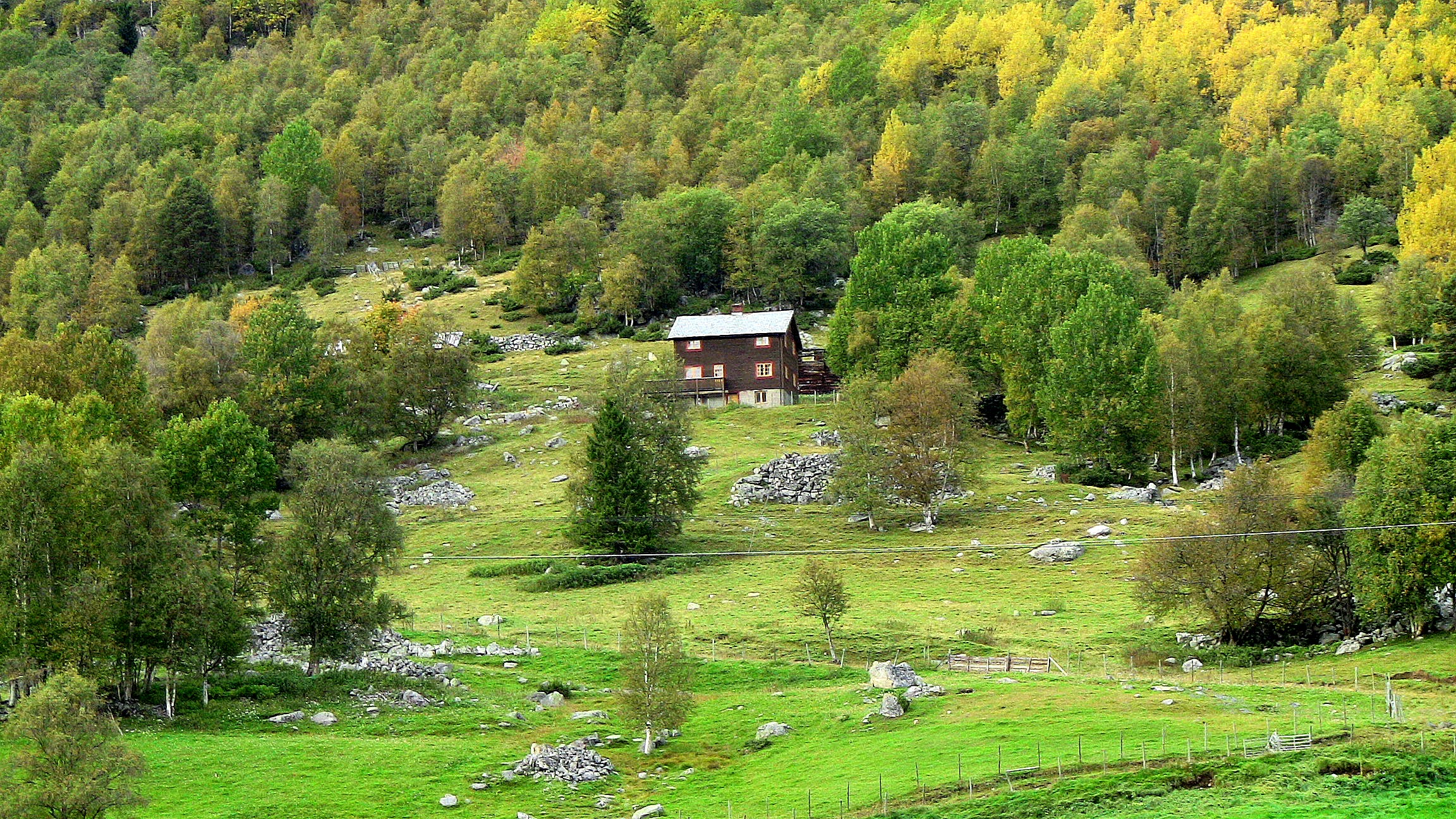
Pål Olson Grøt lived here. Pål Olson Grøt was a Norwegian Rosemåling painter who belonged to the most important Rosemåling painters in Hol, where he was born in 1813, and lived until he moved to the village of Hovet, in 1852, where he died in 1906.

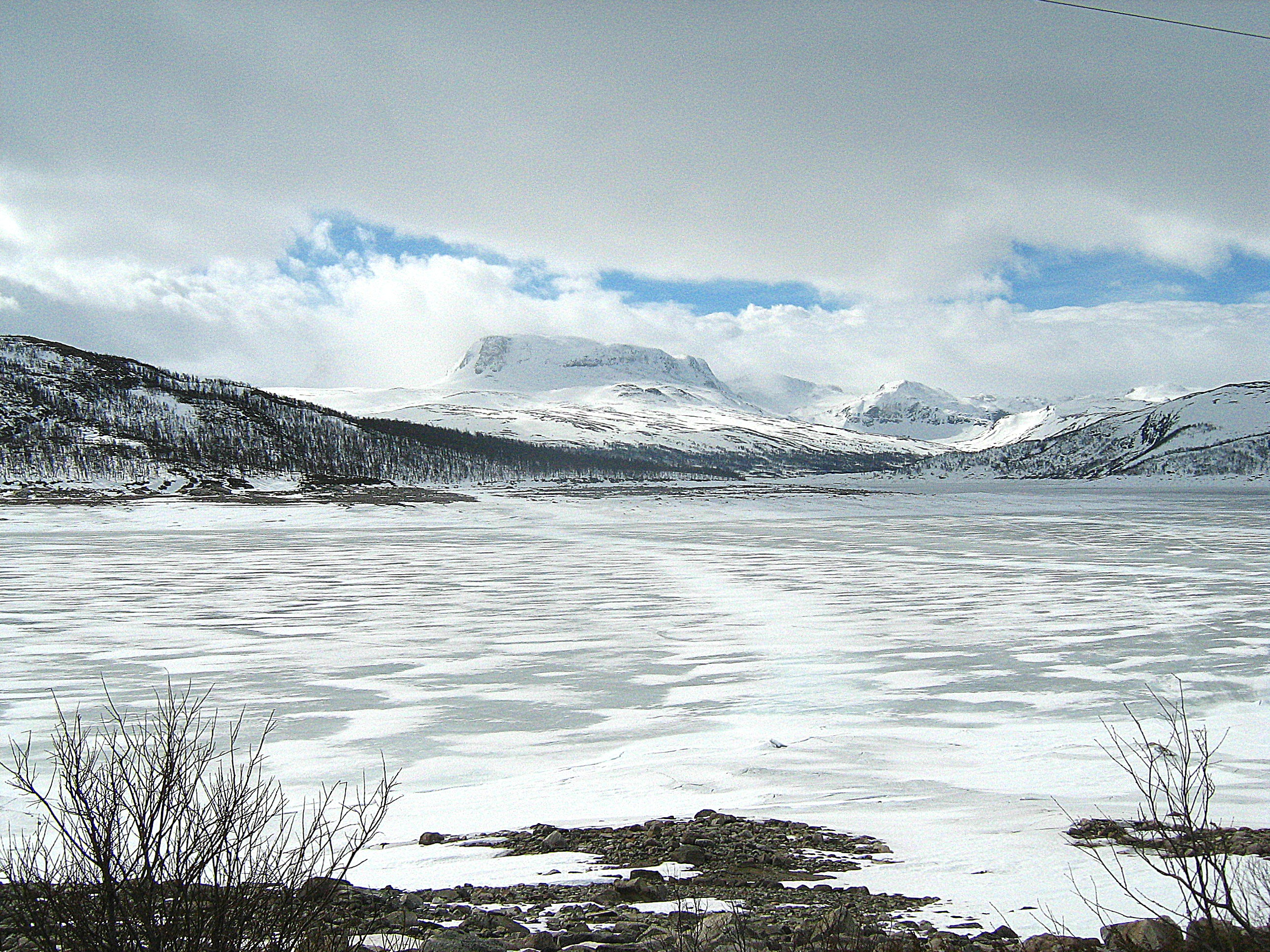
Strandavatnet is an artificial lake, used by ECO-energy Oslo for hydropower. The mountains on the other side belong to national park Hallingskarvet.
