= Stolsvatnet =

Lake in Norway

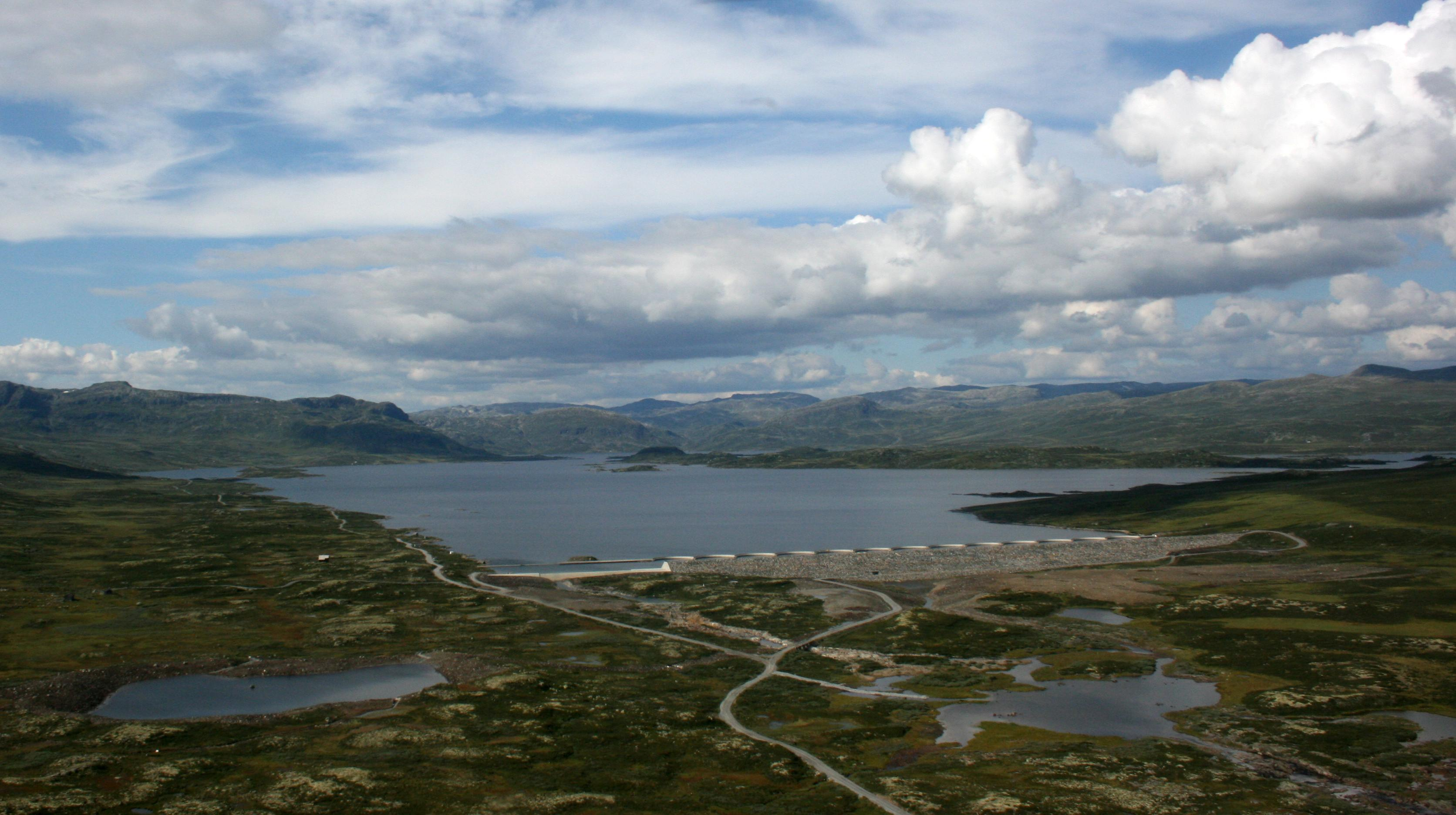

- Location within Buskerud Location within Norway
- Location: Ål, Hol (Buskerud)
- Coordinates: 60°45′9″N 8°5′53″E
- Basin countries: Norway
- Surface area: 34.86 km^{2} (13.46 sq mi)
- Shore length^{1}: 124.61 km (77.43 mi)
- Surface elevation: 1,090 m (3,580 ft)
- References: NVE
- ^{1} Shore length is not a well-defined measure.

Stolsvatnet is a regulated lake in the municipalities of Ål and Hol in Buskerud, Norway. Stolsvatnet was formed in the late 1940s by the damming of the upper parts of three rivers, (Stolsvatn, Olsendvatn, Holselva) which created a continuous lake across the watersheds. The new lake covered a number of existing smaller lakes. It is a reservoir for Hol I kraftverk, a hydroelectric power plant located off FV 50 by Hovet in Hol. The power plant is owned and operated by E-Co Energi.

== See also ==
- Strandavatnet
