= Knut Bry =

Norwegian photographer

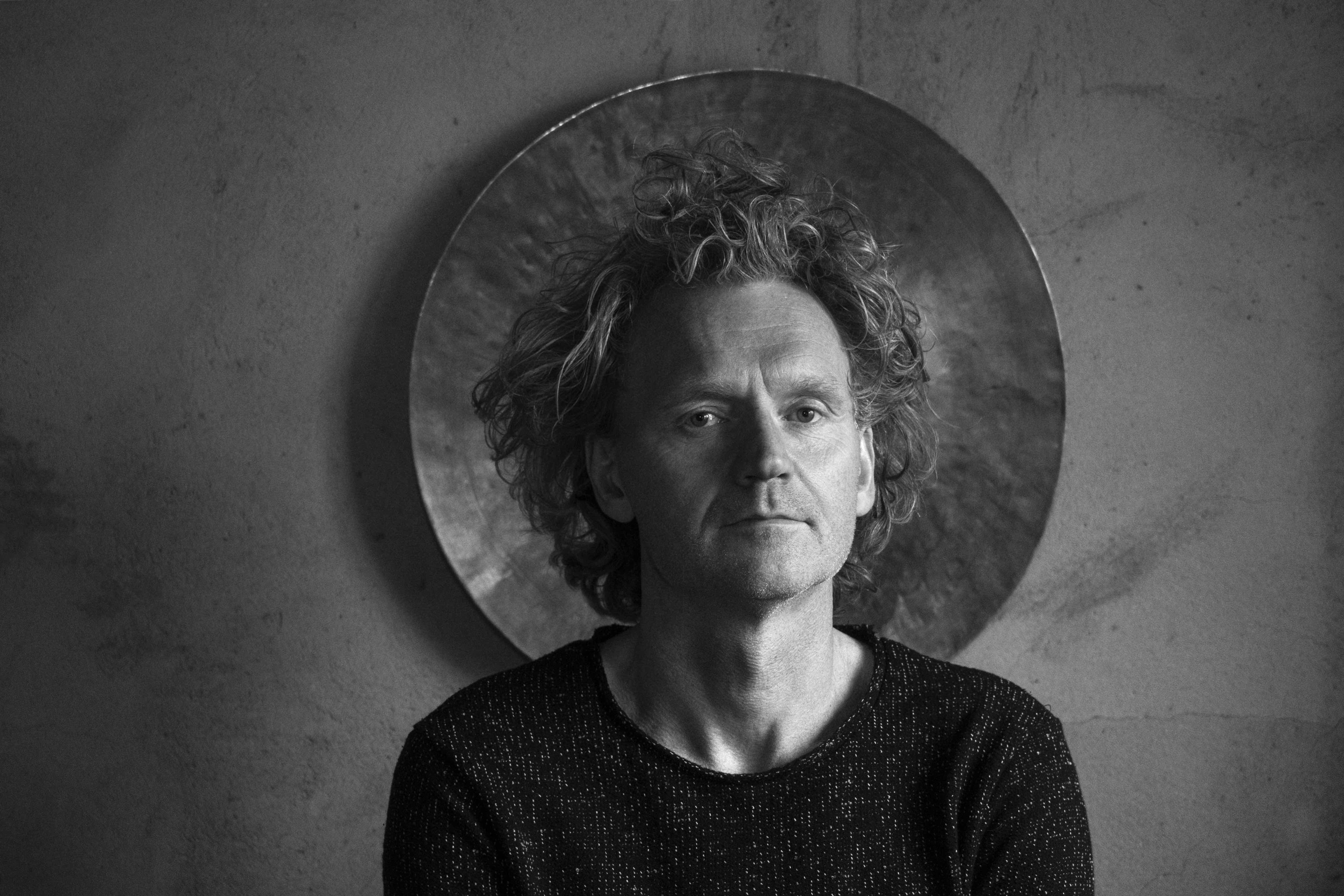
Portrait of Terje Isungset by Knut Bry (2015)

Knut Johannes Bry (born 3 October 1946) is a Norwegian fine-art photographer and film director.

Bry chose photography as a profession in 1975, when he was 29 years old. He has won a number of photographic awards, among them Photographer of the Year in the United States in 1986 and in Norway in 1989. He has permanent exhibits at the Henie-Onstad Art Centre, the Preus Museum, and Nord Norske Kunstsamlinger. His work has also been exhibited at Espace Canon in Paris, in Norilsk, and various museums in Norway. He has published and contributed to several books within photography, fashion, and food.

He was born in Hovet, Buskerud, Norway.
