= Hivjufossen =

Waterfall in Buskerud, Norway

- Interactive map of Hivjufossen
- Location: Buskerud, Norway
- Coordinates: 60.61079°N 8.07368°E
- Elevation: 250 metres (820 ft)
- Watercourse: Storekvelvi river

Hivjufossen is a 250-metre (820 ft) tall waterfall located west of the village of Hovet in Hol Municipality in Buskerud county, Norway.

Located about 5 kilometres (3.1 mi) from the centre of the village Hovet (towards Aurland Municipality), there is a hiking path that leads to the Hivjufossen waterfall, which is a local tourist attraction. The waterfall can only be reached after by a 40-60 minute climb. Hivjufossen consists of an upper and lower waterfall which are created by the water of the river Storekvelvi that streams from Hardangervidda National Park to Hallingskarvet National Park. It is joined by other rivers and streams as it flows in the direction of the river Storåne in Hovet.

== Deadly accidents ==
Magne Holestøl, a local experienced travel guide of tourists who visit the Hivjufossen and member of the rescue team in 1991, stated in the article "Ikke trygt for turister" in the local newspaper NRK Buskerud: Hivjufossen is not safe for tourists.

- 1991: a 44-year old Norwegian woman died by falling
- 3 August 2007: a 40-year old Dutch man accidentally fell into the waterfall and was found dead some hours later.
- 24 July 2016: a 52-year old American died from a fall

== Gallery ==
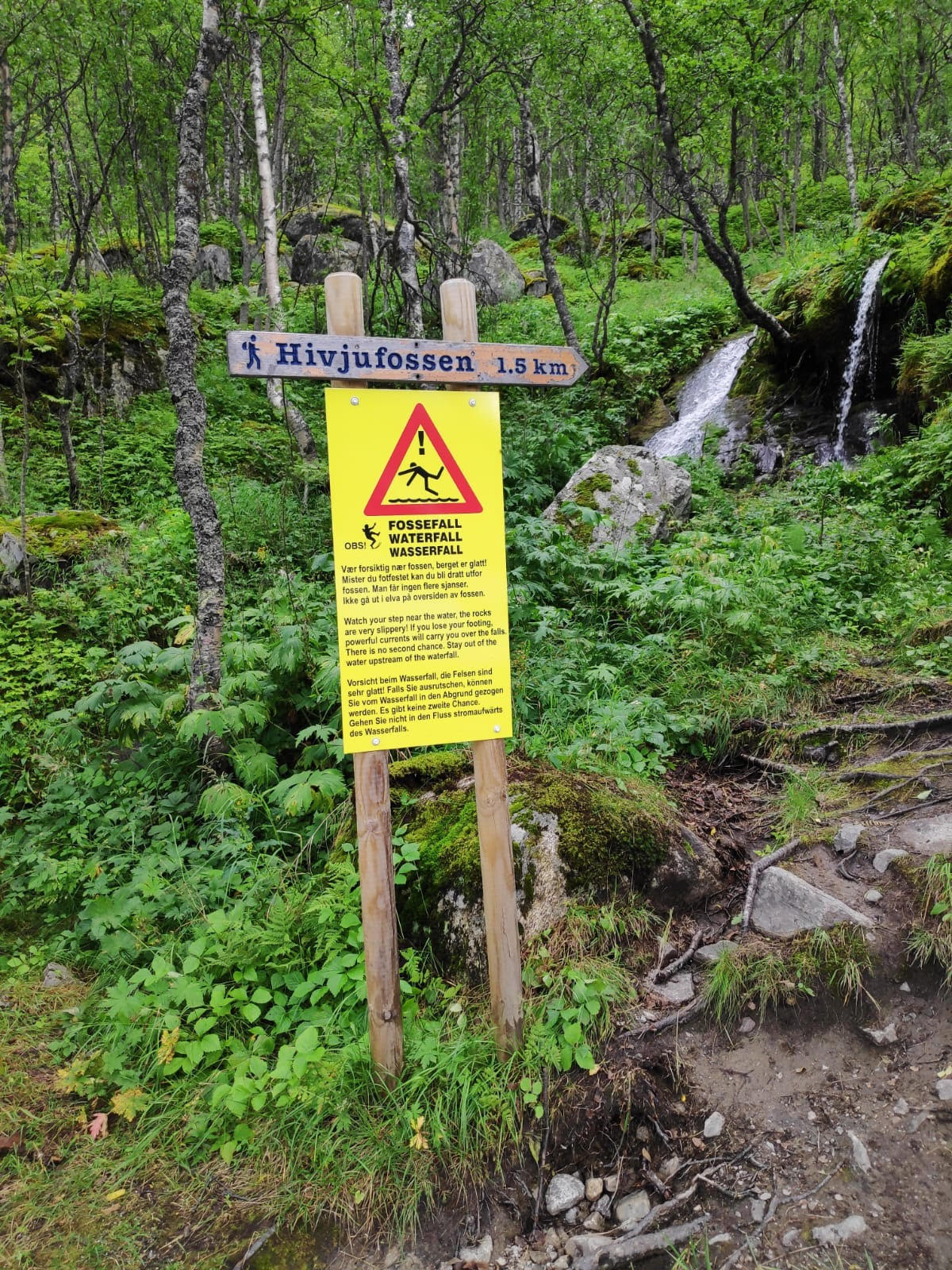
Hivjufossen, warning sign

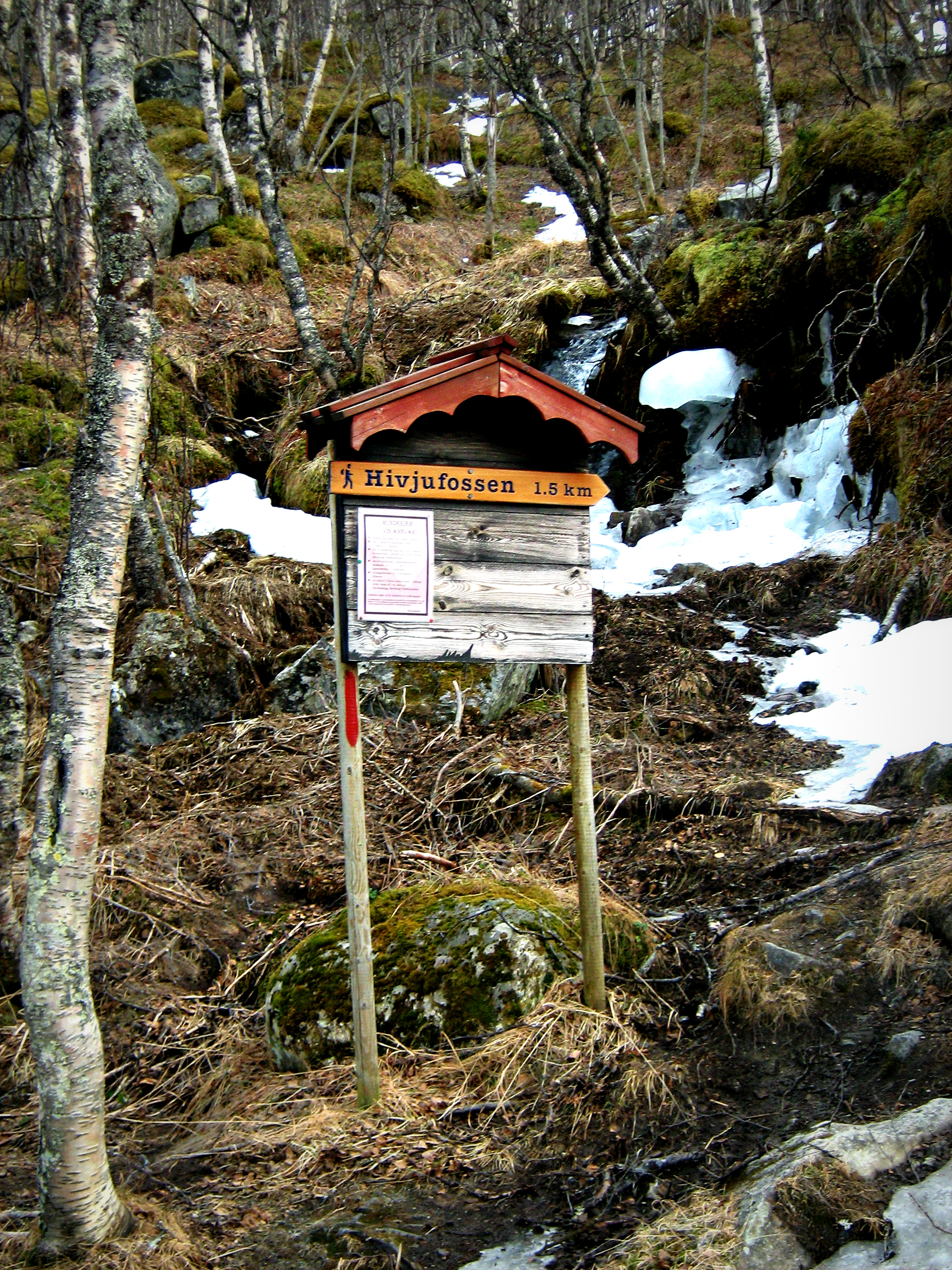
The former entrance sign.

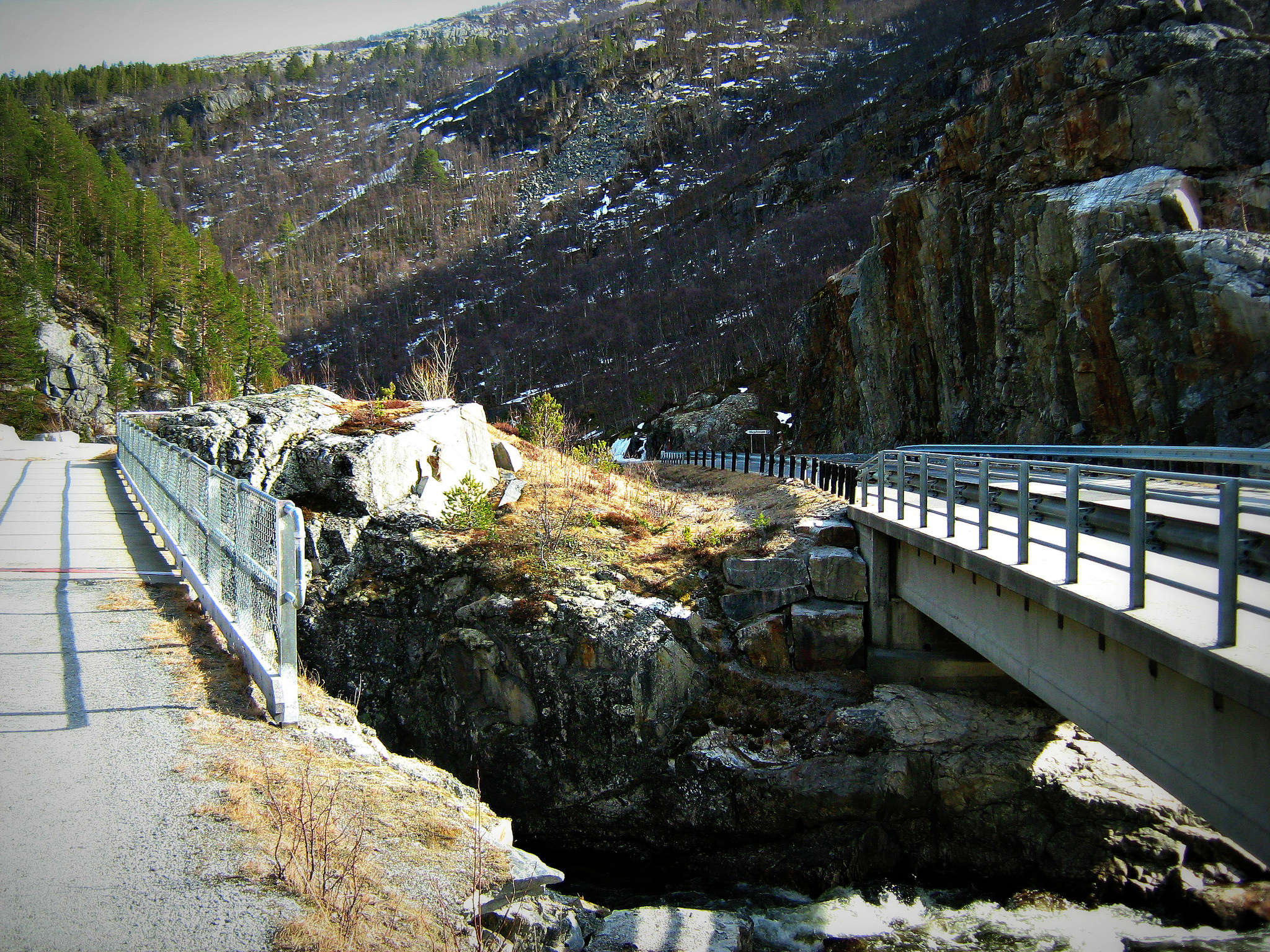
Bridge over the river Storåni

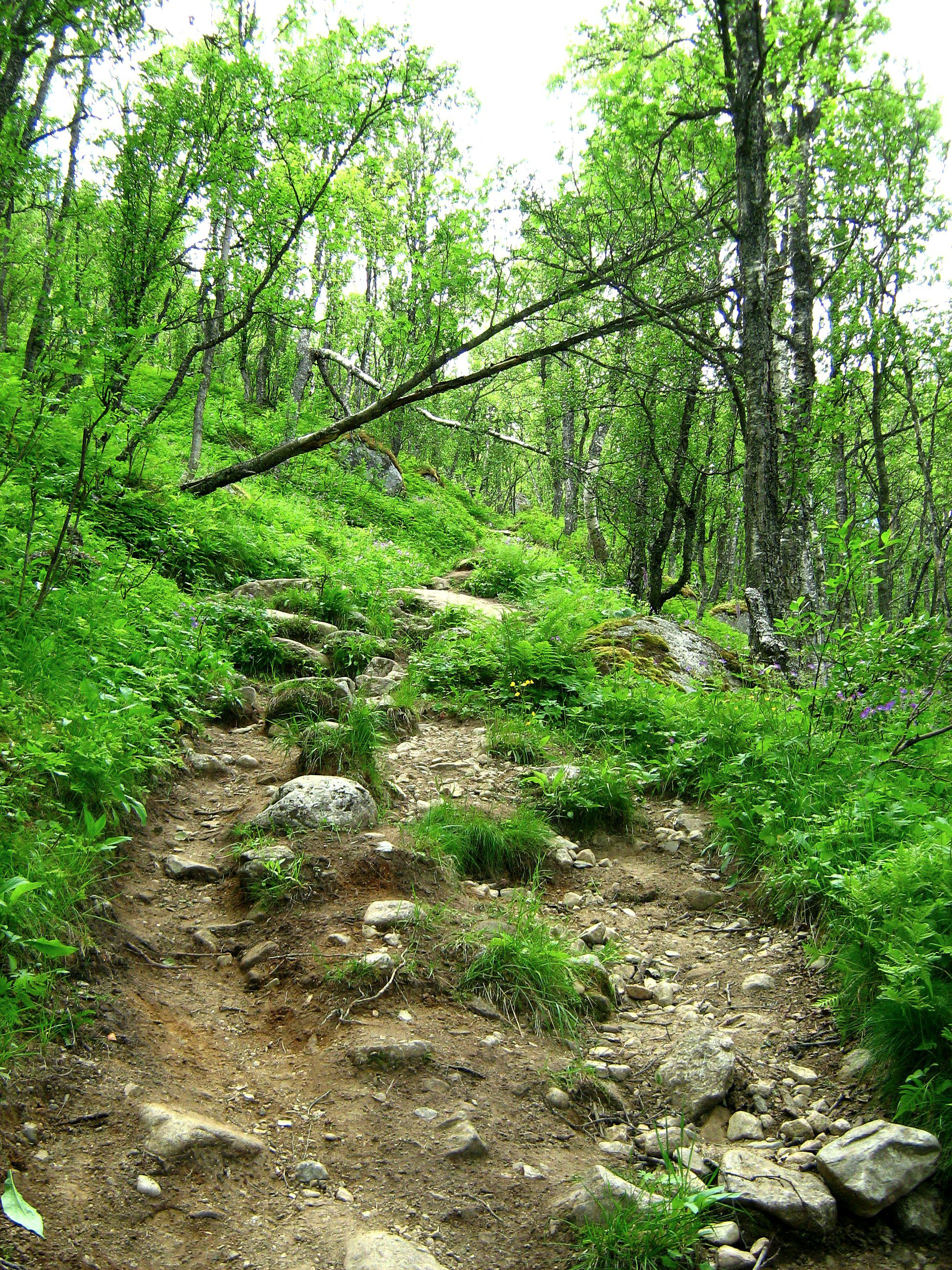
Part of the track

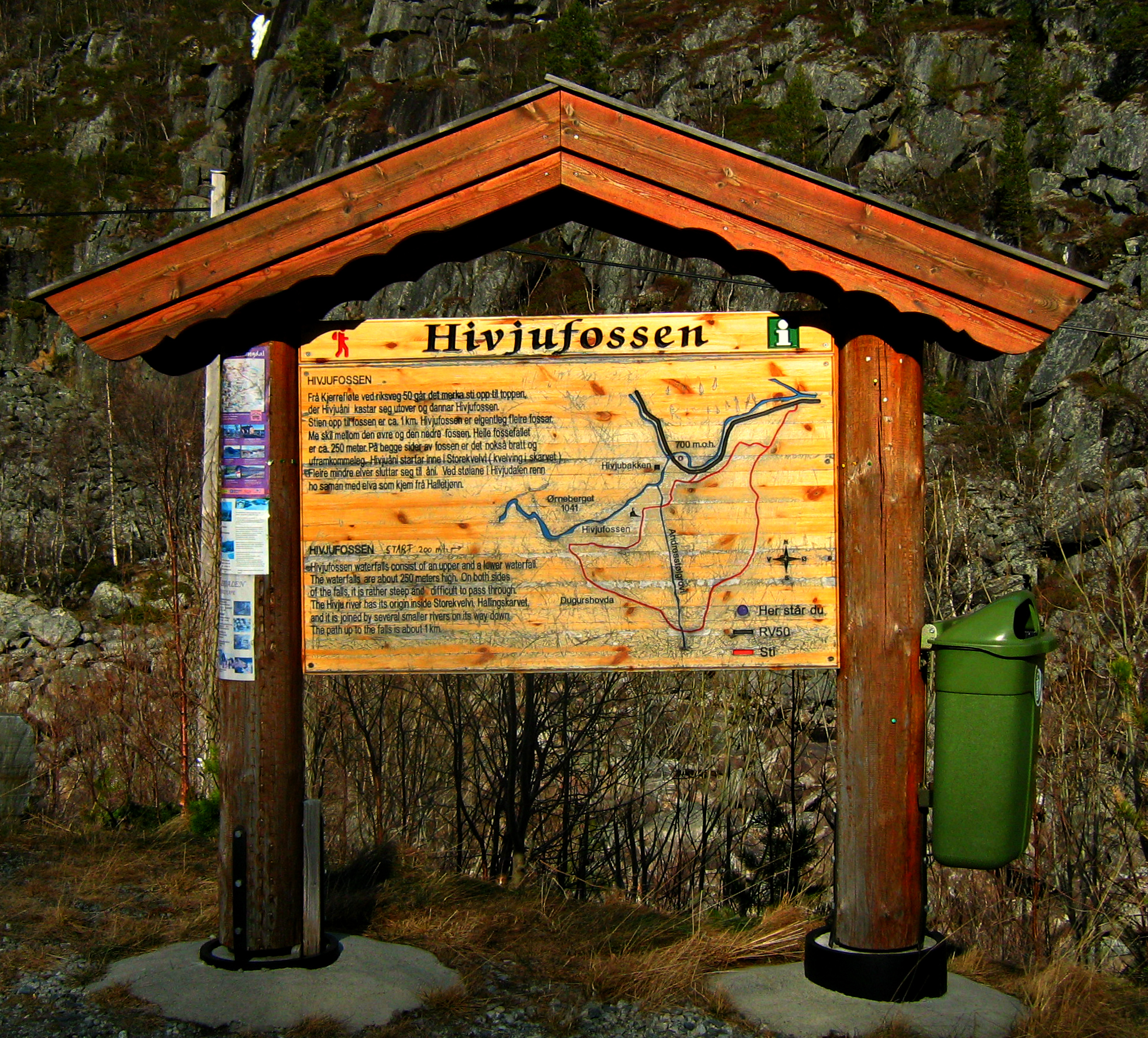
Information board near to the Hivjufossen waterfall

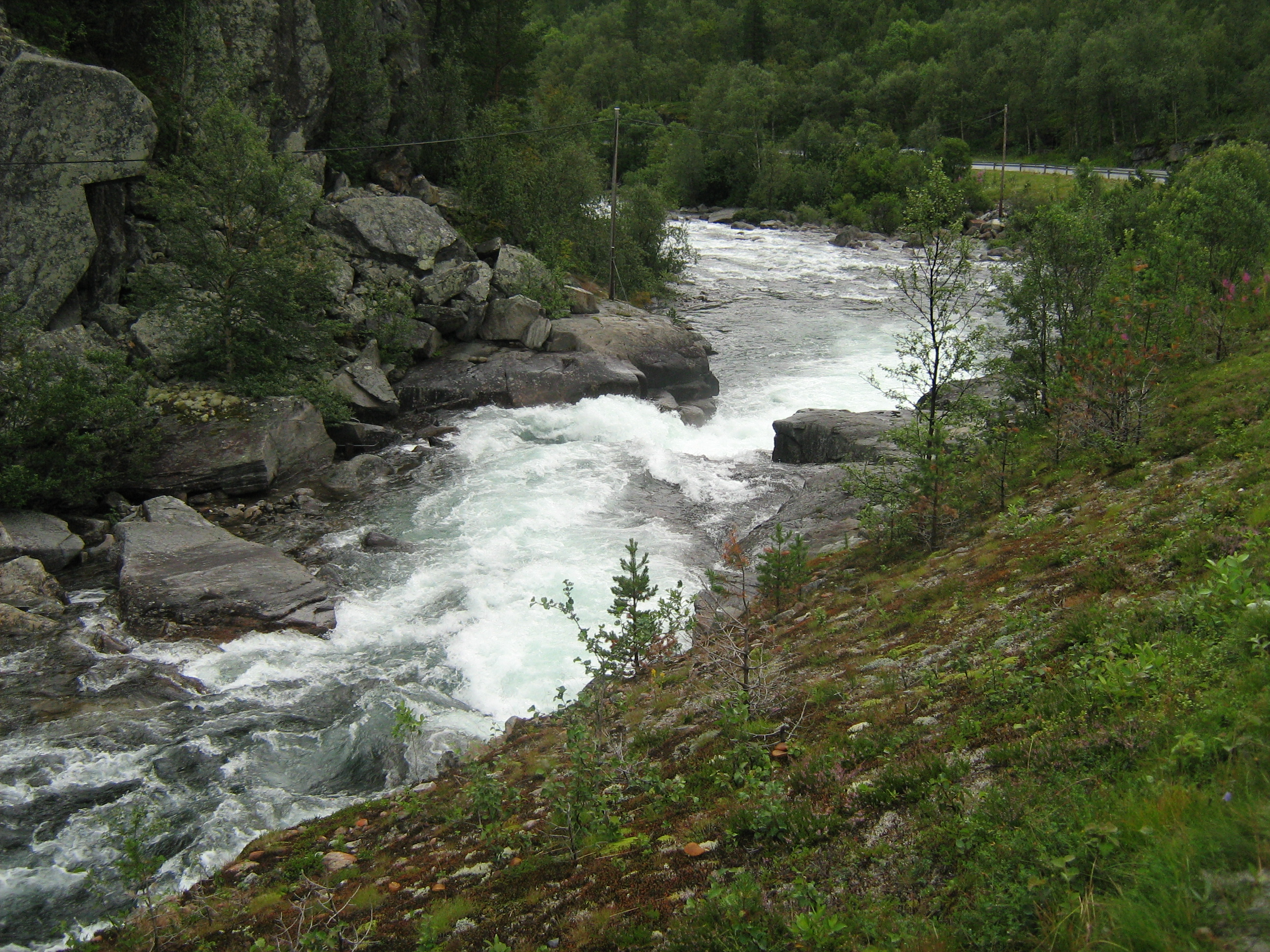
Where the Hivjufossen becomes the river Storåni

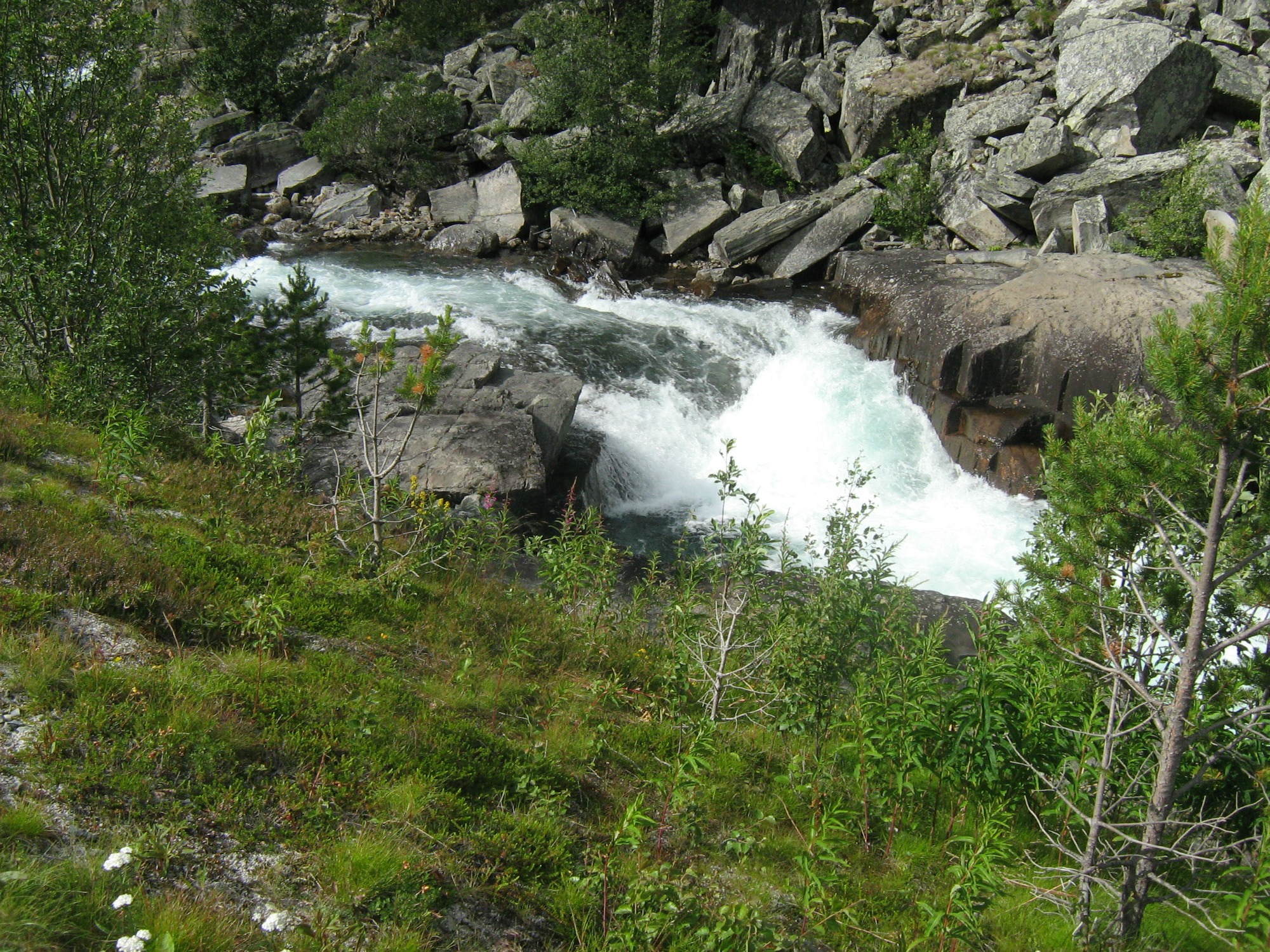
Storåni river

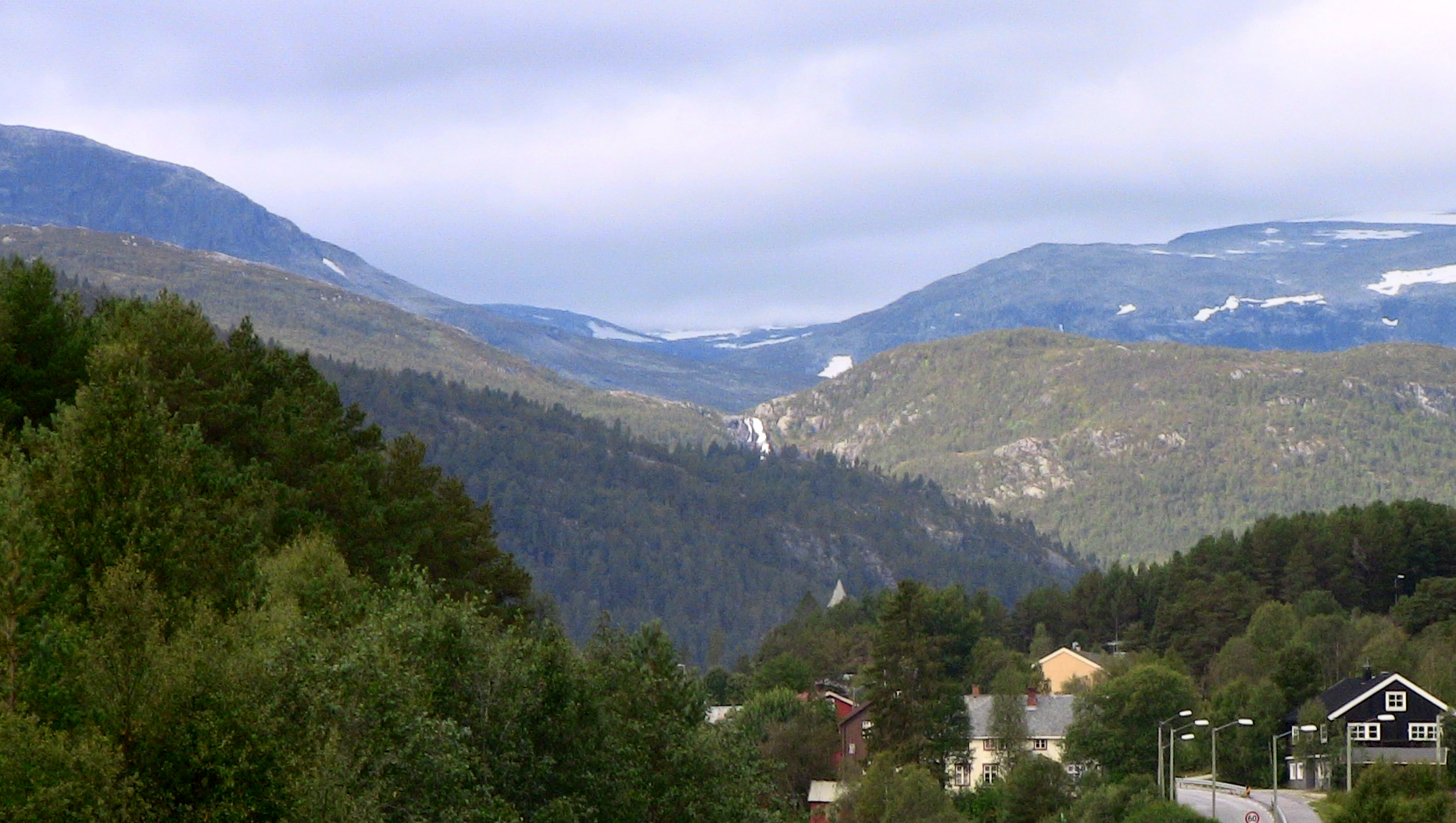
Hovet, in the province Viken. The Hivjufossen is visible in the central point of the picture.

== See also ==
- List of waterfalls

== Literature ==
- Ciska Zeypveld (2013) De dag dat je uit mijn leven viel (The day you fell out of my life") Publisher: Utrecht: Voorhoeve ISBN 978 90 2972 138 7
