= Strandavatnet =

Lake in Hol, Buskerud, Norway

Coordinates: 60°40′19.81″N 7°51′31.17″E

Strandavatnet is a lake in Hol municipality, Norway. The lake covers an area of 23.75 square kilometres (9.17 sq mi), and lies 975 metres (3,199 ft) above sea level.' The lake is a reservoir for the Rud hydroelectric powerstation in Hovet, Buskerud. In 1952/1953 a dam was constructed which lifted the lake level 28 meters, thus the lake varies between 950 and 978 m above sea level.

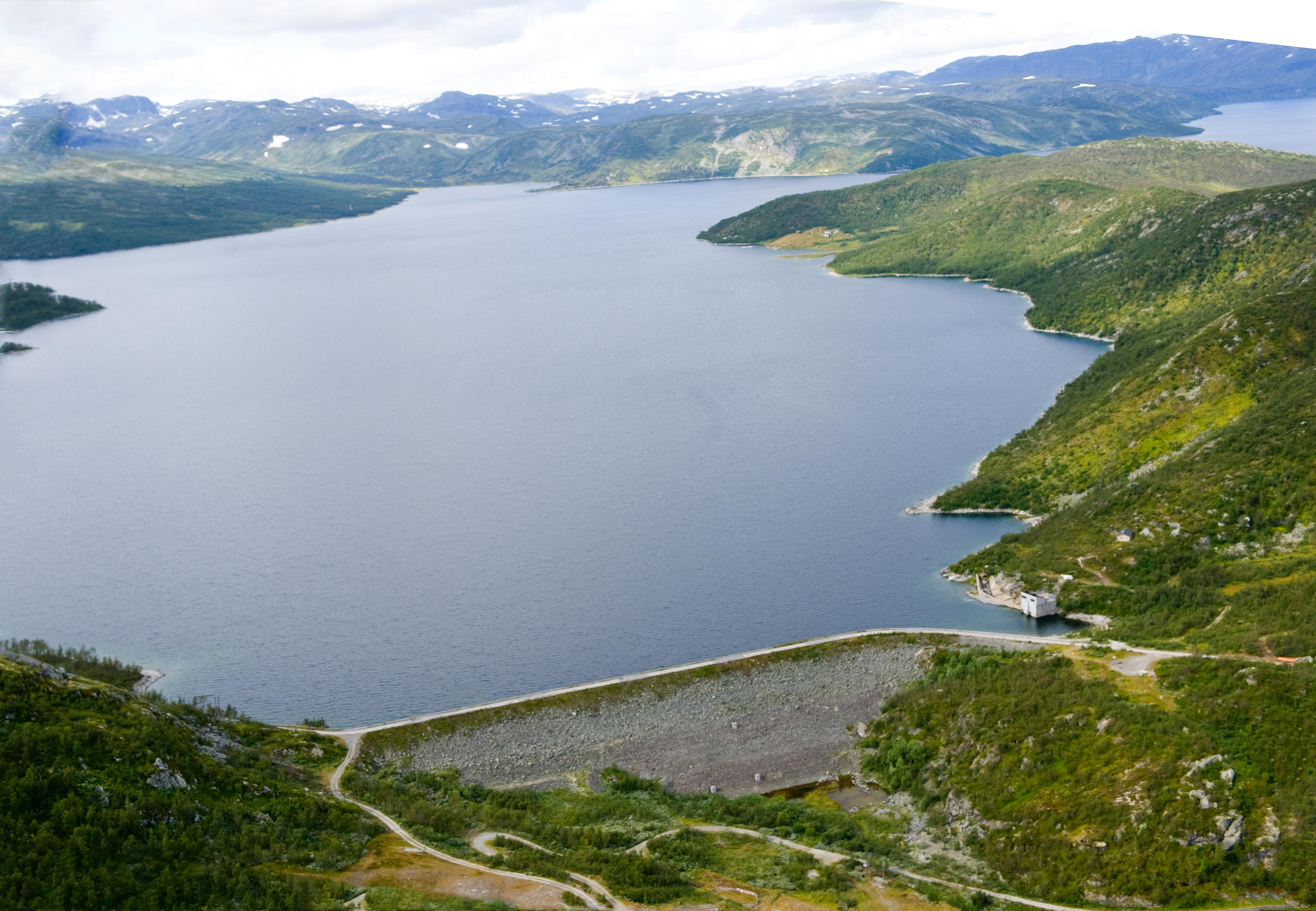
Strandavatnet, Hovet, Hol Kommune.

== First rock filling dam in Norway ==
The dam in the Strandavatnet was the first rock filling (embankment) dam in Norway. You can see the dam on your left hand side from FV 50 at Myrland (the road to Raggsteindalen goes over the dam). The Hol 1 power station, in Hovet, Buskerud utilizes water from two watercourses, Urunda, where Strandavatnet, is the intake reservoir, and Votna where Varaldset is the intake reservoir. Stolsvatnet is the biggest and highest reservoir in the Votna watercourse. See figure below.

== Overview of two watercourses ==
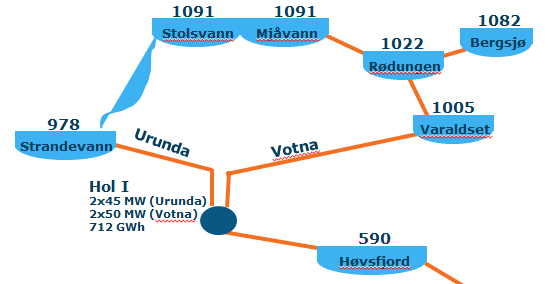

== Photos ==
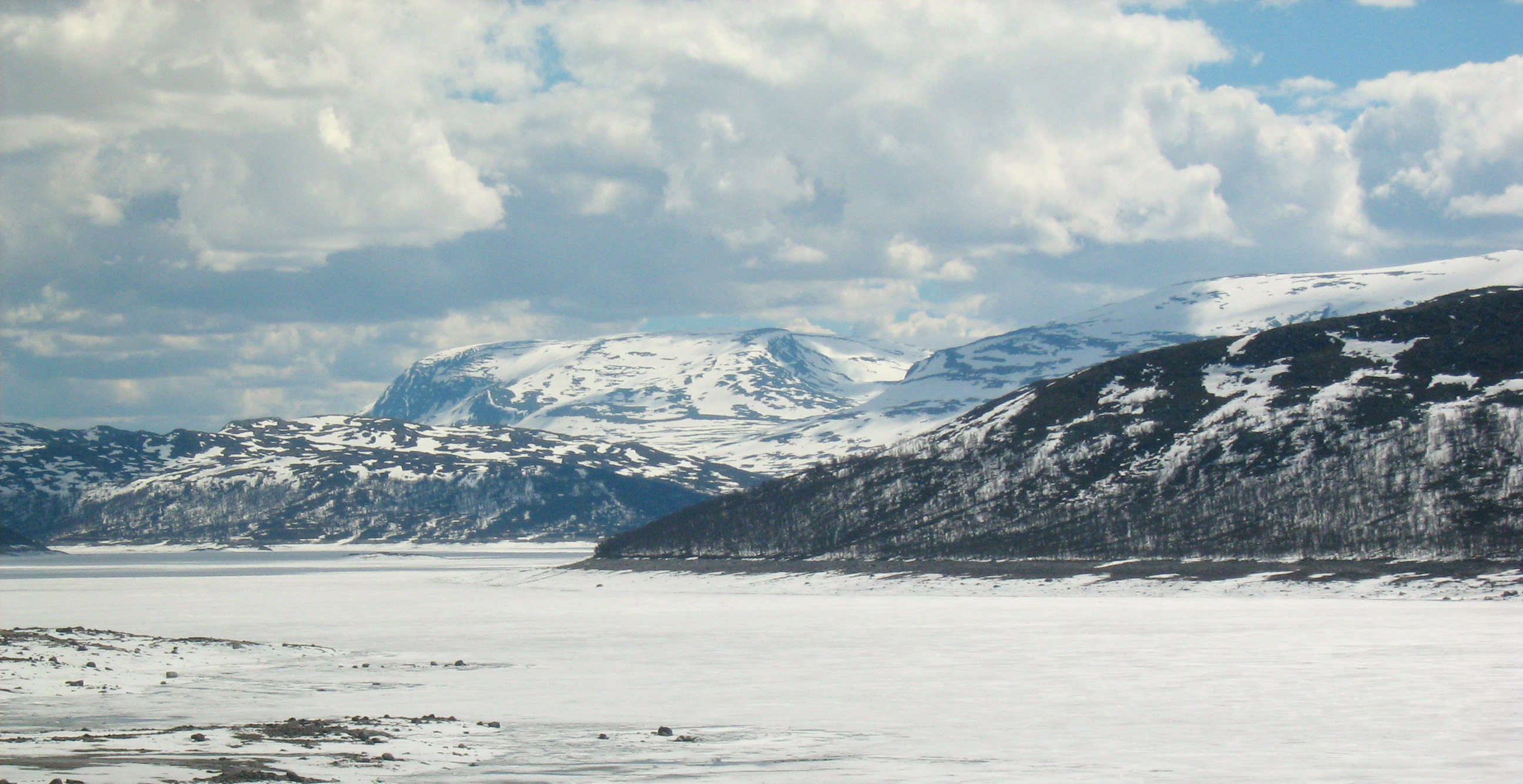
A frozen Strandavatnet

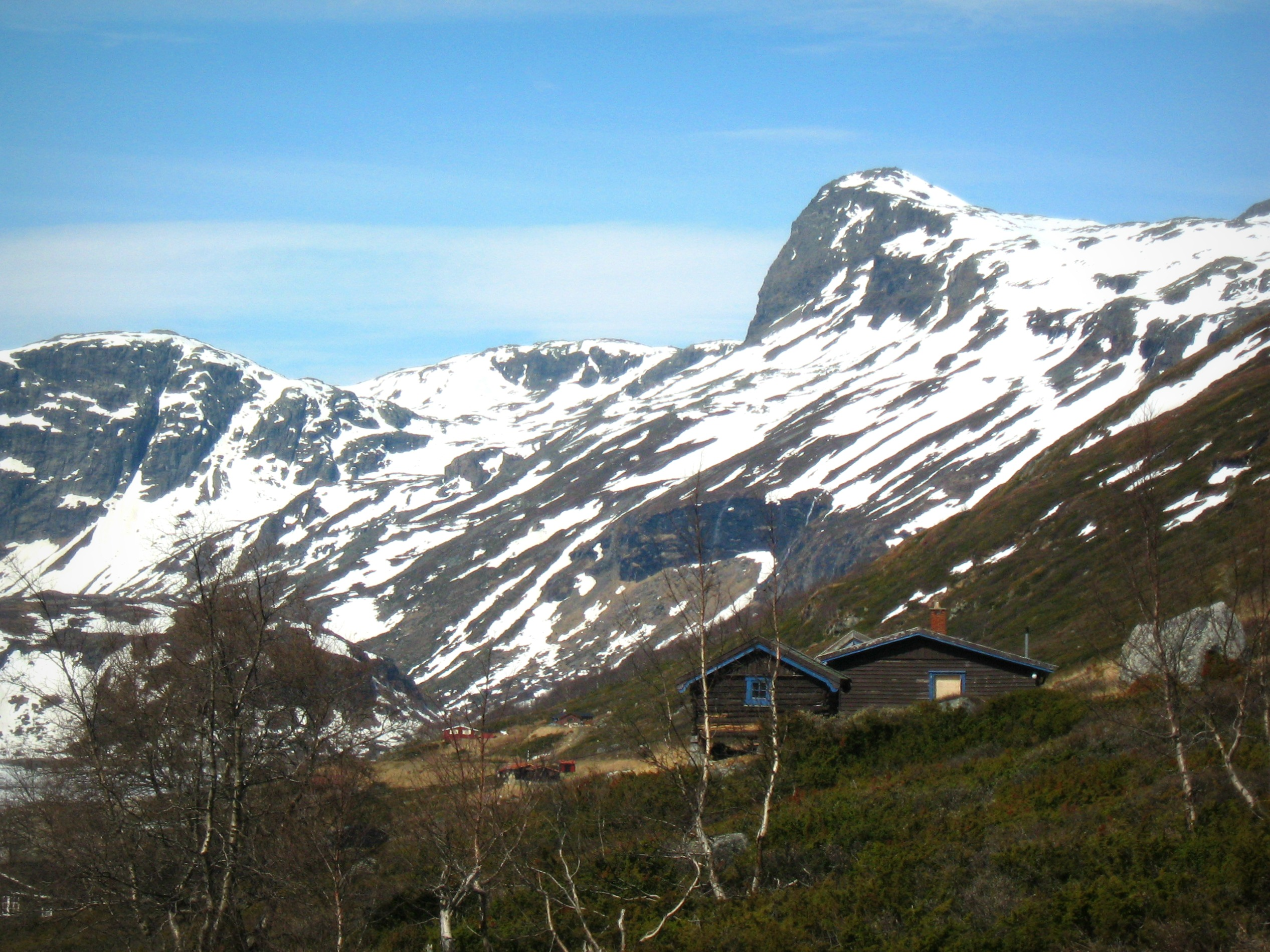
Surroundings Strandavatnet

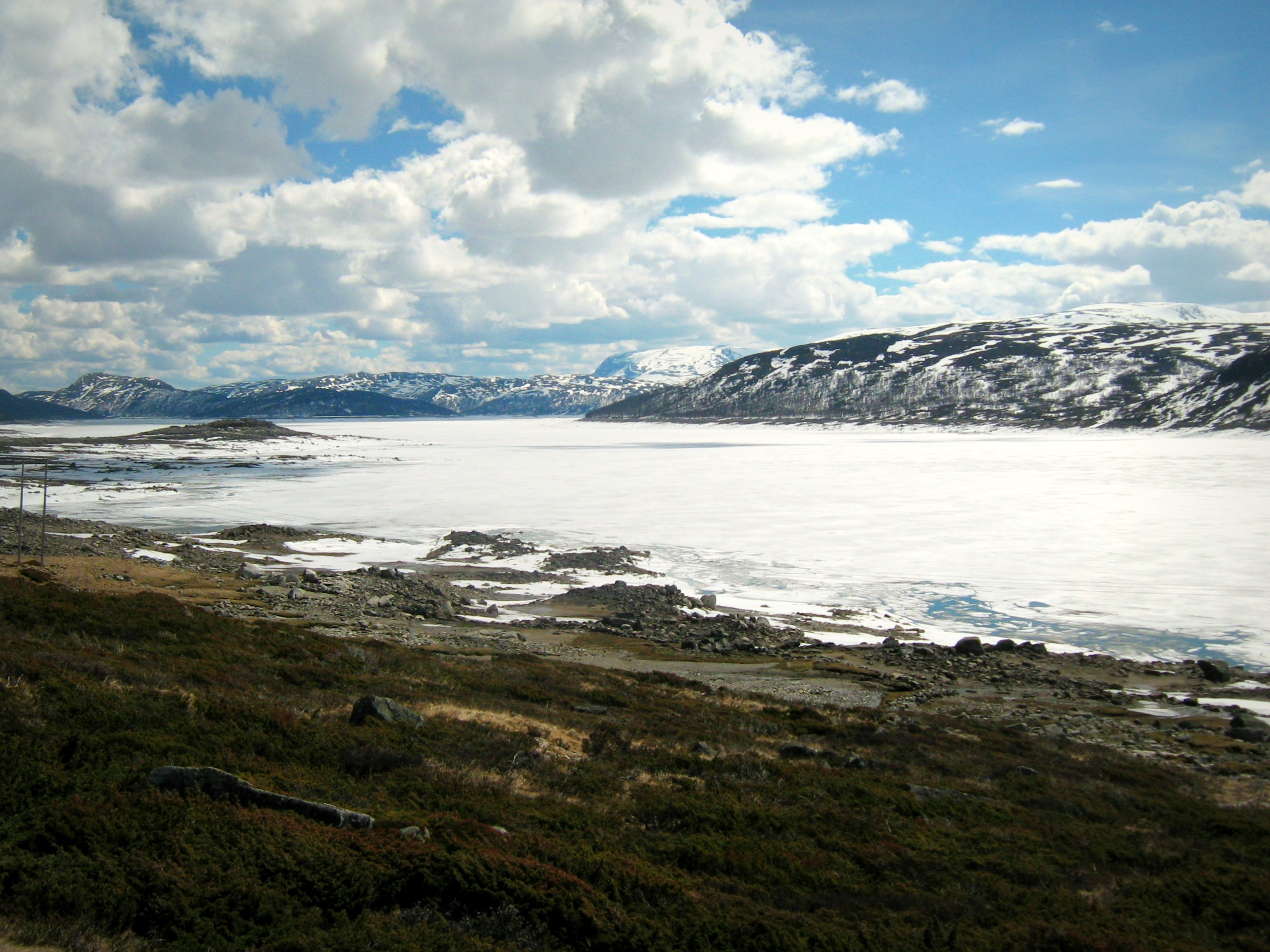
View on Hallingskarvet National Park

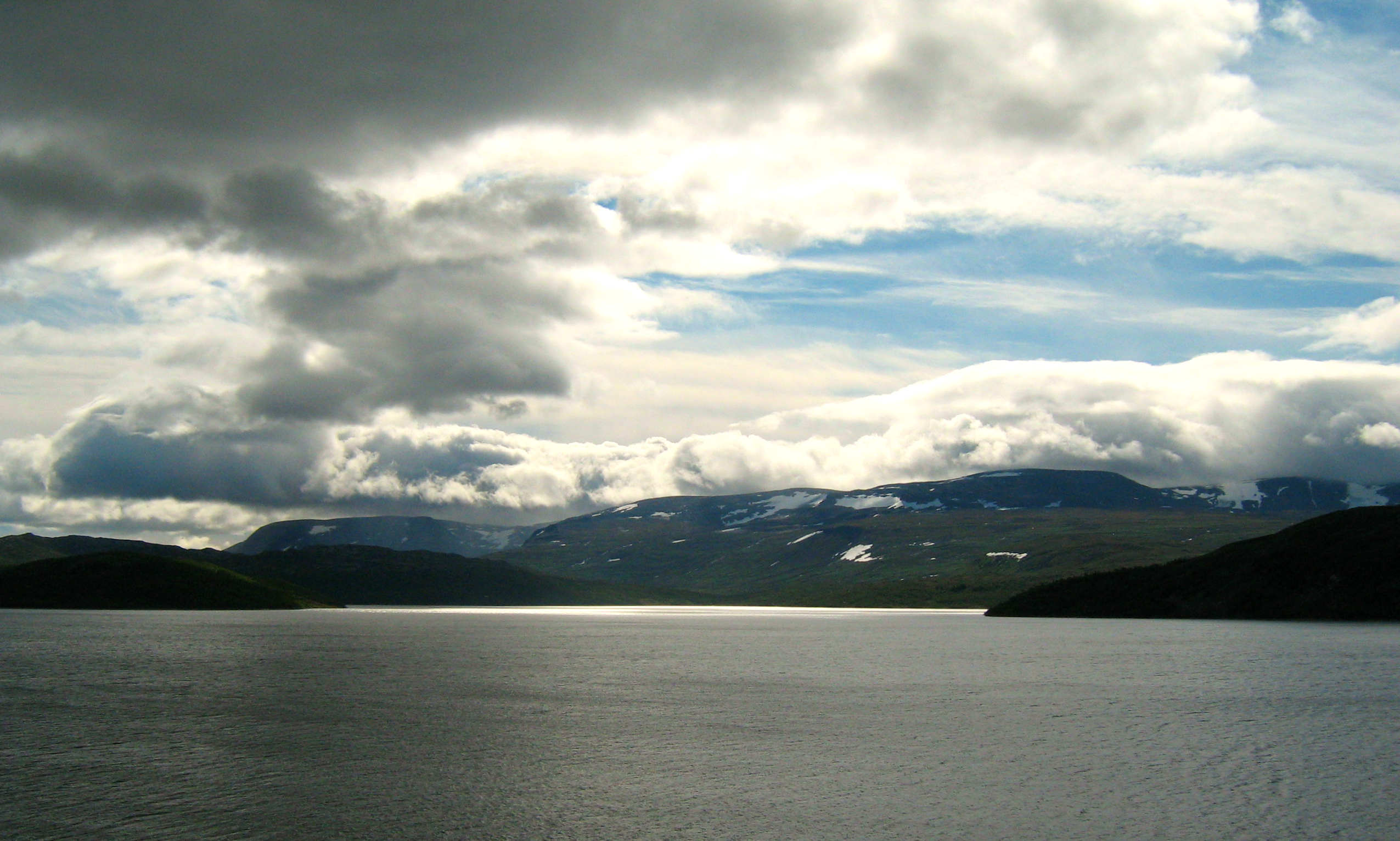
Strandavatnet

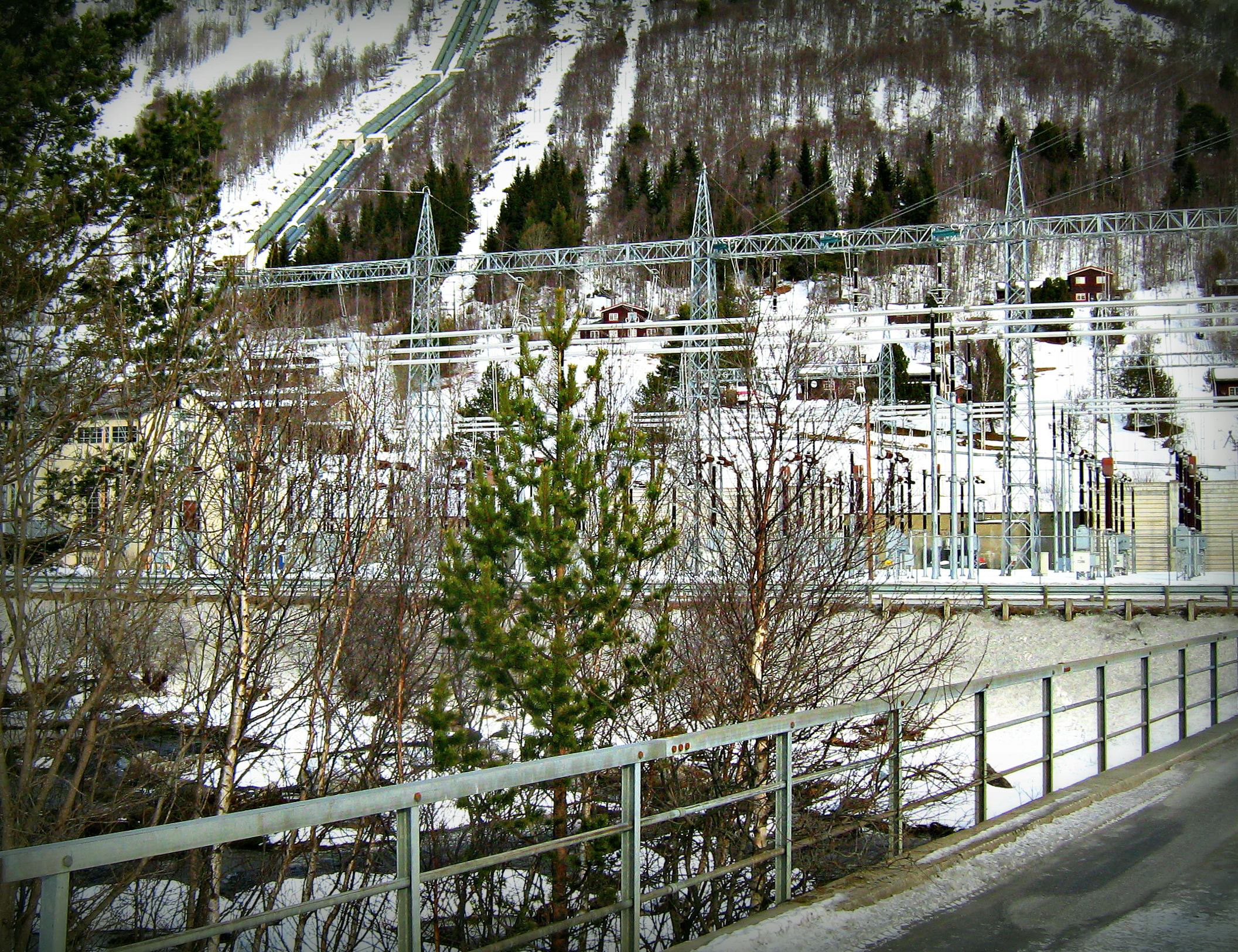
Powerstation, Hovet

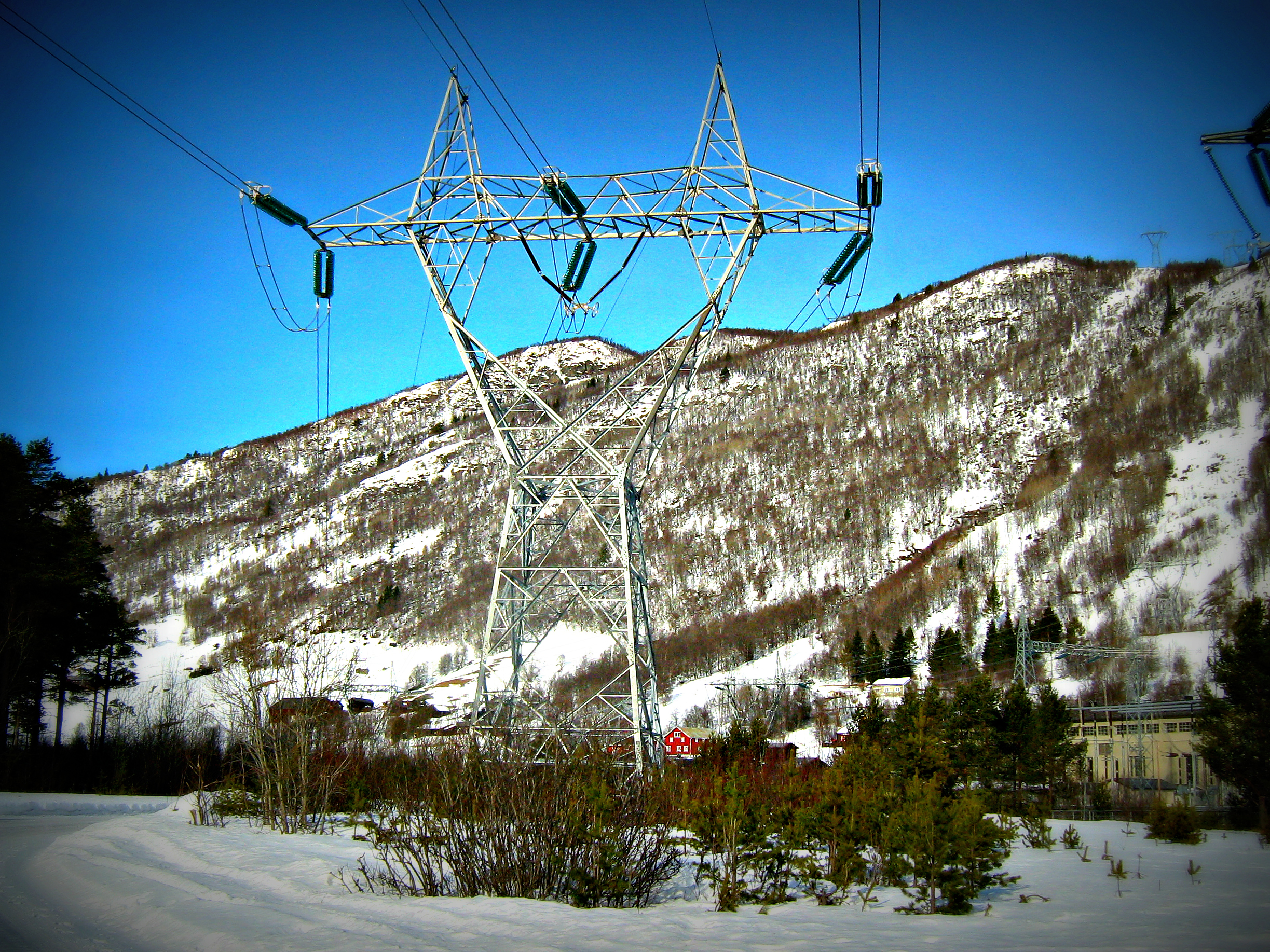
Green energy to Oslo

== Sources ==
- E-Co Energi
