= Dagali Church =

Church in Buskerud, Norway

- Dagali kirke
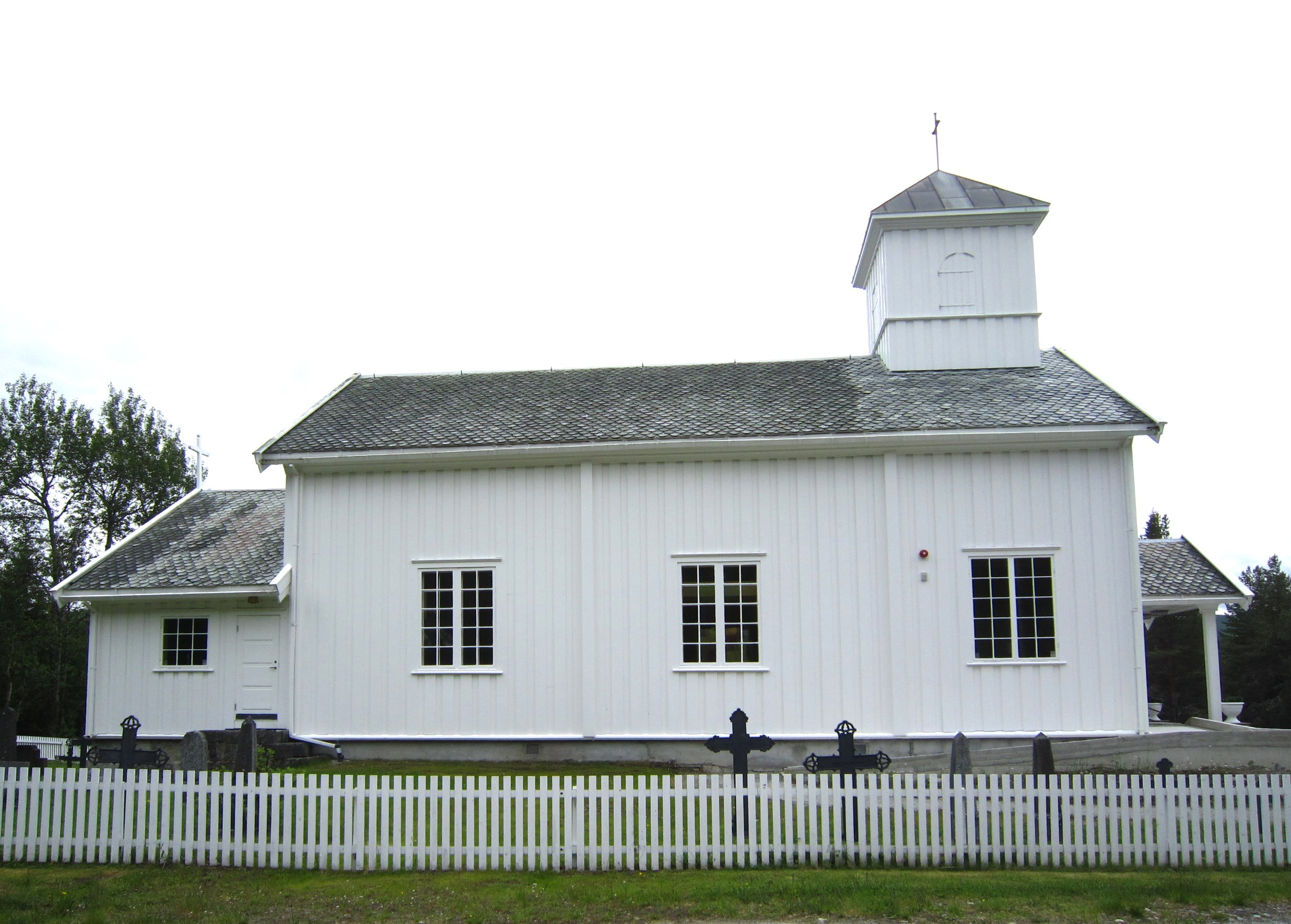
- View of the church
- Dagali Church
- 60°25′00″N 8°28′08″E
- Location: Hol, Buskerud
- Country: Norway
- Denomination: Church of Norway
- Churchmanship: Evangelical Lutheran

History
- Status: Parish church
- Founded: 1850
- Consecrated: 1850

Architecture
- Functional status: Active
- Architect: Hans Linstow
- Architectural type: Long church
- Completed: 1850 (176 years ago)

Specifications
- Capacity: 200
- Materials: Wood

Administration
- Diocese: Tunsberg
- Deanery: Hallingdal prosti
- Parish: Dagali og Skurdalen
- Norwegian Cultural Heritage Site
- Type: Church
- Status: Automatically protected
- ID: 84011

Dagali Church (Norwegian: Dagali kirke) is a parish church of the Church of Norway in Hol Municipality in Buskerud county, Norway. It is located in the village of Dagali. It is one of the churches for the Dagali og Skurdalen parish which is part of the Hallingdal prosti (deanery) in the Diocese of Tunsberg. The white, wooden church was built in a long church design in 1850 using plans drawn up by the architect Hans Linstow. The church seats about 200 people.

== History ==
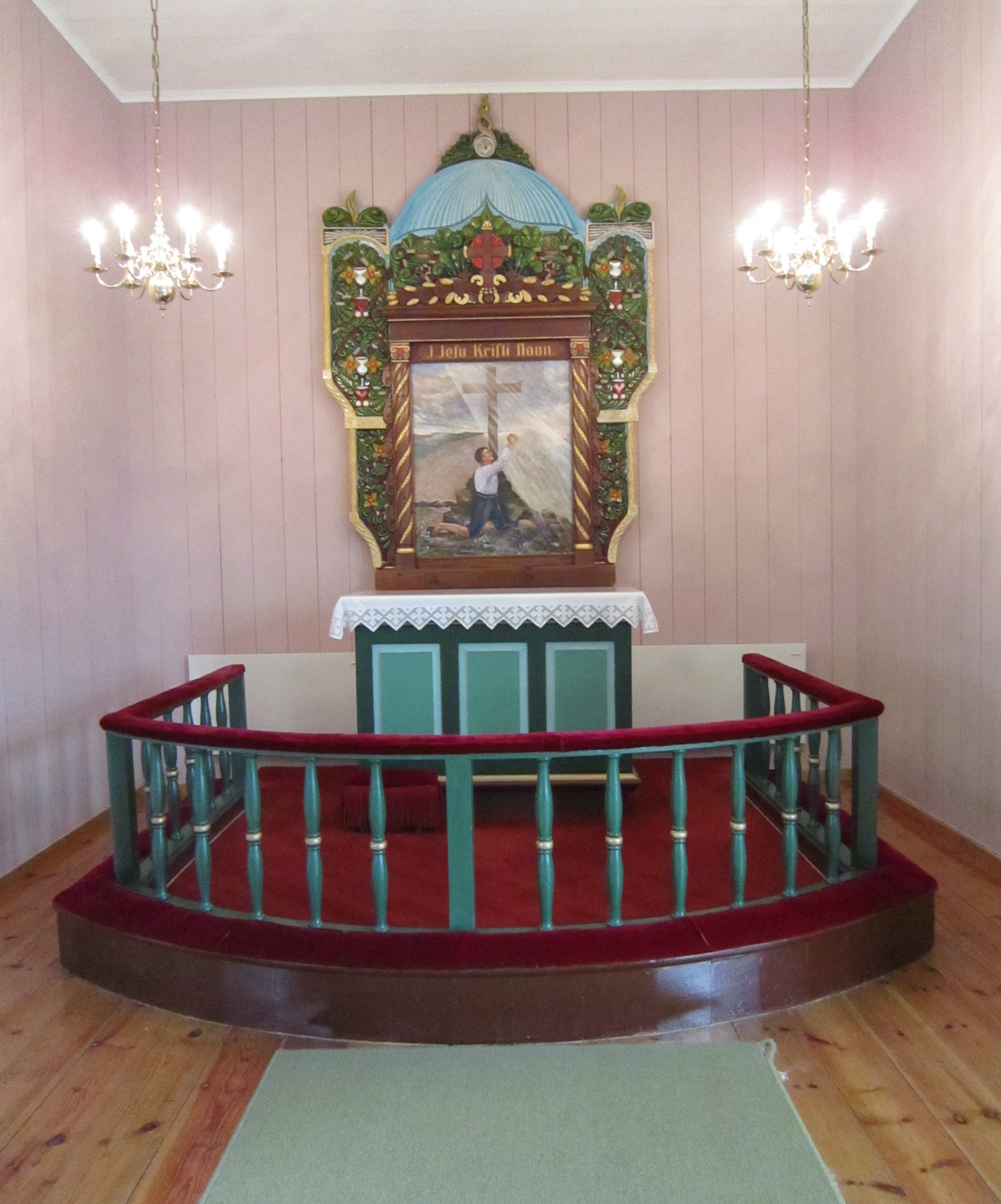
View of the interior

In 1819, a cemetery was built in Dagali, with plans for a church to eventually be built on the site. Due to ground conditions, however, the church was not built there. Many years passed, and eventually a new site was found in Dagali. The plans for the church were drawn by Hans Linstow and Ole S. Fjøslien was hired as the builder. The new church was consecrated 4 August 1850. The building is a long church using log construction. The church was originally smaller, but in 1912–13 it was expanded eastwards with a narrower choir surrounded by a sacristy (in the south) and a baptismal waiting room (in the north), and a new west tower was built. The master builder on this occasion was Peder Svendsen, who received help from Hjalmar Welhaven. The church was expanded again in 1972–73. Then the west tower was demolished and the church was expanded by 4 metres (13 ft) westwards in full width and height. Above this has been added a new bell tower on the roof, and there is a small roof projection all the way to the west. The sacristy extensions in the east were also expanded.

== See also ==
- List of churches in Tunsberg
