= Knut Dybsjord =

Norwegian politician

Knut Henriksen Dybsjord (24 April 1809 – 4 July 1866) was a Norwegian politician, Haugean lay minister and temperance movement activist.

Dybsjord was born at Hol in Buskerud, Norway. During the 1830s, Dybsjord traveled in Buskerud, Valdres and in West Norway preaching in the Haugean tradition (haugianere). He was elected mayor of Ål and Hol in Hallingdal in 1850. In 1854 he chaired the first missionary association in Hol, and in 1860 he chaired the local temperance league (avholdsbevegelsen). He died during 1866 and was buried at Hol Church (Hol kyrkje) at Hagafoss in Buskerud.

== See also ==
- 1919 Norwegian prohibition referendum
