= Stolsbergi =

Mountain in Norway

Highest point
- Coordinates: 60°46′36″N 7°53′17″E

Geography
- Location: Buskerud, Norway

Stolsbergi is a mountain of Hol municipality, Buskerud, in southern Norway.
