= Hol Church (Buskerud) =

Church in Buskerud, Norway

- Hol kirke
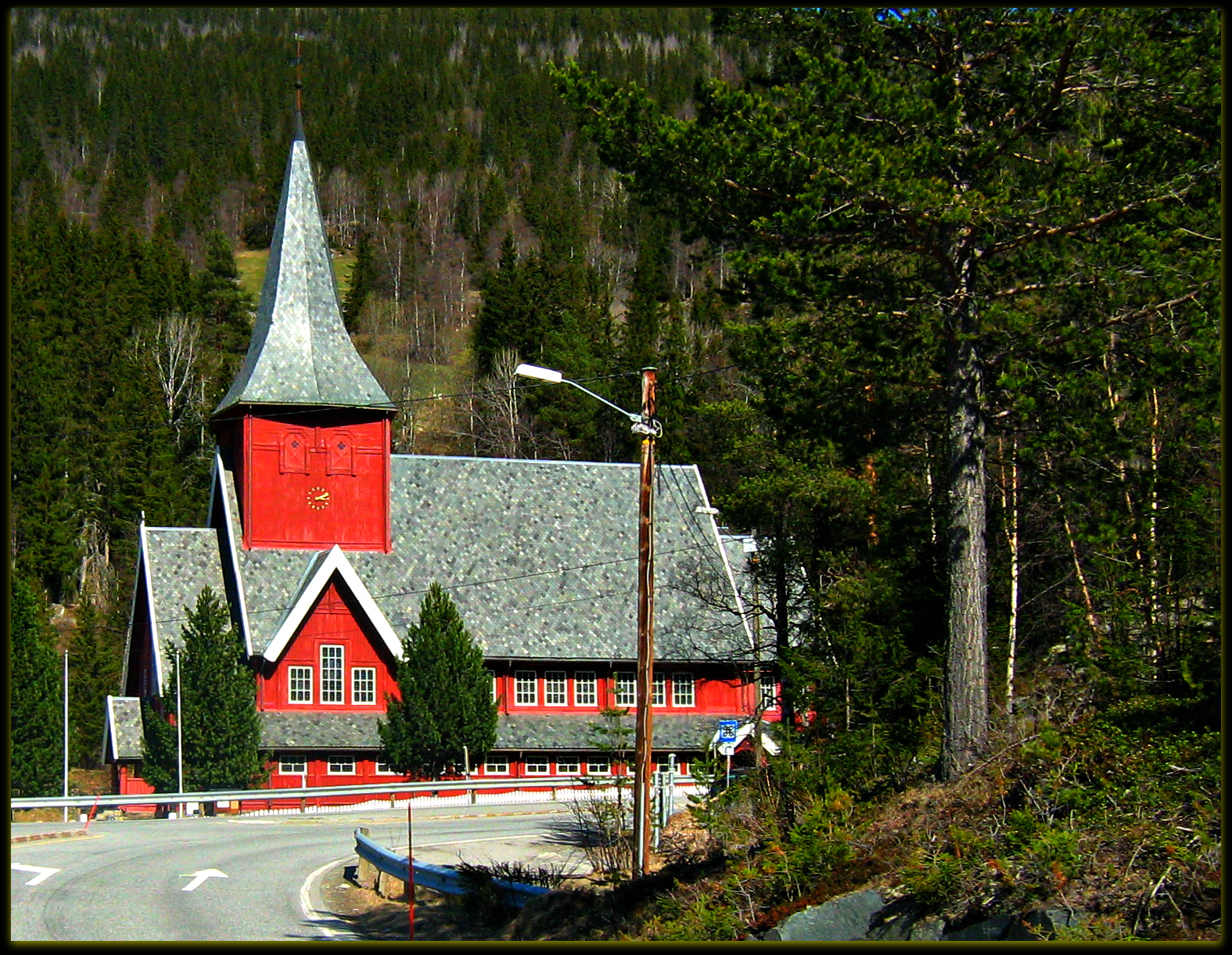
- View of the church
- Hol Church
- 60°35′54″N 8°20′52″E
- Location: Hol, Buskerud
- Country: Norway
- Denomination: Church of Norway
- Churchmanship: Evangelical Lutheran

History
- Status: Parish church
- Founded: 1924
- Consecrated: 1924

Architecture
- Functional status: Active
- Architect: Ole Steen
- Architectural type: Long church
- Completed: 1924 (102 years ago)

Specifications
- Capacity: 500
- Materials: Wood

Administration
- Diocese: Tunsberg
- Deanery: Hallingdal prosti
- Parish: Hol og Hovet
- Norwegian Cultural Heritage Site
- Type: Church
- Status: Listed
- ID: 84595

Hol Church (Norwegian: Hol kirke) is a parish church of the Church of Norway in Hol Municipality in Buskerud county, Norway. It is located in the village of Hagafoss. It is one of the churches for the Hol og Hovin parish which is part of the Hallingdal prosti (deanery) in the Diocese of Tunsberg. The red, wooden church was built in a long church design in 1924 using plans drawn up by the architect Ole Steen. The church seats about 500 people.

== History ==
Before Ustedalen Chapel was opened in 1890, the Old Hol Church was the only church in the vast Hol Municipality. The ancient church was in poor condition and too small by the turn of the 20th century. Construction of a new Hol Church to replaced the old church, became possible after a testamentary gift in 1914. Ole Stein designed the new church and construction began in 1918. The church was built in Hagafoss, about 3 kilometres (1.9 mi) southeast of the old church. The new building was consecrated in 1924. The new Hol Church is a wooden long church with obvious stave church influences. The nave is rectangular and the choir ends with an apse in the east. The choir is surrounded by sacristies.

== Media gallery ==
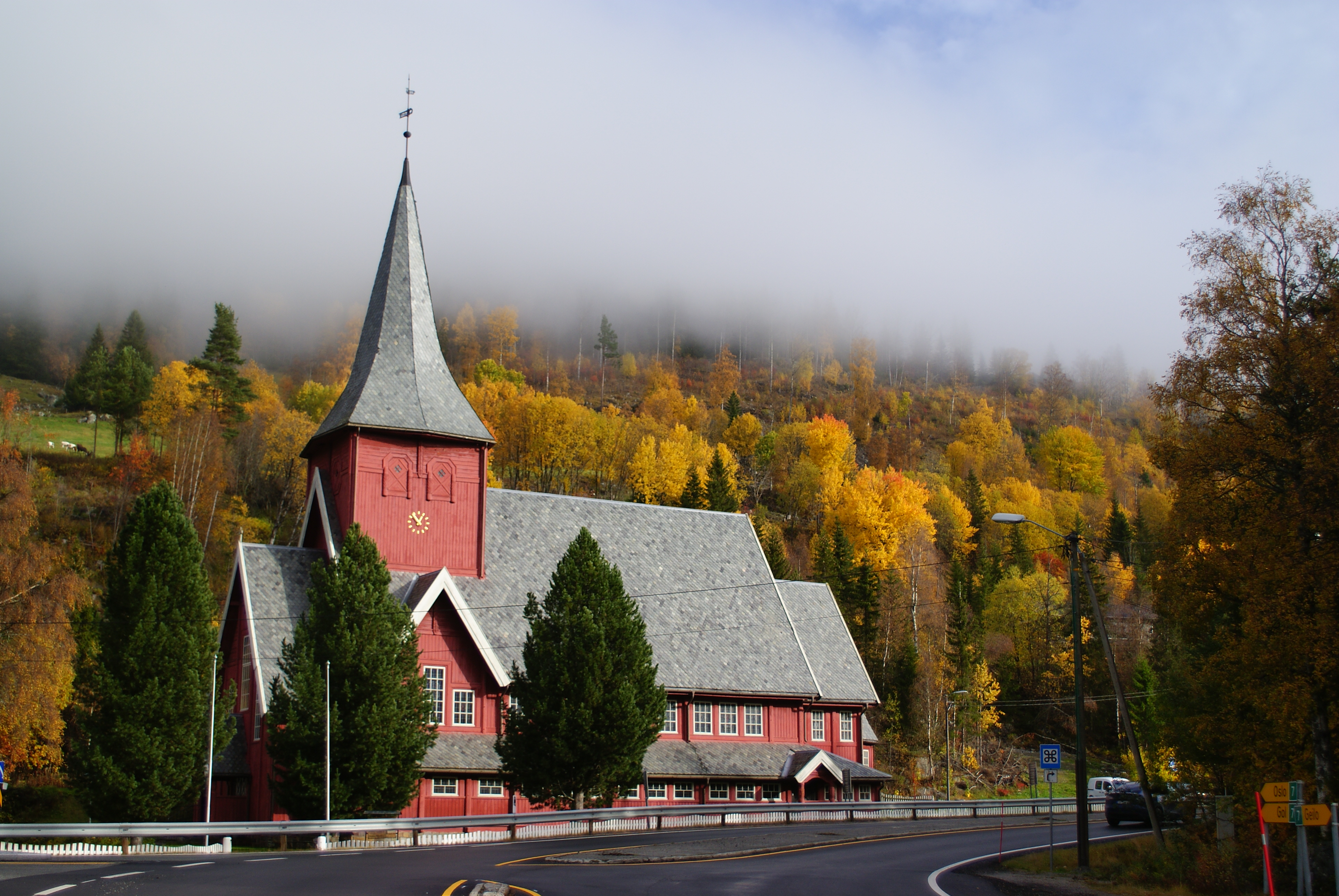

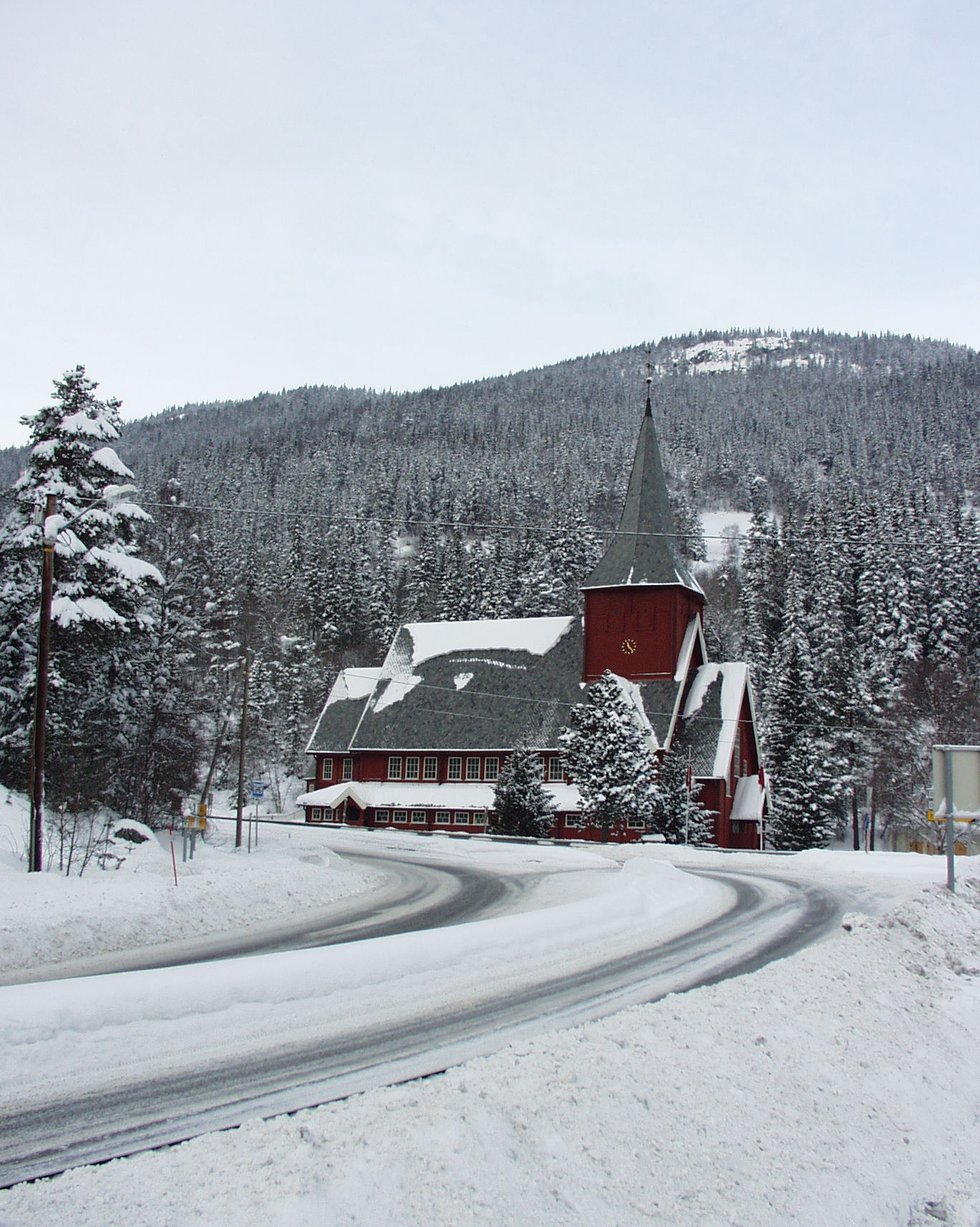

== See also ==
- List of churches in Tunsberg
