= Skorpetindene =

Mountain in Norway

Skorpetinden

Highest point
- Coordinates: 70°01′50″N 23°04′14″E

Geography
- Location: Buskerud, Norway

Skorpetindene are mountain peaks in Hol municipality, Buskerud, in southern Norway. There are two peaks with this name within the same area. Skorpetinden (1,639m) lies to the north of Skorpa while the higher Skorpetinden peak lies to the south and is 1,706m in elevation. Both peaks lie in the northern end of Buskerud. Coordinates shown here are for the higher of the two peaks (south).
