= Usta (Norway) =

River in Buskerud, Norway

Coordinates: 60°35′N 8°23′E

Usta Usteåne
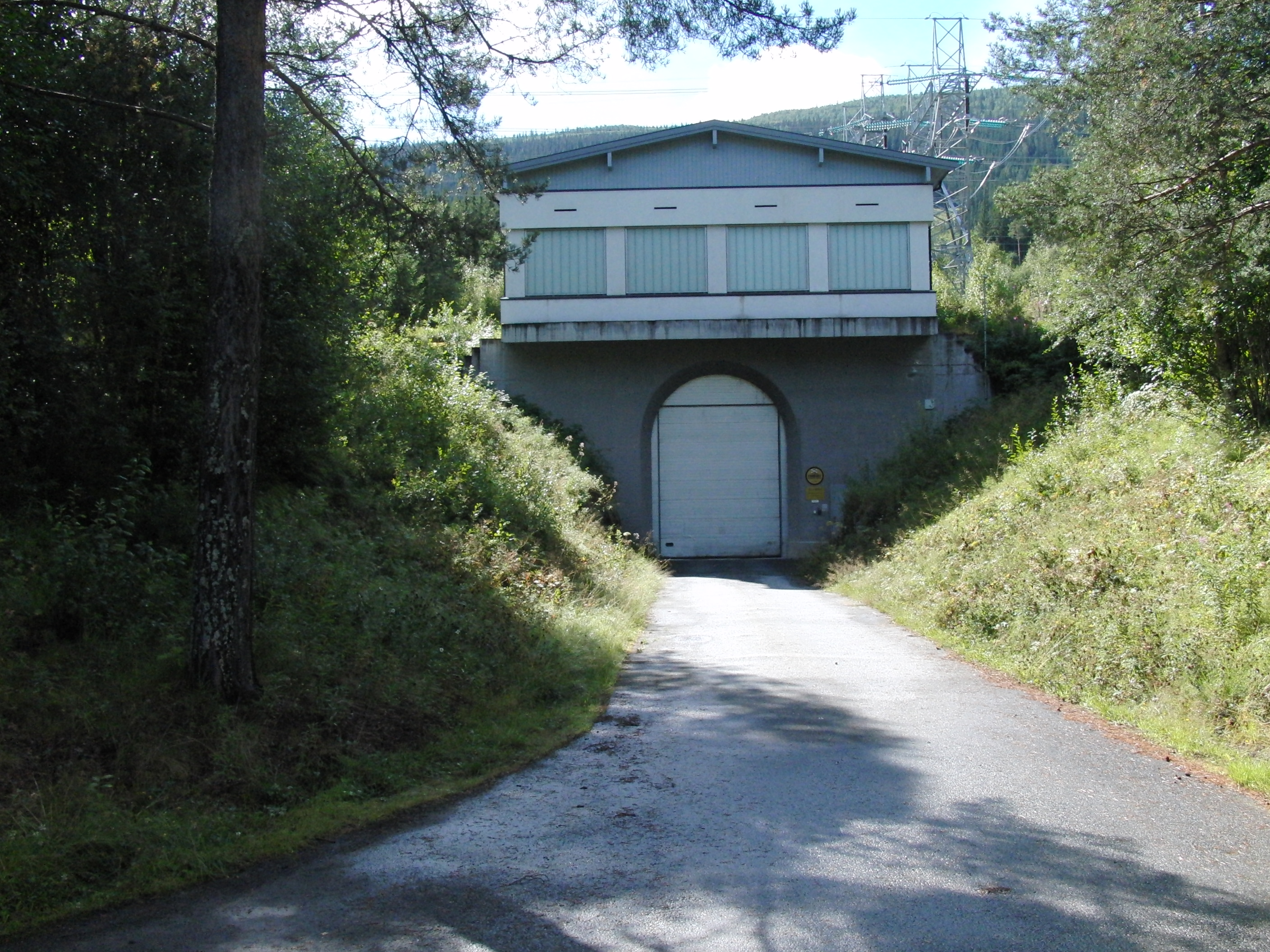
- Usta kraftverk (Hydroelectric Power Station)

Location
- Country: Norway
- County: Buskerud
- Municipality: Hol

Physical characteristics
- Source: Lake Ustevatn
  - location: Hol, Buskerud, Norway
- Mouth: Confluence with Holselva
  - location: Hol, Buskerud, Norway

Basin features
- Progression: Holselva
- Hydroelectric power: Uses 540 m fall from Ustevatn and Rødungen; avg. production 780 GWh; owned by E-CO Energi

Usta or Usteåne is a river located in the municipality of Hol in Buskerud, Norway. It flows from Lake Ustevatn traveling northeast down the valley of Ustedalen to its confluence with Holselva. The ski resort at Geilo is situated just north of the river, about halfway down Ustedalen valley. The valley stretches about 20 kilometres (12 mi) east from Ustevatn and meetings Holsdalføret below Hagafoss.
