= Usta River =

Usta River may refer to:

- Usta (Norway)
- Usta River (Russia)
