= Pål Olson Grøt =

Norwegian rosemaling painter

Pål Olson Grøt (1813–1906) was a Norwegian rosemaling painter who belonged to the most important group of rosemaling painters in Hol. He was born in Hol in 1813 and lived until he moved to the village of Hovet, Buskerud, in 1852. He died there in 1906.

== Genealogy ==
The genealogy, the family history of Pål Olson Grøt, small parts of it, are registered in several books and websites. However, there are differences in names, the way of writing the names, and differences in birth dates. In the book Rosemåling i Hallingdal, the author Nils Ellingsgard writes that Grøt painted himself on a wooden coffer, and named himself Paul Olsen Neeraal, born on December 15, 1813.

According to the church book however, Ellingsgard writes that Grøt was baptized on December 13, 1812. The digitized Hol Kirkebog (Church book of Hol) starts in 1900, and cannot offer information about his birth. The date of his death, in 1906, is not registered in the Hol Kirkebog, probably because Grøt lived in Hovet, Buskerud at that time. Hovet got its own graveyard in 1890, located at what was then named the Håkonsethaugen, probably the same place as where the church had been built in 1910.

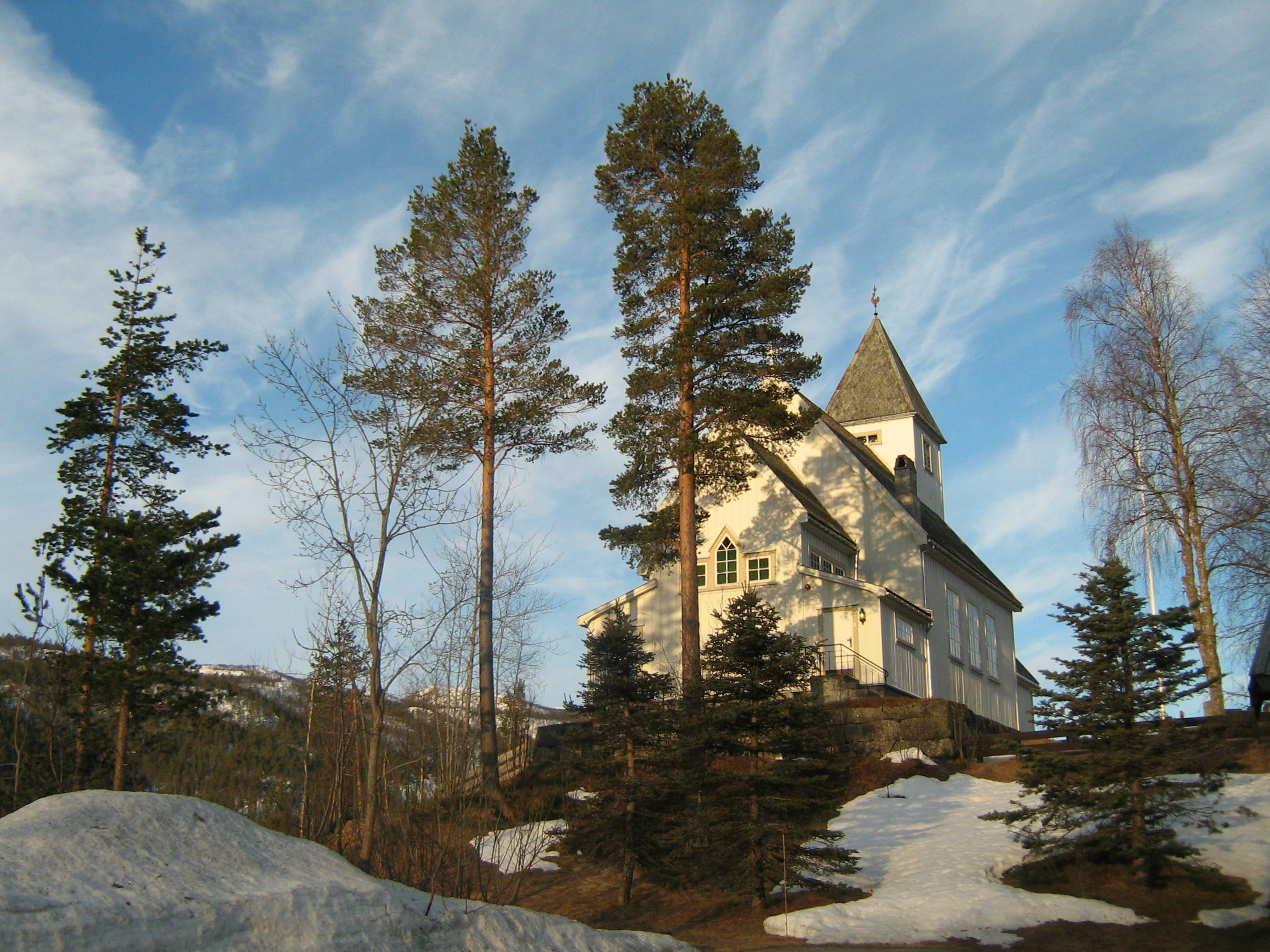
The church of Hovet

This church is on a haugen, a tiny hill, very near to the Håkonsæt Fjellvilla. In MyHeritage Pål Olson Grøt is named Paul Olsen Grøtt, born December 13, 1813, died February 1, 1906. The Norwegian Wikipedia page about Pål Olson Grøt follows the church book archives.

=== The name Nerolshaugen ===
According to the book, Pål Grøt was born and raised at Nerolshaugen. Neeraal pronounced in Norwegian sounds the same as the word Nerol. In the village Hol, there is a street named Nerolsvegen, which means literally the vegen (street) of Nerol. Probably, Nerolsvegen had once been named Nerolshaugen. The word haugen is derived from the old Norwegian haug, a word for a little hill, but also for farm homesteads. The street "Nerolsvegen" is indeed on a haugen. The word Nerolshaugen means literally the haugen of Nerol. The word Nerol is also in the family name of Pål Olson Grøt's father: Ola Eirikson Nerol. It was a habit in that time to use the place where one lived next to the family name.

=== The name Grøt ===
Pål Olson Nerolshaugen changed his name into Pål Olson Grøt when he moved to Hovet in 1852, and bought a farm on land with the name Grøt. The true family name is therefore Olson. The farm where Pål Olson Grøt lived still belongs to his family. It is unclear why an extra t has been added to the name Grøt. In the family tree one can see family members with both spellings.

=== The name Olson ===
Since Pål Olson Grøt's father's first name was Ola, "Ola's son" has obviously been merged into "Ol's sønn", and finally into Olsen, which sounds the same as Ol's sønn. Pål Olson Grøt wrote his own name as Paul Olsen, with an e. Others, like Nils Ellingsgard, wrote the name as Pål Olson, with an o. On the MyHeritage page the name is written as Paul Olsen Grøtt, with an e. Daughters of Ola were named Olsdatter. Datter is Norwegian for daughter.

=== The name Pål ===
In the My Heritage page Pål Olson Grøt's first name has been changed into the American name Paul. Nils Ellingsgard mentions in his book that several children of Pål Olson Grøt moved to the United States.

=== His life in Hovet ===
In 1852 Pål Olson Nerolshaugen moved to Hovet, and started living on a farm, built on a land with the name Grøt. From that time on he named himself Pål Olson Grøt. On April 11, 1860, when he was 47 years old, and eight years after he moved to Hovet, he married Marita Iversdatter Kleppo, born in Hovet on November 15, 1839. They had six children. Two sons and one daughter emigrated to the US. Pål Olson Grøt died in 1906, in Hovet, and is probably buried on the graveyard of Hovet, then named Håkonsethaugen. His wife Marita Iversdatter Kleppo died in 1920.

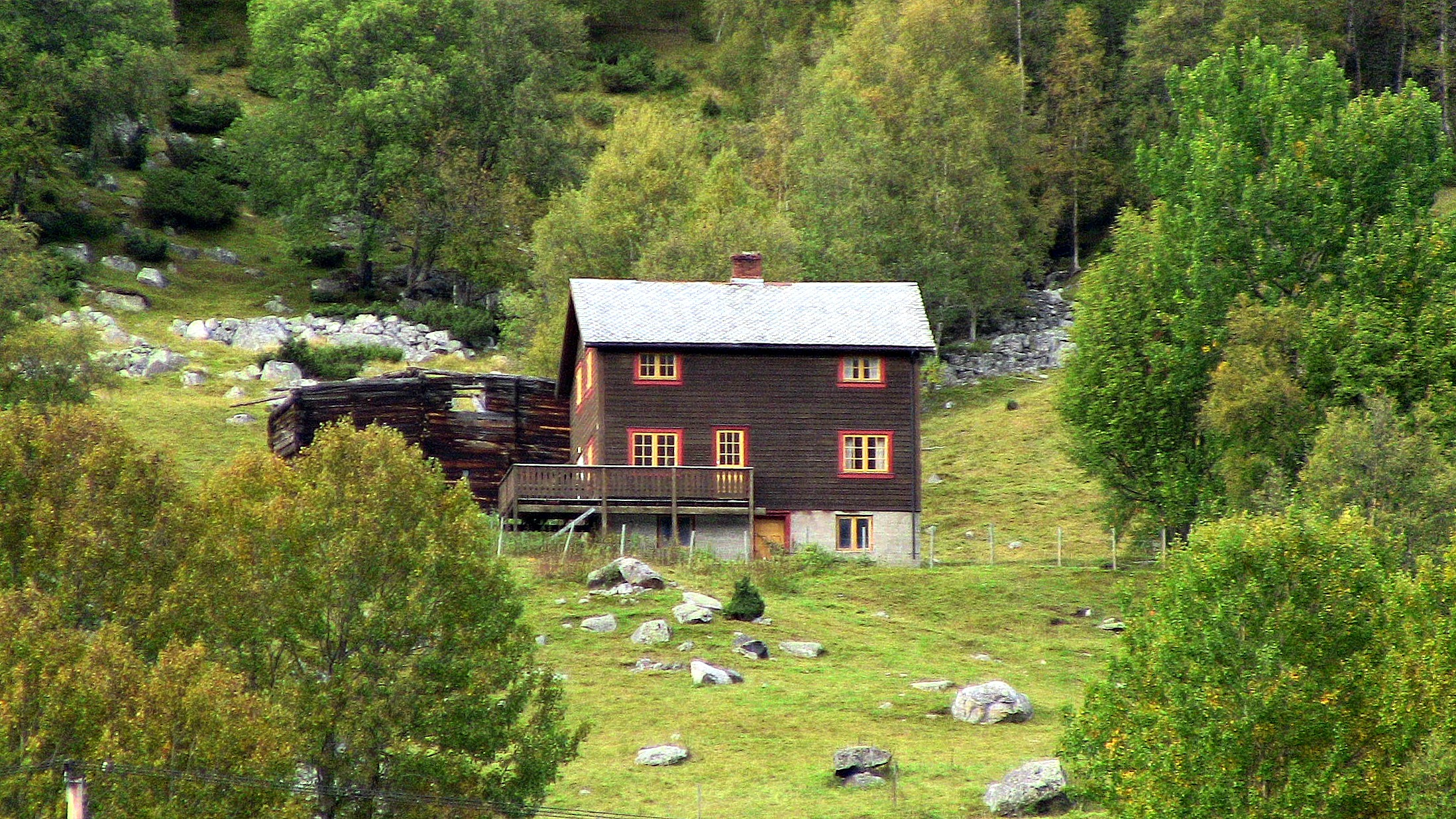
Farm in Hovet, Hallingdal, where Grøt lived

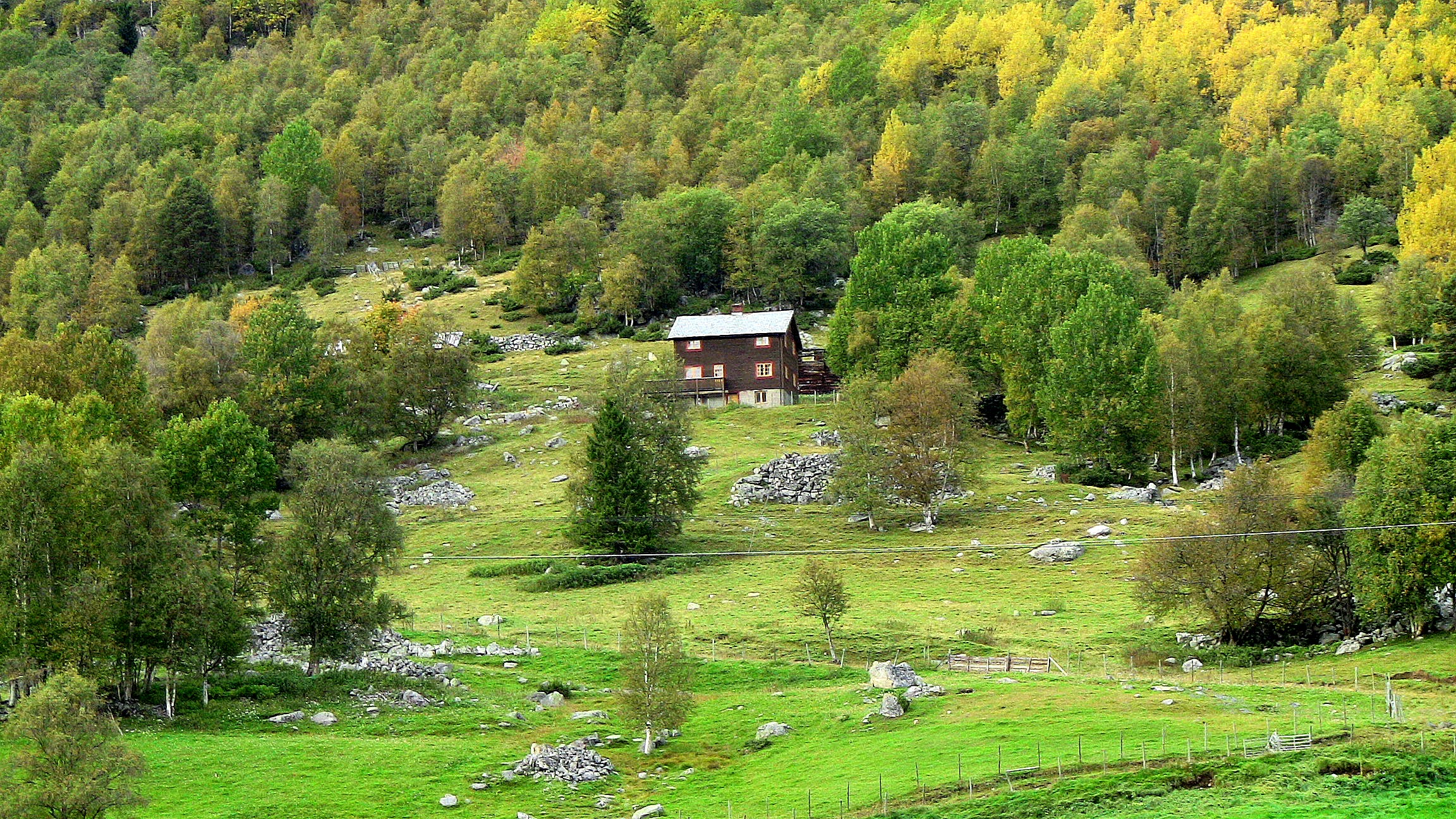
Farm in Hovet, where Grøt lived

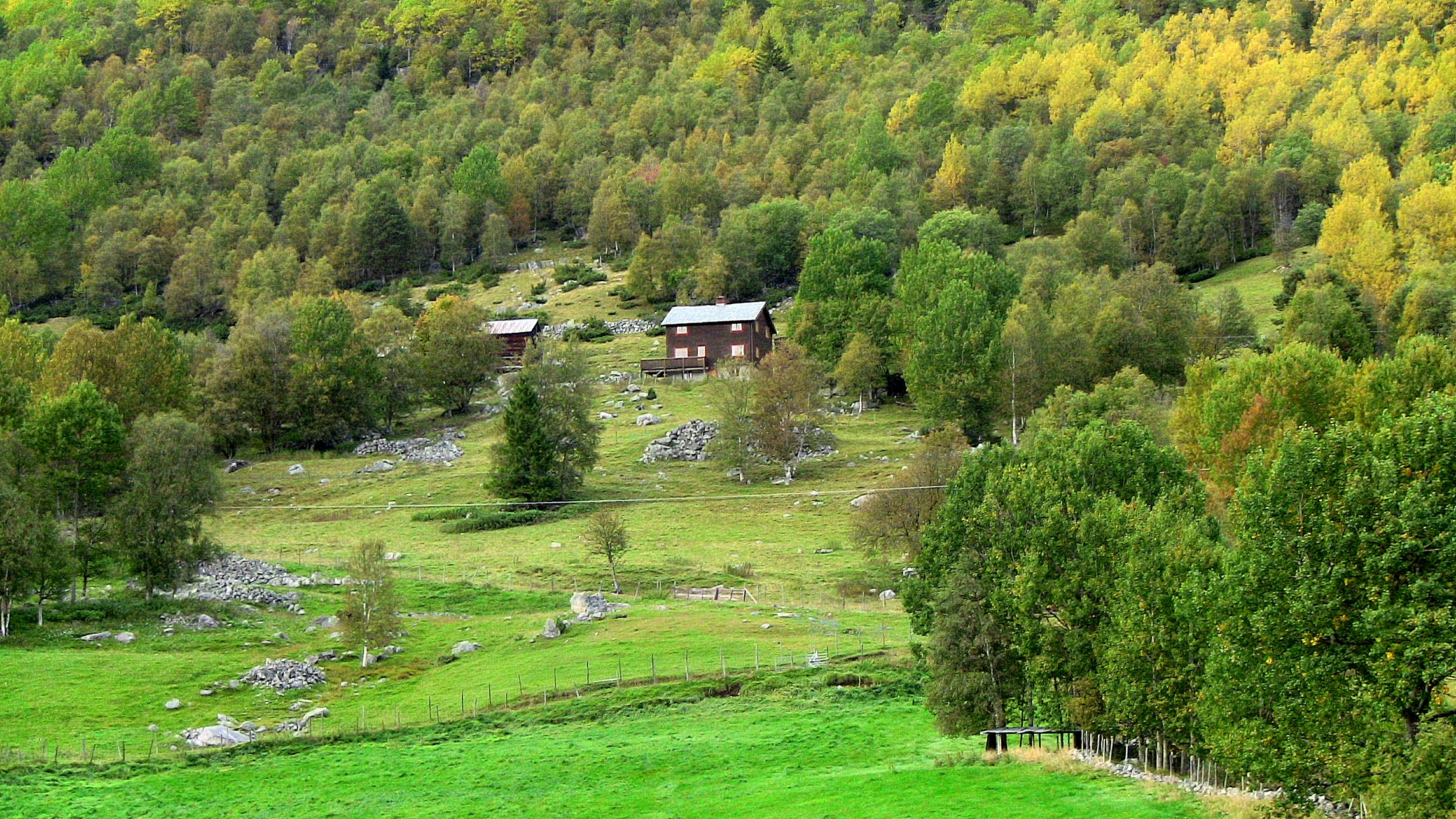
Farm in Hovet, where Grøt lived

== Rosemaling ==
Rosemaling means "rose painting", and is a traditional Norwegian decorative painting style. Rosemaling in Norway originated in the low-land areas of eastern Norway particularly in Telemark and Hallingdal, but also in Numedal and Setesdal and in other valleys in Vest-Agder, Hordaland, Sogn og Fjordane and Rogaland. It came into existence around 1750, when Baroque and Rococo, artistic styles of the upper class, were introduced into Norway's rural culture.

Pål Olson Grøt lived in the traditional district of Hallingdal. Characteristic for the Hallingdal style are Baroque scrolls and acanthus leaves wrapped around a central flower. The designs are symmetrical, using opaque color and not generally shaded. Backgrounds are red, black green, dark green, and a lighter blue green.

Pål Grøt was a pupil of Nils Bæra in Ål and became one of the most important rosemåling painters in Hol. His style has many features in common with the style of the Torstein Sand cohabitation. Torstein Sand was also a pupil of Nils Bæra. Both became important examples for contemporary and later rosemåling painters in Hol. Pål Grøt has painted many beer buns with great variety and imagination. His wooden box painting usually has a basic theme and the middle motifs are often animal figures or houses.

From the early 1830s rosemåling was Pål Olson Grøt's main activity, but he was also a skilled carpenter and wood carver. As a painter, he had his most productive period in the 1840s and 1850s.

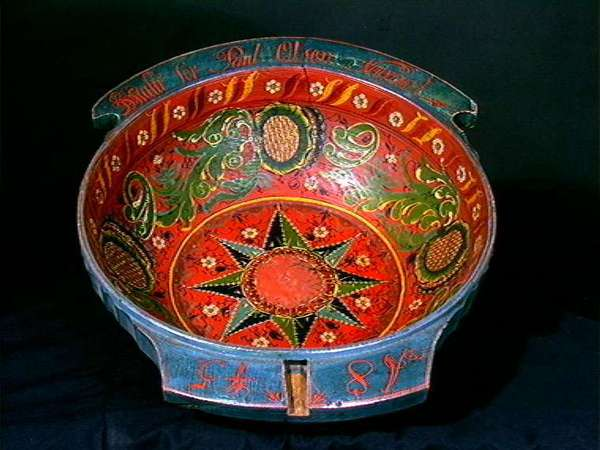
A trøys is a wooden container that was used primarily for beer, but also used for milk. A trøyser can have the shape of a bowl or trough with a tut or beak to pour on one side, and often with an ear or handle on the other. The word trøys is related to the Old Norse word trog and the English "through".

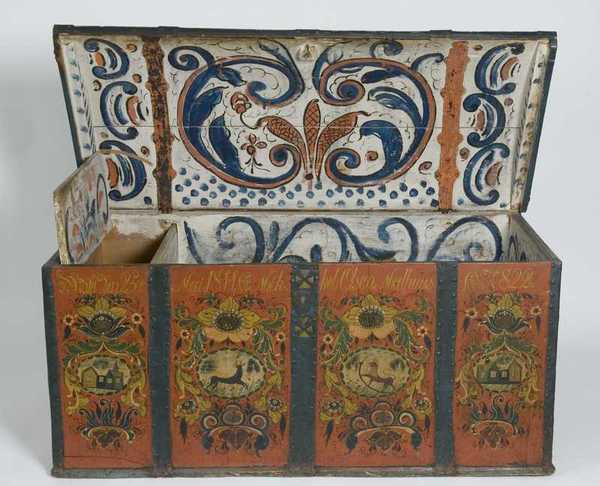
Wooden coffer

== Rosemålere ==
The Hallingdal rosemaling style, also used by Grøt, is symmetrical, similar to a butterfly, with a center and a left and right-hand side that mirror each other. It may be a coincidence that in the Norwegian word rosemålere is the name of a genus of butterflies (Anticlea). The name rosemåler sounds very similar to rosemaler.

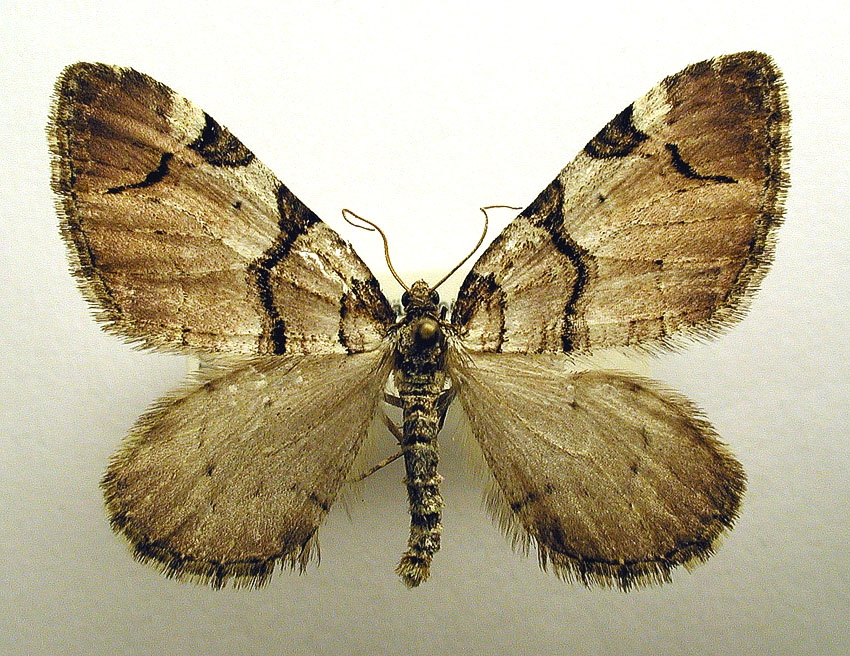
Anticlea derivata mounted, in Norwegian, fiolett rosemåler

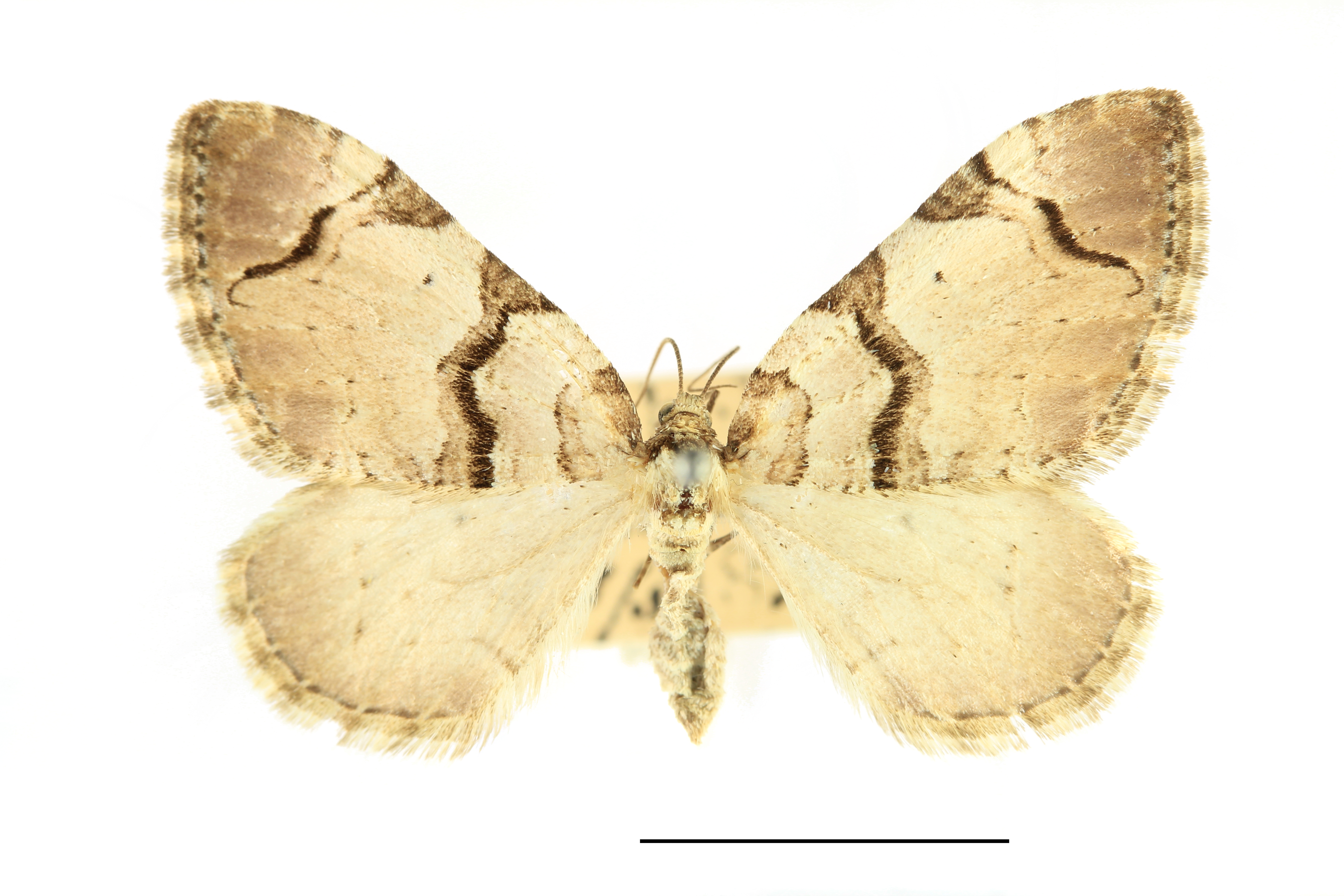
Anticlea derivata

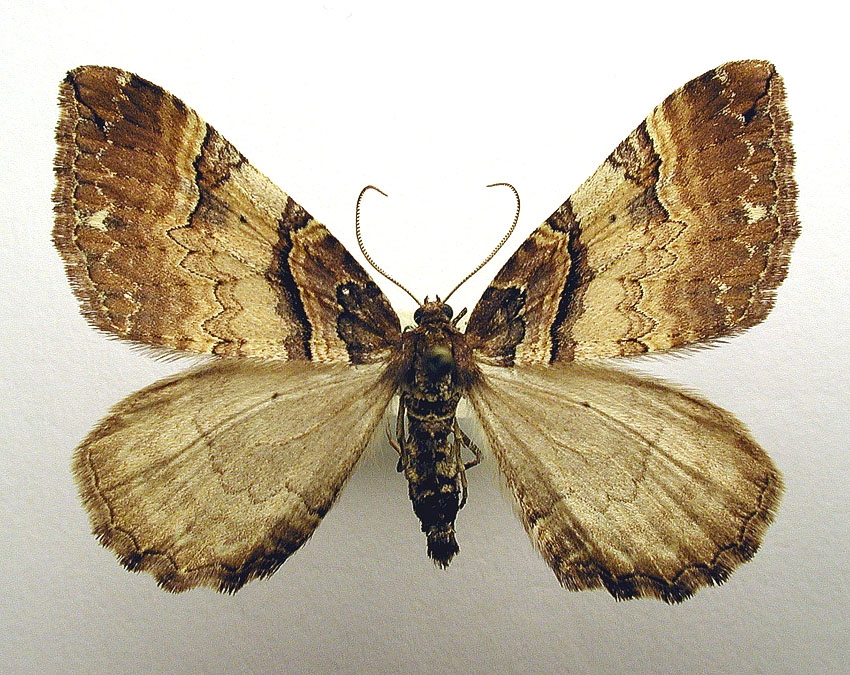
Earophila badiata, in Norwegian, brun rosemåler

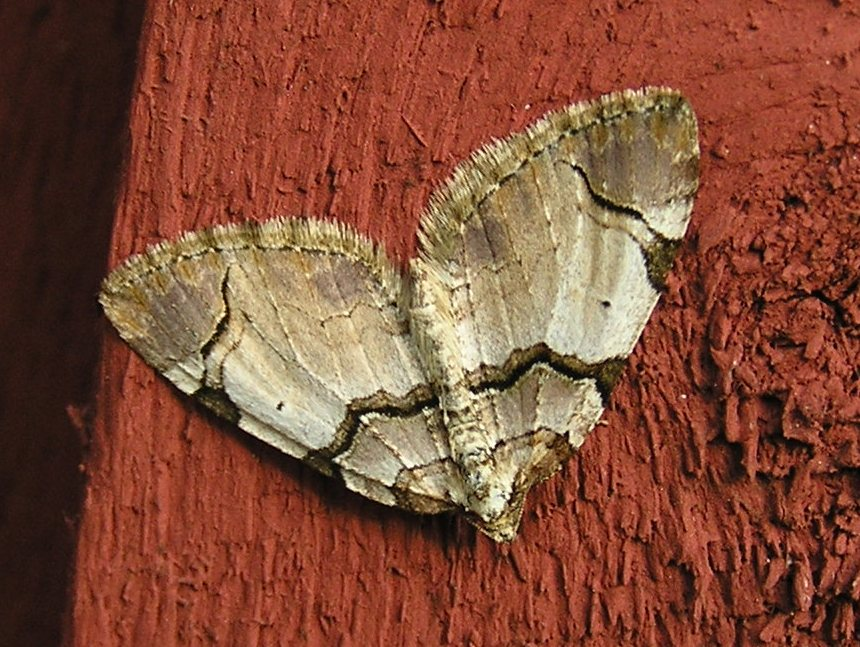
Anticlea derivata, in Norwegian, fiolett rosemåler

== Museums ==
Pål Grøt is represented in the collections at the Hol Bygdemuseum, Hallingdal Museum, Drammen Museum and the Norwegian Folk Museum.

== Literature ==
- Ellingsgard, Nils (1978): Rosemaling i Hallingdal. Oslo. ISBN 82-09-01493-5
- Ellingsgard, Nils (1982): "Pål, Olson Grøt" i: Norsk kunstnerleksikon bd. 1. s.807 f. Oslo 1982 ISBN 82-00-05689-9
