= Skarvsenden =

Mountain in Norway

Highest point
- Elevation: 1,705 m (5,594 ft)
- Coordinates: 60°33′38″N 8°03′00″E

Geography
- Location: Buskerud, Norway

Skarvsenden is a mountain of Hol municipality, Buskerud, in southern Norway.
