= Nygardsvatnet =

Lake in Hol, Norway

- Location within Norway
- Location: Hol (Buskerud)
- Coordinates: 60°30′44″N 7°49′5″E
- Basin countries: Norway
- Surface area: 3.36 km^{2} (1.30 sq mi)
- Shore length^{1}: 17.25 km (10.72 mi)
- Surface elevation: 991 m (3,251 ft)
- References: NVE
- ^{1} Shore length is not a well-defined measure.

Nygardsvatnet is a lake in the municipality of Hol in Buskerud county, Norway. The lake is situated south of the Hallingskarvet mountain range. The lake serves as a reservoir for Usta kraftverk, a hydroelectric plant which was put into operation in 1965. The water level is controlled by a dam at the outlet and a tunnel down to lakes Sløddfjorden and Ustevatn. The Usta kraftverk power plant is owned and operated by E- CO Energi.

== See also ==
- List of lakes in Norway
