= Kvisla, Buskerud =

Village in Norway

Coordinates: 60.5820°N 8.3146°E

Kvisla is a village in Hol municipality in Buskerud, Norway.

Norwegian National Road 7 (RV7) runs through the village. Kvisla is located between Hagafoss to the northeast and Geilo to the southwest. It is located on the north side of Ustedalen, about eight kilometers northeast of Geilo.
