= Old Hol Church =

Church in Buskerud, Norway

- Hol gamle kyrkje
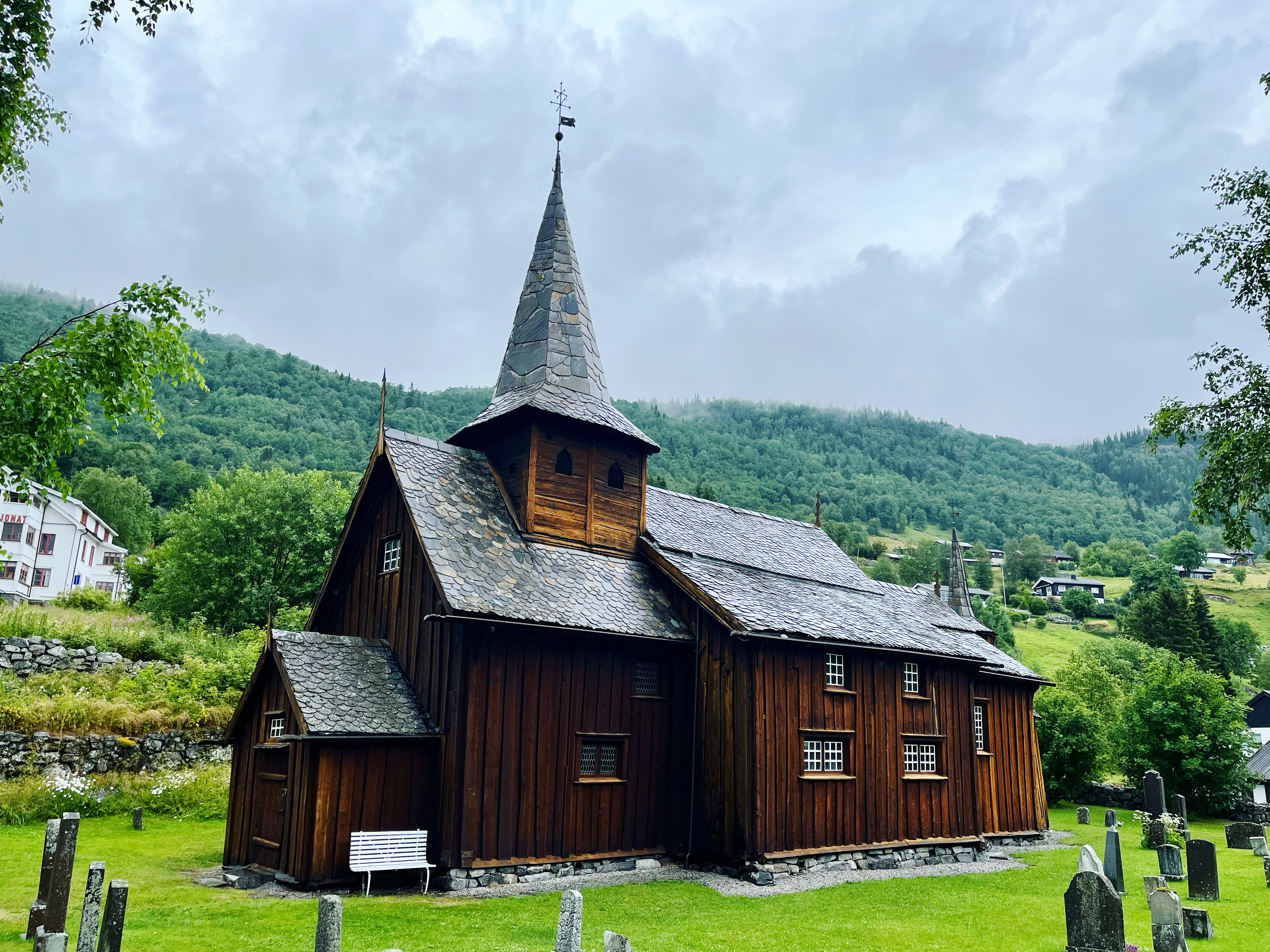
- View of the church
- Old Hol Church
- 60°36′54″N 8°18′01″E
- Location: Hol, Buskerud
- Country: Norway
- Denomination: Church of Norway
- Previous denomination: Catholic Church
- Churchmanship: Evangelical Lutheran

History
- Status: Parish church
- Founded: c. 1200
- Consecrated: c. 1200

Architecture
- Functional status: Active
- Architectural type: Cruciform
- Completed: c. 1200 (826 years ago)

Specifications
- Capacity: 180
- Materials: Wood

Administration
- Diocese: Tunsberg
- Deanery: Hallingdal prosti
- Parish: Hol og Hovet
- Norwegian Cultural Heritage Site
- Type: Church
- Status: Automatically protected
- ID: 84593

Old Hol Church (Norwegian: Hol gamle kyrkje) is a parish church of the Church of Norway in Hol Municipality in Buskerud county, Norway. It is located in the village of Hol. It is one of the churches for the Hol og Hovin parish which is part of the Hallingdal prosti (deanery) in the Diocese of Tunsberg. The brown, wooden church was built in a cruciform design around the year 1200. The church seats about 180 people.

== History ==
The earliest existing historical records of the church date back to the year 1328, but the church was not built that year. The church was likely built around the year 1200 in the early 13th century. The church originally had a rectangular nave, a narrower choir and apse, and there are said to have been arcades around the entire church. In the 16th century, the church was extended westwards. In 1697, the church was extended eastwards with Joen Joensson as the builder. The old choir and aspe were torn down and a new choir the same width as the nave was then built. In 1798-1799, the old stave-built parts were demolished and replaced new log construction, and the apse was rebuilt in the east to be used as a sacristy. The church was remodeled in 1882. In 1924, the new Hol Church was built on a site about 3 kilometres (1.9 mi) to the southeast of the old church. Since then, the old Hol Church has been taken out of regular use and is now mostly used for special occasions.

== Media gallery ==
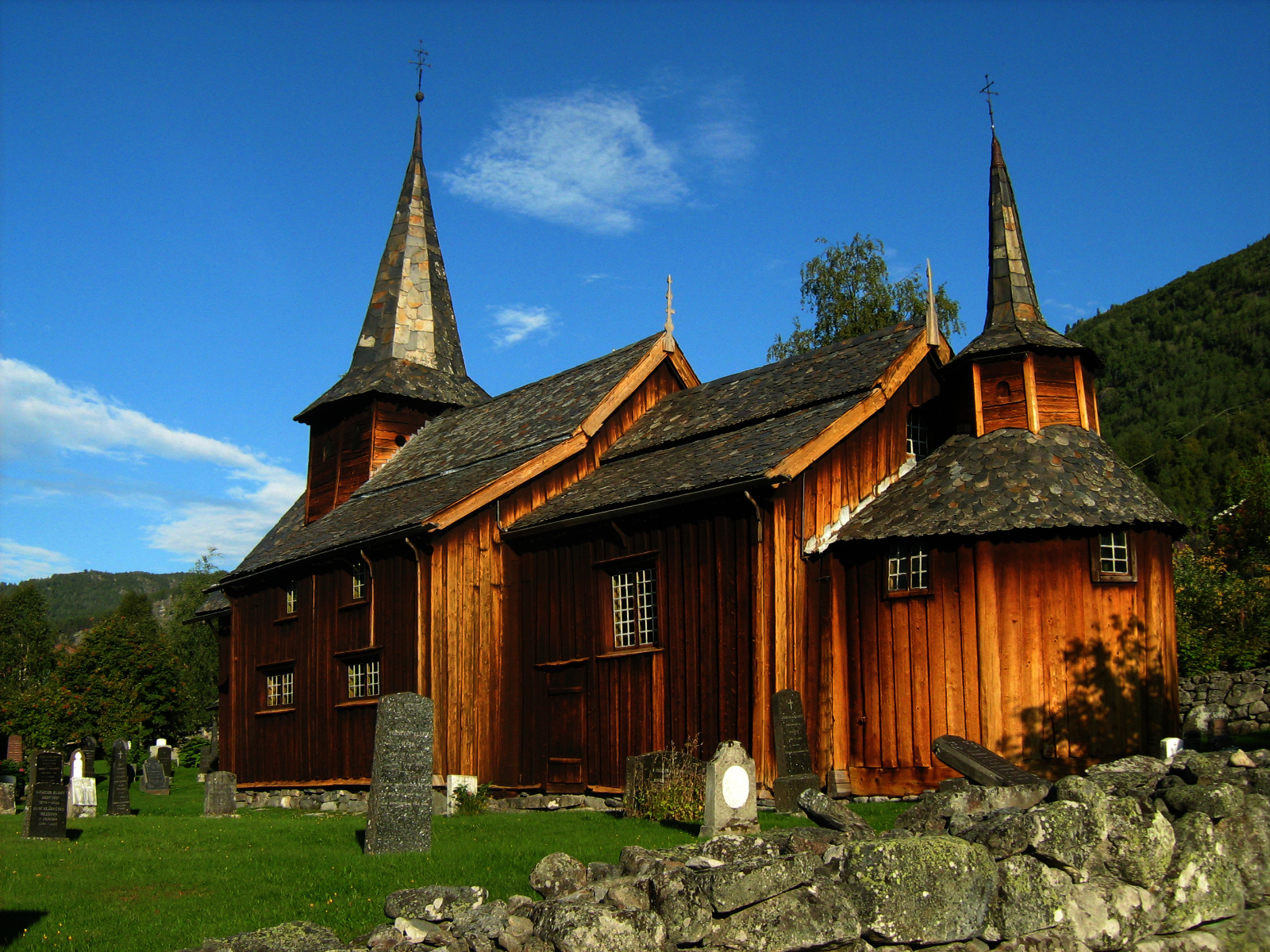

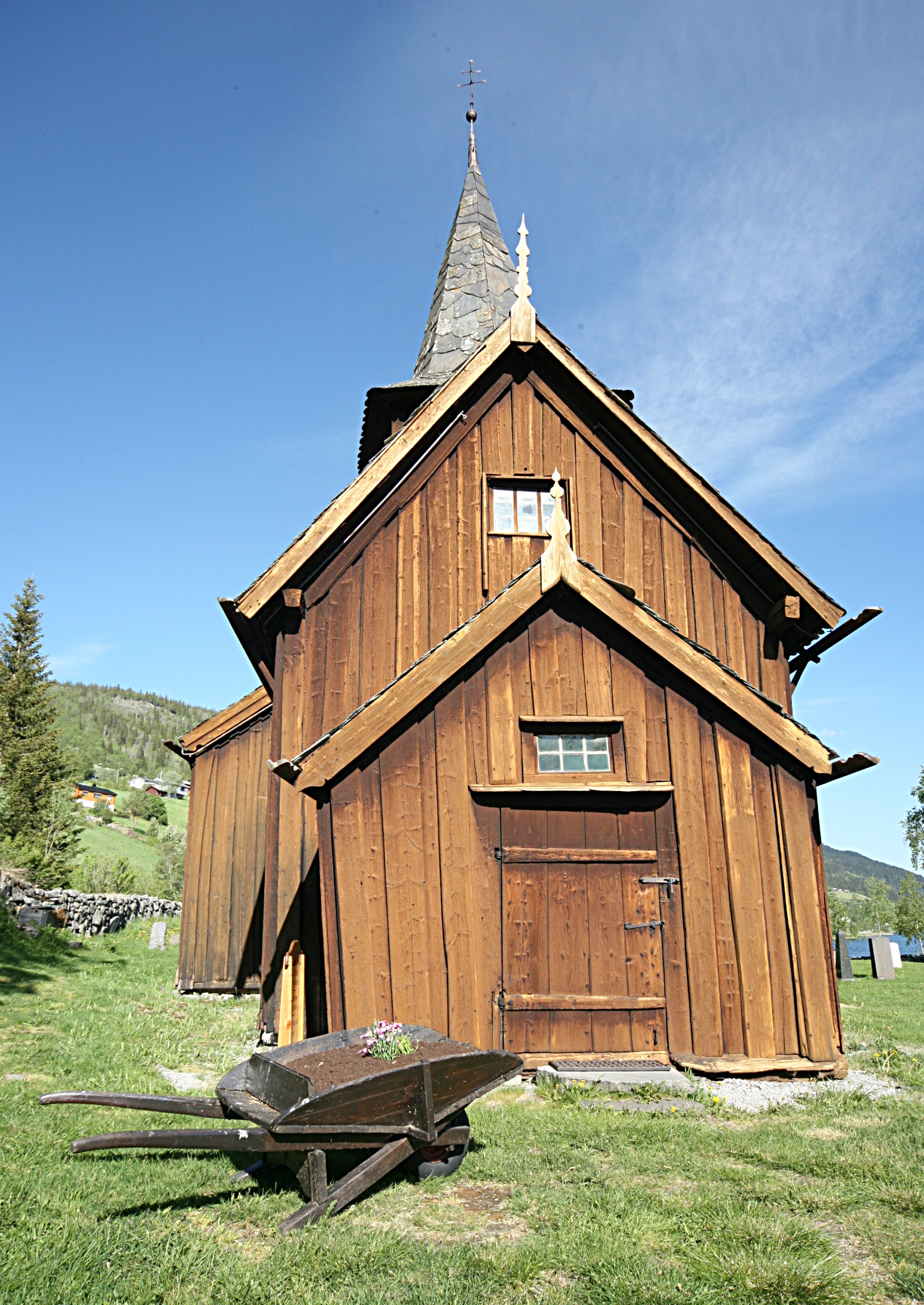

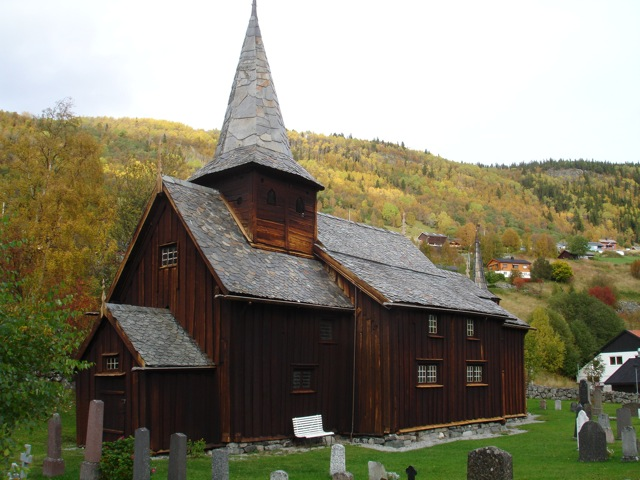

== See also ==
- List of churches in Tunsberg
