= Volanuten =

Mountain in Norway

Highest point
- Coordinates: 60°45′50″N 7°45′48″E

Geography
- Location: Buskerud, Norway

Volanuten is a mountain in Hol municipality, Buskerud, in southern Norway.
