= Urdvassnutene =

Mountain in Norway

Coordinates: 60°44′23″N 7°42′15″E

Urevassnutane

Highest point
- Elevation: 1,770 m (5,810 ft)
- Prominence: 270 m (890 ft)
- Isolation: 6.6 km (4.1 mi) to Blåbergi

Geography
- Location: Buskerud, Norway

Urdvassnutene is a mountain consisting of two peaks. The highest summit is borderpoint between the counties of Buskerud and Sogn og Fjordane in southern Norway.
