= Øvre Hein =

Lake in Buskerud, Norway

- Location within Buskerud Location within Norway
- Location: Nore og Uvdal, Hol (Buskerud)
- Coordinates: 60°22′17″N 7°52′6″E
- Basin countries: Norway
- Surface area: 6.72 km^{2} (2.59 sq mi)
- Shore length^{1}: 24.36 km (15.14 mi)
- Surface elevation: 1,113 m (3,652 ft)
- References: NVE
- ^{1} Shore length is not a well-defined measure.

Øvre Hein is a lake in the municipalities of Nore og Uvdal and Hol in Buskerud county, Norway. The lake is located in the eastern Hardangervidda and lies partly in the Hardangervidda National Park.

== See also ==
- List of lakes in Norway
