= Miljonuten =

Mountain in Norway

Coordinates: 60°34′38″N 8°0′21″E

Geography
- Location: Buskerud, Norway

Miljonuten is a mountain located in the municipality of Hol in Buskerud, Norway.
