= Haldalshøgdi =

Mountain in Norway

Highest point
- Prominence: 1,764 m (5,787 ft)
- Coordinates: 60°50′26″N 07°49′18″E

Geography
- Location: Hol, Buskerud, Norway

Haldalshøgdi is a mountain located in Hol in Buskerud, Norway.
