= Vedalen =

Valley in eastern Norway

Coordinates: 59°05′28″N 8°28′20″E

Vedalen is a small valley in eastern Norway. It is located in the municipality of Hol in Buskerud county. It is situated 7 km outside the town of Geilo. There are approximately 25 cottages in the valley. Vedalen is a pastoral valley situated by the river Vedalsvatnet. The valley contains a number of small lakes which are suitable for fishing.
