= Ørteren =

Lake in Norway

- Location within Buskerud Location within Norway
- Location: Hol (Buskerud)
- Coordinates: 60°28′13″N 7°47′43″E
- Basin countries: Norway
- Surface area: 10.46 km^{2} (4.04 sq mi)
- Shore length^{1}: 31.49 km (19.57 mi)
- Surface elevation: 1,147 m (3,763 ft)
- References: NVE
- ^{1} Shore length is not a well-defined measure.

Ørteren is a lake in the municipality of Hol in Buskerud county, Norway.

== Location ==
Ørteren is located in Hardangervidda. Norwegian National Road 7 runs along the east side of the Lake.

== Power Plant ==
Ørteren is regulated for Ørteren Kraftverk, a hydroelectric power plant at Haugastøl. The power plant utilizes a drop of 160 meters between Ørteren and Sløtfjorden. It went into production in 1966. The dam and the intake were built by Oslo Energi and are currently operated by E- CO.

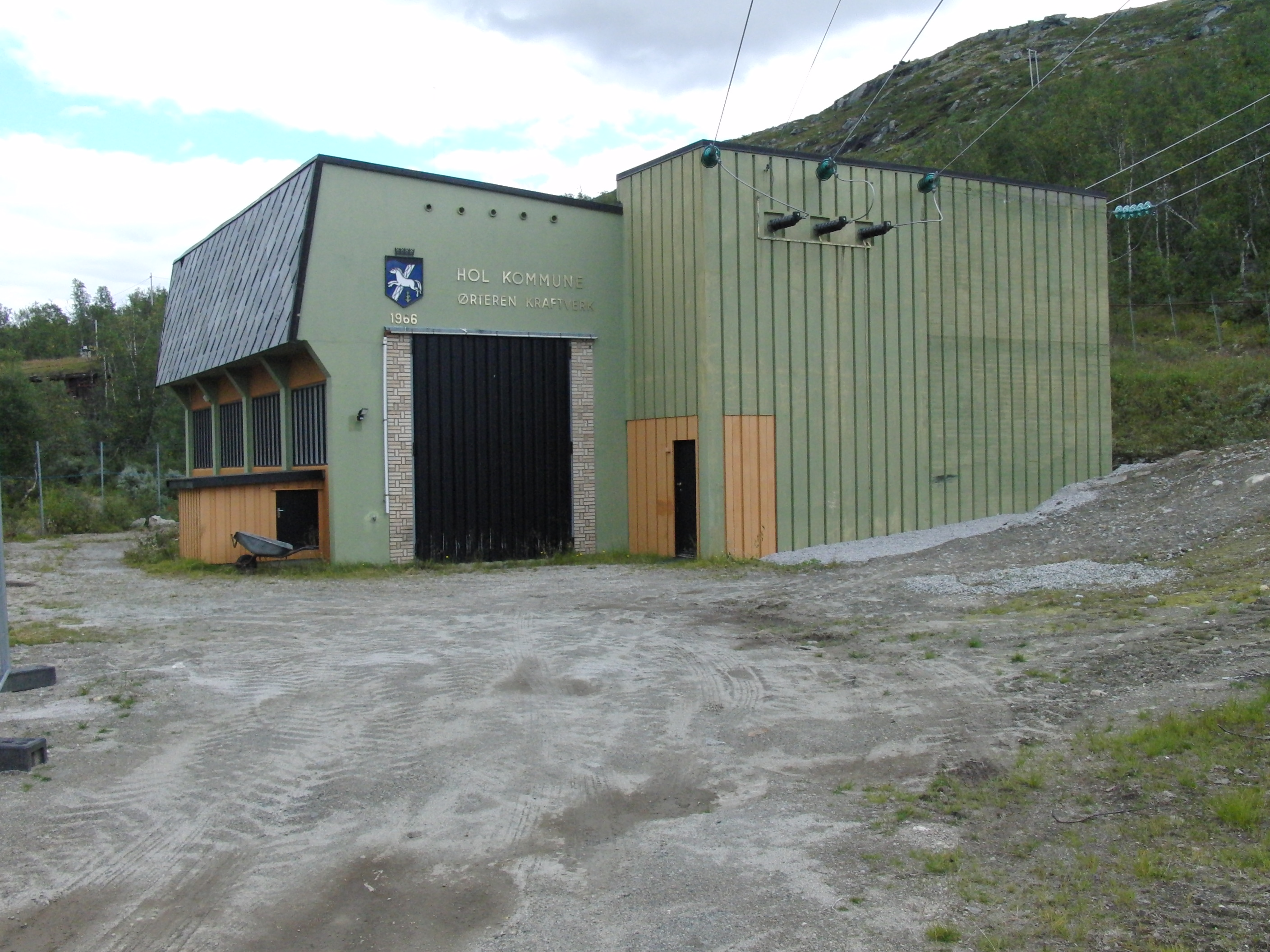
Ørteren kraftverk

== See also ==
- List of lakes in Norway
