= Storefjellsnuten =

Mountain in Norway

Highest point
- Coordinates: 60°51′37″N 8°04′51″E

Geography
- Location: Buskerud, Norway

Storefjellsnuten is a mountain of Hol municipality, Buskerud, in southern Norway.
