= Kyrkjedørsnuten =

Mountain in Norway

Highest point
- Elevation: 1,790 m (5,870 ft)
- Prominence: 51 m (167 ft)
- Isolation: 1.3 km (0.81 mi)
- Coordinates: 60°37′58″N 7°38′09″E

Geography
- Location: Vestland, Norway
- Parent range: Hallingskarvet

Kyrkjedørsnuten is a mountain in Norway. The 1,790-metre (5,870 ft) tall mountain lies on the border of Hol Municipality in Buskerud county and Ulvik Municipality in Vestland county. It is located in the Hallingskarvet mountains and inside Hallingskarvet National Park It
