= Galdene =

Mountain in Norway

Coordinates: 60°40′37″N 8°06′49″E

Geography
- Location: Buskerud, Norway

Galdene is a mountain in the municipality of Hol in Buskerud, Norway.
