= Julsennosi =

Mountain in Norway

Coordinates: 60°51′04″N 8°02′34″E

Highest point

Geography
- Location: Buskerud, Norway

Julsennosi is a mountain in the municipality of Hol in Buskerud, Norway.
