= Ljøtebotnberget =

Mountain in Norway

Coordinates: 60°38′27″N 7°41′34″E

Highest point
- Elevation: 1,721 m (5,646 ft)

Geography
- Location: Buskerud, Norway

Ljøtebotnberget is a mountain located in the municipality of Hol in Buskerud, Norway.
