= Blåbergi =

Mountain in Norway

Coordinates: 60°44′N 7°49′E

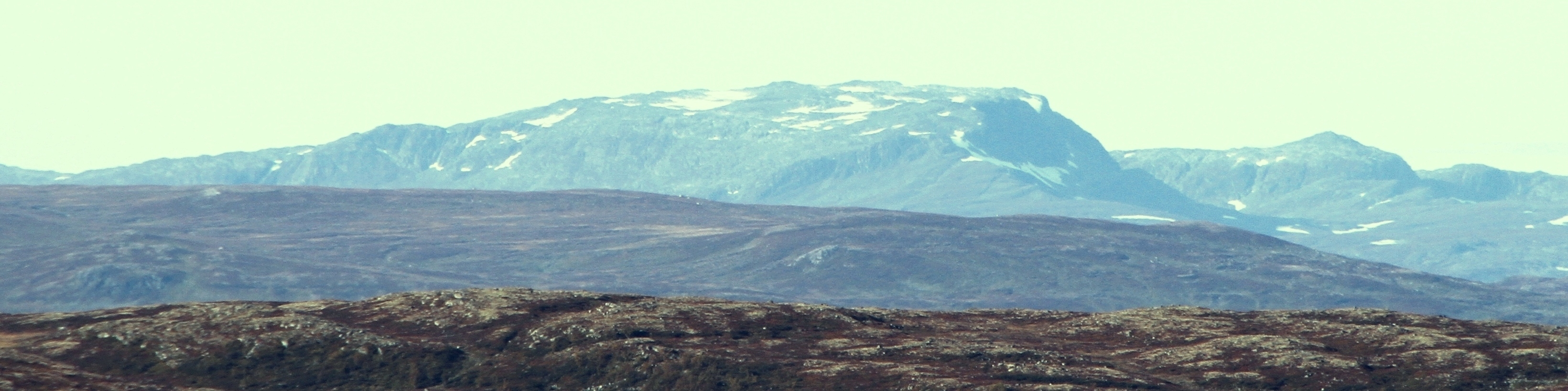

Highest point
- Elevation: 1,330 m (4,360 ft)
- Prominence: 362 m (1,188 ft)
- Isolation: 14.7 km (9.1 mi) to Folarskardnuten

Geography
- Location: Buskerud, Norway

Blåbergi is a mountain in the municipality of Hol in Buskerud county, Norway. It is south of Fossedalen, southeast of Fossebrea and southwest of Nuten.
