= Hol Bygdemuseum =

Open-air museum in Hagafoss, Norway

Coordinates: 60°35′50″N 8°20′59″E

Hol Bygdamuseum is an open-air museum located at the village of Hagafoss in Hol in Buskerud county, Norway.

Hol Bygdamuseum is a subsidiary of Hallingdal Museum, the regional folk museum for Buskerud. The museum is located in the traditional rural district of Hallingdal. The buildings at Hol Museum came from different parts of Hol municipality. The museum is designed as a farm dating from the 18th and 19th centuries. The museum consists of seventeen buildings, together with an exhibition featuring the distinct style of Rosemaling typical of Hallingdal. The museum also features local traditional dress.
