= Dagali =

Village in Hol municipality, Norway

Coordinates: 60°24′42″N 8°26′35″E

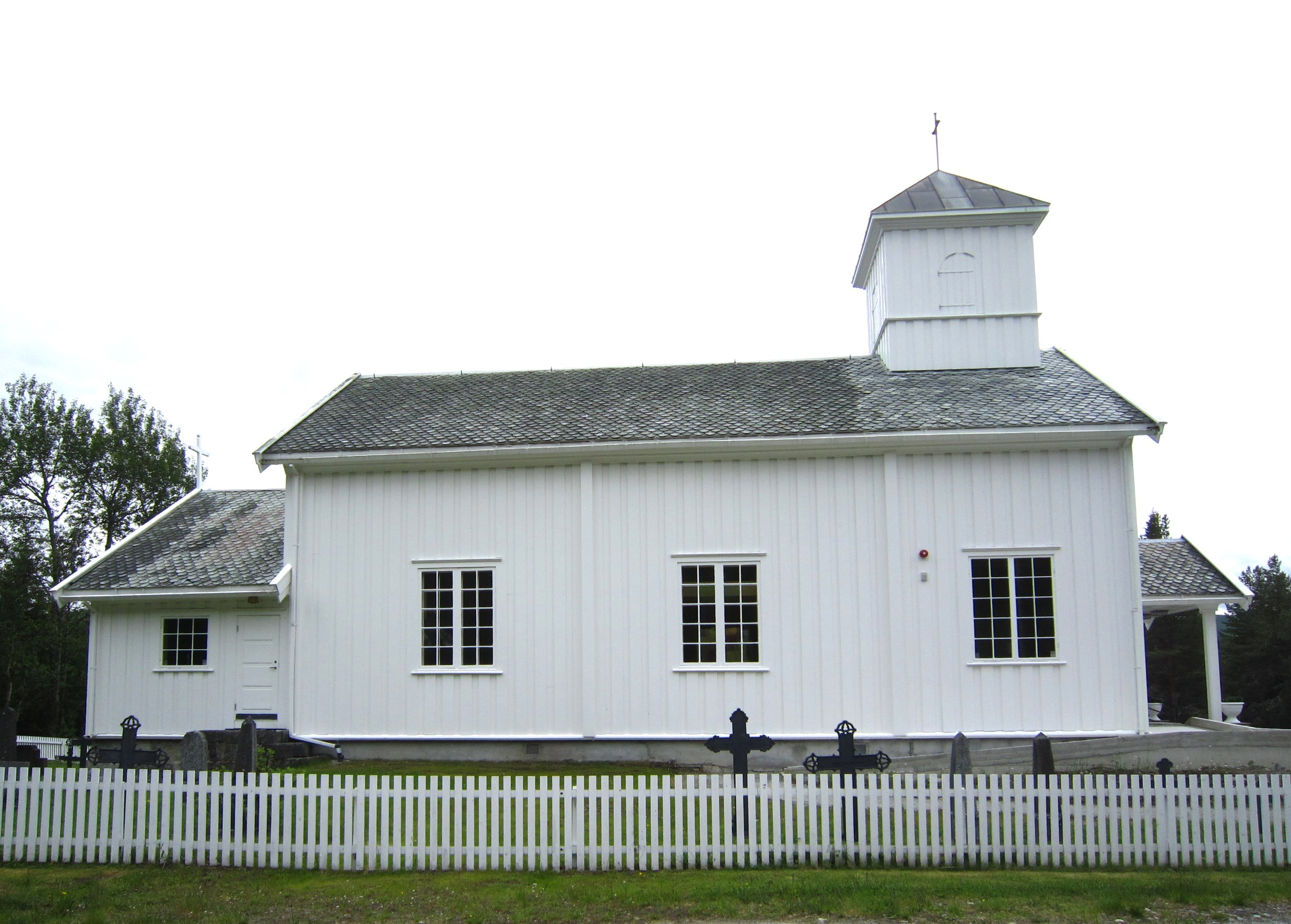
Dagali Church

Dagali is a small mountain village in Buskerud, Norway.

== Summary ==
Dagali is located in Hol municipality. The village stretches from Pålsbufjorden on the east to the border of the Hardangervidda National Park in the west, a distance of approximately 40 km. The river Numedalslågen runs through the village. Dagali had an airport, Geilo Airport, Dagali, that is no longer in use. The site is currently used by Dagali Opplevelser, which offers outdoor recreational activities including water rafting and snowmobiling.

Dagali Church (Dagali kirke) dates from 1850. The church was constructed of wood and has the seating capacity of around 200 people. Dagali church was rebuilt and restored during 1972–73. Dagali Church is located off Norwegian National Road Rv 40, about 25 kilometres from Geilo.

== Climate ==
Dagali features a subarctic climate (Köppen Dfc) with cold winters and somewhat cool summers. Precipitation is about 600 mm annually while summer is the wettest season.

Climate data for Dagali lufthavn 1991–2020 (798 m, average high/low 2003-2025)
Month	Jan	Feb	Mar	Apr	May	Jun	Jul	Aug	Sep	Oct	Nov	Dec	Year
Mean daily maximum °C (°F)	−3.8 (25.2)	−2 (28)	1.2 (34.2)	5.6 (42.1)	10.9 (51.6)	16.3 (61.3)	18.2 (64.8)	16.4 (61.5)	12.4 (54.3)	6.1 (43.0)	0.7 (33.3)	−2.8 (27.0)	6.6 (43.9)
Daily mean °C (°F)	−8.2 (17.2)	−7.8 (18.0)	−4.9 (23.2)	−0.1 (31.8)	5.1 (41.2)	9.4 (48.9)	12 (54)	10.4 (50.7)	6.5 (43.7)	1.1 (34.0)	−4 (25)	−7.8 (18.0)	1.0 (33.8)
Mean daily minimum °C (°F)	−14.5 (5.9)	−13.7 (7.3)	−10.5 (13.1)	−5.7 (21.7)	−1 (30)	3.2 (37.8)	5.6 (42.1)	4.6 (40.3)	1.8 (35.2)	−2.8 (27.0)	−7.9 (17.8)	−12.5 (9.5)	−4.4 (24.0)
Source 1: yr.no (mean)
Source 2: Seklima (average high/low)

Climate data for Dagali-Fagerlund 1961-1990, extremes 1885-2015
Month	Jan	Feb	Mar	Apr	May	Jun	Jul	Aug	Sep	Oct	Nov	Dec	Year
Record high °C (°F)	7.5 (45.5)	7.4 (45.3)	8.5 (47.3)	13.6 (56.5)	21.0 (69.8)	26.3 (79.3)	27.5 (81.5)	28.0 (82.4)	23.0 (73.4)	20.8 (69.4)	10.0 (50.0)	7.2 (45.0)	28.0 (82.4)
Mean daily maximum °C (°F)	−5.2 (22.6)	−3.7 (25.3)	−1.0 (30.2)	3.0 (37.4)	9.2 (48.6)	14.5 (58.1)	15.7 (60.3)	14.8 (58.6)	10.2 (50.4)	5.6 (42.1)	−0.7 (30.7)	−3.6 (25.5)	4.9 (40.8)
Mean daily minimum °C (°F)	−12.6 (9.3)	−12.3 (9.9)	−9.8 (14.4)	−5.6 (21.9)	0.2 (32.4)	4.5 (40.1)	6.0 (42.8)	5.4 (41.7)	2.4 (36.3)	−0.9 (30.4)	−7.3 (18.9)	−10.7 (12.7)	−3.4 (25.9)
Record low °C (°F)	−39.0 (−38.2)	−30.3 (−22.5)	−28.6 (−19.5)	−21.0 (−5.8)	−13.6 (7.5)	−5.2 (22.6)	−1.0 (30.2)	−4.1 (24.6)	−7.9 (17.8)	−17.3 (0.9)	−25.9 (−14.6)	−34.0 (−29.2)	−39.0 (−38.2)
Average precipitation mm (inches)	33 (1.3)	23 (0.9)	27 (1.1)	23 (0.9)	37 (1.5)	54 (2.1)	69 (2.7)	65 (2.6)	51 (2.0)	53 (2.1)	42 (1.7)	38 (1.5)	515 (20.4)
Average precipitation days	8.9	5.8	7.2	6.0	7.3	9.4	11.2	10.4	9.3	9.7	9.5	9.2	103.9
Source: Met Norway Eklima
