= Hagafoss =

Village in Buskerud, Norway

Coordinates: 60°35′52″N 8°20′47″E

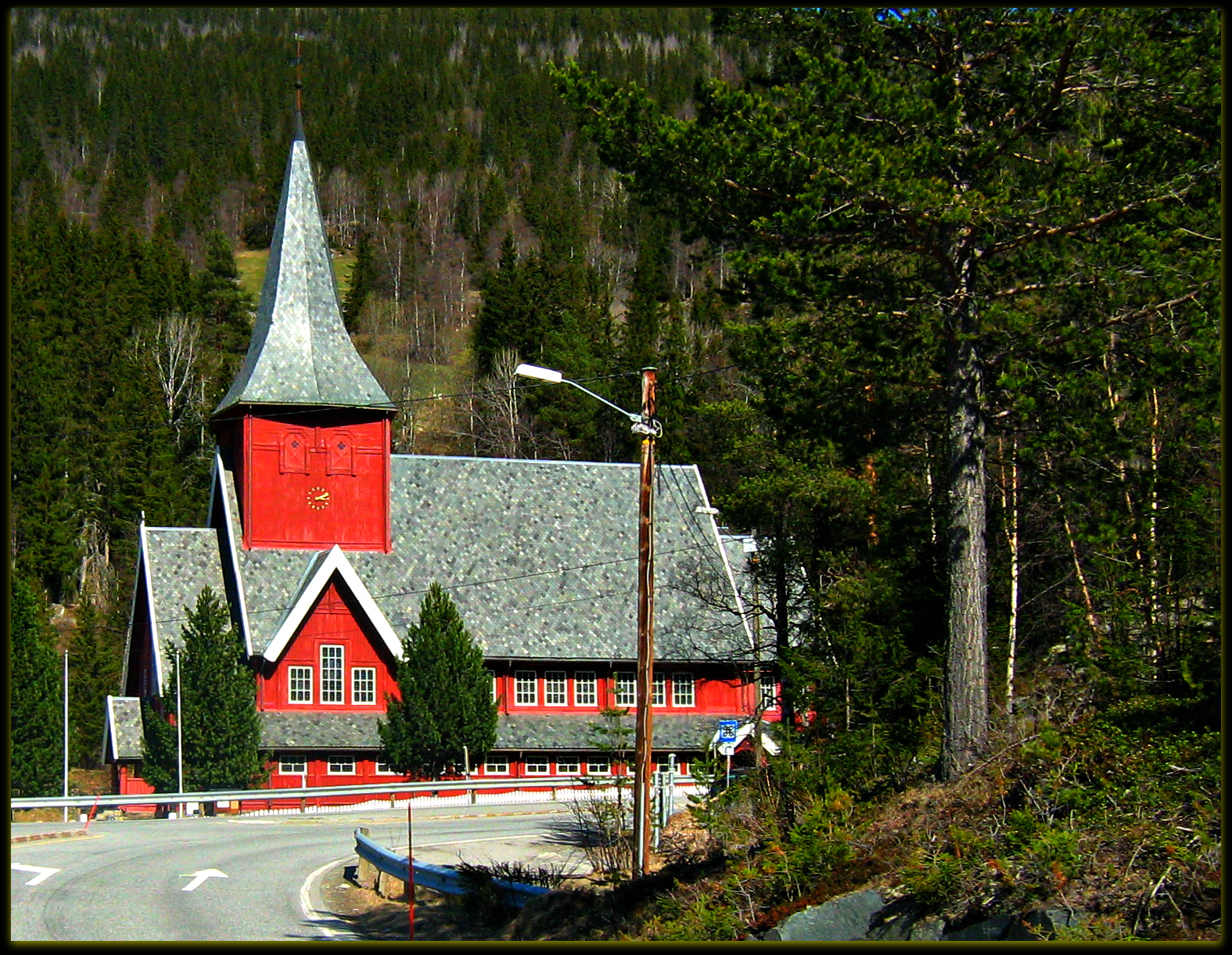
Hol Church in Hagafoss

Hagafoss is a small village in Hol Municipality in Buskerud county, Norway.

Hagafoss is located in upper Hallingdal where the road branches off towards Aurland Municipality along Norwegian county road 50 (Fv50). The main tourist attraction in the village is Hol Bygdemuseum, an open-air museum founded in 1914, and now part of the Buskerud Museum.

Hol Church (Hol kyrkje) is located in Hagafoss. The church was constructed of wood during 1924 and has 400 seats. The architect was Ole Eriksen Stein (1867-1950).
