= Ustevatn =

Reservoir in Norway

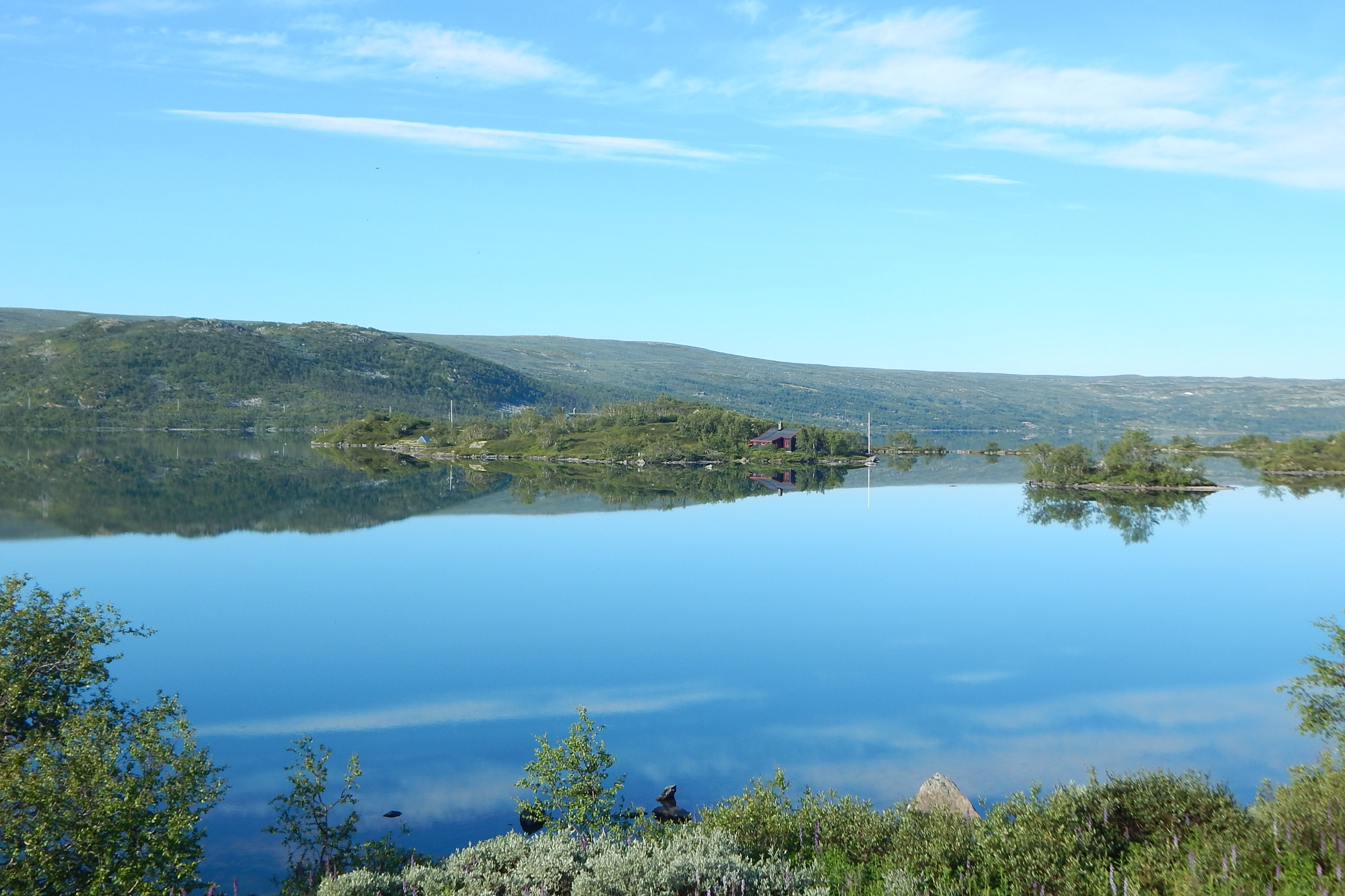

- Location within Norway
- Location: Hol (Buskerud)
- Coordinates: 60°29′6″N 8°0′46″E
- Basin countries: Norway
- Surface area: 12.40 km^{2} (4.79 sq mi)
- Shore length^{1}: 31.26 km (19.42 mi)
- Surface elevation: 985 m (3,232 ft)
- References: NVE
- ^{1} Shore length is not a well-defined measure.

Ustevatn is a lake in the municipality of Hol in Buskerud, Norway. The main inflow is on the west side of the lake provided by Ustekveikja, which originates from the area around Finse in Hordaland. Norwegian National Road 7 runs along the north side of the lake. Bergen line railway has stations at Ustaoset and Haugastøl.

== See also ==
- List of lakes in Norway
