= Hol, Norway =

Hol Municipality Hol kommune
- Municipality
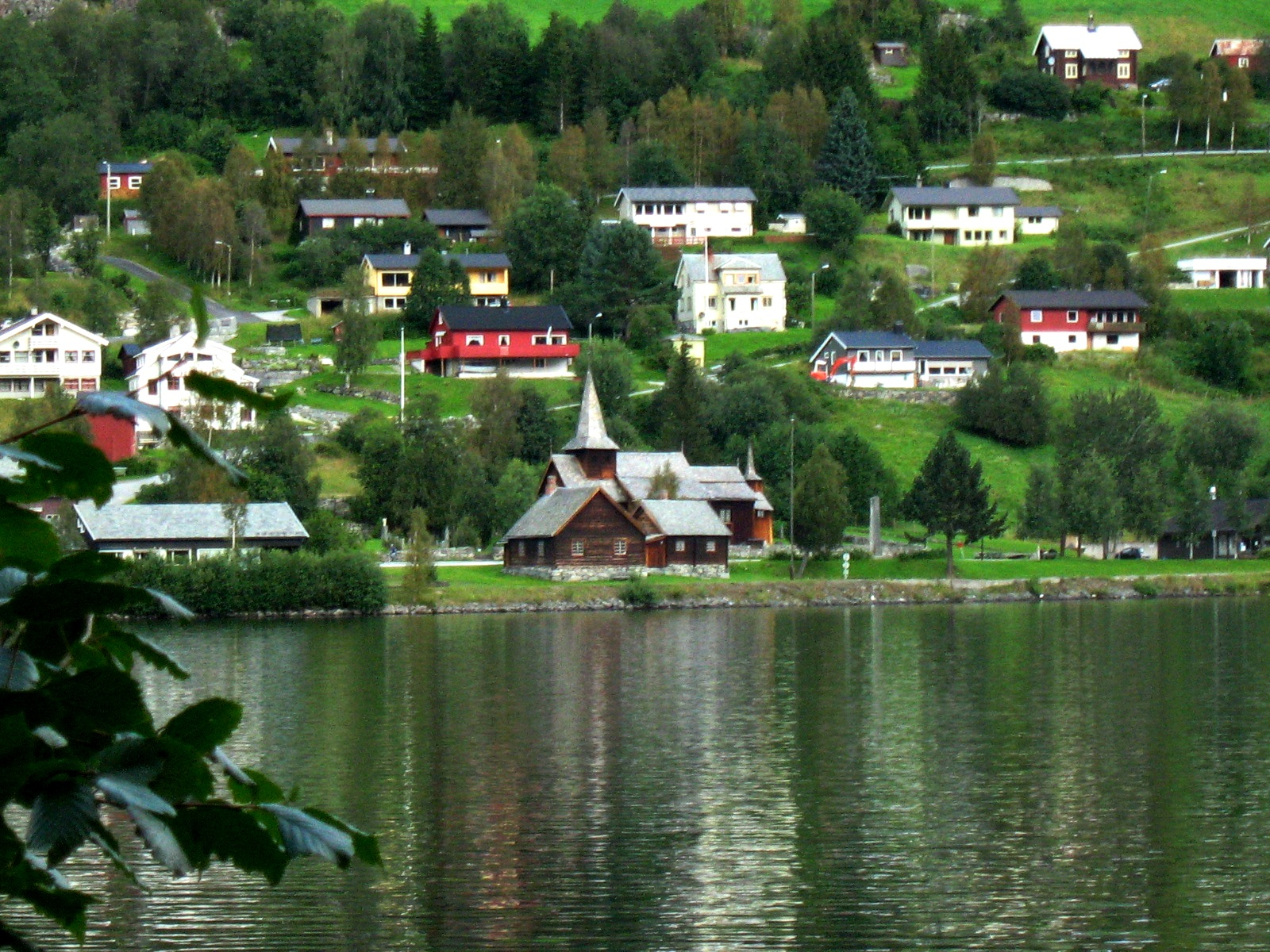

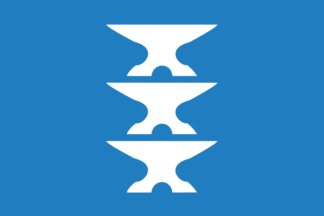
- Flag Coat of arms

- Buskerud within Norway

- Hol within Buskerud
- Coordinates: 60°34′18″N 8°4′18″E
- Country: Norway
- County: Buskerud
- District: Hallingdal
- Administrative centre: Hol

Government
  - Mayor (2003): Erik Kaupang (Ap)

Area
  - Total: 1,858 km^{2} (717 sq mi)
  - Land: 1,664 km^{2} (642 sq mi)
  - Rank: #36 in Norway

Population (2003)
  - Total: 4,556
  - Rank: #211 in Norway
  - Density: 3/km^{2} (7.8/sq mi)
  - Change (10 years): ▼ −1.5%
- Demonym: Holing

Official language
  - Norwegian form: Neutral
- Time zone: UTC+01:00 (CET)
  - Summer (DST): UTC+02:00 (CEST)
- ISO 3166 code: NO-3330
- Website: Official website

Hol is a municipality in Buskerud county, Norway.

== Administrative history ==
The area of Hol was separated from Ål Municipality in 1877 to become a separate municipality. In 1937 a part of neighboring Uvdal Municipality with 220 inhabitants moved to Hol Municipality. The area was transferred from Uvdal to Hol in 1944. Uvdal was reunited with Nore to form the new municipality of Nore og Uvdal Municipality.

Number of minorities (1st and 2nd generation) in Hol by country of origin in 2017
Ancestry	Number
Poland	177
Denmark	70
Sweden	65
Lithuania	43
Iceland	37

== General information ==
=== Name ===
The municipality (originally the parish) is named after the old Hol farm (Old Norse: Hóll), since the first church was built here. The name is identical with the word hóll, which means 'round (and isolated) hill'.

=== Villages and hamlets in Hol municipality ===
- Dagali
- Geilo
- Hagafoss
- Hol
- Hovet
- Kvisla
- Myrland
- Strønde
- Sudndalen
- Vedalen

== Geography ==
Hol is bordered to the north by Lærdal Municipality (in Vestland county), to the north and east by Ål Municipality, to the south by Nore og Uvdal Municipality, and to the west by Eidfjord Municipality, Ulvik Municipality and Aurland Municipality (all in Vestland county).

=== Climate ===
Climate data for Geilo - Oldebråten 1991-2020 (772 m, avg high/low 2007-2025)
Month	Jan	Feb	Mar	Apr	May	Jun	Jul	Aug	Sep	Oct	Nov	Dec	Year
Mean daily maximum °C (°F)	−2.9 (26.8)	−1.4 (29.5)	1.7 (35.1)	5.4 (41.7)	10.8 (51.4)	16.3 (61.3)	18.3 (64.9)	16.5 (61.7)	12.6 (54.7)	6.4 (43.5)	1 (34)	−2.1 (28.2)	6.9 (44.4)
Daily mean °C (°F)	−6.2 (20.8)	−6 (21)	−3.6 (25.5)	0.5 (32.9)	5.5 (41.9)	9.9 (49.8)	12.4 (54.3)	11.1 (52.0)	7.4 (45.3)	1.9 (35.4)	−2.8 (27.0)	−5.6 (21.9)	2.0 (35.7)
Mean daily minimum °C (°F)	−11.2 (11.8)	−10.6 (12.9)	−7.3 (18.9)	−3.8 (25.2)	1 (34)	5.2 (41.4)	7.4 (45.3)	6.4 (43.5)	3.7 (38.7)	−0.7 (30.7)	−5.7 (21.7)	−9.9 (14.2)	−2.1 (28.2)
Average precipitation mm (inches)	64 (2.5)	42 (1.7)	40 (1.6)	37 (1.5)	45 (1.8)	62 (2.4)	80 (3.1)	82 (3.2)	61 (2.4)	66 (2.6)	63 (2.5)	56 (2.2)	698 (27.5)
Source 1: seklima.no = eklima>
Source 2: yr.no (precipitation)

Climate data for Dagali lufthavn 1991–2020 (798 m, average high/low 2003-2025)
Month	Jan	Feb	Mar	Apr	May	Jun	Jul	Aug	Sep	Oct	Nov	Dec	Year
Mean daily maximum °C (°F)	−3.8 (25.2)	−2 (28)	1.2 (34.2)	5.6 (42.1)	10.9 (51.6)	16.3 (61.3)	18.2 (64.8)	16.4 (61.5)	12.4 (54.3)	6.1 (43.0)	0.7 (33.3)	−2.8 (27.0)	6.6 (43.9)
Daily mean °C (°F)	−8.2 (17.2)	−7.8 (18.0)	−4.9 (23.2)	−0.1 (31.8)	5.1 (41.2)	9.4 (48.9)	12 (54)	10.4 (50.7)	6.5 (43.7)	1.1 (34.0)	−4 (25)	−7.8 (18.0)	1.0 (33.8)
Mean daily minimum °C (°F)	−14.5 (5.9)	−13.7 (7.3)	−10.5 (13.1)	−5.7 (21.7)	−1 (30)	3.2 (37.8)	5.6 (42.1)	4.6 (40.3)	1.8 (35.2)	−2.8 (27.0)	−7.9 (17.8)	−12.5 (9.5)	−4.4 (24.0)
Source 1: yr.no (mean)
Source 2: Seklima (average high/low)

=== Lakes ===
- Ustevatn – in the municipality of Hol
- Nygardsvatnet – in the municipality of Hol
- Strandavatnet – in the municipality of Hol
- Ørteren – in the municipality of Hol
- Nyhellervatnet – on the border between Hol and Aurland, Vestland county
- Pålsbufjorden – in the municipalities of Hol and Nore og Uvdal
- Øvre Hein – in the municipalities of Hol and Nore og Uvdal
- Djupsvatnet – in the municipalities of Hol and Ål
- Flakavatnet – in the municipalities of Hol and Ulvik (in Vestland county)

=== Mountains ===
- Galdene
- Haldalshøgdi
- Julsennosi
- Kyrkjedørsnuten
- Miljonuten
- Storefjellsnuten

== Coat of arms ==
The coat of arms of Hol is from modern times; the arms were granted on 5 July 1991. They show three silver anvils on a blue background and were designed by Trond Andersson. The three anvils are stacked one above the other, with the top one being largest and the bottom one smallest. The anvil was chosen to symbolize the former smithies in the municipality, which were famous for the production of axes, blades, and knives. Iron mining was already practiced in the area in the Viking Age.

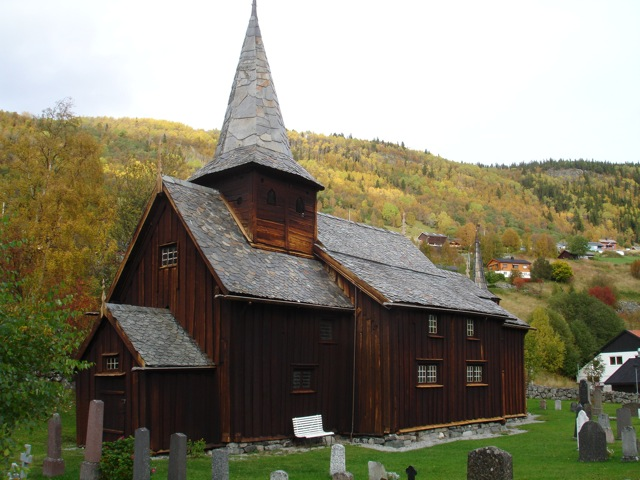
Hol Church

== Notable residents ==
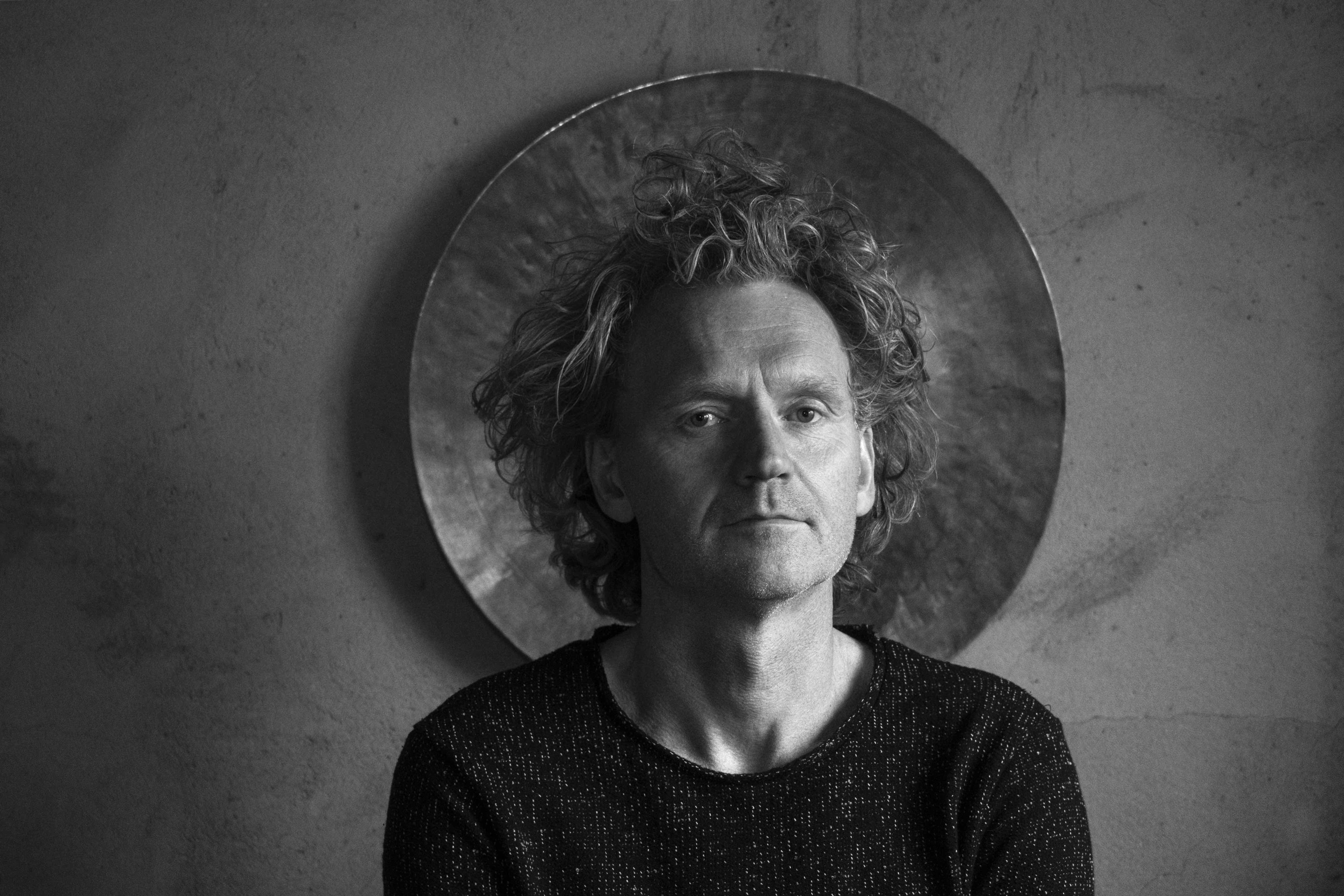
Photo of Terje Isungset taken by Knut Bry 2015

=== In sport ===
- Margit Hvammen (1932 in Geilo – 2010) alpine skier
- Aud Hvammen (born 1943 in Geilo), alpine skier
- Anne Brusletto (born 1951 in Geilo), alpine skier
- Martin Hole (born 1959), former cross country runner
- Ådne Søndrål (born 1971), former speed skater and gold medallist at the 1998 Winter Olympics
- Håvard Bøkko (born 1987 in Hovet), speed skater
- Roger S. Kleivdal (born 1988), snowboarder
- Christoffer Fagerli Rukke (born 1988), speed skater
- Hege Bøkko (born 1991 in Hovet), speed skater
- Vetle Sjåstad Christiansen (born 1992 in Geilo), biathlete
- Tiril Sjåstad Christiansen (born 1995 in Geilo), freestyle skier

=== Other people ===
- Knut Henriksen Dybsjord (1809–1866), mayor and temperance movement activist
- Pål Olson Grøt (1813–1906), Rosemåling painter
- Olav Sletto (1886–1963), novelist and educator
- no:Magne Myhren (1937–2015), folk musician and philologist
- Knut Bry (born 1946 in Hovet), fine-art photographer and film director
- Terje Isungset (born 1964), musician, percussionist and composer

== Attractions ==
- Hallingskarvet National Park – national park in the municipalities of Hol (Buskerud), Ulvik (Hordaland) and Aurland (Sogn og Fjordane)
- Hol Bygdemuseum – located along the road from Ål to Geilo in the small village of Hagafoss. The museum is built as an old farm (holingsgard) with buildings of the local type. There are a total of 17 buildings, of which two, Nestegardsstugu and Raunsgardsstugu, have decorative wall paintings on the walls.
- Dagali Museum – museum with ten buildings located in the middle of Dagali, on the edge of Hardangervidda. The buildings came from Dagali, Skurdalen, Tunhovd, and Uvdal; the oldest dates to the 18th century.
- Dagali Skisenter – alpine resort in Dagali, also offering sled-racing, with one of Norway's longest sled-racing hills.
- Dr Holms Hotel – resort hotel in the ski resort town of Geilo

== Sister cities ==
The following cities are twinned with Hol:

- – Halinga Parish, Pärnu County, Estonia
- – Mäntyharju, South Savo, Finland
- – Säffle, Värmland County, Sweden

== Gallery ==
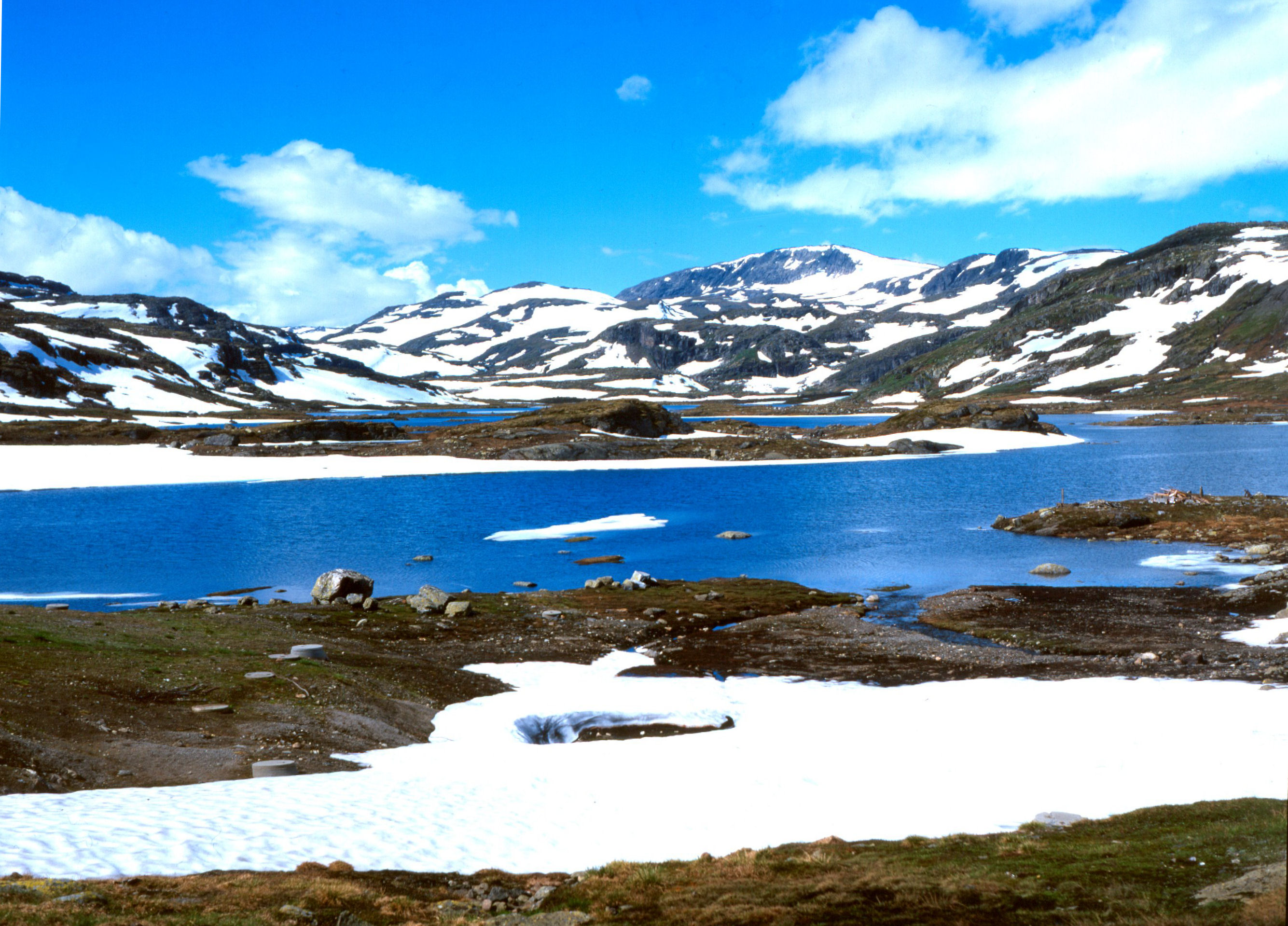
Lake Geiteryggen

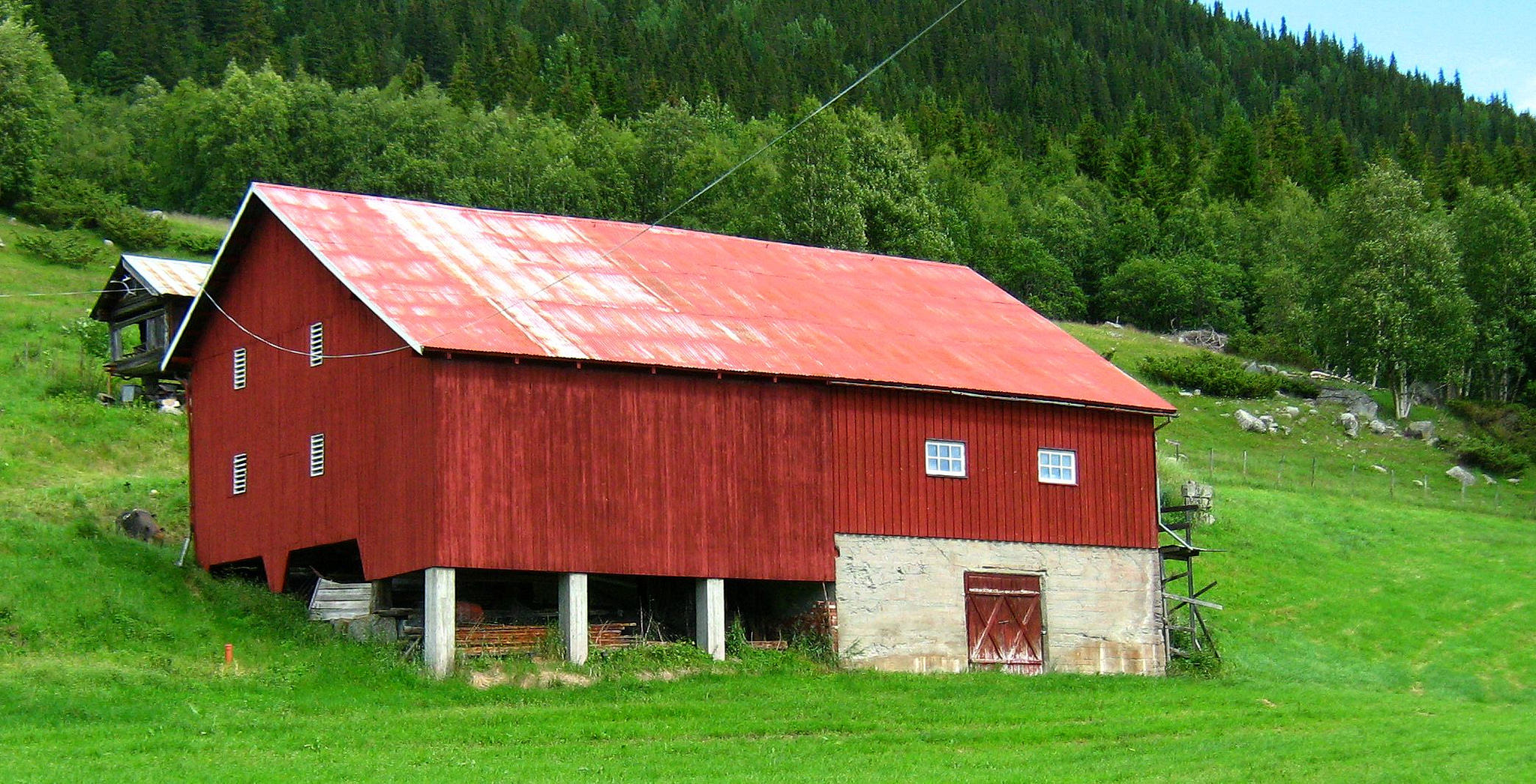
Traditionally built farm in Hol

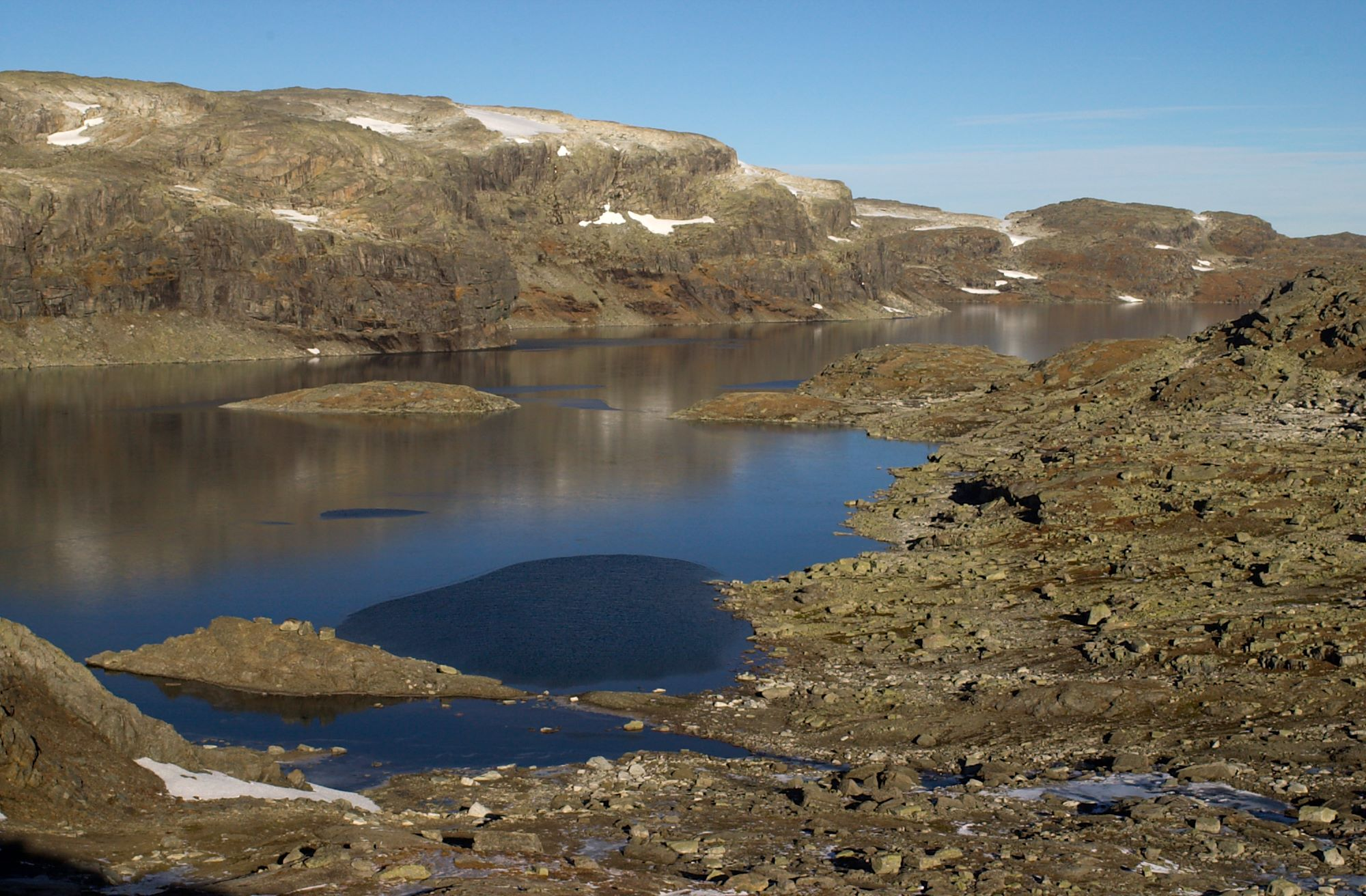
Lake Flakavatn

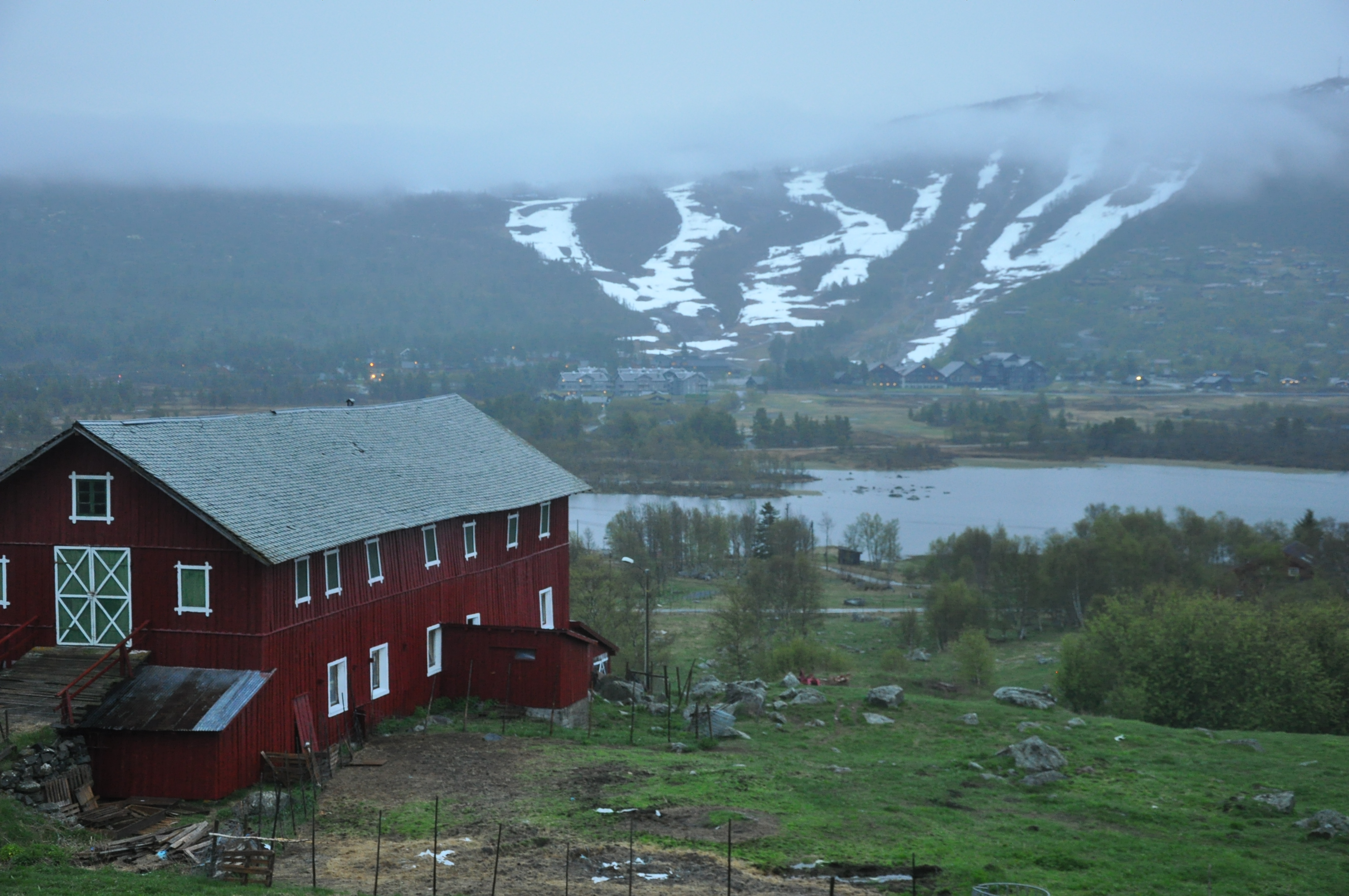
Geilo

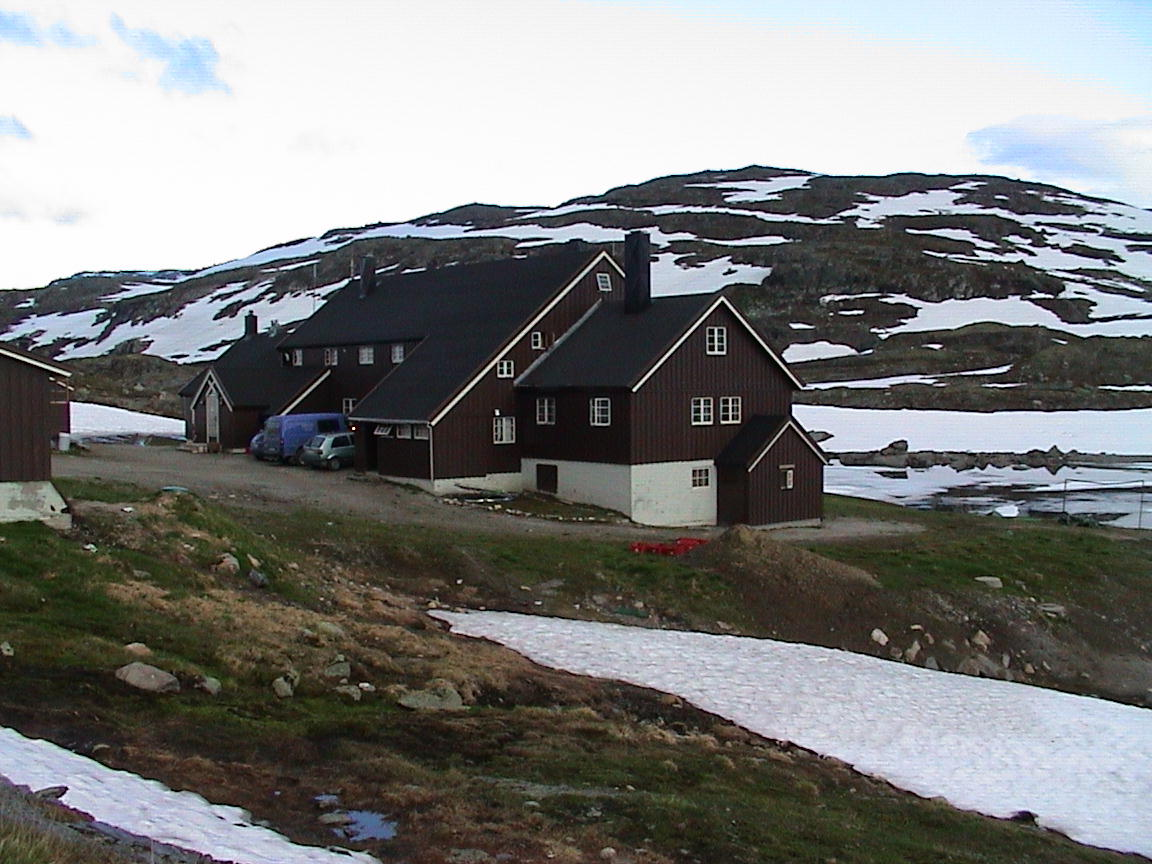
Geiteryggen

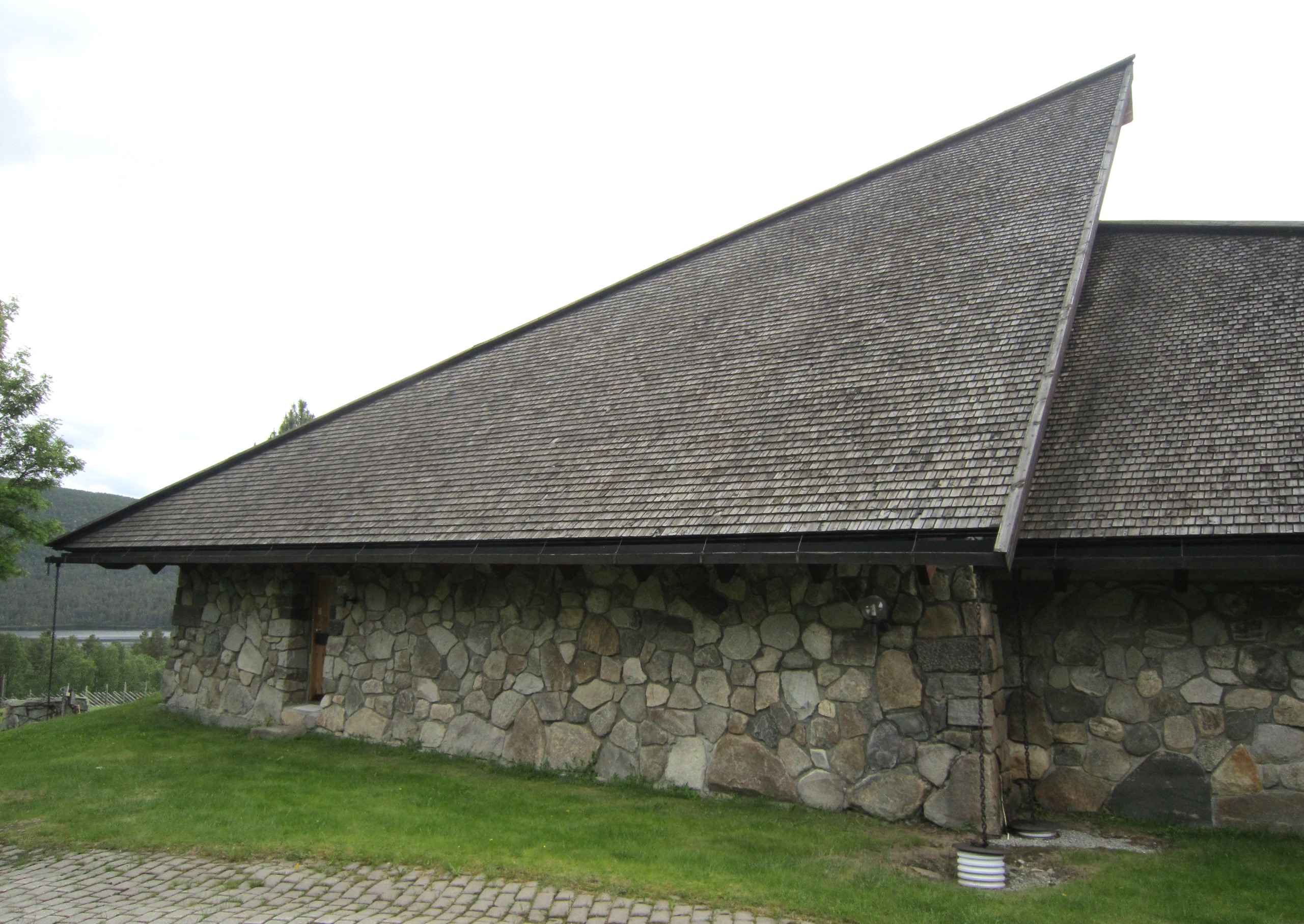
Skurdalen Church (Skurdalskyrkja)

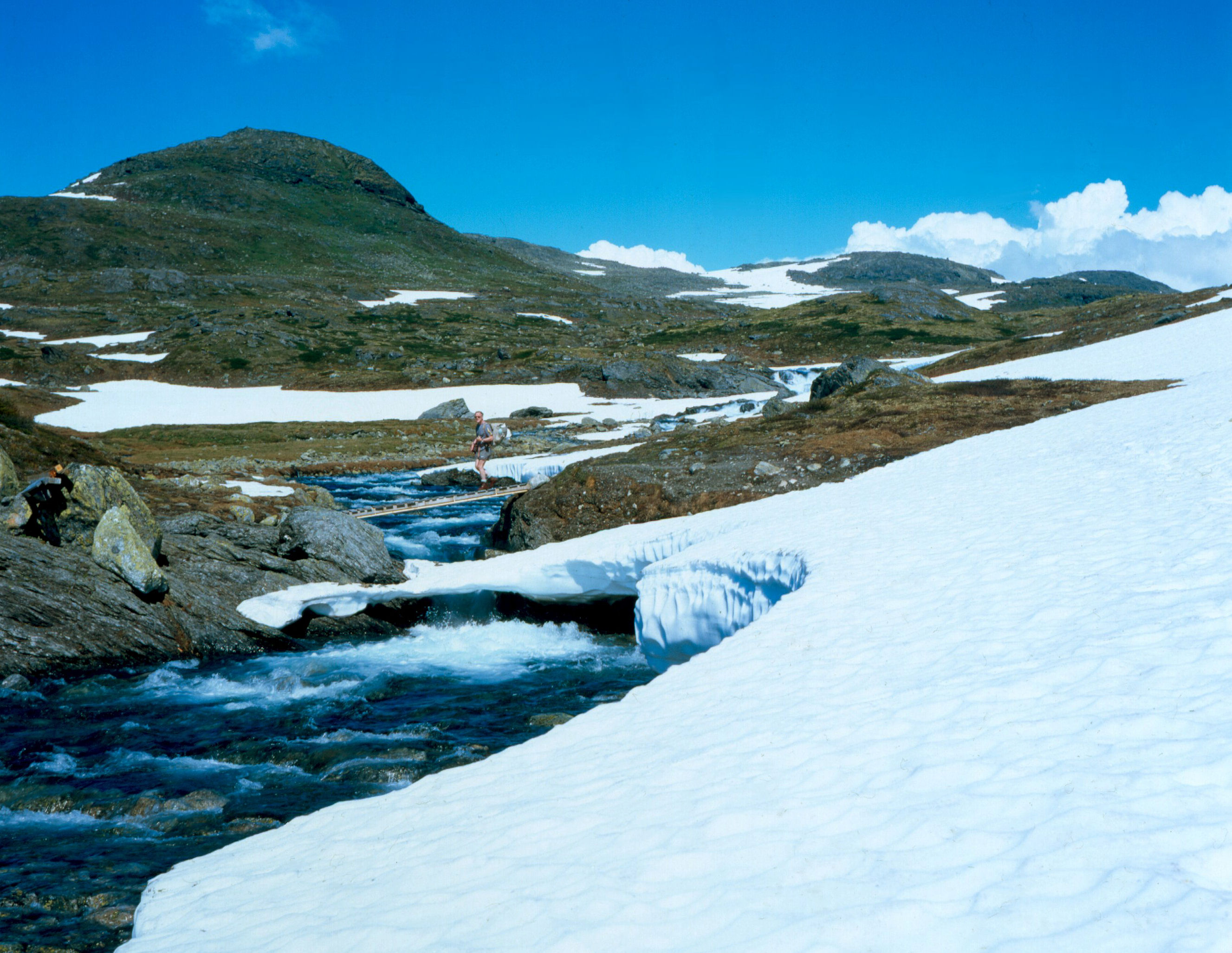
Rossdøla River

== See also ==
- 1980 Winter Paralympics
- Blåbergi
- Ljøtebotnberget
