= Lordehytta =

Stone hut on Folarskardet mountain in Norway

Coordinates: 60.605592°N 7.800636°E

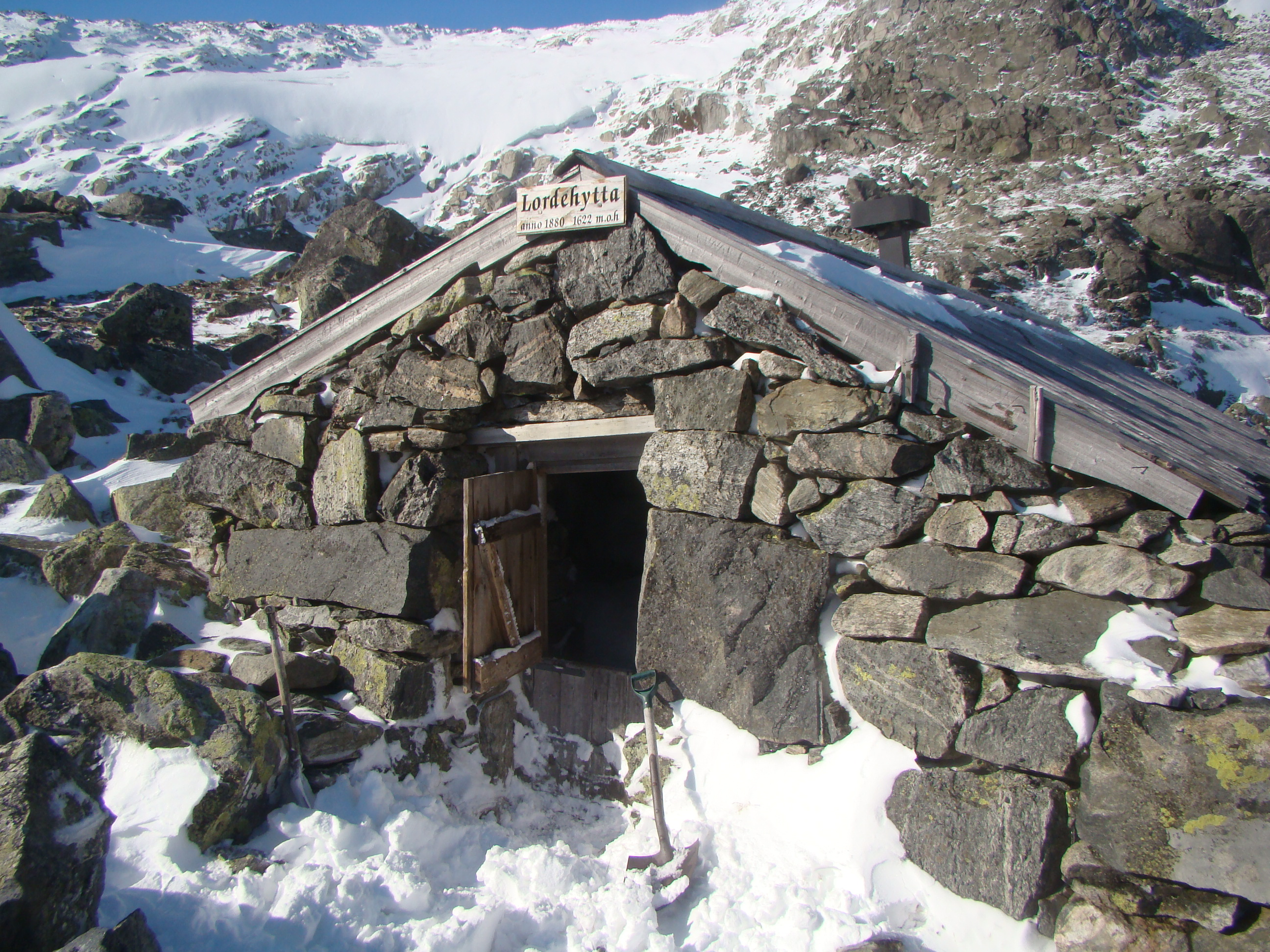
Lordehytta in winter

Lordehytta (Lord Hut) is a stone mountain hut on Folarskardet in Hallingskarvet in Norway. It is the only cabin on the mountain and was built around 1880 by the younger Lord Garvagh.

The cabin is located at 1,620 meters above sea level. It is only accessible on foot, and is about 3 hours' journey from Haugastøl or Raggsteindalen. The cabin is a larger version of a herder's summer shelter in the mountains and consists of two rooms: an outer storeroom for firewood, food, and equipment and an inner room with a fireplace. It is used both as a destination and as an emergency shelter. The cabin was completely renovated in 1990.

== History ==
The cabin was built around 1880 by Lord Garvagh, who wrote a book about the Norwegian mountains; his father had previously hunted reindeer in the area. It was probably the first vacation cabin. Father and son are credited with building about nine other "lord huts", of which the one on Flatnosi is also still usable. The hut on Folarskardet was built with the help of Lars Lein of Hovet in Sudndalen, a skilled hunter whom he had met on his first hunting trip in the area. Lord Garvagh had some unusual ideas; among others, that all wood should be carried up to the hut and not chopped or split there.
