= Extreme triathlon =

Sport competition in extreme conditions

Xtreme triathlon (or extreme triathlon) is a type of triathlon competition on extreme courses, which include night or cold swims, and important elevation gain and high altitude during both the cycling and running sections. Athletes also deal with extreme weather conditions due to the remote locations and altitude changes.

The number of participants is limited (usually to 250 to 300) and some races operate a ballot entry system. These small numbers allow races to be held in remote and inaccessible locations, one of many characteristics of extreme triathlon. Some races are "unsupported" so competitors need to have personal back up crews that support to provide them with food, drinks and other necessities. The support crews also often need to accompany their competitor on any potentially dangerous mountain sections. During these sections, competitors are often required to carry a backpack containing emergency food and clothing should the weather change.

== History ==
The roots of extreme triathlon trace back to the Norseman Triathlon, first held in 2003 in Norway. Designed by Hårek Stranheim, Norseman offers a cold-water fjord swim of ~3.8 km, a 180 km bike leg through the Hardangervidda plateau, and a 42.2 km marathon ending atop Gaustatoppen. With over 5,000 m of total elevation, it emphasises self-reliance and endurance. Participation is capped (≈250 athletes), each required to bring a personal support crew for safety and logistics.

Inspired by Norseman, similar races began to appear in Europe in the late 2000s and early 2010s. Altriman (France, 2009), Aurlandsfjellet Xtreme (Norway, 2010), and Oravaman (Slovakia, 2011) adopted similar formats, favouring elevation, remote terrain, and small-scale organization. Between 2012 and 2013, additional events launched such as Celtman Xtreme Triathlon (UK), The Brutal Extreme Triathlon (UK), Swissman Xtreme Triathlon (Switzerland), Jurassicman (UK), and Snæfellsnes Jarnkarl (Iceland). These races emphasised community focus, athlete-crewed support, and wilderness routes.

AlpsMan Extreme Triathlon, held annually since 2016 near Lake Annecy in France, includes a ~3.8 km lake swim, 180 km cycling across multiple alpine cols (~4,300 m ascent), and a marathon run climbing to the summit of Semnoz (~1,300 m ascent).

In 2013, Norseman, Celtman, and Swissman formed an informal alliance, which eventually evolved into the commercial race circuit XTRI World Tour. The first XTRI World Championship took place at Norseman in 2019. While the Tour has helped raise the profile of select events, many races remain outside its framework. Some participants and commentators have criticised the Tour’s branded experience and over-commercialisation. XTRI World Tour is a trademarked commercial race network, rather than a governing body for the discipline.

As of the mid-2020s, over 45 independent extreme triathlons exist worldwide. Notable events include Austria eXtreme Triathlon, StoneBrixiaMan (Italy), Winterman (Czech Republic), Knysna Extreme (South Africa), and AlpsMan (France), each emphasizing uniquely local terrain and low-capacity fields.

Norseman remains considered the symbolic founding event. In 2025, over 6,300 applicants from roughly 96 countries entered the lottery for ~250 slots, demonstrating sustained demand far beyond its limited capacity. Despite the rise of branded series and media coverage, the core ethos of extreme triathlon continues to revolve around self-supported endurance amid challenging natural settings.

== Course format ==
Extreme triathlons follow the traditional Iron-distance (3.8 km swim, 180 km bike, 42.2 km run) but are held in remote and often mountainous environments. Courses are typically point-to-point and feature cold-water swims in fjords, rivers, or alpine lakes, steep climbs during the bike segment, and trail runs that may finish at altitude. These environmental and elevation factors significantly increase the difficulty compared to standard triathlon formats.

Many races require athletes to be accompanied by a personal support crew, who provide nutrition, equipment, and safety support—especially on remote run sections. However, not all events have this requirement; some are self-supported or offer partial aid stations.

Field sizes are usually limited to a few hundred participants, often selected through an application or lottery process. This allows organizers to maintain safety, protect natural environments, and preserve the event’s emphasis on personal endurance and self-reliance.

== Global Extreme Triathlon ==
In December 2019, the independent Global Extreme Triathlon Forum was established on Facebook to provide a common online community for athletes, race organisers, supporters and volunteers involved in extreme triathlon. The initiative later expanded to include the Global Extreme Triathlon Club on Strava and, in 2023, the Global Extreme Triathlon website.

Global Extreme Triathlon is an independent, volunteer-run initiative that maintains a global race calendar and directory covering events affiliated with the XTRI World Tour, the Extreme Triathlon Series and independent race organisers. The platform also publishes guides for athletes and supporters, shares news about extreme triathlon events, and provides information for race organisers. The group is not a governing body, nor an established race organiser, but an information portal for athletes.

== XTRI World Championship ==
The XTRI World Championship is an annual event that takes place at Norseman every August. The first championship took place in 2019 with less than 50 athletes starting in a small field before the main race. The entire field of Norseman is now the World Championship.

The international governing body World Triathlon does not recognize any XTRI World Tour Championships as official Xtreme Triathlon World Championships.

The current XTRI World Championship Rankings for 2025 are as follows:

Women:

1. Julia Skala (GER)
2. Laura Kessler (CH)
3. Flora Colledge (GBR)

Men:

1. Kristian Grue (NOR)
2. Christophe Martiniger (CH)
3. Juuso Manninen (FIN)

Starting in 2025, the XTRI Solo Point Five World Championship will be held annually at a different SP5 race location each year.

== Race catalogues ==
=== Active race catalogue ===
Race	Status	Distance	Org	Ascents (mtrs)	Country	Extras / Mythical feature(s)	Established	Notes	World Championship Qualifier
Alps Man	Active	Full	Independent	5600	France	"Le Tournant" Bell High Route Cutoff	2016		
Alps Man half	Active	Half	Independent	3200	France		2016		
Altriman	Active	Full	Independent	6320	France	Port de Pailhères (12km @ 9%)	2015?		
Amazigh XTRI	Active	Full	XTRI World Tour Prospect	2930	Morocco		2023		
Austria eXtreme	Active	Full	Extreme Triathlon Series	5786	Austria	Styrian snowfield run	2015		
Aurlandsfjellet	Active	Half	Independent	4200	Norway		2011		
Bearman XXL	Active	Full	Independent	6175	France	Bear Chair finish photo.	2017	8848m option for Bears.	
Ben Nevis Braveheart	Active	Half	Independent	1970	Scotland	Highest summit in UK.	2017		
Blacklake XTRI	Active	Full	XTRI World Tour	5800	Montenegro	Immortals Wall, 2 lake swim, bike over Worlds 2nd deepest gorge.	2019		YES
Brutal	Active	Full	Independent	4350	Wales	They do multiples!	2012		
Canadaman XTRI	Active	Full,1/2	XTRI World Tour	4000	Canada	Mt Megantic Observatory finish	2017		YES
CELTMAN! XTRI	Active	Full	XTRI World Tour	3769	Scotland	Cold jellyfish swim, Beinn Eighe Ridge	2012		YES
Cheaha	First 2022	Full	Independent	4570	USA, Alabama	Mt. Cheaha "The High Place"	2022	New race, launching 2022.	
Diablak Beskid	Active	Full,1/2	Independent	6200	Poland				
EagleXMan	Active	Full	Independent	6300	Italy	Gran Sasso e Monti; Campo Imperatore	2021		
EagleXMan half	Active	half	Independent	3300	Italy	Gran Sasso e Monti; Campo Imperatore	2021		
Estonian Forest	Active	Full, 1/2	Independent	2600	Estonia	180km Gravel/MTB bike (flat country!)	2021		
Evergreen	TBC	Full	Independent	7850	France	Chamonix Skyline	2015		
Fodaxman XTRI	Active	Full	XTRI World Tour	4700	Brazil	Serra do Rio do Rastro switchbacks	2019		YES
Formosa XTRI	Active	Full	XTRI World Tour	6840	Taiwan		2019		YES
Greek Hero	Active	Full	XTRI World Tour Prospect	3900	Greece		2020		
Grimm Extreme	Active	Full	Independent	c4000	Germany	Cross old Iron Curtain	2020		
Grizzlyman	Active	Full	Independent	6300	Czech	205km bike	2019		
HardaSuka Ultimate	Active	Full	Independent	8000	Poland				
HelveticMan	Active	Half	Independent	4150	Switzerland				
HimalayanXtri	First 2022	Full	XTRI World Tour Prospect	6200	Nepal	4000m highest altitude	2021		
ICON XTRI	Active	Full	XTRI World Tour	6200	Italy	High altitude swim (1.800 MSL). Stelvio Bike	2017		YES
Inferno	Active	4 stage	Independent	5500	Switzerland				
Janosik XTRI	Active	Full	XTRI World Tour	5800	Slovakia	Midnight swim, Rozstuec climb on run	2016		YES
Jurassicman	Active	Full	Indi	3720	England		2013		
Karakoram	First 2022	Full	Independent	2900	Pakistan	7-8c (2km) swim at 2250m altitude			
Kiwiman	Active	Full	Independent	4200	New Zealand				
Knysna Xtreme	Active	Full	Extreme Triathlon Series	3360	South Africa	Longest extreme tri swim & run			
Lofoten	Active	Full	Independent	4100	Norway	Most northerly extreme tri. Svolvear Harbour swim.			
ManX	Active	Full	Independent	?	Isle of Man		2019		
Mercantourman	Active	Full	Independent	7300	France		2020	Same area as Cairoman, may be rename?	
Norseman XTRI	Active	Full	XTRI World Tour	5235	Norway	It's Norseman! Ferry jump. Zombie Hill.	2003		HOST
Olympos-X	Active	Full	Independent	7050	Greece	Night swim, 4km off the coast to 2834m altitude. 3000m elevation loss through technical trails	2017		
Olympos-X half	Active	Half	Independent	3700	Greece	highest half, extreme downhill	2020		
Olympusman	Active	Half	Independent	2916	Cyprus	Cyprus highest peak			
Extreme Olympusman	Active	Full	Independent	6000	Cyprus			Full distance test event 2020.	
Oravaman	Active	Half	Independent	2550	Slovakia				
Patagonman Xtreme	Active	Full	Independent	3182	Chile	Ferry jump. Finish Bell.	2018		
Pirene Xtreme	Active	Full	Extreme Triathlon Series	6500	Spain	Discover the Pyrenees	2017		
Pulpit Rock Xtreme Triathlon	Active	Half	Independent	3500	Norway		2023		
Starvation XTRI	Active	Full	XTRI World Tour	5260	USA, Utah	Iron Cowboys Race	2021		YES
StoneBrixiaMan	Active	Full	Extreme Triathlon Series	7050	Italy				
Swedeman XTRI	Active	Full	XTRI World Tour	4697	Sweden	Swim finish at Waterfall.	2018		YES
Swissman XTRI	Active	Full	XTRI World Tour	5750	Switzerland	Run under a waterfall	2013		YES
Tatraman	Active	Half	Independent	3245	Poland	Swim between 2 castles			
ThorXtri	Active	Half	Independent		Norway				
TriathlonX Full X	Last 2022	Full	Independent	5137	England	"Toughest Xtreme" (220 article)	2015		
TriathlonX Extreme X	Active	Full	Independent	7336	England	"Toughest Xtreme" (220 article)	2015		
Triverest	Active	Full+	Independent	8900	Switzerland	Greatest ascents (tied with Himalayan)			
Wataha	Active	Full	Independent	6200	Poland	Mountains of The Wolf	2021		
Wild Siberia	Active	Full		3600	Russia	2.5k 9c swim in 'Dead Lake' Cheybek-Kohl.	2020	Xtremly Wild and beautiful.	
Wilderman	Active	Full,1/2	Independent	3570	North Dakota,USA	Lifejacket on bike & run. Creek crossing.	2014	Offroad bike. Gravel or MTB.	
Winterman	Active	Full	Extreme Triathlon Series	4700	Czech Republic	9 km downstream swim.	2015		

=== SOLO POINT FIVE race catalogue ===
Race	Status	Distance	Org	Ascents (mtrs)	Country	Extras / Mythical feature(s)	First Ran	Notes
CELTMAN! XTRI SOLO POINT FIVE	Active	Half	XTRI World Tour	2550	Scotland	Cold jellyfish swim, Belach na ba	2022	
CANADA XTRI SOLO POINT FIVE	Active	Half	XTRI World Tour	2100	Canada	AUtumn colours and Mont Megantic	2023	
BLACKLAKE XTRI SOLO POINT FIVE	Active	Half	XTRI World Tour	3100	Montenegro	Blacklake and Small Lake	2022	
FODAXMAN XTRI SOLO POINT FIVE	Active	Half	XTRI World Tour	2550	Brazil	Serra do Rio do Rastro	2022	
ORAVAMAN XTRI SOLO POINT FIVE	Active	Half	XTRI World Tour	2550	Slovakia	Technical Run	2010	
HIMALAYAN XTRI SOLO POINT FIVE	Active	Half	XTRI World Tour	3400	Nepal		2023	
SWEDEMAN XTRI SOLO POINT FIVE	Active	Half	XTRI World Tour	2000	Sweden		2024	
Greek Hero XTRI SOLO POINT FIVE	Active	Half	XTRI World Tour	3000	Greece		2024	

=== Historic race catalogue ===
Race	Status	Distance	Org	Ascents (mtrs)	Country	Extras / Mythical feature(s)	First Ran	Notes
007 Xtri	On Hold	Full	Independent	c8000	Germany, Italy and Austria	Cross three countries!	2019	Small test race. 2021 race unlikely.
Alaskaman	Ceased	Full	EEE/XTRI World Tour	2400	USA, Alaska	Resurrection Bay, Bear bells, River Hhandtram, Aleyska Ridge	2017	Cancelled 2020.
Alohaman	Ceased	Full	EEE	TBC	USA, Hawaii		2019	Cancelled 2020.
AlpineMan Xtreme	Ceased	Full	Independent	4900	Slovenia		2016	One year only
FjordXtreme	Ceased	Full	Independent	3900	Norway		2016	Held 2016 only.
Iceland	Ceased	Full	Independent	4179	Iceland	Midnight swim, Volcanoes.	2019	
KarkonoszMan	Last 2021	Half	Independent	2900	Poland		2014	
Manx Xtreme Tri	Ceased	Full	XTRI World Tour Prospect	3000	England		2019	Test race only.
Oppland (Oxtri)	Ceased	Full	Independent	2700	Norway		2015	
