= Vestfjellet =

Mountain in Vestfold, Norway

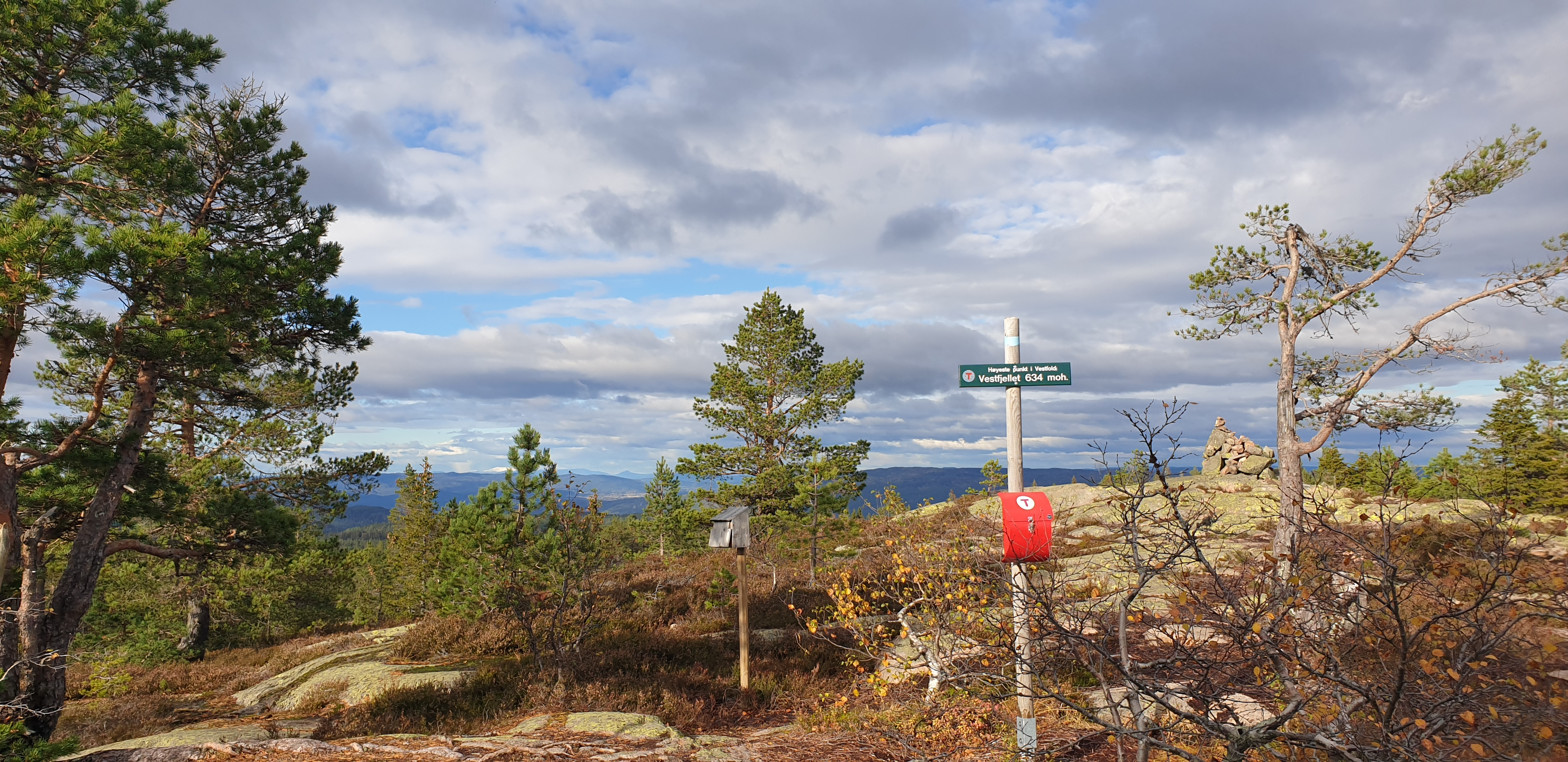
- Pemandangan Vestfjellet

Highest point
- Elevation: 634 m (2,080 ft)
- Prominence: 469 m (1,539 ft)
- Isolation: 12.6 km (7.8 mi)
- Listing: #13 of highest points of Norwegian counties
- Coordinates: 59°34′46″N 9°57′46″E

Geography
- Location within Vestfold Location within Norway
- Location: Vestfold, Norway

Geology
- Mountain type(s): 1714 II Kongsberg (west) and 1814 III Drammen (east)

Vestfjellet is a mountain in Holmestrand Municipality in Vestfold county, Norway. The 634-metre (2,080 ft) tall mountain is the highest point in Vestfold county. The mountain is located about 4.5 kilometres (2.8 mi) west of the village of Eidsfoss and about 9 kilometres (5.6 mi) to the northwest of the village of Hof. The mountain is surrounded by several other notable mountains including Skibergfjellet to the north, Grøntjernkollen to the southwest, and Buaren to the south. The lake Eikeren is located to the north of the mountain.

At the top of Vestfjellet, there are good panoramic views of large mountains such as Gaustatoppen and Styggmann as well as the large river Lågen and lakes such as Eikeren, Hajeren, and Øksne.

== See also ==
- List of highest points of Norwegian counties
- List of mountains of Norway by height
