= Gresvatnet =

Lake in Norway and Sweden

Gresvatnet (Norwegian) Graesiejaevrie (Southern Sami) Gräsvattnet (Swedish)
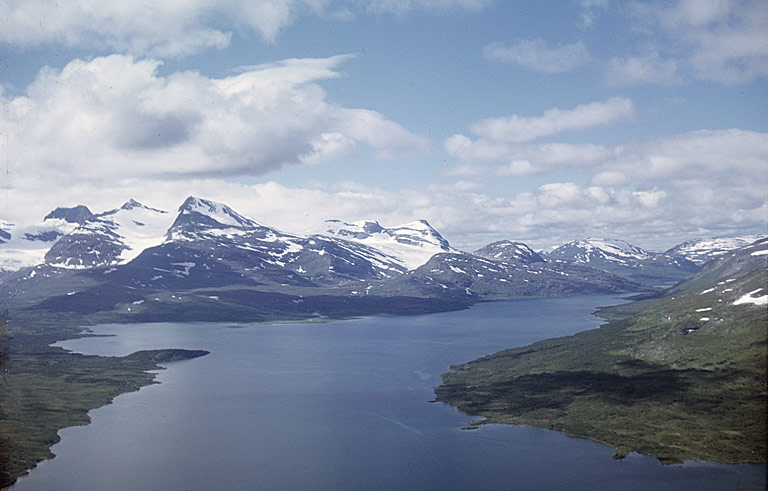
- Grasvatnet and Oksskolten mountains in the background
- Interactive map of the lake
- Location: Nordland, Norway and Västerbotten, Sweden
- Coordinates: 66.0579°N 14.4589°E
- Basin countries: Norway and Sweden
- Max. length: 11 kilometres (6.8 mi)
- Max. width: 4.5 kilometres (2.8 mi)
- Surface area: 22.63 km^{2} (8.74 sq mi) (18.67 km^{2} or 7.21 sq mi in Norway)
- Shore length^{1}: 44 kilometres (27 mi)
- Surface elevation: 595 metres (1,952 ft)
- References: NVE
- ^{1} Shore length is not a well-defined measure.

Gresvatnet (Norwegian) or Graesiejaevrie (Southern Sami) or Gräsvattnet (Swedish) is a lake on the border between Norway and Sweden. Most of the lake lies in Hemnes Municipality in Nordland county (Norway) and then a small portion crosses the border into Storuman Municipality in Västerbotten County (Sweden). The lake lies about 25 kilometres (16 mi) east of the village of Korgen, and just a few kilometres northeast of the mountain Oksskolten and the Okstindbreen glacier. The lake is one of the upper reservoirs for the Bjerka Hydroelectric Power Station.

== See also ==
- List of lakes in Norway
- Geography of Norway
