= Rømskog =

Rømskog Municipality Rømskog kommune
- Former municipality
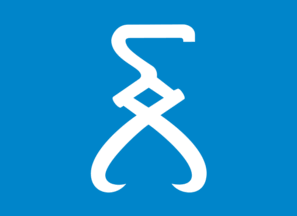
- Flag Coat of arms

- Østfold within Norway

- Rømskog within Østfold
- Coordinates: 59°42′52″N 11°48′31″E
- Country: Norway
- County: Østfold
- District: Smaalenene
- Administrative centre: Rømskog

Government
  - Mayor (2007): Nils Nilssen (Ap)

Area (upon dissolution)
  - Total: 183 km^{2} (71 sq mi)
  - Land: 159 km^{2} (61 sq mi)
  - Rank: #340 in Norway

Population (2008)
  - Total: 649
  - Rank: #420 in Norway
  - Density: 4/km^{2} (10/sq mi)
  - Change (10 years): ▲ +4.5%
- Demonym: Rømsking

Official language
  - Norwegian form: Bokmål
- Time zone: UTC+01:00 (CET)
  - Summer (DST): UTC+02:00 (CEST)
- ISO 3166 code: NO-0121
- Website: Official website

Rømskog was a municipality in Østfold county, Norway. The administrative centre of the municipality was the village of Rømskog. The former municipality of Rømskog was separated from Rødenes on 1 January 1902.

Rømskog was well known as one of the smallest municipalities in Norway, in numbers of citizens, with just above 600 citizens.

The word "skog" means "forest" in Norwegian, and that is what Rømskog consists of together with the agricultural landscape. Farms and huge / deep forests and small lakes like the lake of Rømsjøen. Deep forests that Rømskog shares with the neighbouring municipalities across the border of Sweden.

Slavasshøgda is a hill in Rømskog, and is the highest point in former Østfold county at 336 metres (1,102 ft).

At January 1. 2020 Rømskog merged with neighbouring Aurskog-Høland kommune (municipality).

== General information ==
=== Name ===
The Old Norse form of the name was Rymsskógr. The first element is the genitive case of the name of the lake Rymr (now Rømsjøen) and the last element is skógr which means "wood" or "forest". The meaning of the name Rymr is unknown.

=== Coat-of-arms ===
The coat-of-arms is from modern times. They were granted on 22 July 1983. The arms show a pair of silver logging tongs on a blue background. Since forestry is the main source of income for the municipality, it was considered an appropriate symbol.

Number of minorities (1st and 2nd generation) in Rømskog by country of origin in 2017
Ancestry	Number
Sweden	17
Netherlands	14
