= Hallingskarvet National Park =

National park in Norway

- IUCN category II (national park)

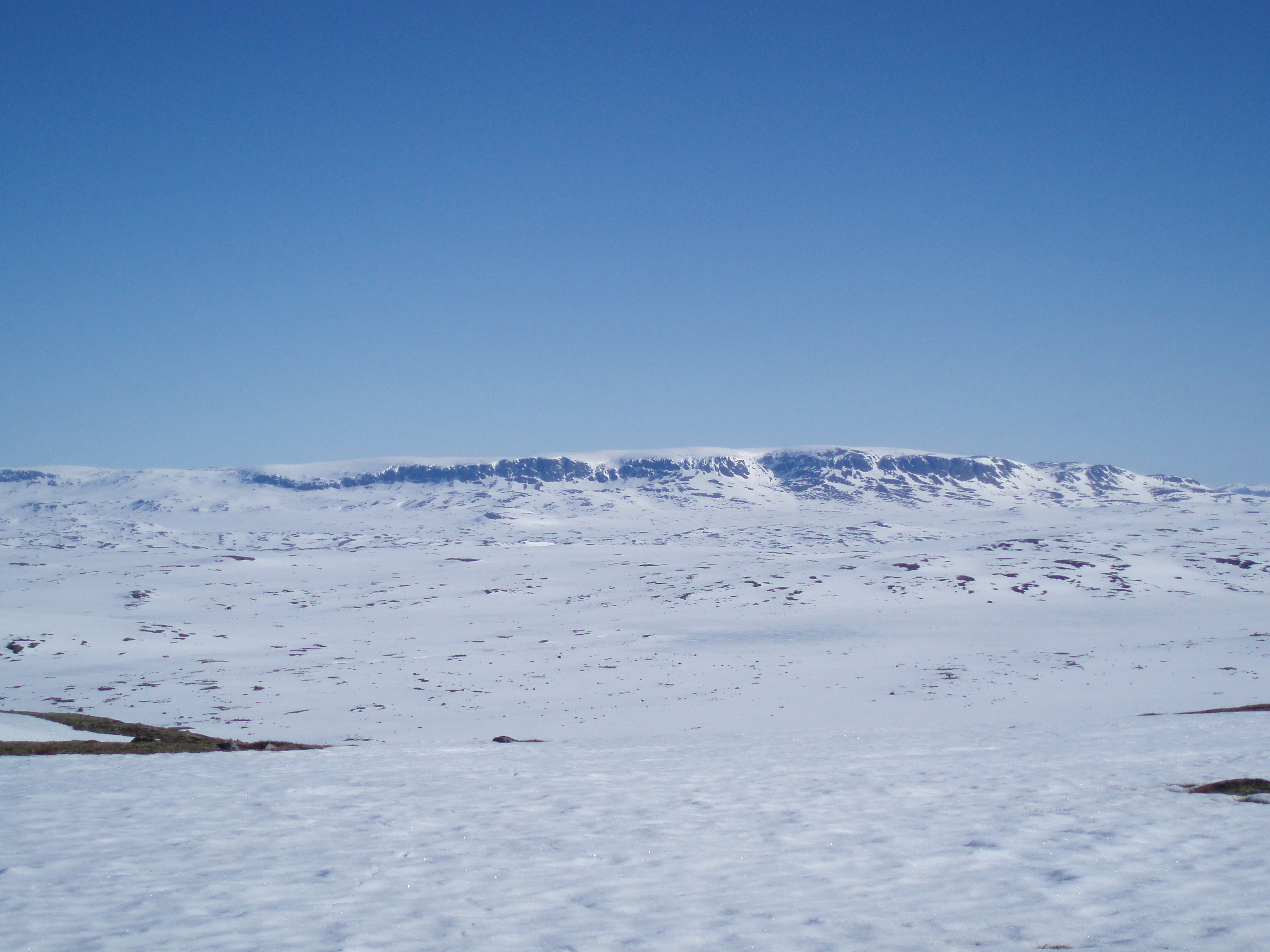
- Eastern part of Hallingskarvet seen from the south.
- Interactive map of Hallingskarvet National Park
- Location: Buskerud and Vestland, Norway
- Nearest city: Odda
- Coordinates: 60°36′N 7°42′E
- Area: 450 km^{2} (174 sq mi)
- Established: 22 December 2006
- Governing body: Directorate for Nature Management

Hallingskarvet National Park (Norwegian: Hallingskarvet nasjonalpark) is a national park in central Norway that was established by the government on 22 December 2006. The park is located in Hol Municipality (Buskerud county), Ulvik Municipality and Aurland Municipality (both in Vestland county). More precisely, the park comprises the Hallingskarv plateau and the high mountain areas to the west of it. It includes the Vargebreen glacier as well as the valleys of Såtedalen, Lengjedalen, Ynglesdalen, and parts of Raggsteindalen.

The national park covers 450 square kilometres (170 sq mi) of the Hallingskarvet mountain range and hosts large stocks of wild reindeer, an important factor in the establishment of the park. The highest point in the national park is Folarskardnuten which reaches an elevation of 1,933 metres (6,342 ft) above sea level.

The landscape of Hallingskarvet was shaped by multiple ice ages. The park shows the geological history and the connection between this history and the variation in the species living there. It includes areas of special value and which are home to threatened or vulnerable species such as Draba cacuminum (whitlow-grass) and Botrychium lanceolatum (lance-leaf grapefern).

The Bergen Line runs along the southern boundary of the park. There is no road access to the southern side of the park, so Finse Station, a stop on the railway line, is one of the few ways that people can access this part of the park. The Norwegian County Road 50 runs near the northern boundary of the park.

== Protection and use ==
The main objective of this national park is to preserve a large, unique, and largely untouched area in order to protect the landscape and the biome with its ecosystem, species and populations of, amongst others, the wild reindeer. The protection is designed to safeguard a characteristic element needed to understand the geological history of the Norwegian landscape. It is also designed to protect valuable elements of the cultural heritage.

The park is open to the traditional forms of outdoor activities which require little or no technical means.

== Name ==
The first element is halling (inhabitant of the Hallingdal valley) and the last is the finite form of skarv (mountain or mountainous area without vegetation).
