= Okstindan =

Mountain range in Nordland, Norway

Okstindan (Norwegian); Staajhk'åelkie (Southern Sami)
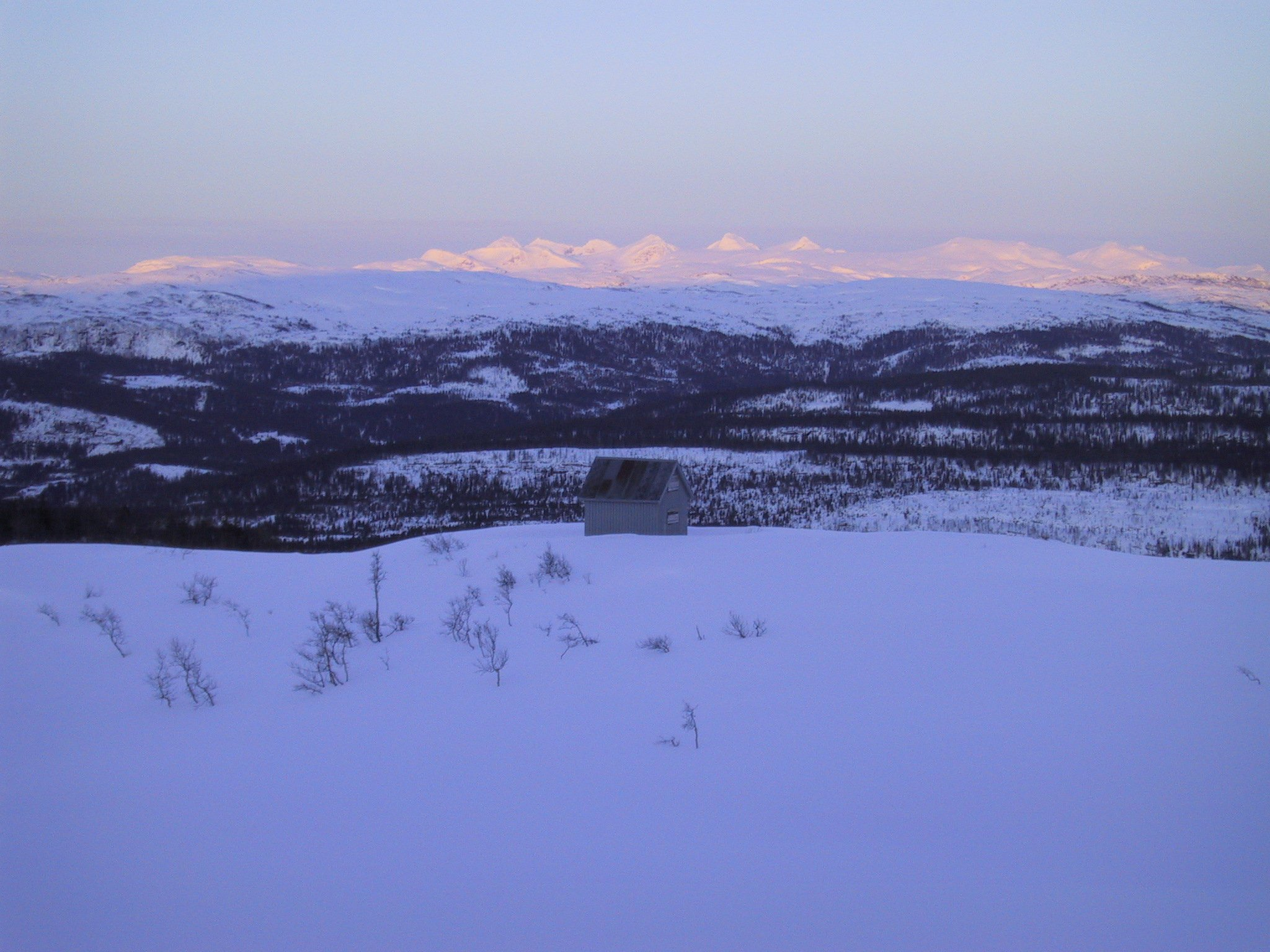
- Seen from Litjfjellet by Drevvatn

Highest point
- Peak: Oksskolten, Hemnes Municipality, Nordland, Norway
- Elevation: 1,916 m (6,286 ft)
- Coordinates: 66.0122°N 14.3386°E

Geography
- Interactive map of the mountain
- Location: Nordland, Norway
- Range coordinates: 66.0001°N 14.2937°E

Okstindan (Norwegian) or Staajhk'åelkie (Southern Sami) is a mountain range which lies in the inner Helgeland district in Nordland county, Norway. It is located within Hemnes Municipality. The mountain Oksskolten is part of the Okstindan range, and it is the highest mountain in North Norway. Other mountains in the range include Okstinden, Okshornet, Vesttinden, and Bessedørtinden. Between these mountains lies the large glacier Okstindbreen. The Swedish border lies just to the east of the mountains.

The most common starting point for tours of the Okstindan mountains is from the Leirskardalen valley or the lake Kjennsvannet in Hemnes Municipality.

== Media gallery ==
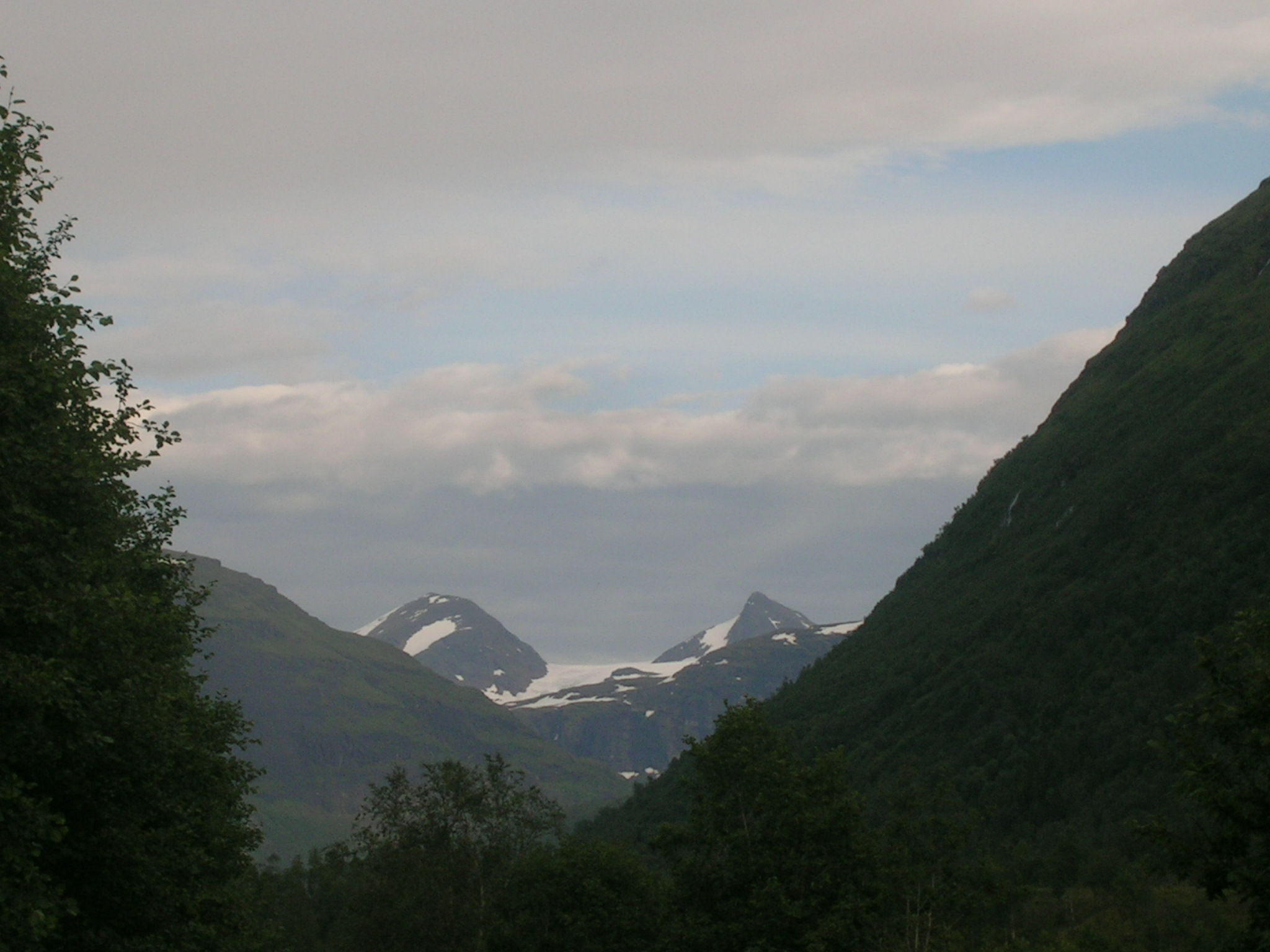
Okstindan, Nordland, Norway

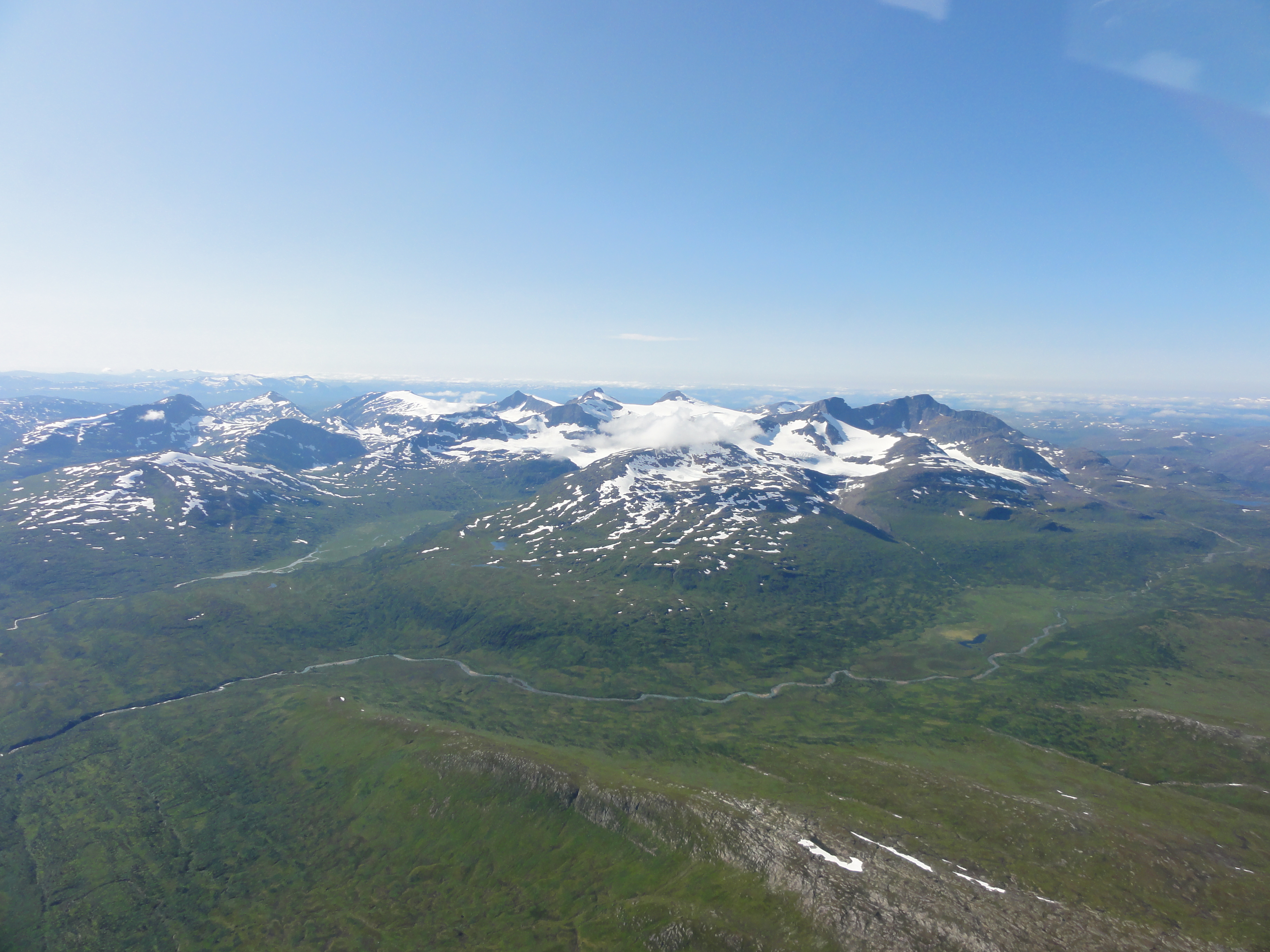
View of the mountains from Sweden

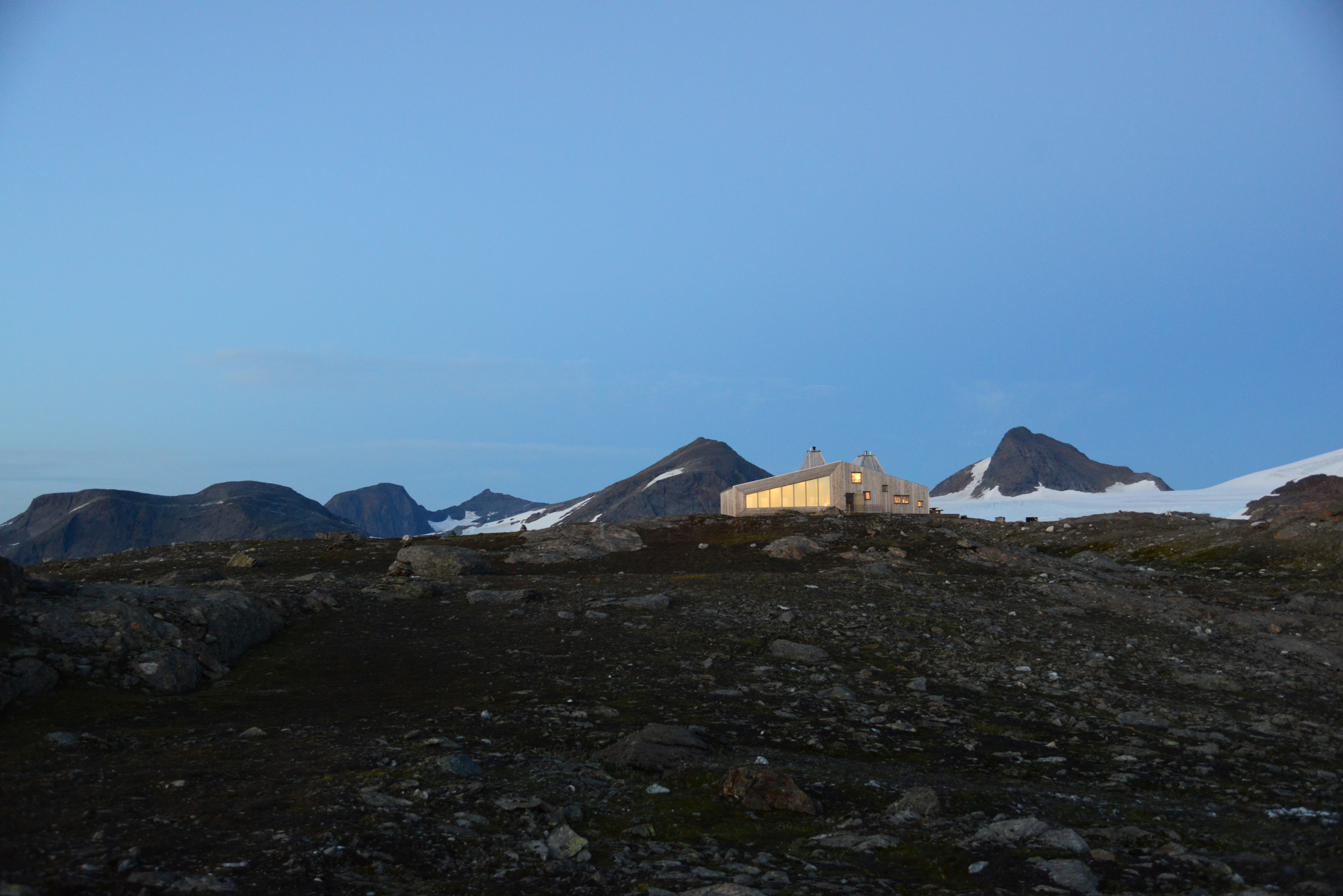

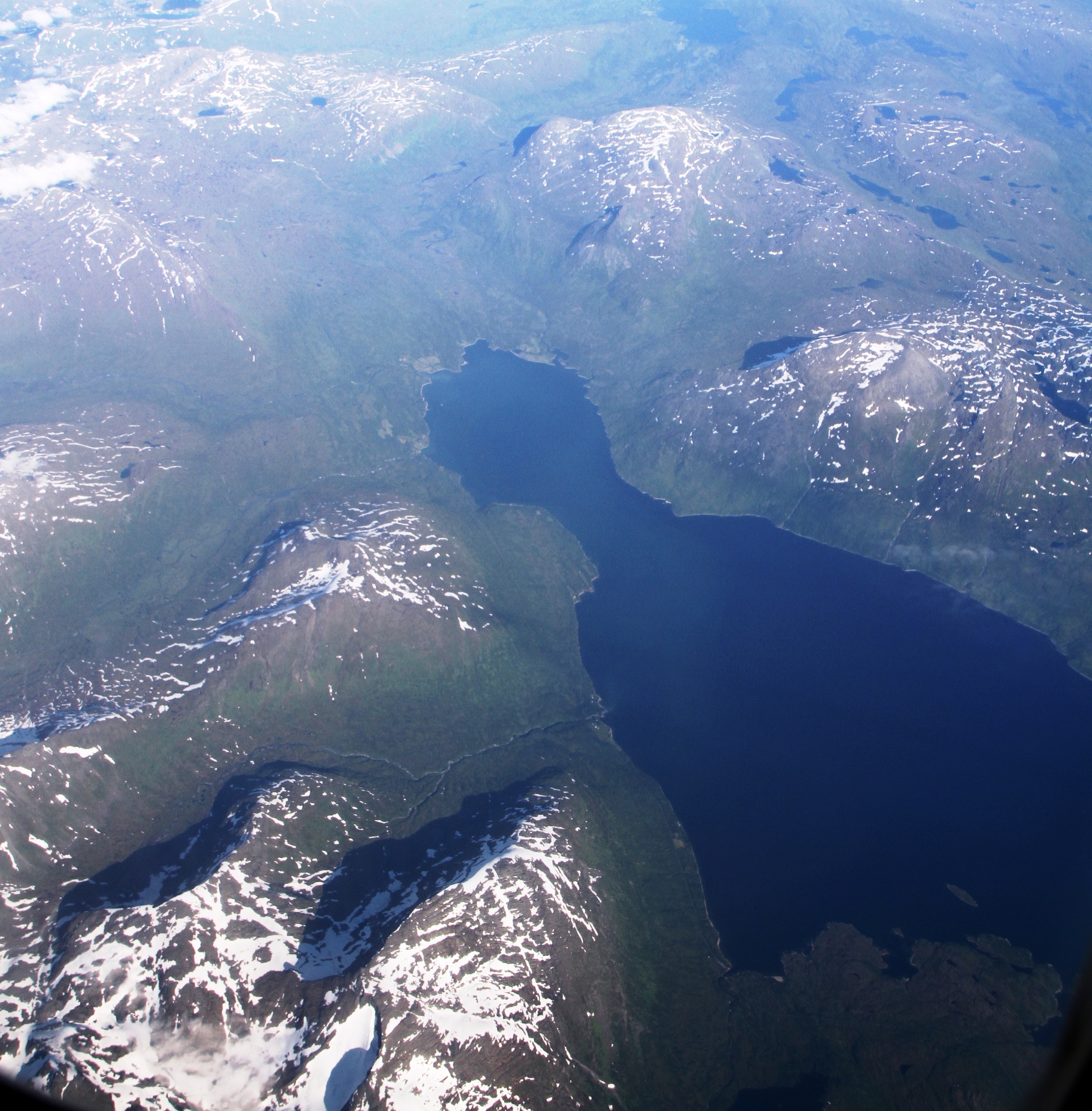
