= Norseman triathlon =

Non-Ironman branded triathlon race held annually in Norway

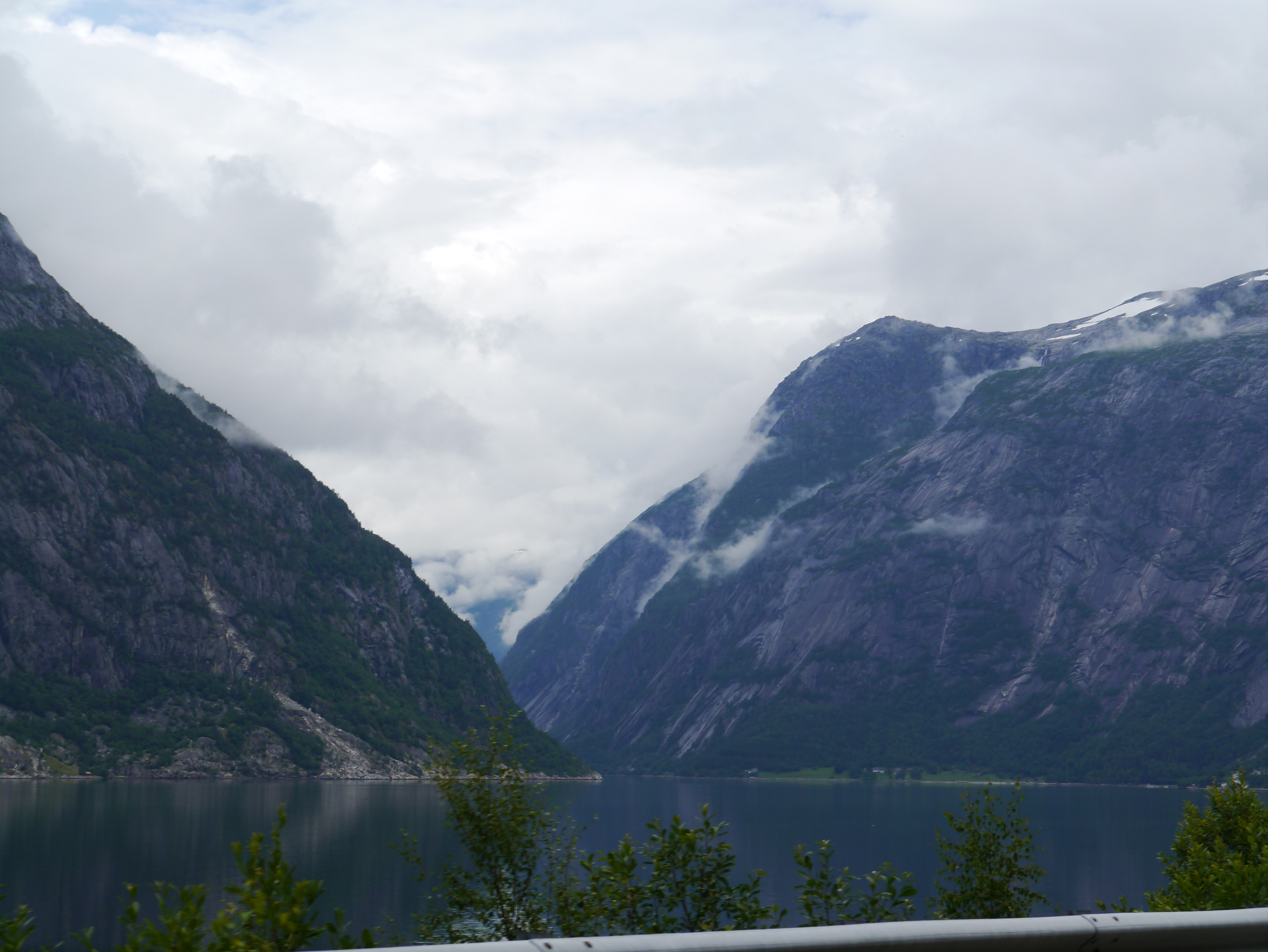
Eidfjorden, where the swimming event takes place

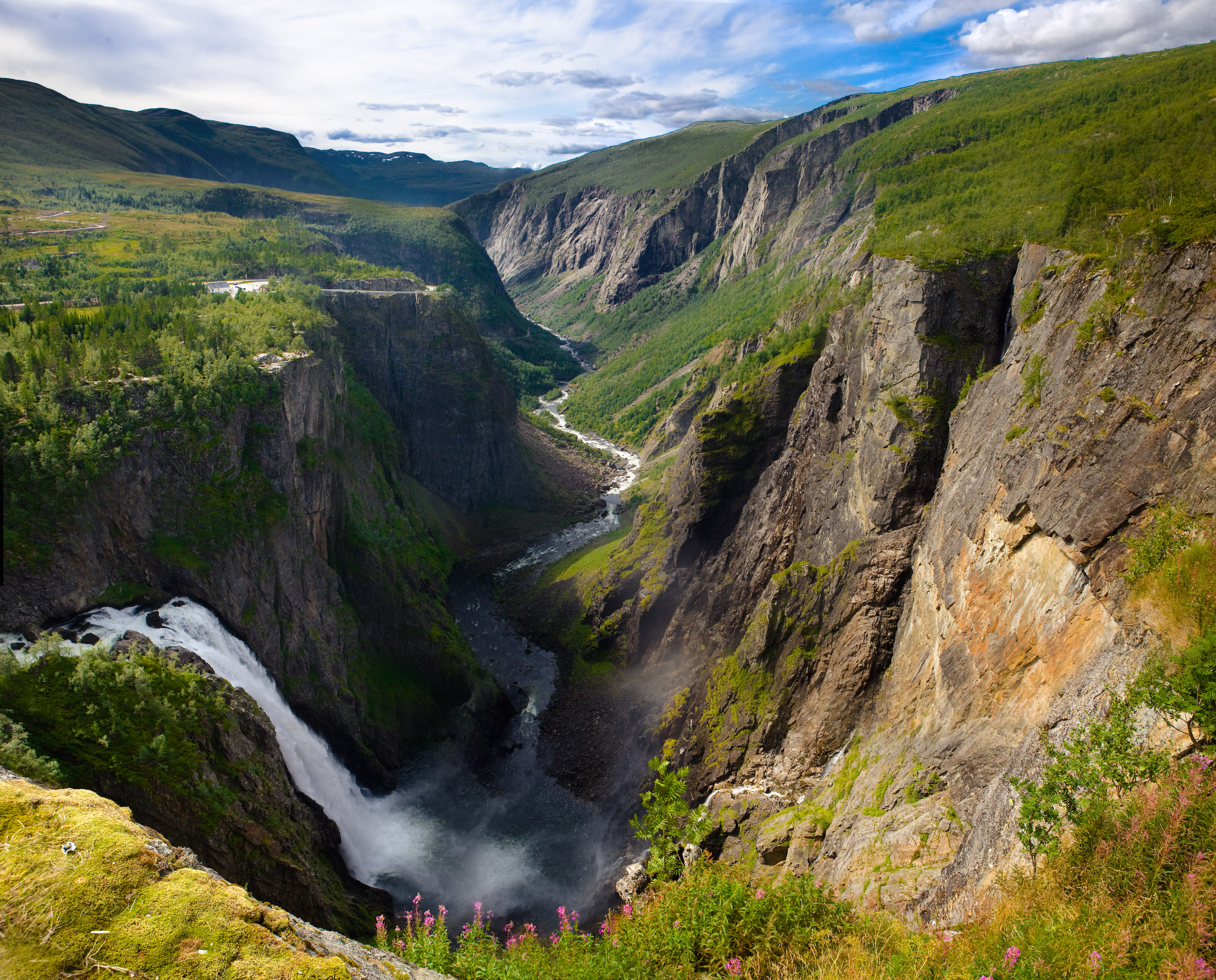
Måbødalen, which the cycling event passes through

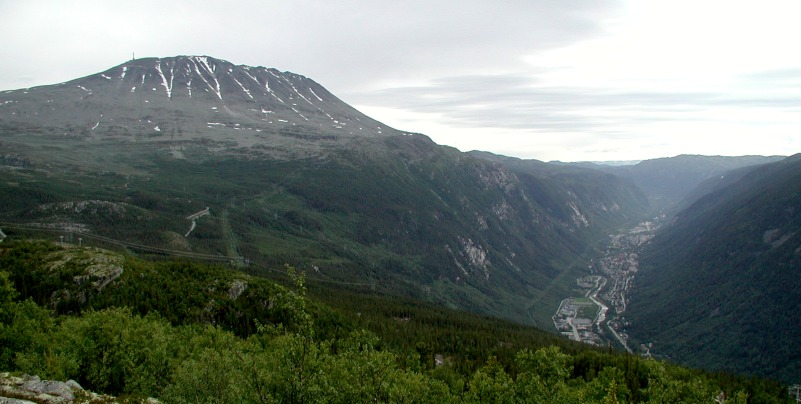
Gaustatoppen, where the final part of the running event takes place

The Norseman Xtreme Triathlon is a non-Ironman branded triathlon, point to point, race held in Norway annually. The distances are equivalent to those of an Ironman race with the swim starting from the loading bay of a car ferry, through the water of the Hardangerfjord to the local village, Eidfjord. At Eidfjord the competitors transition onto their bikes and then cycle 180 kilometres (110 mi) through the mountains, the first 40 kilometres (25 mi) of which is uphill (reaching 1200 m above sea level). After transition two (at Austbygdi, 190 m above sea level), the competitors then run 42.2 kilometres (26.2 mi) of which the first 25 kilometres (16 mi) (to Rjukan) are flat and following this they end up climbing the local mountain, Gaustatoppen, 1,880 m above sea level.

The race is "unsupported" so competitors need to have personal backup crews that follow them with cars to provide them with food and drink. The support crews also have to accompany their competitor up the final mountain climb due to the inherent dangers of being highly fatigued on a mountain. During this final mountain climb competitors are required to carry a backpack containing emergency food and clothing should the weather turn, whilst they are on the mountain.

== Weather and water ==
Weather conditions, strict health checks, and deadlines determine whether the race can be followed into the mountains and those who finish are given a black finisher's top and take on the name "Norsemen". Those that do not make the cut-off time but complete the distance on a lower alternative route are given a white finishers top.

The water temperature in Eidfjord is a challenge to the organizers. In 2011, the swim course was disturbed by a passing cruise ship, lowering the water temperature and requiring the swim to be moved further along the fjord. This change added 20 km to the bike course. In 2015, the water temperature was measured to 10 degrees Celsius. The safety team then decided to make the swim 1900 meters instead of 3800 meters. After the race, the safety crew decided to start the "Cold Water Research Project", which will continue for several years including one or more PhD degrees in progress. The studies are led by Jonny Hisdal and Jørgen Melau. Other than cold water studies, the group has also started studies on biomarkers, lung functions and heart function. In 2019, there was a research effort at Norseman, and the research group has published their first scientific papers.

== Participants ==
The number of participants is limited to a certain number of competitors (290 for 2020; 250 are invited, from sponsors, media and the majority from a draw; around 40 from qualified XTRI World Tour races for the World Championship). Approximately 40% of the participants are from outside Norway; and about 15% are female. During the period 2003-2015, a total of 175 women and 1,852 men successfully finished the race. The average time to finish the race was around 15 hours, with no statistically significant difference in finishing times between men and women.

Norseman Xtreme Triathlon first took place in 2003 with 21 individuals at the start line. The race record (full swimming distance) is 09:09:57 by Jon Sæverås Breivold (Norway) in 2023 for men and 11:00:23 by Julia Skala (Germany) in 2025 for women.

== Winners ==
Year	Class	Winner	Club, Country	Time	Notes
2003	Men	Christian Houge-Thiis	Stavanger, Norway	12:48:28	
2004	Men	Rune Høydahl	Sande i Vestfold, Norway	11:30:08	
2004	Women	Trude Andersen	Stavanger, Norway	13:15:20	
2005	Men	Björn Andersson	Sweden	10:30:09	
2005	Women	Trude Andersen	Stavanger, Norway	12:21:31	
2006	Men	Ole Stougaard	Denmark	10:49:57	
2006	Women	Marie Veslestaul	Høydalsmo I.L, Norway	14:46:25	
2007	Men	Lars Petter Stormo	Team Oslo Sportslager, Norway	11:25:18	
2007	Women	Emily Finanger	Inside Triathlon, Norway	13:01:00	
2008	Men	Øyvind Johannessen	Norway	11:08:10	
2008	Women	Jenny Gowans	New Zealand	14:02:00	
2009	Men	Tom Remman	Norway	11:19:48	
2009	Women	Susanne Buckenlei	Germany	13:21:48	
2010	Men	Henrik Oftedal	Norway	10:59:57	
2010	Women	Susanne Buckenlei	Germany	13:13:03	
2011	Men	Tim DeBoom	USA	11:18:52	200 km bike
2011	Women	Susanne Buckenlei	Germany	13:10:44	200 km bike
2012	Men	Henrik Oftedal	Norway	10:23:43	
2012	Women	Annett Finger	Germany	12:17:04	
2013	Men	Markus Stierli	Norway	11:25:16	
2013	Women	Inger Liv Bjerkreim Nilsen	Norway	12:43:14	
2014	Men	Allan Hovda	Norway	10:52:07	
2014	Women	Line Foss	Norway	12:56:27	
2015	Men	Allan Hovda	Norway	09:43:37	half swimming distance
2015	Women	Kristin Lie	Norway	11:50:48	half swimming distance
2016	Men	Lars Petter Stormo	Norway	10:22:37	
2016	Women	Kari Flottorp Lingsom	Norway	12:24:52	
2017	Men	Lars Christian Vold	Norway	09:52:10	
2017	Women	Anne Nevin	Norway	12:04:18	
2018	Men	Allan Hovda	Norway	10:05:48	
2018	Women	Mette Pettersen Moe	Norway	11:16:10	
2019	Men	Fedrik Linge Johnsen	Norway	10:47:55	
2019	Women	Danne Boterenbrood	Netherlands	13:13:59	
2021	Men	Jon Sæverås Breivold	Norway	10:21:47	
2021	Women	Julie Aspesletten	Norway	12:39:18	
2022	Men	Jon Sæverås Breivold	Norway	09:23:28	
2022	Women	Eilidh Prise	Scotland	11:47:49	
2023	Men	Jon Sæverås Breivold	Norway	09:09:57	Record
2023	Women	Flora Colledge	United Kingdom	11:20:10	
2024	Men	Sebastian Norberg	Sweden	10:10:16	
2024	Women	Laura Zimmermann	Germany	11:30:39	
2025	Men	Kristian Grue	Norway	09:45:20	
2025	Women	Julia Skala	Germany	11:00:23	Record
2026	Men	Kristian Grue	Ullensaker CK, Norway	09:53:46	
2026	Women	Nikola Corbova	Slovakia	12:04:56	

=== Coordinates ===
- Start 60.473°N 7.048°E
- Transition 1 60.4683°N 7.0682°E
- Transition 2 59.9888°N 8.8157°E
- Finish 59.8504°N 8.6560°E

== See also ==
- Xtreme triathlon
