= Slavasshøgda =

Mountain in Norway

Highest point
- Elevation: 336 m (1,102 ft)
- Prominence: 123 to 123.2 m (404 to 404 ft)
- Isolation: 16.4 to 16.6 km (10.2 to 10.3 mi)
- Listing: 19 at List of highest points of Norwegian counties
- Coordinates: 59°41′1″N 11°43′49″E

Geography
- Location: Rømskog, Østfold, Norway
- Topo map: 2014 III Rødenes

Slavasshøgda is a hill (elevation 336 meters), located in the Norwegian county Østfold, within the borders of the former municipality of Rømskog.

It was the highest point in the region of Østfold

== See also ==
- List of highest points of Norwegian counties
