= Rømsjøen =

Lake in Akershus county, Norway

- Location within Akershus Location within Norway
- Location: Aurskog-Høland (Akershus)
- Coordinates: 59°42′28″N 11°50′51″E
- Basin countries: Norway
- Surface area: 13.66 km^{2} (5.27 sq mi)
- Shore length^{1}: 47.71 km (29.65 mi)
- Surface elevation: 138 m (453 ft)
- References: NVE
- ^{1} Shore length is not a well-defined measure.

Rømsjøen is a lake in Rømskog in Aurskog-Høland, Akershus, Norway.

== See also ==
- List of lakes in Norway
