= Kjerkeberget =

Mountain in Norway

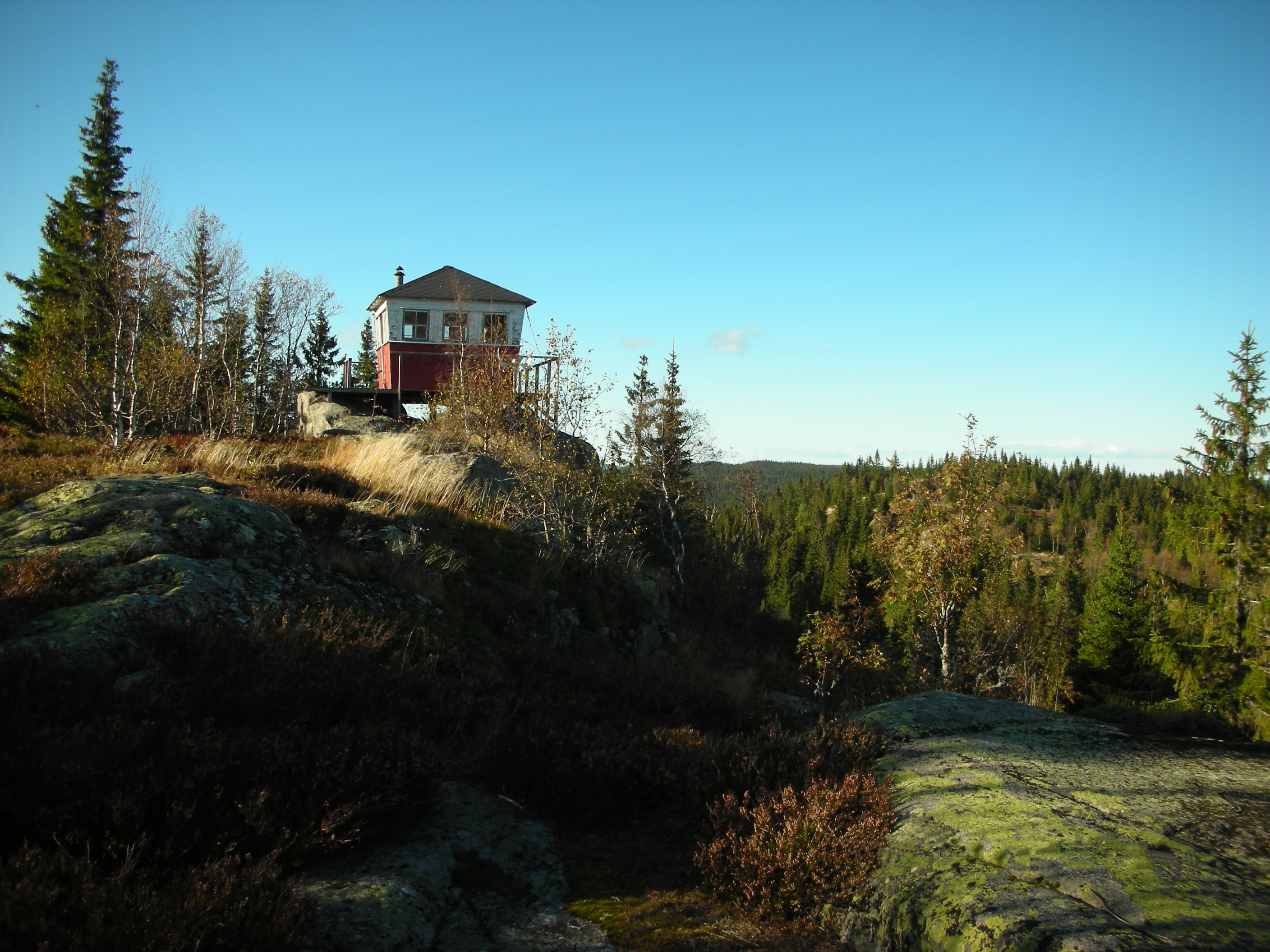
- The fire cabin at the summit of Kjerkeberget

Highest point
- Elevation: 631 m (2,070 ft)
- Listing: 18 at List of highest points of Norwegian counties
- Coordinates: 60°8′8.89″N 10°37′2.90″E

Geography
- Location: Oslo and Akershus, Norway
- Topo map: 1815 II Oppkuven

Kjerkeberget is a mountain in Nordmarka, Oslo, Norway.

It is the highest point, as well as the northernmost point in the county and municipality of Oslo. Its height is about 630 meters above sea level. It lies on the border of Oslo and the municipality Lunner in Akershus, between the lakes Sandungen in the southeast and Katnosa in the northwest.

The first element is kjerke f 'church', the last element is the finite form of berg n 'rocky mountain'. (Several mountains in Norway are called 'the church', because of some likeness in shape with a church). The word kjerke is the form in the dialect of the area - in Bokmål kirke, and in Nynorsk kyrkje.

During World War II, Milorg used this hill as a site for parachute drops. On 4 October 1942, Milorg's District 13 received its first paradrop here. In the paradrop were four people: Tor Helliesen, Jan Allan, Ruben Larsen and Johannes S. Andersen.
