= List of highest points of Norwegian counties =

This is a list of the highest points (mountains, hills, glaciers) of all current Norwegian counties, ranked by elevation.

Rank	County	Name	Type	Elevation
1	Innlandet	Galdhøpiggen	mountain	2,469 m (8,100 ft)
2	Vestland	Store Skagastølstind	mountain	2,405 m (7,890 ft)
3	Møre og Romsdal	Puttegga	mountain	1,999 m (6,558 ft)
4	Trøndelag	Storskrymten	mountain	1,985 m (6,512 ft)
5	Buskerud	Folarskardnuten	mountain	1,933 m (6,342 ft)
6	Nordland	Oksskolten	mountain	1,916 m (6,286 ft)
7	Telemark	Gaustatoppen	mountain	1,883 m (6,178 ft)
8	Troms	Jiehkkevárri	mountain	1,833 m (6,014 ft)
9	Rogaland	Vassdalseggi	mountain	1,658 m (5,440 ft)
10	Agder	Sæbyggjenuten	mountain	1,507 m (4,944 ft)
11	Finnmark	Øksfjordjøkelen	glacier	1,204 m (3,950 ft)
12	Akershus	Fjellsjøkampen	mountain	812 m (2,664 ft)
13	Vestfold	Vestfjellet	mountain	634 m (2,080 ft)
14	Oslo	Kjerkeberget	hill	629 m (2,064 ft)
15	Østfold	Slavasshøgda	hill	336 m (1,102 ft)

== Highest points by former counties ==
(before 2016) Ranked by elevation.

Rank	County	Name	Type	Elevation
1	Oppland	Galdhøpiggen	mountain	2,469 m (8,100 ft)
2	Sogn og Fjordane	Store Skagastølstind	mountain	2,405 m (7,890 ft)
3	Hedmark	Rondeslottet	mountain	2,178 m (7,146 ft)
4	Møre og Romsdal	Puttegga	mountain	1,999 m (6,558 ft)
5	Sør-Trøndelag	Storskrymten	mountain	1,985 m (6,512 ft)
6	Buskerud	Folarskardnuten	mountain	1,933 m (6,342 ft)
7	Nordland	Oksskolten	mountain	1,916 m (6,286 ft)
8	Telemark	Gaustatoppen	mountain	1,883 m (6,178 ft)
9	Hordaland	Hardangerjøkulen	glacier	1,863 m (6,112 ft)
10	Troms	Jiehkkevárri	mountain	1,833 m (6,014 ft)
11	Rogaland	Vassdalseggi	mountain	1,658 m (5,440 ft)
12	Aust-Agder	Sæbyggjenuten	mountain	1,507 m (4,944 ft)
13	Nord-Trøndelag	Jetnamsklumpen	mountain	1,519 m (4,984 ft)
14	Vest-Agder	Urddalsknuten	mountain	1,434 m (4,705 ft)
15	Finnmark	Øksfjordjøkelen	glacier	1,204 m (3,950 ft)
16	Akershus	Fjellsjøkampen	mountain	812 m (2,664 ft)
17	Vestfold	Vestfjellet	mountain	634 m (2,080 ft)
18	Oslo	Kjerkeberget	hill	629 m (2,064 ft)
19	Østfold	Slavasshøgda	hill	336 m (1,102 ft)

== See also ==
- List of mountains in Norway by height
- List of mountains in Norway by prominence
