= Sandungen =

Lake in Oslo, Norway

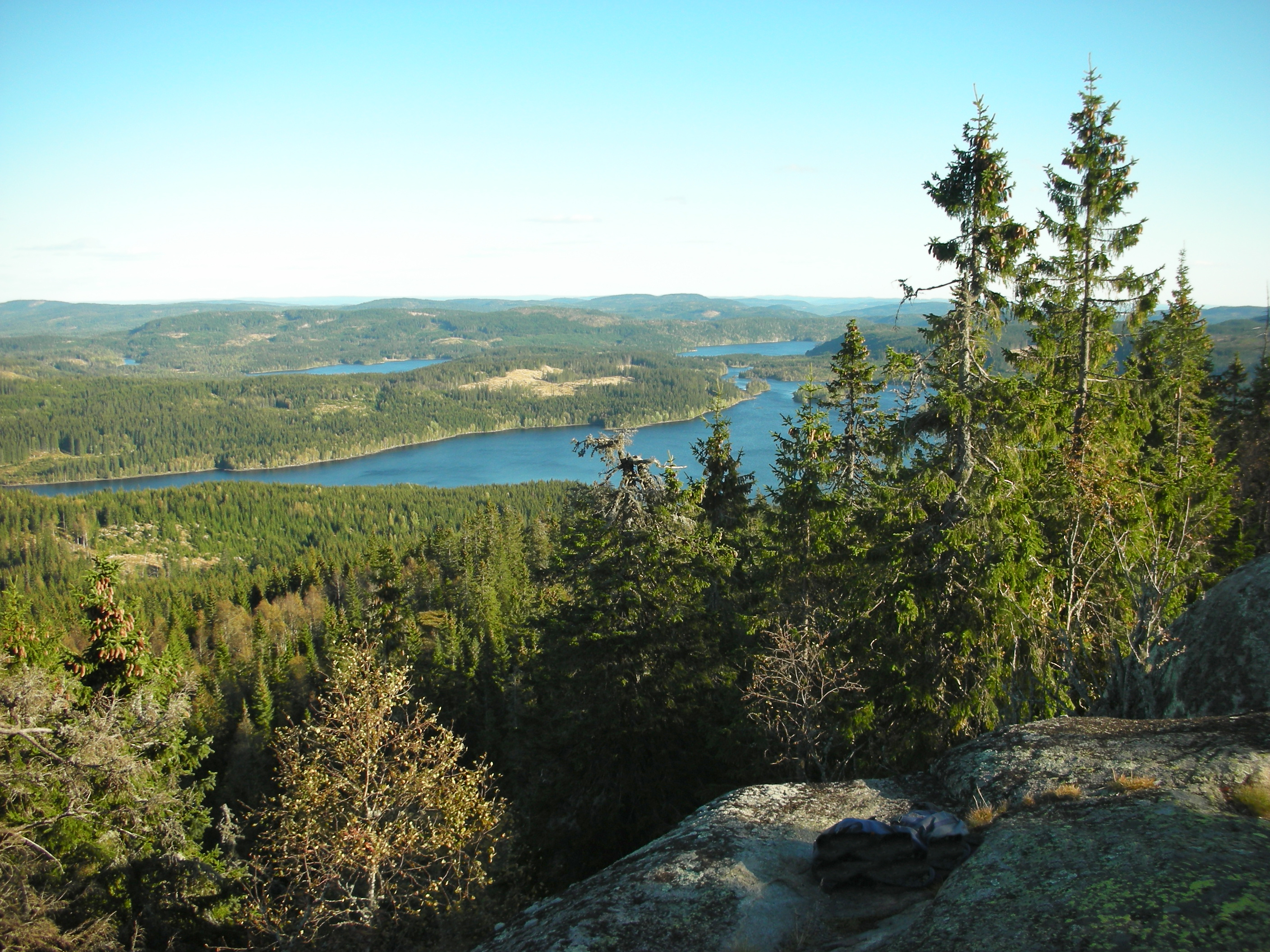
- Sandungen viewed from Kjerkeberget.

- Location within Norway
- Location: Nordmarka, Oslo
- Coordinates: 60.116°N 10.621°E
- Basin countries: Norway
- Surface area: 2.9 + 1.4 km^{2} (1.12 + 0.54 sq mi)
- Surface elevation: c.390 m (1,280 ft)

Sandungen is the name of two lakes in Nordmarka in Oslo, Norway. Store Sandungen has an area of 2.9 km^{2}, and the nearby Vesle Sandungen covers 1.4 km^{2}.
