= Fjellsjøkampen =

Mountain in Norway

Highest point
- Elevation: 812 m (2,664 ft)
- Prominence: 280 m (920 ft)
- Isolation: 2.44 to 2.46 km (1.52 to 1.53 mi)
- Listing: 16 at List of highest points of Norwegian counties
- Coordinates: 60°27′39.66″N 10°56′20.05″E

Geography
- Location: Hurdal, Akershus, Norway
- Topo map: 1915 IV Hurdal

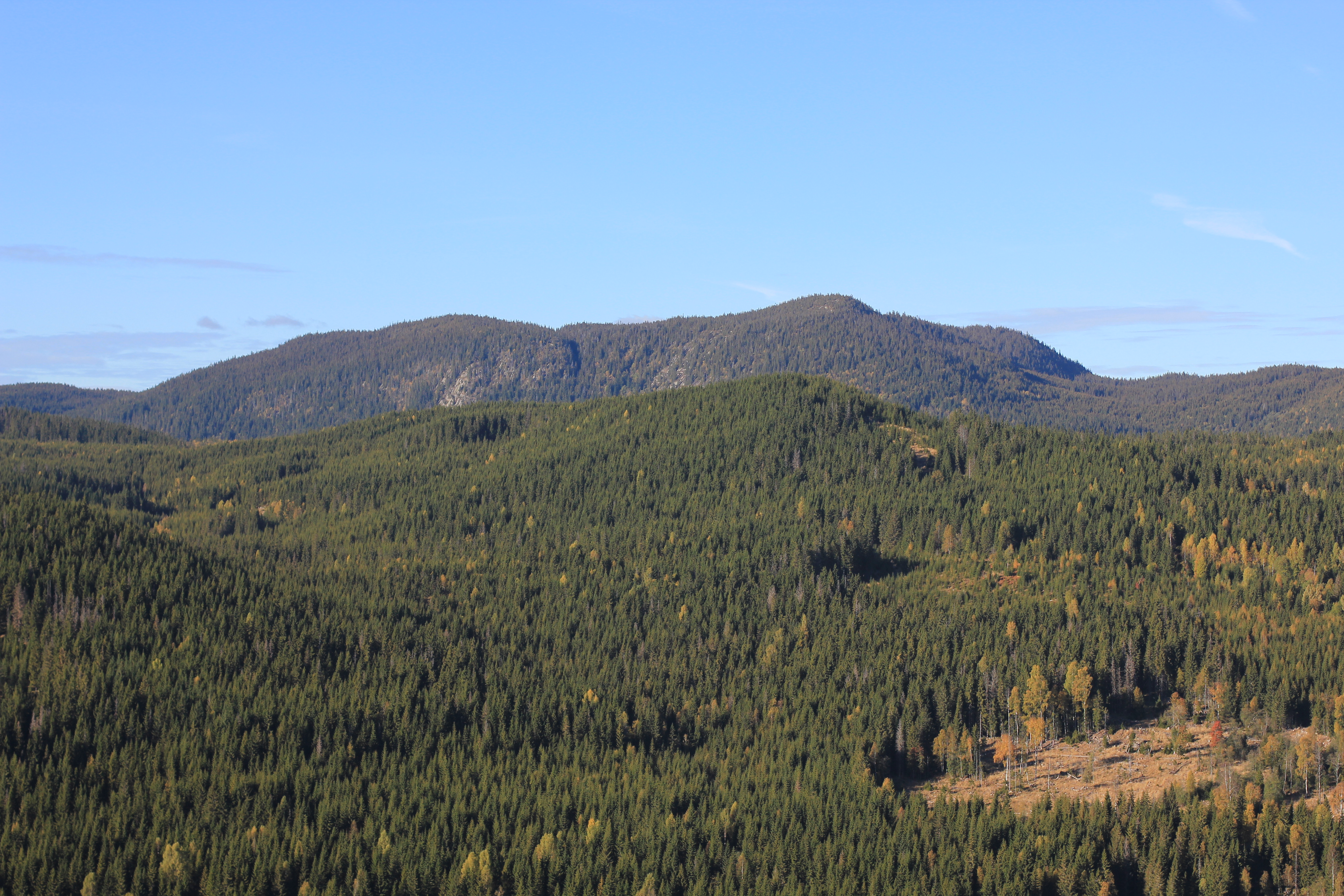

Fjellsjøkampen is a top in Hurdal, Akershus, Norway. It is the highest point in Akershus.

== See also ==
- List of highest points of Norwegian counties
