= Oksskolten =

Mountain in Hemnes, Norway

Oksskolten (Norwegian); Uktsiesnjurhtjien åejjie (Southern Sami)
- Interactive map of the mountain

Highest point
- Elevation: 1,916 m (6,286 ft)
- Prominence: 1,380 m (4,530 ft)
- Isolation: 192.8 to 193 km (119.8 to 119.9 mi) to Ryggåsberget
- Listing: #7 in Norway by height #8 in Norway by prominence
- Coordinates: 66.0122°N 14.3386°E

Geography
- Location: Nordland, Norway
- Parent range: Okstindan
- Topo map: 2027 III Storakersvatnet

Climbing
- First ascent: Peder Stordal (1883)
- Easiest route: Glacier crossing

Oksskolten (Norwegian; lit. 'Bulls Head') or Uktsiesnjurhtjien åejjie (Southern Sami) is a mountain in Hemnes Municipality in Nordland County, Norway. At 1,916-metre (6,286 ft) tall, it is the highest point in Nordland county, the highest in Northern Norway, and has Norway's eighth largest primary factor. The mountain lies just south of the lake Gresvatnet in the Okstindan mountain range east of the village of Korgen and north of the lake Røssvatnet.

The first recorded climb was by Peder Stordal in 1883. In order to get to the summit, climbers must cross the glacier to the north. The large Okstindbreen glacier lies to the west of the mountain.

== Gallery ==
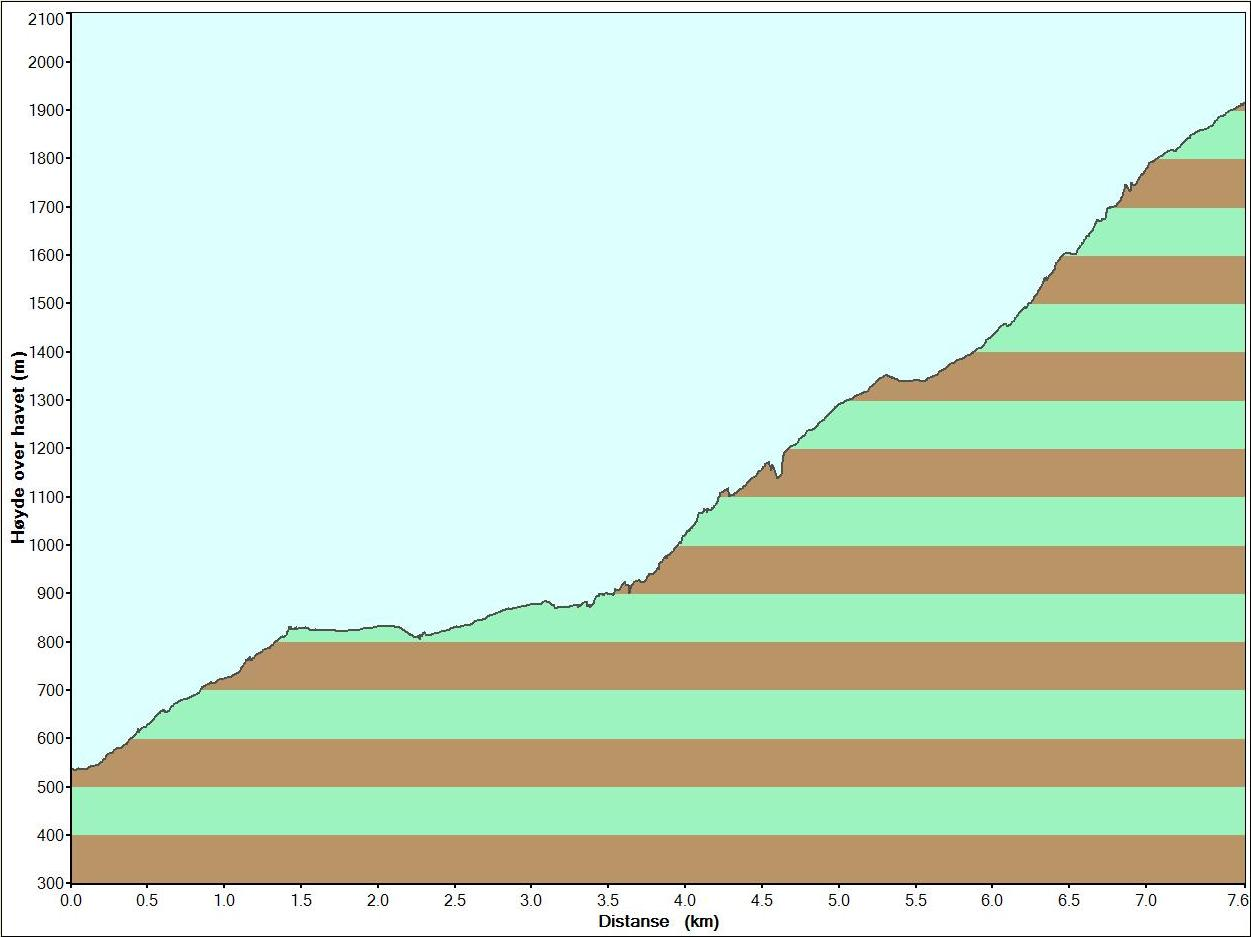
Height profile of Oksskolten

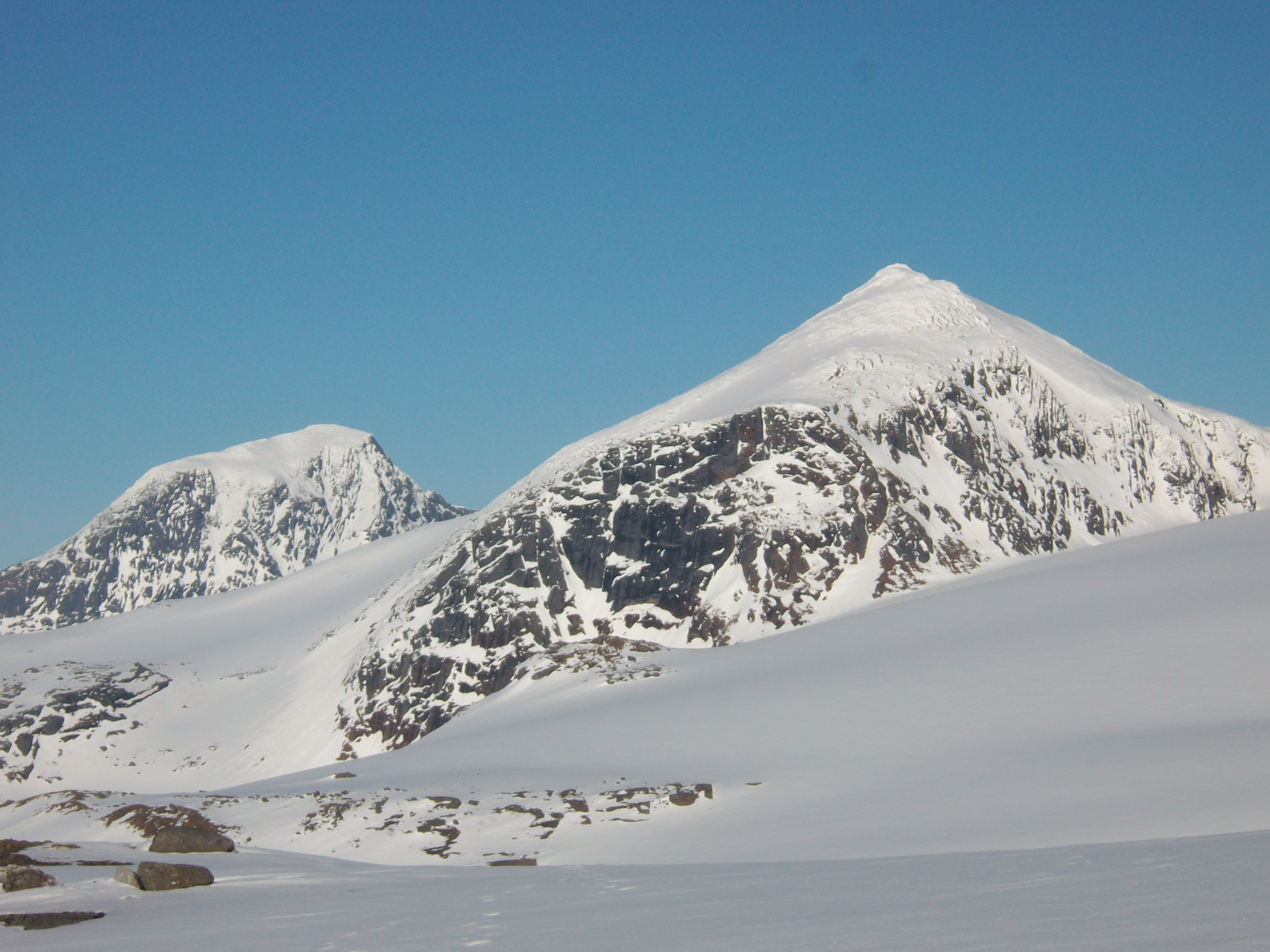
Oksskolten to the left

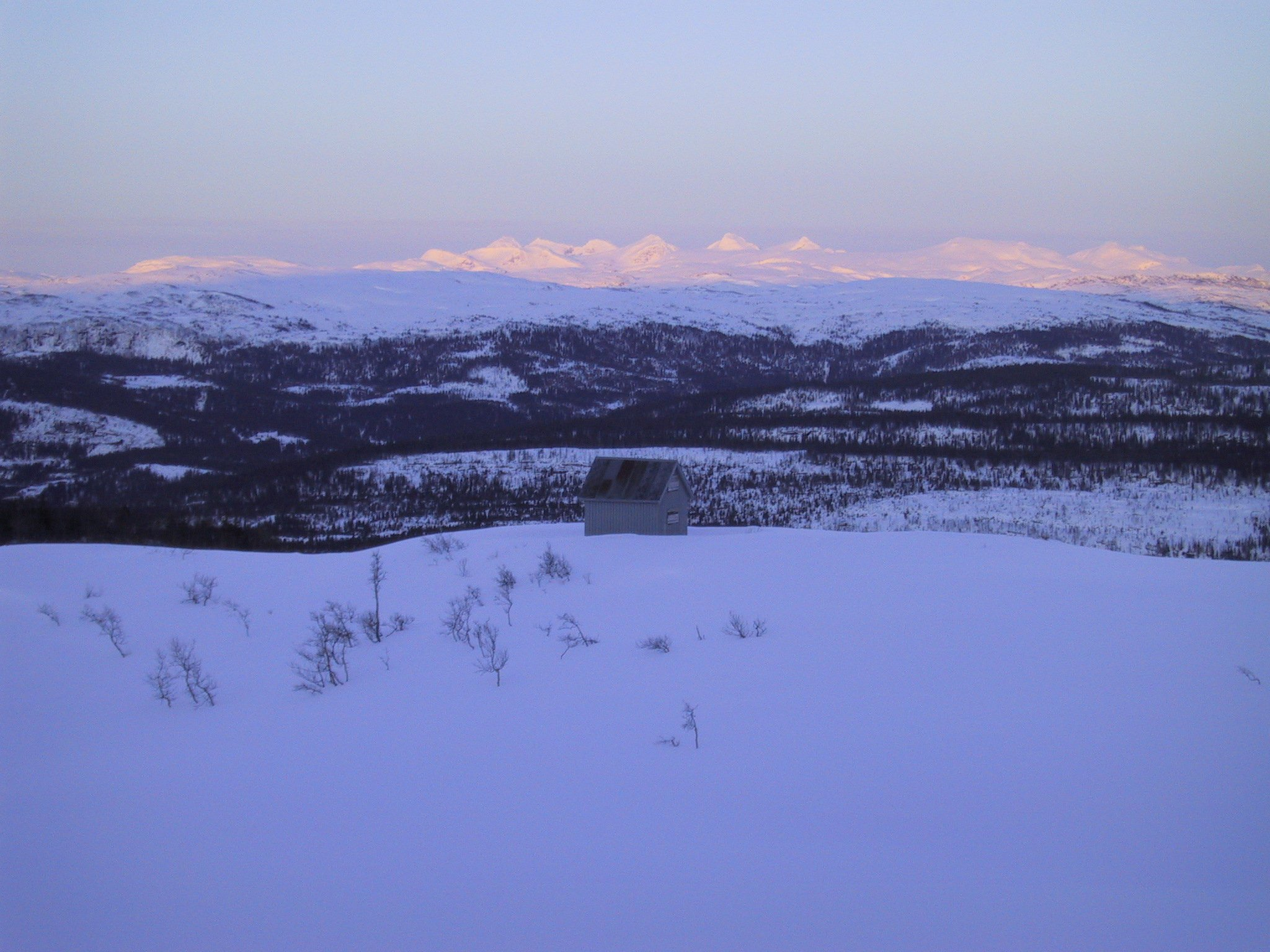
View of the Okstindan mountains

== See also ==
- List of highest points of Norwegian counties
