= Folarskardnuten =

Highest point of Hallingskarvetin, Norway

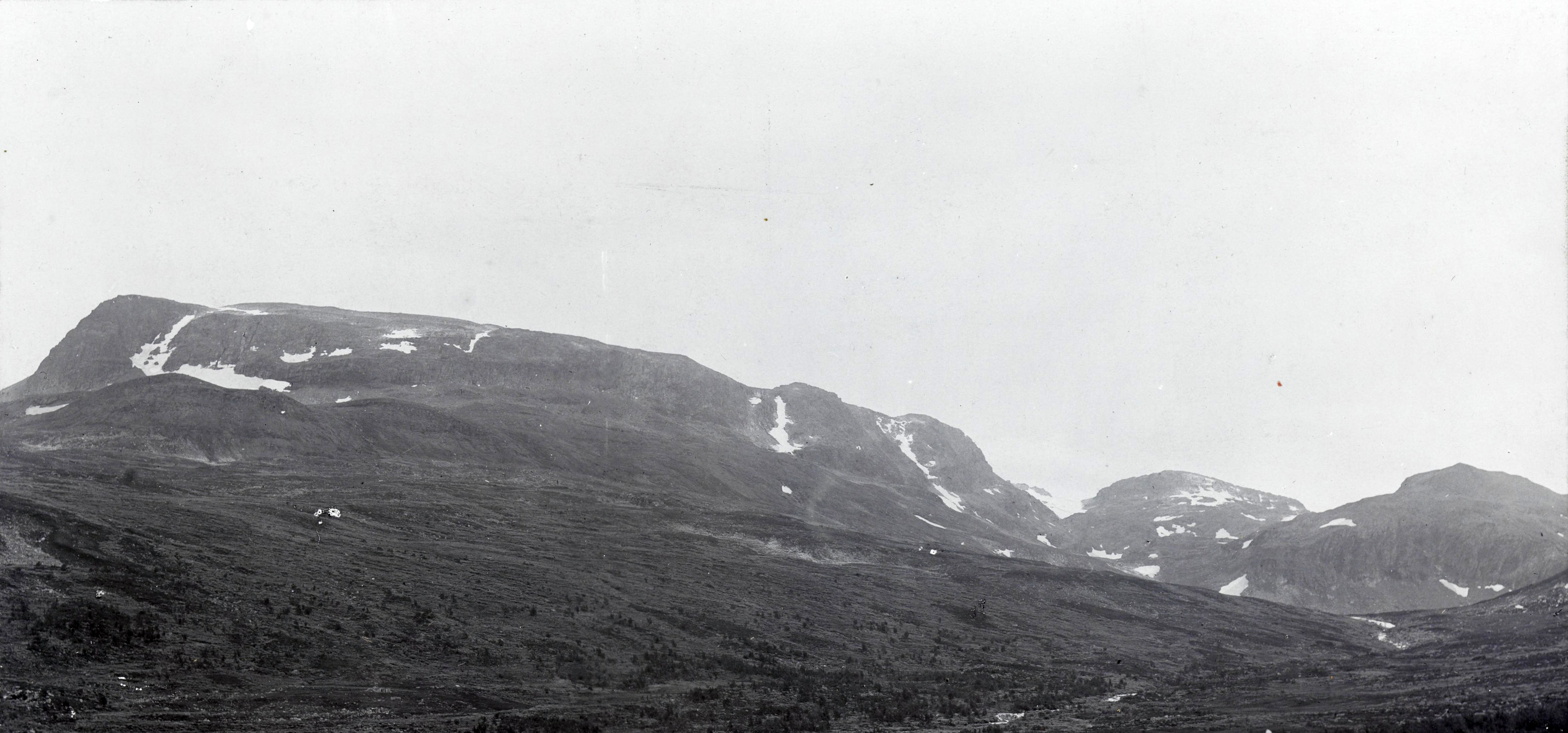
- Folarskardnuten seen from Rakstein valley

Highest point
- Elevation: 1,933 m (6,342 ft)
- Prominence: 917 m (3,009 ft)
- Isolation: 86.37 km (53.67 mi) to Hjelledalstinden
- Listing: 6 at List of highest points of Norwegian counties
- Coordinates: 60°36′35.66″N 7°43′21.70″E

Geography
- Location: Hol, Buskerud, Norway
- Parent range: Hallingskarvet
- Topo map: 1516 III Hallingskarvet

Folarskardnuten is the highest point on both Hallingskarvet, and in the Buskerud county of Norway.

The mountain lies within Hallingskarvet National Park, in Hol Municipality.

== See also ==
- List of highest points of Norwegian counties
