= Gaustatoppen =

Mountain in Telemark, Norway

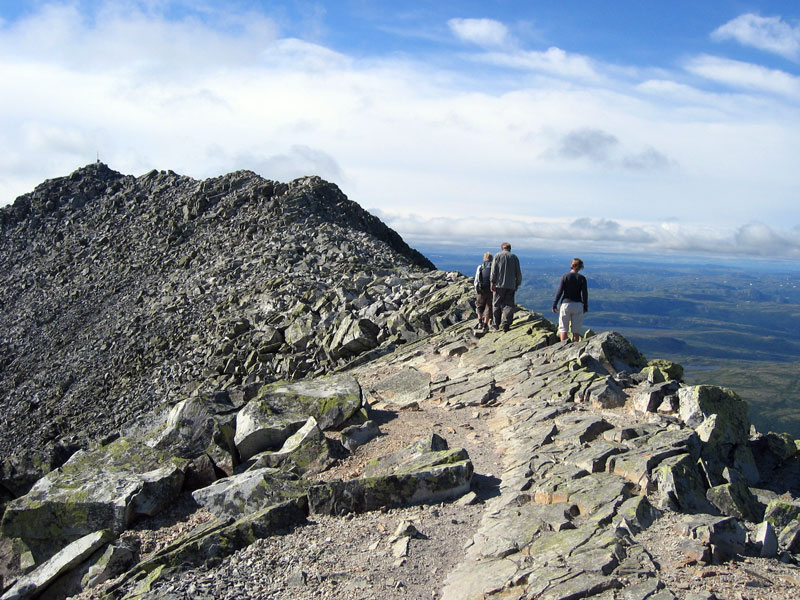
- View of the mountain

Highest point
- Elevation: 1,883 m (6,178 ft)
- Prominence: 964 m (3,163 ft)
- Isolation: 96.6 km (60.0 mi) to Hallingskarvet
- Listing: #8 (Highest points of Norwegian counties)
- Coordinates: 59°51′15″N 8°38′57″E

Geography
- Location: Telemark, Norway
- Topo map: 1614 IV Rjukan

Climbing
- First ascent: 1810 by Jens Esmark
- Easiest route: Funicular system inside mountain or hike from a carpark on the southeastern side.

Gaustatoppen is a mountain in the county of Telemark, Norway. The 1,883-metre (6,178 ft) tall mountain is located on the south side of the town of Rjukan and is the highest mountain in Telemark. The summit lies in Tinn Municipality, but there is a lower plateau that crosses the municipal border into Hjartdal Municipality.

The view from the summit is impressive, as one can see an area of approximately 60,000 square kilometres (23,000 sq mi), nearly one-sixth of Norway's mainland. The mountain is popular for downhill skiing in the winter, and competitions have been held on its slopes. These competitions include the "Norseman triathlon", billed as "the world's most brutal iron-distance triathlon". It starts in Eidfjord and finishes at the top of Gaustatoppen. The summit is accessible on foot in the summer, on a rocky pathway of medium difficulty, although the southwestern side of the mountain is very dangerous and inaccessible. The wreckage of an airplane crash still lies on that side of the mountain since it is too difficult to remove it.

== Name ==
The first element is Gausta, the name of the whole mountain, the last element is the finite form of topp which means "top" or "summit". The name Gausta is probably a shortened form for Gaustafjell which means "Gausta mountain", because Gausta originally was the name of a farm beneath the mountain. (For the same development see Dovrefjell.) The Old Norse form of the name was maybe Gautstǫð, the name is then a compound of gaut which means "flooded place", and stǫð which means "stead" or "landing place for boat". (The farm lies along the Rjukan river.)

== Railway ==
There is a funicular railway that was built inside the mountain for military purposes. This ascends from the base of the mountain almost to the summit. A short railway takes the passengers from the mountain base horizontally to the lower station deep inside the mountain. It was built to access the military radio relay station built on (and inside) the mountain top. The installation is now a tourist attraction. It was financed mainly by American military grants, and cost one million US dollars to build from 1954 to 1959.

== Gausta skicenter ==
The Gausta skicenter is a skiing centre on the mountain. It was created when two smaller alpine ski areas (Gaustatoppen Skisenter and Gaustablikk Skisenter) were merged and then a further expansion of slopes. As of 2019, it had 45 kilometres (28 mi) of slopes and 550 metres (1,800 ft) height difference. The skiing centre is located about 180 kilometres (110 mi) by road from Oslo and it aims to be one of the major ski areas in Norway.

== Media gallery ==
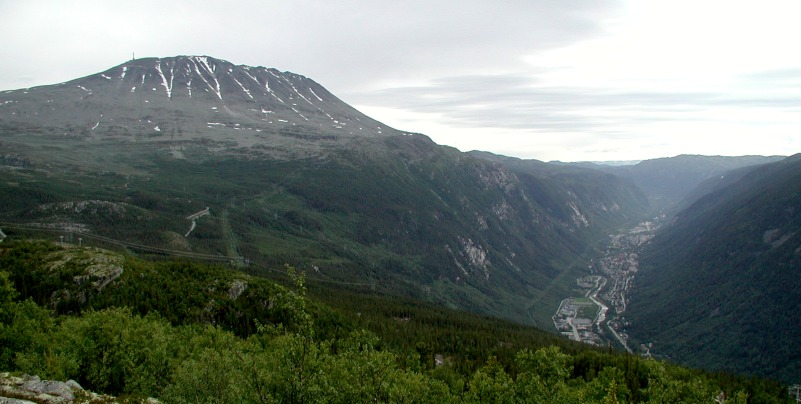
Gaustatoppen and Rjukan

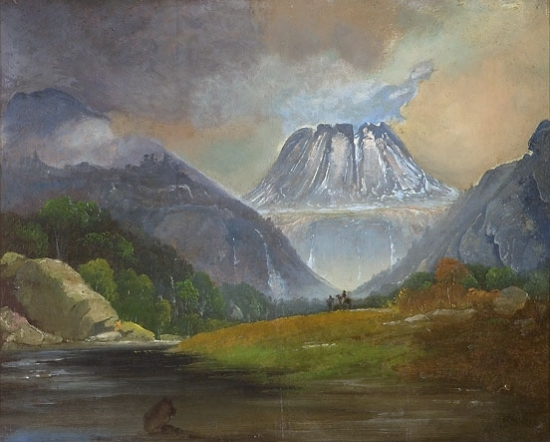
Gaustatoppen painted by Peder Balke around 1858

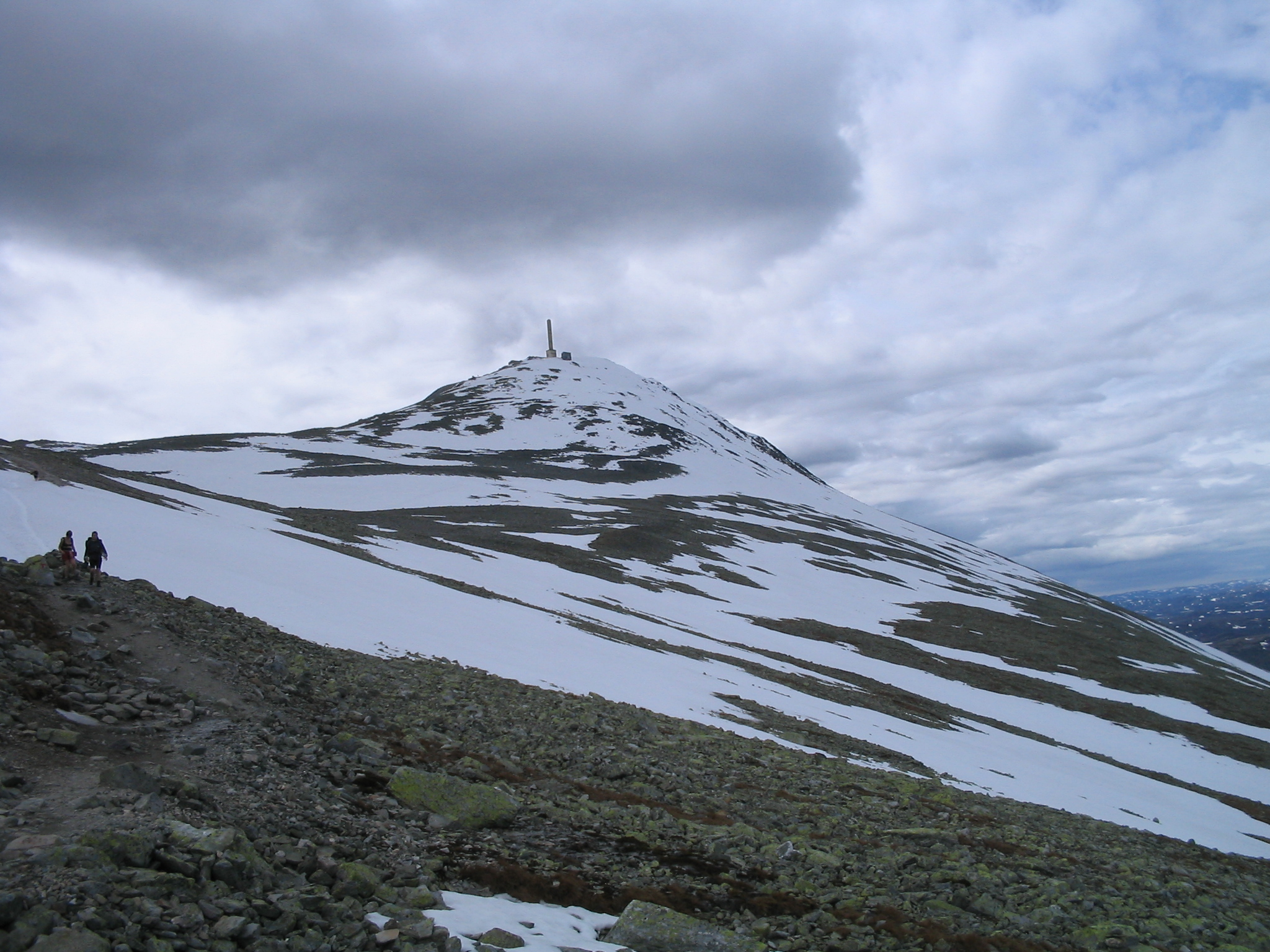

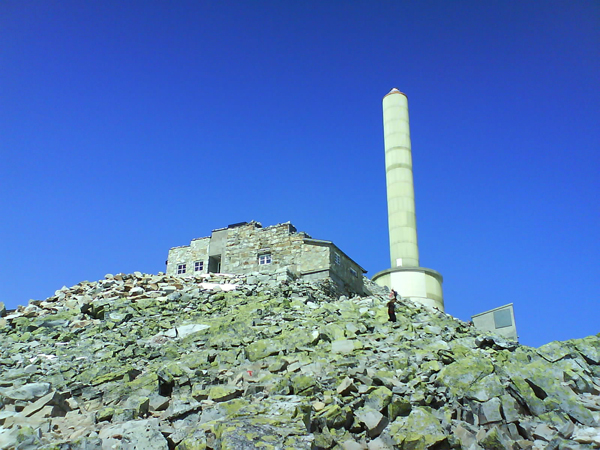
Summit installation

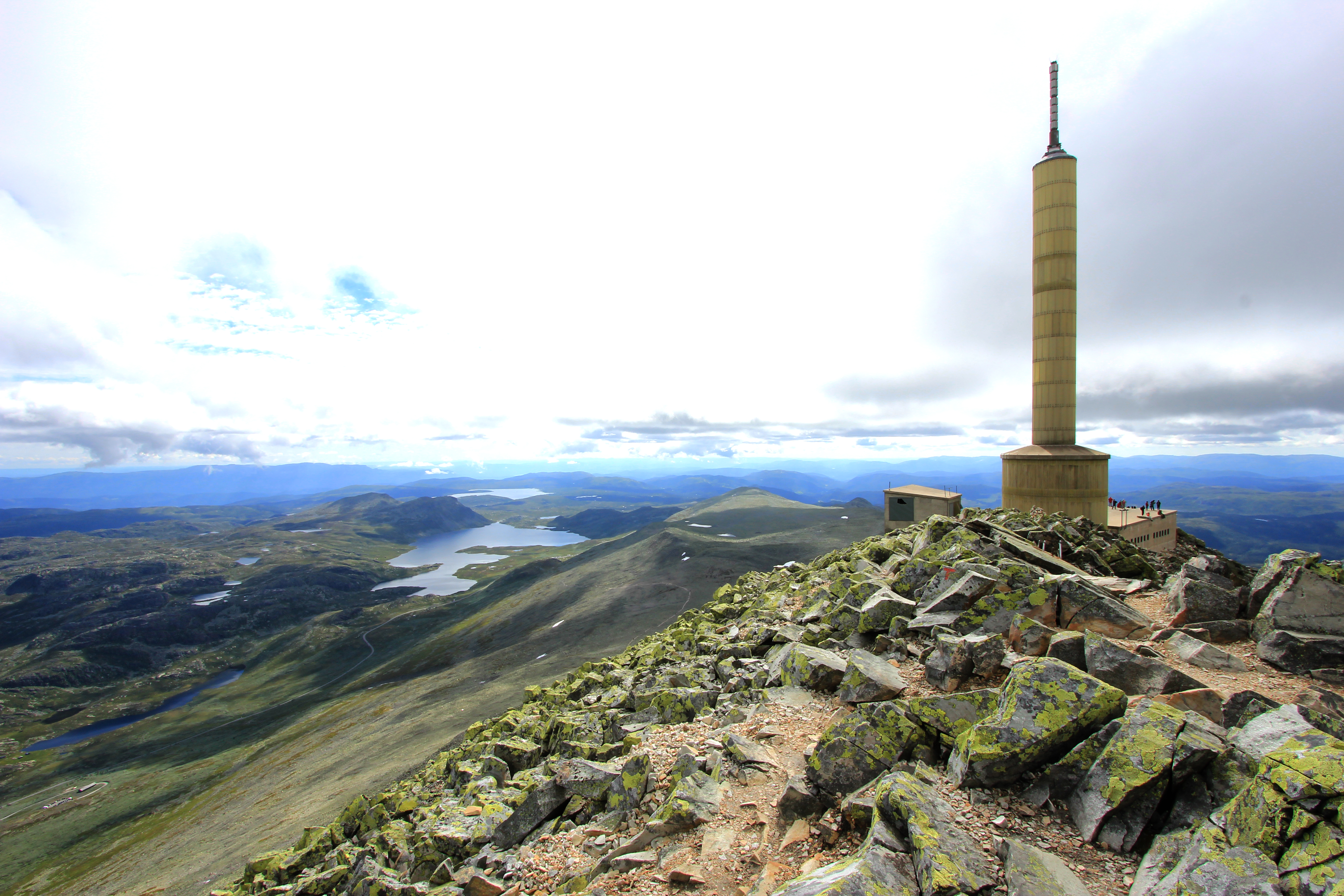
Gaustatoppen 2012

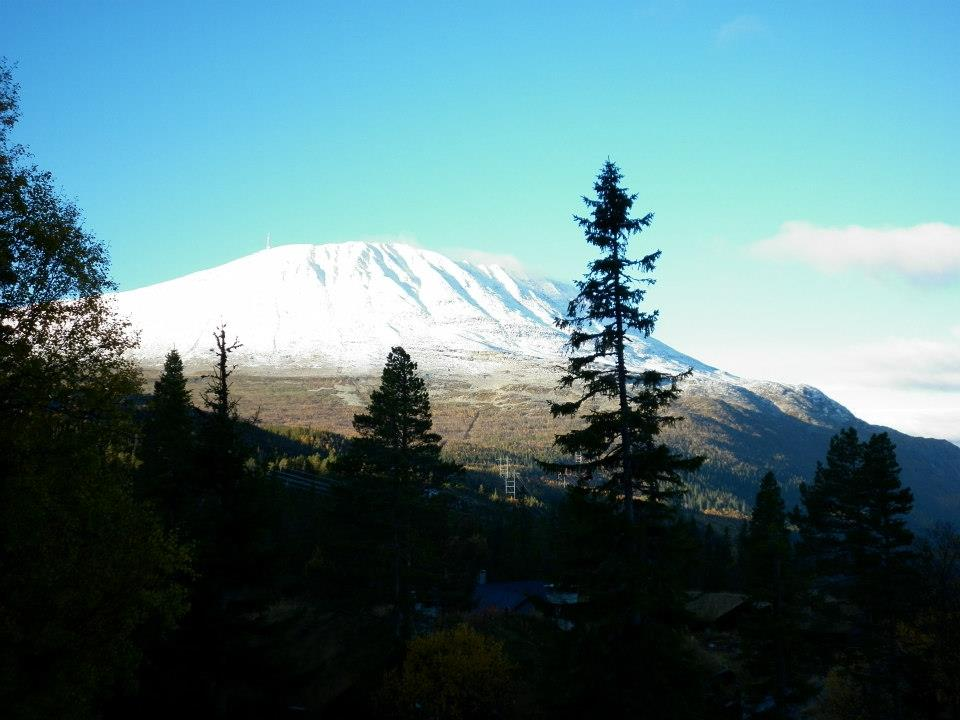
Gaustatoppen view

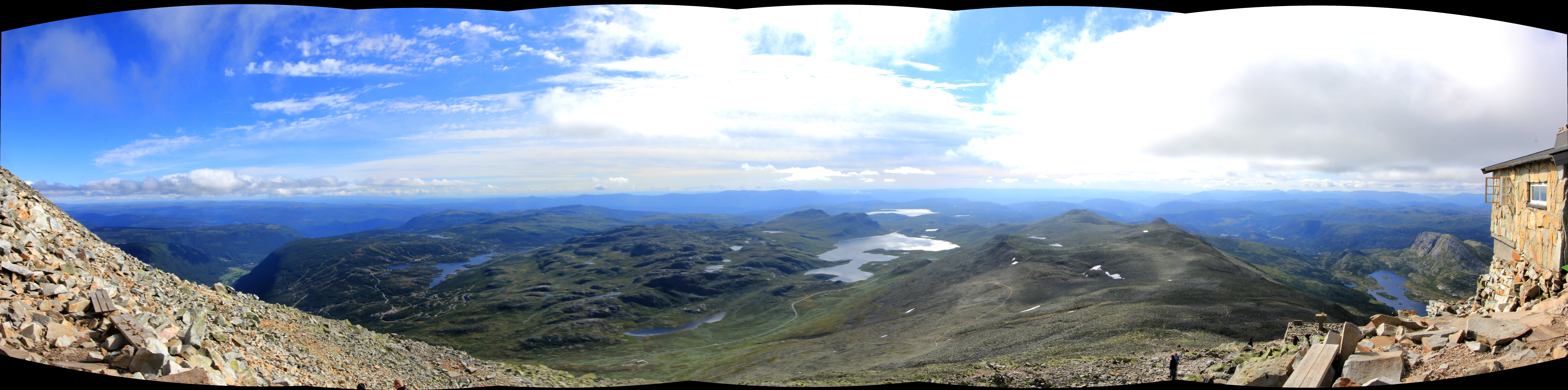
Gaustatoppen 360 degree photo

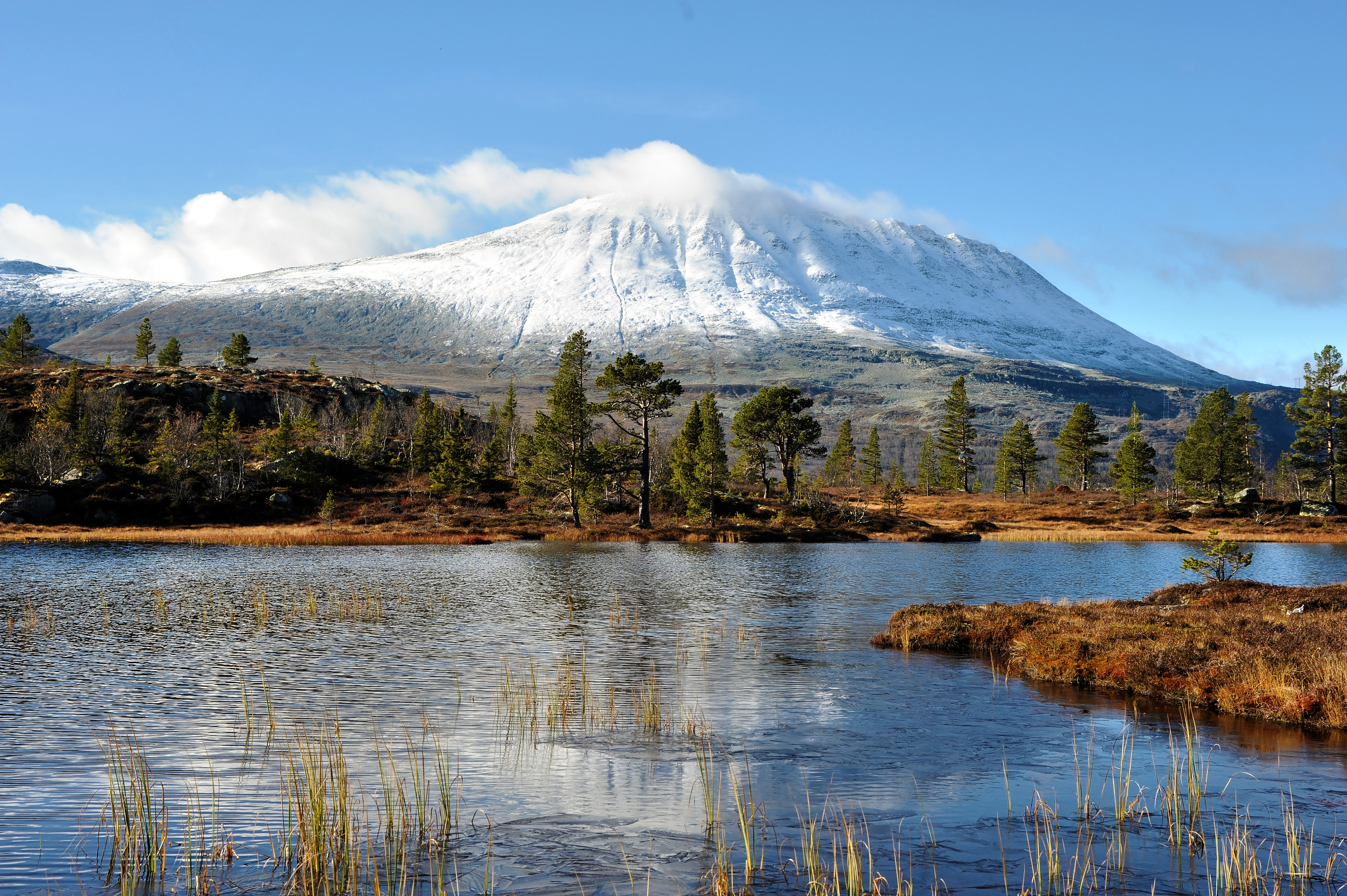
Gaustatoppen

== See also ==
- List of highest points of Norwegian counties
