= Okstindbreen =

Glacier in Hemnes, Norway

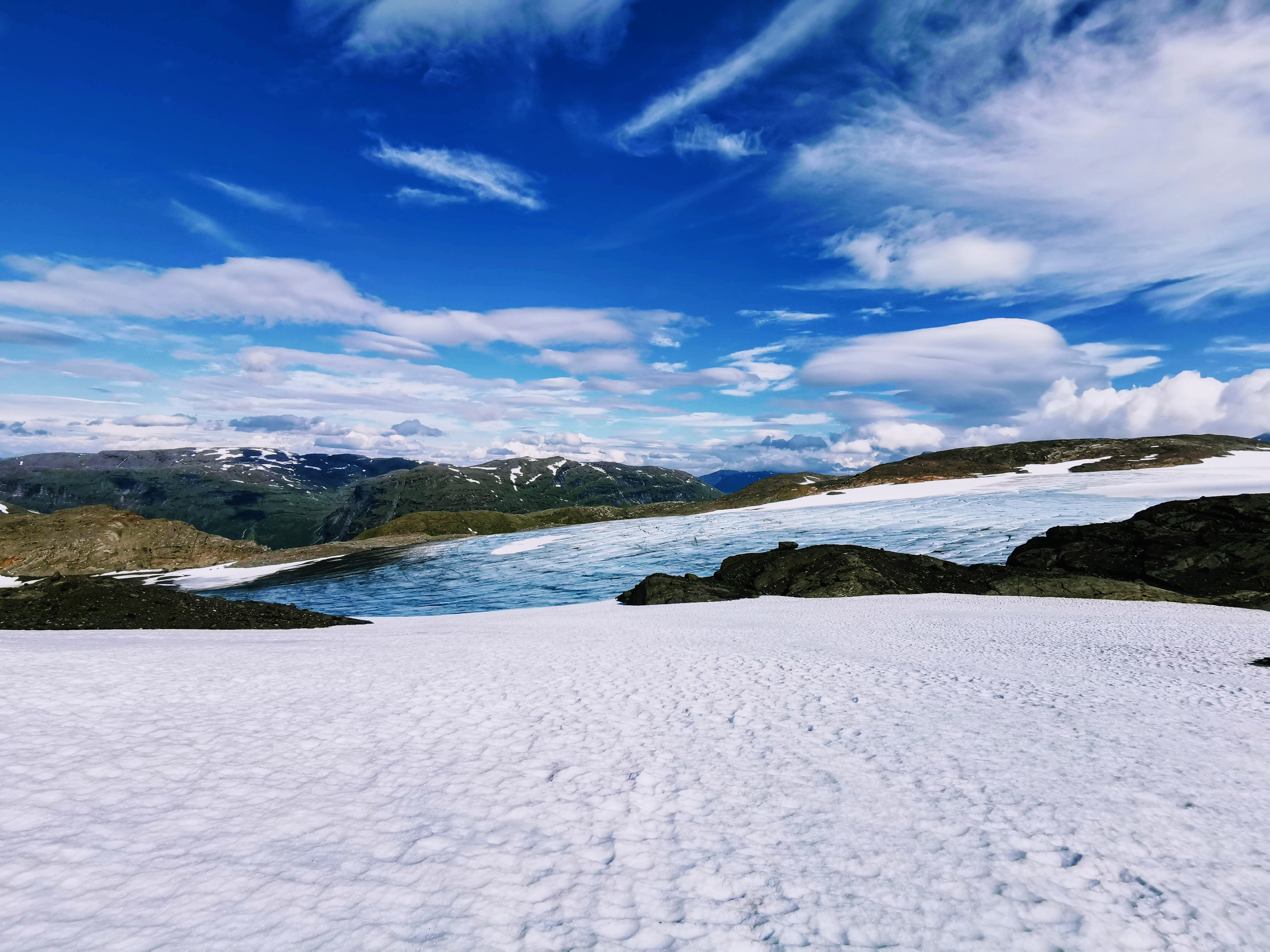
- View of the westside glacier tongue
- Interactive map of the glacier
- Location: Hemnes Municipality, Nordland, Norway
- Coordinates: 65.9874°N 14.1481°E
- Area: 36.9 km^{2} (14.2 sq mi) (2022)
- Highest elevation: 1,740 metres (5,710 ft)
- Lowest elevation: 750 metres (2,460 ft)

Okstindbreen is the eighth-largest glacier in mainland Norway. Okstindbreen is also the largest of the 19 glaciers in the Okstindan area, which together covered about 46 km² in 2010. The area of Okstindbreen itself decreased by 31% over 10 years, from 53.6 km² in 2012 to 36.9 km² in 2022.

Okstindbreen comprises an ice field including Vestisen, Vestre Okstindbreen, Austre Okstindbreen, Bessedørbreen, Steikvassbreen, Vestre Svartfjellbreen, and Oksfjellbreen. The largest outlet glacier from Okstindbreen is Austre Okstindbreen, measured to be 14 km² in 1996. It drains towards the valley Oksfjelldalen, located northeast of Oksskolten, the highest mountain in Northern Norway.

== See also ==
- List of glaciers in Norway
