= Hallingskarvet =

Mountain range in southern Norway

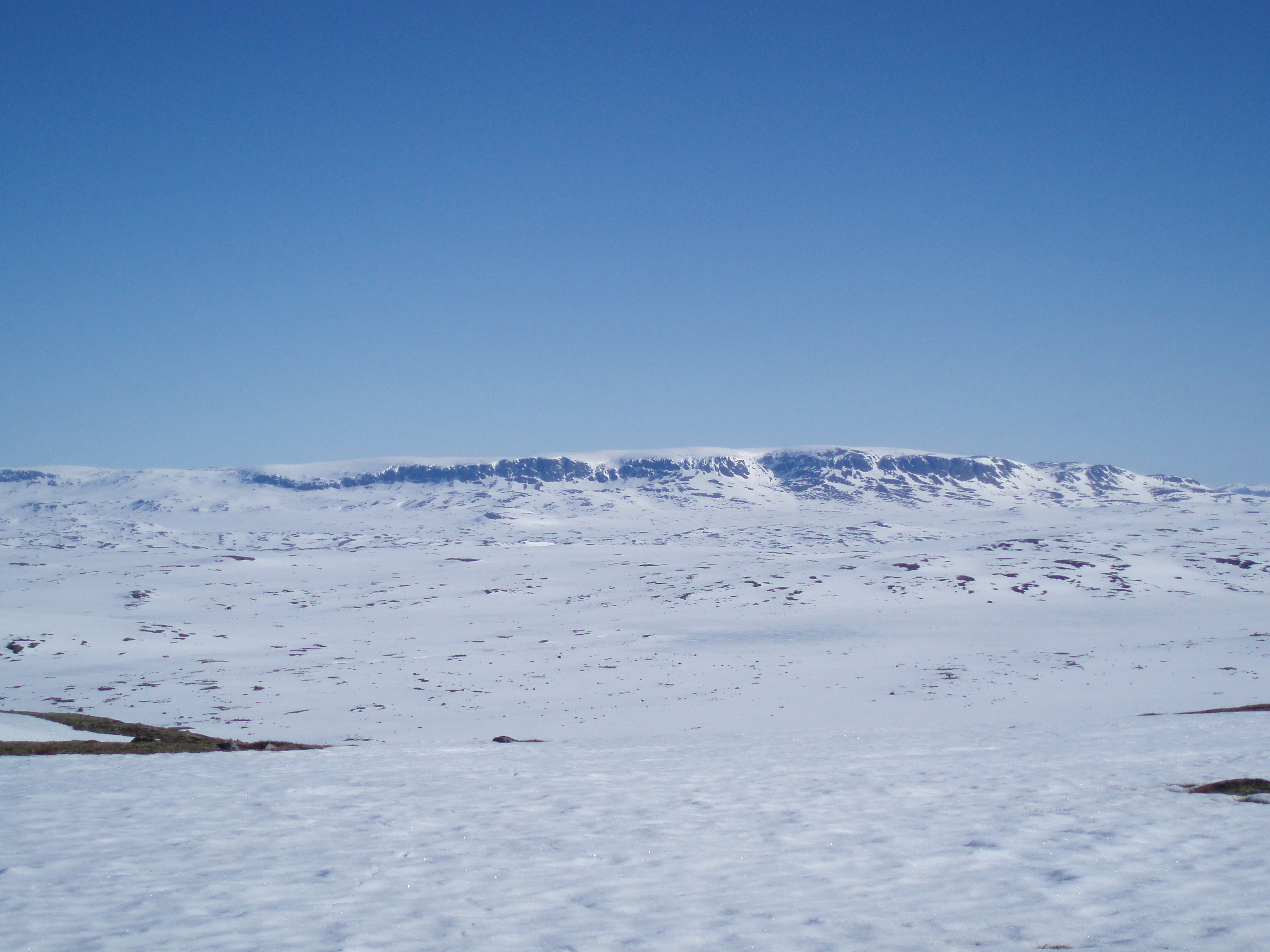

Highest point
- Peak: Folarskardnuten, Hol Municipality, Buskerud
- Elevation: 1,933 m (6,342 ft)
- Coordinates: 60.61278°N 7.78611°E

Dimensions
- Length: 35 km (22 mi)

Geography
- Location: Vestland and Buskerud, Norway
- Range coordinates: 60.60482°N 7.68701°E

Hallingskarvet is a mountain range in southern Norway stretching from Geilo to Finse in Vestland and Buskerud counties. The highest point is the 1,933-metre (6,342 ft) tall mountain Folarskardnuten in Hol Municipality in Buskerud county. The mountains run through Aurland Municipality and Ulvik Municipality in Vestland county and Hol Municipality in Buskerud county.

In the north, there is a large dammed lake called Strandavatnet. The Bergen Line railway, which runs south of Hallingskarvet, has its highest stop at Finse Station at an elevation of 1,222 metres (4,009 ft).

In 2006, the Hallingskarvet mountain range became part of the Hallingskarvet National Park.

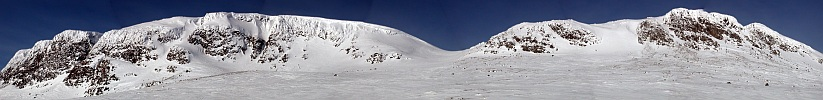
Prestholtskarvet, eastern part of Hallingskarvet seen from the south

== See also ==
- List of mountains of Norway
