= Venset =

Village in Fauske Municipality, Norway

- Village
- Interactive map of Venset
- Location within Nordland Location within Norway
- Coordinates: 67.2570°N 15.1909°E
- Country: Norway
- Region: Northern Norway
- County: Nordland
- District: Salten
- Municipality: Fauske Municipality
- Elevation: 6 m (20 ft)
- Time zone: UTC+01:00 (CET)
  - Summer (DST): UTC+02:00 (CEST)
- Post Code: 8200 Fauske

Venset is a village in Fauske Municipality in Nordland county, Norway. Venset lies on the north shore of Skjerstad Fjord about 17 kilometers (11 mi) west of the town of Fauske and about 6 kilometres (3.7 mi) south of the village of Valnesfjord.

== Transportation ==
Norwegian County Road 530 passes through the village. The route was formerly part of Norwegian National Road 80 which runs from the town of Fauske to the town of Bodø until 2011 when the Røvik Tunnel came into service.

== History ==
In 1858, the farmer Mons Petter brought the ore that he had found near the village of Sulitjelma to Venset, where it was examined by the merchant Bernhard Koch. This led to the establishment of Sulitjelma Mines (Norwegian: Sulitjelma gruber), which began operations in 1891.
