= Røvik Tunnel =

Road tunnel in Fauske, Norway

- Interactive map of Røvik Tunnel

Overview
- Location: Fauske Municipality, Nordland, Norway
- Coordinates: 67°17′01″N 15°13′40″E
- Route: Rv80
- Start: Røvik
- End: Valnesfjord

Operation
- Opened: 2011
- Traffic: Automotive

Technical
- Length: 2,040 meters (6,690 ft)

The Røvik Tunnel (Norwegian: Røviktunnelen) is a road tunnel that is part of Norwegian National Road 80 in Fauske Municipality in Nordland county, Norway. It runs parallel to the Nordland Line between Røvik and Valnesfjord, just west of the town of Fauske.

Before the tunnel was opened on August 30, 2011, National Road 80 used to continue along Skjerstad Fjord through Venset, then turning north to Valnesfjord. The old route is now Norwegian County Road 530. The tunnel shortened the distance between Bodø and Fauske by 6.2 kilometers (3.9 mi).
