= Fauske =

Fauske may refer to:

== Places ==
- Fauske Municipality, a municipality in Nordland county, Norway
- Fauske (town), a town within Fauske Municipality in Nordland county, Norway
- Fauske Church, a church in Fauske Municipality in Nordland county, Norway

== People ==
- Helene Gigstad Fauske (born 1997), a Norwegian handball player
- Reidar Fauske Sognnaes (1911-1984), a scholar in the field of oral pathology

== Other ==
- Fauske Lysverk, a power company based in Fauske Municipality in Nordland county, Norway
- FK Fauske/Sprint, a sports club based in Fauske Municipality in Nordland county, Norway
