= Nystad, Nordland =

Village in Fauske Municipality, Norway

Nystad
- Village
- Interactive map of Nystad
- Location within Nordland Location within Norway
- Coordinates: 67.3291°N 15.2653°E
- Country: Norway
- Region: Northern Norway
- County: Nordland
- District: Salten
- Municipality: Fauske Municipality
- Elevation: 10 m (33 ft)
- Time zone: UTC+01:00 (CET)
  - Summer (DST): UTC+02:00 (CEST)
- Post Code: 8215 Valnesfjord

Nystad is a small village in Fauske Municipality in Nordland county, Norway. It is located about 7 kilometres (4.3 mi) north of the village of Straumsnes, along the northeastern shore of the lake Valnesfjordvatnet. The town of Fauske is located about 10 kilometres (6.2 mi) southeast of Nystad.
