= Nystad =

Nystad may refer to:

== Places ==
- Nystad, Nordland, a village in Fauske, Nordland county, Norway
- The town and municipality in Finland called Nystad (Swedish) or Uusikaupunki (Finnish)

== People ==
- Claudia Nystad, a German top-level female cross-country skier

== Other ==
- Treaty of Nystad, the last peace treaty of the Great Northern War
