= Jakobsbakken =

Village in Fauske Municipality, Norway

- Village
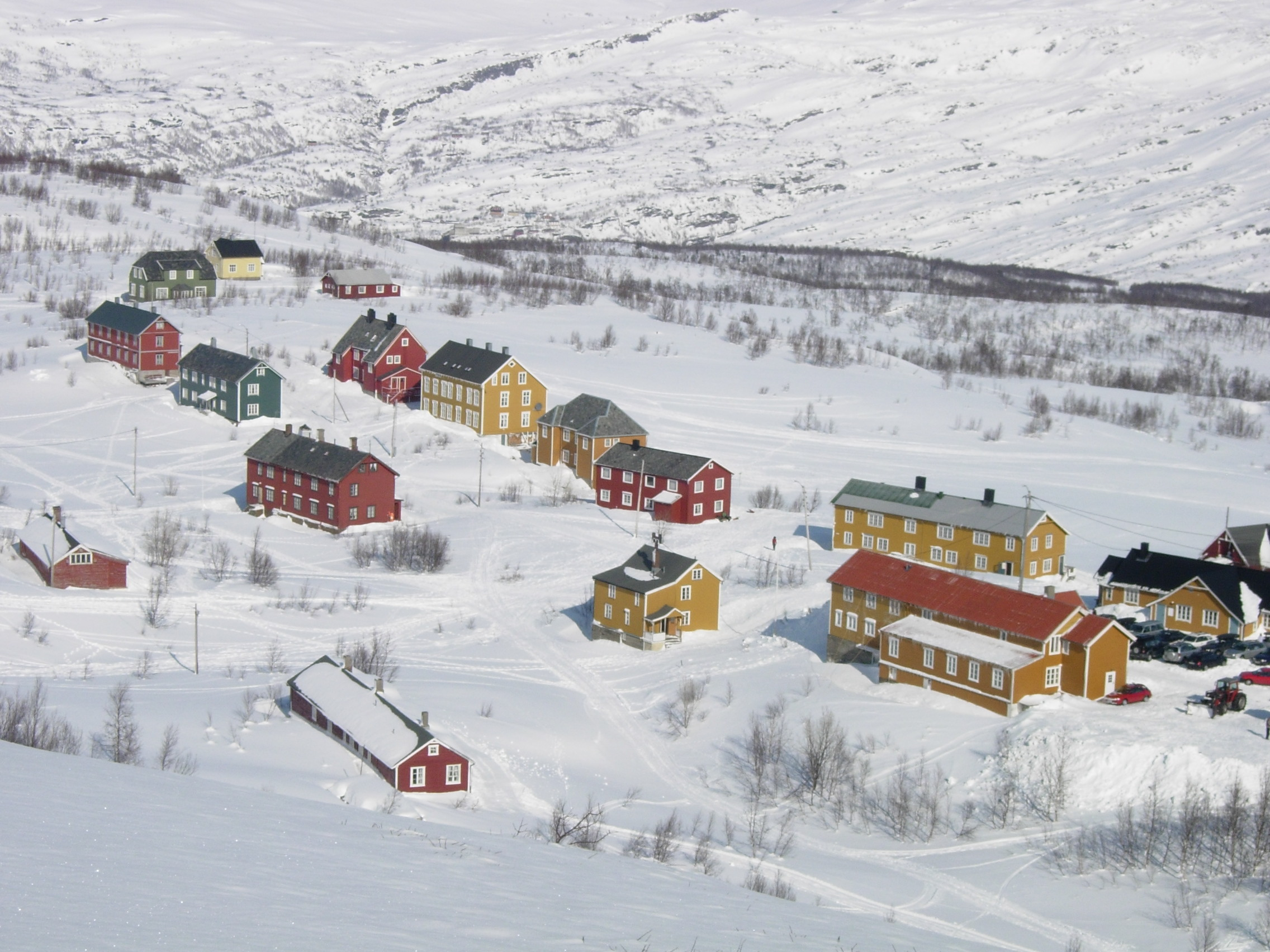
- View of the village
- Interactive map of Jakobsbakken
- Location within Nordland Location within Norway
- Coordinates: 67.09504°N 16.00602°E
- Region: Northern Norway
- County: Nordland
- District: Salten
- Municipality: Fauske Municipality
- Elevation: 594 m (1,949 ft)
- Time zone: UTC+01:00 (CET)
  - Summer (DST): UTC+02:00 (CEST)
- Post Code: 8230 Sulitjelma

Jakobsbakken (locally known as Bakken) is a small clustered village area in Fauske Municipality in Nordland county, Norway. The village no longer has any permanent residents, but it historically was a mining village. The village is situated south of Lake Langvatnet, about 8 kilometres (5.0 mi) south of the village of Sulitjelma, just above the tree line at an elevation of 600 meters (2,000 ft).

== Mine ==
Jakobsbakken Mine
- Products: Copper, zinc
- Production: 4.47 million tons of ore
- Type: Underground
- Opened: 1896
- Closed: 1968
- Company: Sulitjelma Gruber A/S

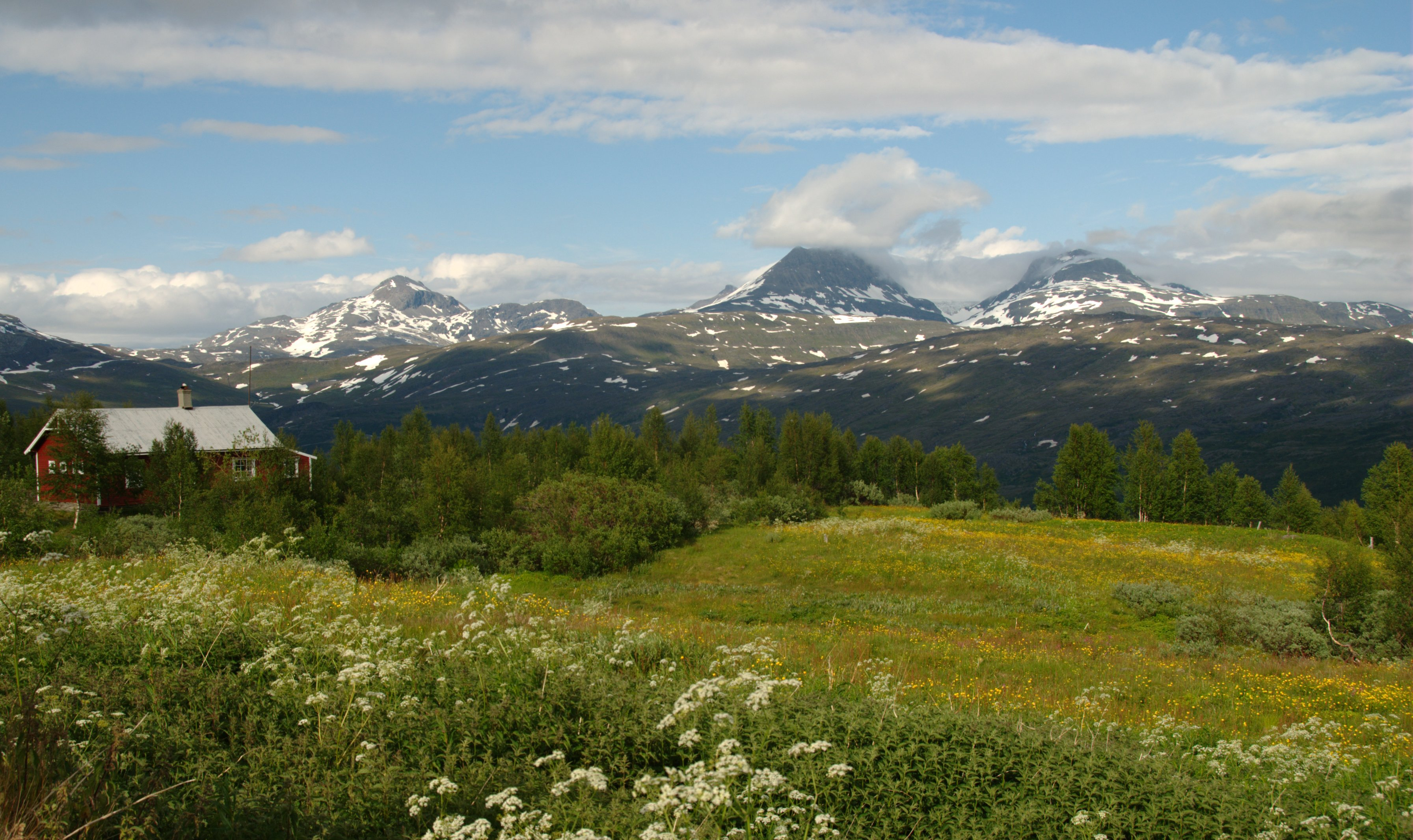
Early July in the highlands at Jakobsbakken

Historically, this village was associated with the Norwegian mining company Sulitjelma Gruber. Ore deposits were discovered at the site in the mid-1870s, but systematic investigations were not carried out until 1886. Swedish entrepreneur Nils Persson (1836–1916) acquired eight sites in the Sulitjelma area. In 1891, Sulitjelma Gruber was formed. Telephone service was established in 1891 and postal service was established in 1913.

The transport of ore took place on an aerial tramway down to Sulitjelma. Jakobsbakken was by far the richest single deposit in Sulitjelma field. The area has numerous ore minerals, and at least 23 have been identified. The Jakobsbakken mine operated from 1896 to 1968 during which time 4.47 million tons of copper and zinc ore were extracted.

After the closure of the mine in 1968, the village area of the mining community was purchased by the Norwegian Lutheran Mission and the mine and mining facilities were razed or walled up.
