= Nervatnet (Fauske) =

Lake in Fauske, Norway

- Nedrevatnet
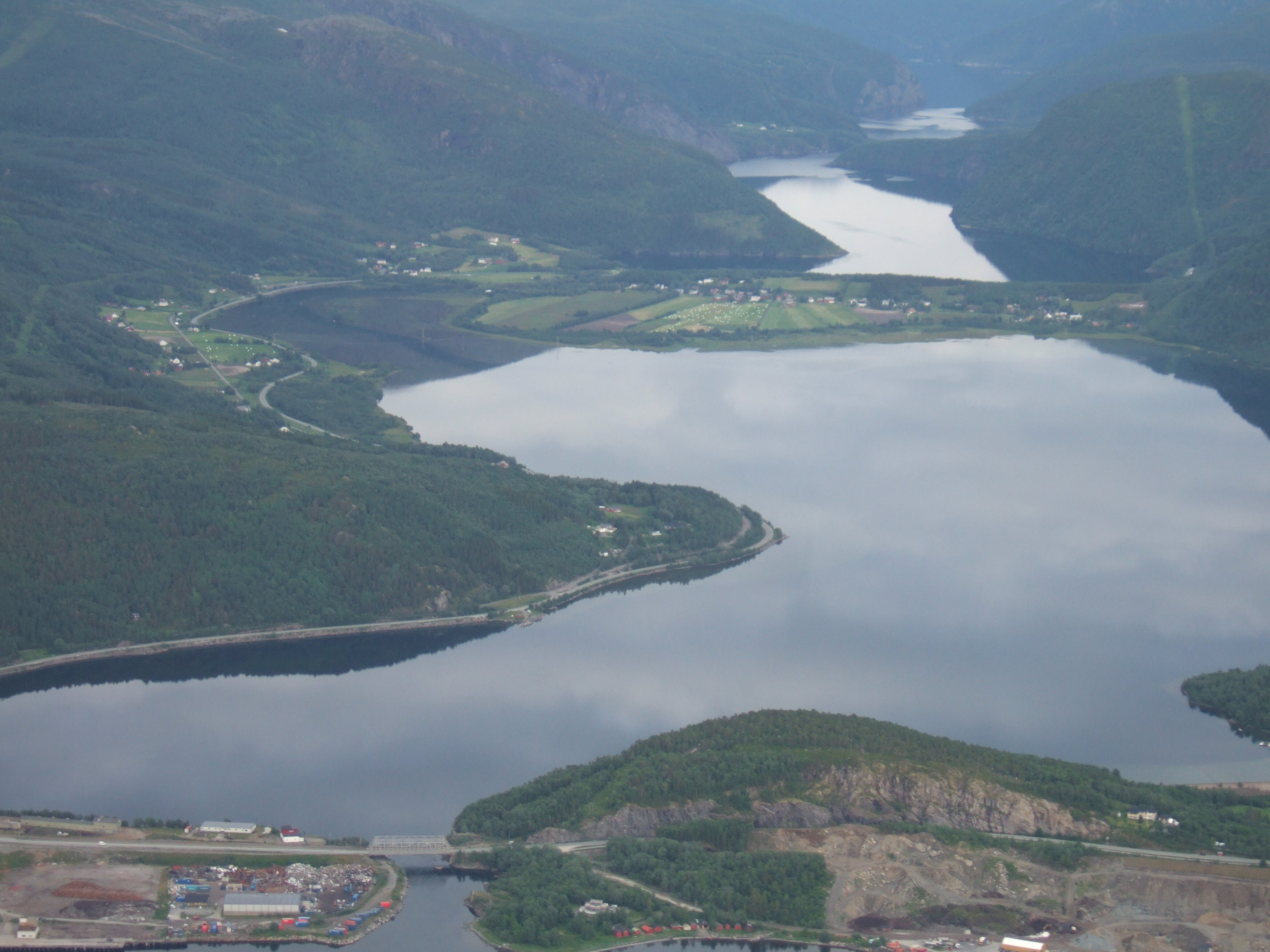
- Nervatnet viewed from above, 2015
- Interactive map of the lake
- Location: Fauske Municipality, Nordland
- Coordinates: 67.2396°N 15.4624°E
- Basin countries: Norway
- Max. length: 4.1 kilometres (2.5 mi)
- Max. width: 2.9 kilometres (1.8 mi)
- Surface area: 4.8 km^{2} (1.9 sq mi)
- Shore length^{1}: 14.06 kilometres (8.74 mi)
- Surface elevation: 0 metres (0 ft)
- References: NVE
- ^{1} Shore length is not a well-defined measure.

Nervatnet is a lake that lies in Fauske Municipality in Nordland county, Norway. The 4.8-square-kilometre (1.9 sq mi) lake lies just east of the town of Fauske. The neighboring lake Øvervatnet flows into Nedrevatnet, whose water in turn flows out into the Skjerstad Fjord. The E6 highway and the Nordland Line run along the western edge of this lake.

== See also ==
- List of lakes in Norway
- Geography of Norway
