= Jacob Jervell =

Theologian, professor emeritus, author, priest (1925–2014)

Jacob Stephan Jervell (21 May 1925 – 2 March 2014) was a Norwegian theologian, professor emeritus, author and priest.

== Biography ==
Jervell was born in Fauske Municipality in Nordland county, Norway. He was the son of Sverre Jervell (1882–1955) and Thora Mejdell (1889–1988). His father was a parish priest. Jervell grew up in Bergen, Stavanger and Hamar. He graduated artium at Hamar Cathedral School in 1944. After a year as a teacher at Andøya, he began studying theology at the University of Oslo in 1945, where he became Cand.theol. in 1951. He studied in Germany from 1953 to 1955. He was awarded his D.Theol. in 1959.

He was a professor of theology at the University of Oslo a position he held until 1988. He was dean of the Faculty of Theology and chairman of the Theology Seminar 1975–76. He was a prorector at the University of Oslo from 1977 to 1980. He held positions at several foreign universities: Lund University, 1963–64, Yale University, 1970 and Aarhus University, 1973. He was Professor at the University of Tromsø from 1997 to 2000.

Jervell held a number of positions in Christian and nonprofit organizations. He served as chairman of the Norwegian Christian Student Movement 1958-65 and was a member of the central government in the Norwegian Bible Society 1966–75. Jervell was also a member of the Norwegian Academy of Science and Letters. In 2000, he was appointed a knight of the 1st grade of the Order of St. Olav.

He died on 2 March 2014 from natural causes. His wife died only four weeks later.

== Selected works ==
- Den historiske Jesus, 1962
- Da fremtiden begynte. Om urkristendommens tro og tenkning, 1967
- Luke and the people of God. A new look at Luke-Acts, 1972
- Gud og hans fiender. Forsøk på å tolke Romerbrevet, 1973
- The Unknown Paul. Essays on Luke-Acts and Early Christian History, 1984
- Det moralske Norge. Om samfunnsmoral, 1991
- The Theology of the Acts of the Apostles, 1996
- Die Apostelgeschichte, 1998
