= Valnesfjord Church =

Church in Nordland, Norway

- Valnesfjord kirke
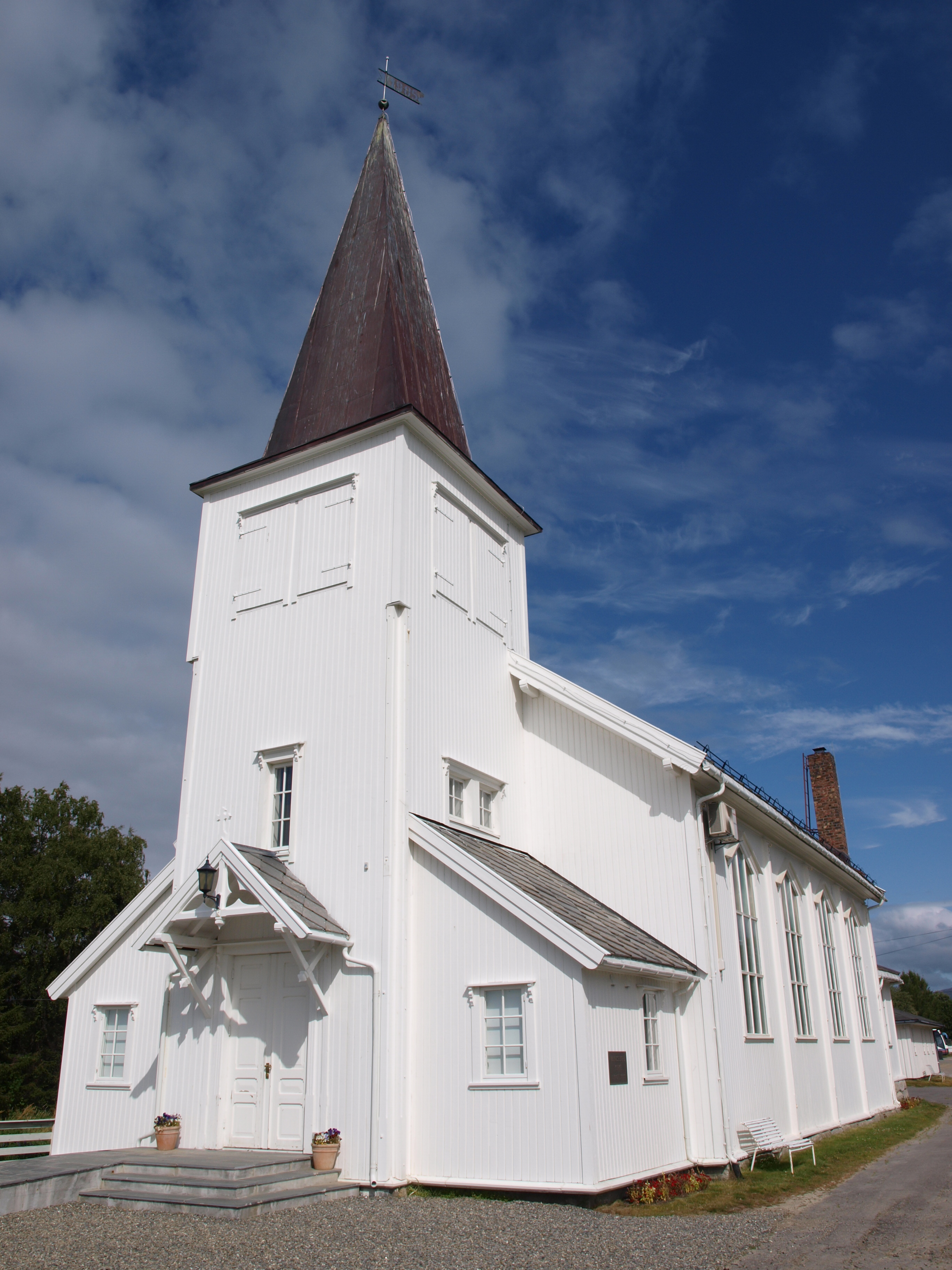
- View of the church
- Valnesfjord Church
- 67.2927119°N 15.1738572°E
- Location: Fauske Municipality, Nordland
- Country: Norway
- Denomination: Church of Norway
- Churchmanship: Evangelical Lutheran

History
- Status: Parish church
- Founded: 1905
- Consecrated: 14 June 1905

Architecture
- Functional status: Active
- Architect: K. Tessem
- Architectural type: Long church
- Completed: 1905 (121 years ago)

Specifications
- Capacity: 250
- Materials: Wood

Administration
- Diocese: Sør-Hålogaland
- Deanery: Salten prosti
- Parish: Valnesfjord
- Norwegian Cultural Heritage Site
- Type: Church
- Status: Not protected
- ID: 85754

Valnesfjord Church (Norwegian: Valnesfjord kirke) is a parish church of the Church of Norway in Fauske Municipality in Nordland county, Norway. It is located in the village of Straumsnes. It is the church for the Valnesfjord parish which is part of the Salten prosti (deanery) in the Diocese of Sør-Hålogaland. The white, wooden church was built in a long church style in 1905, using plans drawn up by the architect K. Tessem. The church seats about 250 people. The building was consecrated on 14 June 1905 by the Bishop Peter Wilhelm Bøckman.

== Media gallery ==
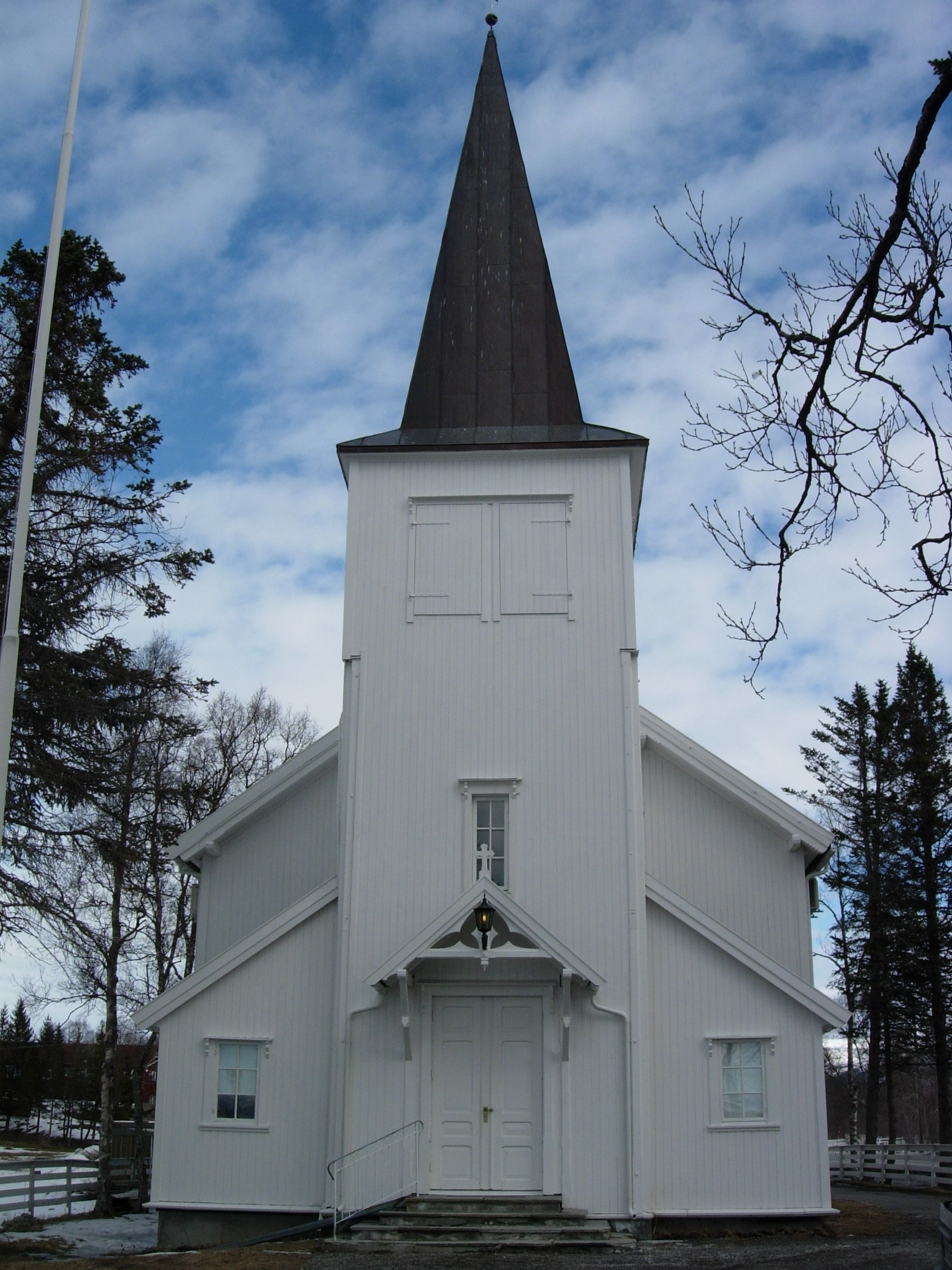

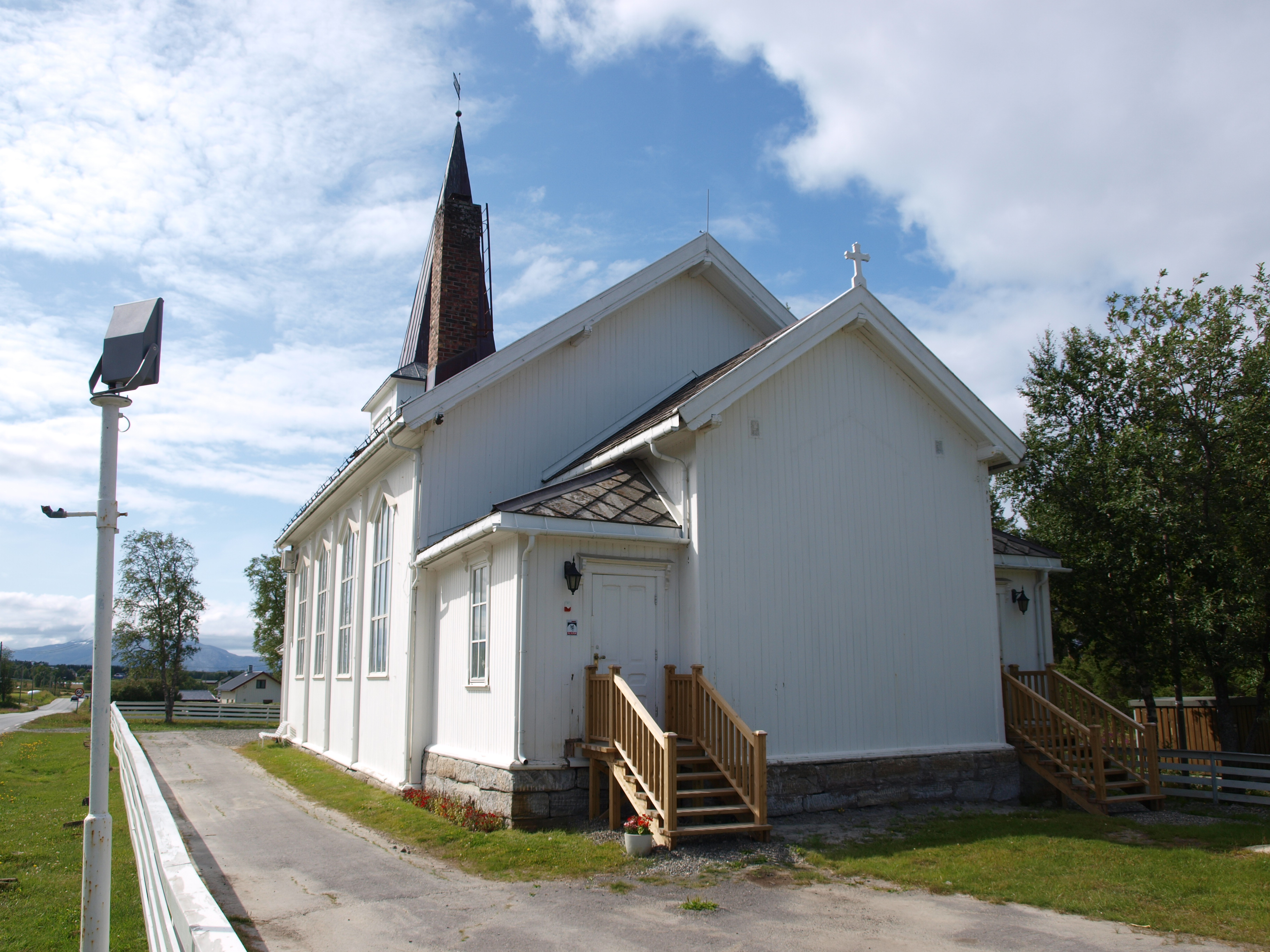

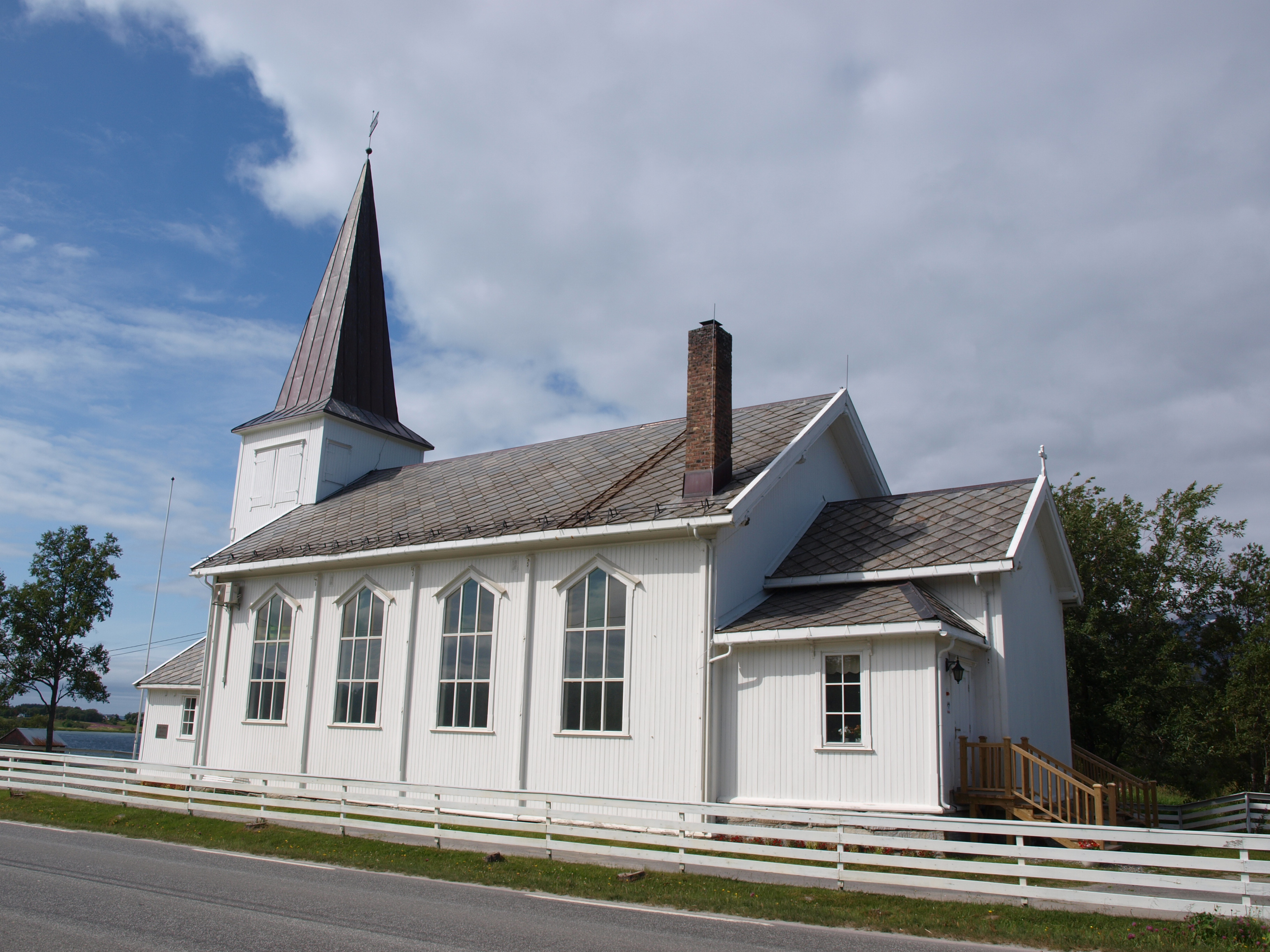

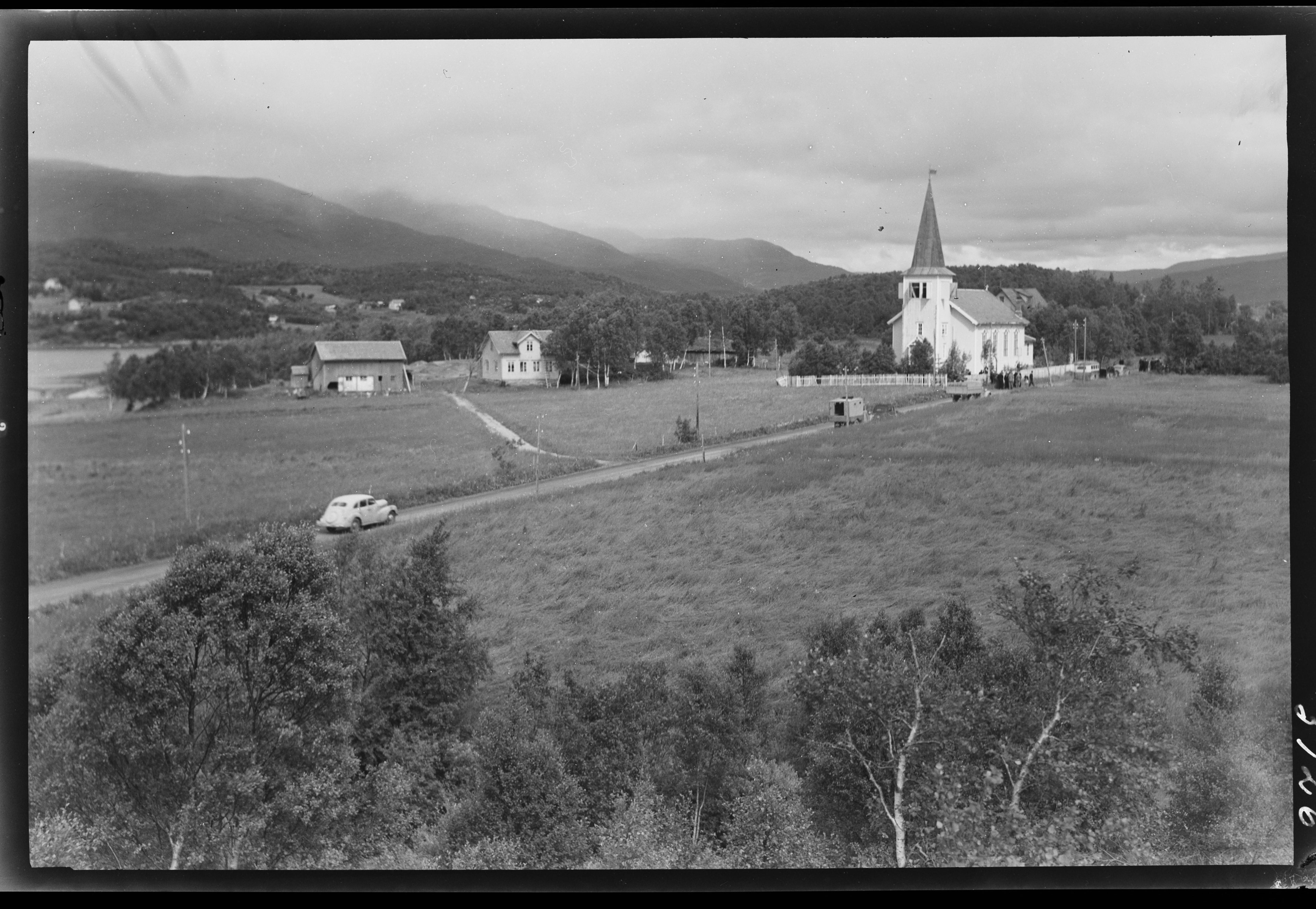

== See also ==
- List of churches in Sør-Hålogaland
