= Muorkkejávrre =

Lake in Fauske, Norway

Eidevatnet (Norwegian); Muorkkejávrre (Lule Sami)
- Sulitjelma Glacier and the lakes Låmivatnet and Muorkkejávrre
- Interactive map of the lake
- Location: Fauske Municipality, Nordland
- Coordinates: 67.0703°N 16.3304°E
- Basin countries: Norway
- Max. length: 5.7 kilometres (3.5 mi)
- Max. width: 1.9 kilometres (1.2 mi)
- Surface area: 5.94 km^{2} (2.29 sq mi)
- Shore length^{1}: 18 kilometres (11 mi)
- Surface elevation: 712 metres (2,336 ft)
- References: NVE
- ^{1} Shore length is not a well-defined measure.

Muorkkejávrre (Lule Sami) or Eidevatnet (Norwegian) is a lake that lies in Fauske Municipality in Nordland county, Norway. The 5.94-square-kilometre (2.29 sq mi) lake lies about 75 metres (246 ft) west of the border with Sweden and about 10 kilometres (6.2 mi) east of the village of Sulitjelma. The water from the lake flows west into the neighboring lake Låmivatnet. The ending -jávrre is the Lule Sami word for "lake".

== See also ==
- List of lakes in Norway
- Geography of Norway
