= Anne Stenhammer =

Norwegian politician

Anne Margareth Fagertun Stenhammer (born 28 August 1950) is a Norwegian politician for the Socialist Left Party.

From October 2005 to November 2007, during the second cabinet Stoltenberg, Stenhammer was appointed State Secretary in the Ministry of Foreign Affairs.

On the local level, she was the mayor of Fauske Municipality from 1991 to 1999.
