= Straumsnes, Fauske =

Village in Fauske Municipality, Norway

Straumsnes Strømsnes / Valnesfjord
- Village
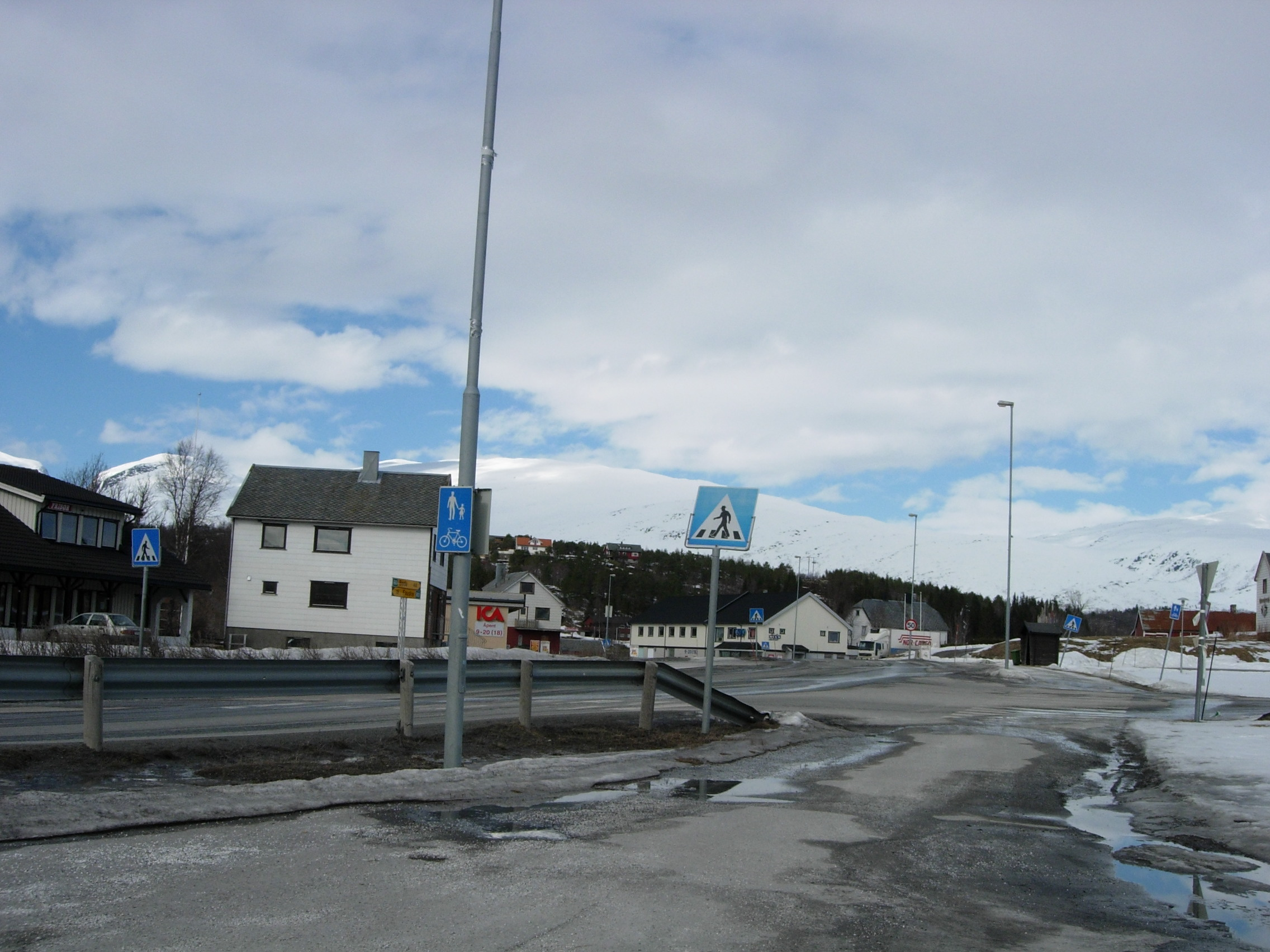
- View of the village
- Interactive map of Straumsnes
- Location within Nordland Location within Norway
- Coordinates: 67.2995°N 15.1856°E
- Country: Norway
- Region: Northern Norway
- County: Nordland
- District: Salten
- Municipality: Fauske Municipality

Area
  - Total: 0.63 km^{2} (0.24 sq mi)
- Elevation: 7 m (23 ft)

Population (2023)
  - Total: 460
  - Density: 730/km^{2} (1,900/sq mi)
- Time zone: UTC+01:00 (CET)
  - Summer (DST): UTC+02:00 (CEST)
- Post Code: 8215 Valnesfjord

Straumsnes or Valnesfjord is a village in Fauske Municipality in Nordland county, Norway. It is located in the Valnesfjord area of Fauske. The town of Fauske lies 15 kilometres (9.3 mi) to the east and the town of Bodø 40 kilometres (25 mi) to the west. The village sits just inland of Skjerstad Fjord, along the southern shore of the lake Valnesfjordvatnet.

The 0.63-square-kilometre (160-acre) village has a population (2023) of 460 and a population density of 730 inhabitants per square kilometre (1,900/sq mi). Valnesfjord Church is located on the southern side of the village area. The white, wooden structure from 1905 is the church for the Valnesfjord parish.
