= Fauske Church =

Church in Nordland, Norway

- Fauske kirke
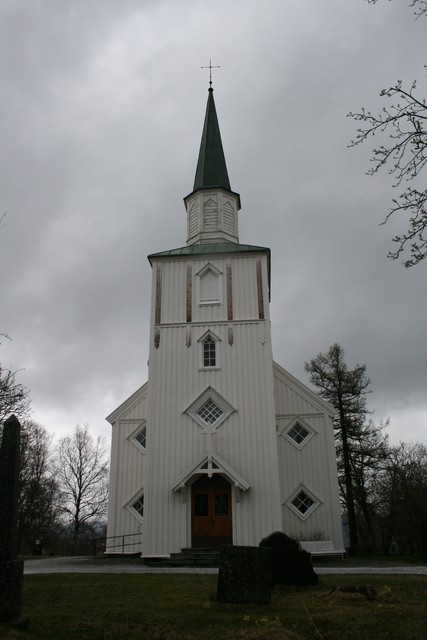
- View of the church
- Fauske Church
- 67.2578942°N 15.3726746°E
- Location: Fauske Municipality, Nordland
- Country: Norway
- Denomination: Church of Norway
- Churchmanship: Evangelical Lutheran

History
- Status: Parish church
- Founded: 1869
- Consecrated: 5 Aug 1869

Architecture
- Functional status: Active
- Architect: B. Sneve
- Architectural type: Long church
- Completed: 1869 (157 years ago)

Specifications
- Capacity: 280
- Materials: Wood

Administration
- Diocese: Sør-Hålogaland
- Deanery: Salten prosti
- Parish: Fauske
- Norwegian Cultural Heritage Site
- Type: Church
- Status: Not protected
- ID: 84118

Fauske Church (Norwegian: Fauske kirke) is a parish church of the Church of Norway in Fauske Municipality in Nordland county, Norway. It is located in the town of Fauske. It is the church for the Fauske parish which is part of the Salten prosti (deanery) in the Diocese of Sør-Hålogaland. The white, wooden church was built in a long church style in 1869 using plans drawn up by the architect B. Sneve. The church seats about 280 people.

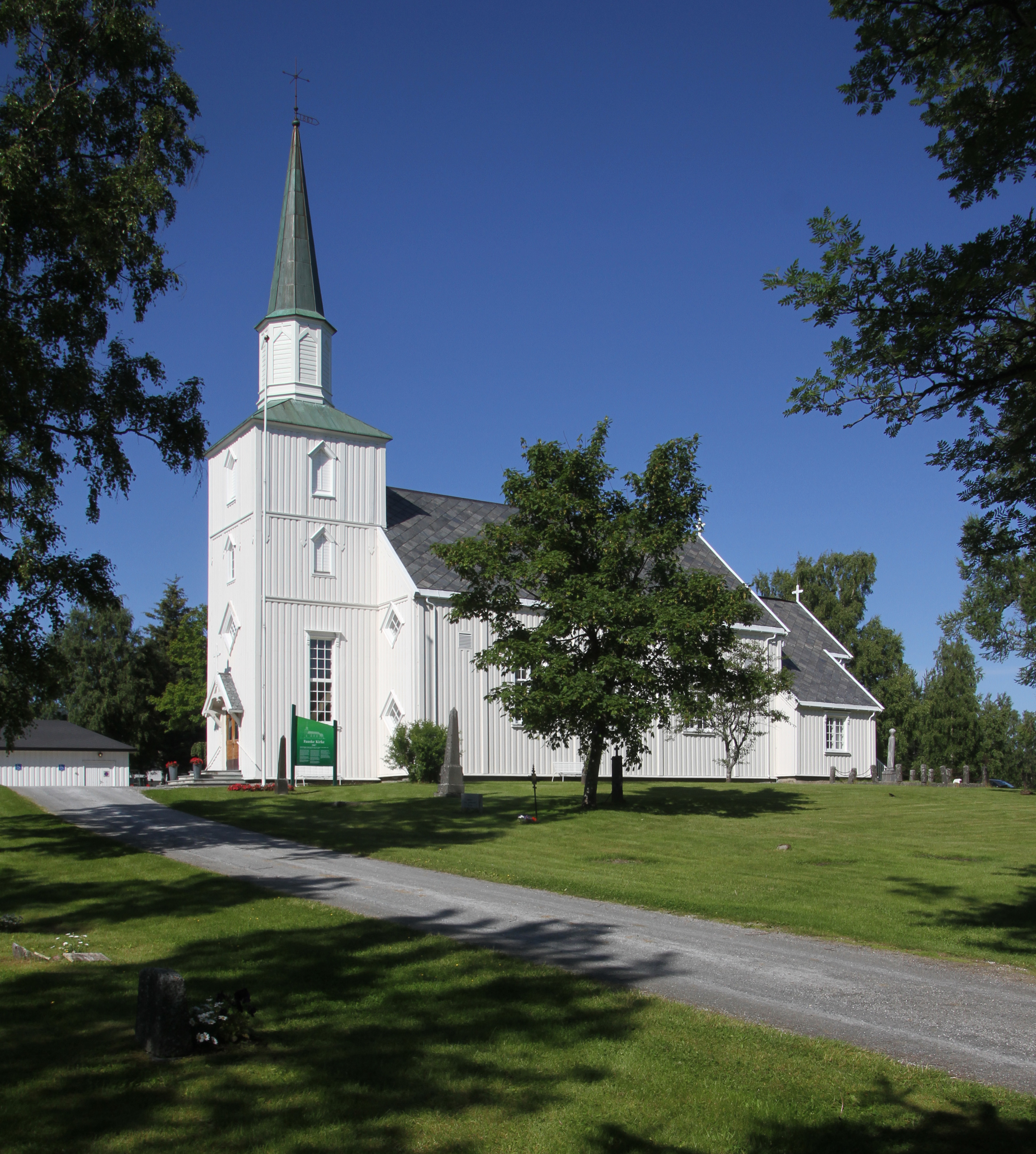

== History ==
The people of the Fauske area first petitioned the King for a church in their village in 1841. At that time, Skjerstad Church was the main church for the area, but that was a distance away, across a large fjord. After about 20 years of discussions, requests, and committee meetings debating whether or not to have the church and if so, who would pay for it. In 1861, the local municipal council voted to recommend the construction of a church in Fauske. On 25 January 1866, the parish received royal permission to construct the church. The church building was completed in August of 1867, but the church was not taken into use and consecrated for 2 years. During this time, the interior furniture and decorations were installed, a graveyard was constructed around the building, as well as a neighboring building for the priest to live in. The new church was consecrated on 5 August 1869 by the Bishop Waldemar Hvoslef.

== See also ==
- List of churches in Sør-Hålogaland
