= Fauske Municipality =

Municipality in Nordland, Norway

Fauske Municipality Fauske kommune Fuosko suohkan
- Municipality
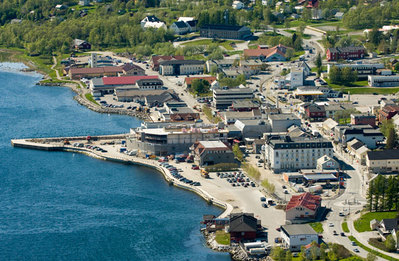
- View of Fauske sentrum

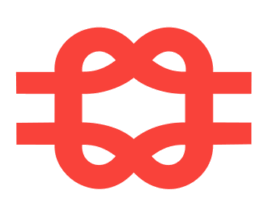
- Flag Coat of arms

- Nordland within Norway

- Fauske within Nordland
- Coordinates: 67°13′14″N 15°48′31″E
- Country: Norway
- County: Nordland
- District: Salten
- Established: 1 Jan 1905
  - Preceded by: Skjerstad Municipality
- Administrative centre: Fauske

Government
  - Mayor (2019): Marlen Rendall Berg (Sp)

Area
  - Total: 1,196.98 km^{2} (462.16 sq mi)
  - Land: 1,107.88 km^{2} (427.75 sq mi)
  - Water: 90.10 km^{2} (34.79 sq mi) 7.5%
  - Rank: #90 in Norway
- Highest elevation: 1,907.16 m (6,257.1 ft)

Population (2024)
  - Total: 9,827
  - Rank: #116 in Norway
  - Density: 8.2/km^{2} (21/sq mi)
  - Change (10 years): ▲ +2.8%
- Demonym(s): Fauskeværing; Fauskværing

Official language
  - Norwegian form: Bokmål
- Time zone: UTC+01:00 (CET)
  - Summer (DST): UTC+02:00 (CEST)
- ISO 3166 code: NO-1841
- Website: Official website

Fauske (Norwegian pronunciation) or Fuossko (Lule Sami) is a municipality located in Nordland county, Norway. It is part of the traditional district of Salten. The administrative centre of the municipality is the town of Fauske. Some of the villages in Fauske include Nystad, Venset, Straumsnes, Sjønstå, Valnesfjord, Finneid, and Sulitjelma.

The municipality borders Sweden in the east, Sørfold Municipality to the north, Bodø Municipality to the west, and Saltdal Municipality to the southeast. The town is located on the northern shore of Skjerstad Fjord.

The 1,197-square-kilometre (462 sq mi) municipality is the 90th largest by area out of the 357 municipalities in Norway. Fauske Municipality is the 116th most populous municipality in Norway with a population of 9,827. The municipality's population density is 8.2 inhabitants per square kilometre (21/sq mi) and its population has increased by 2.8% over the previous 10-year period.

== General information ==
The municipality was established on 1 January 1905 when the old, large Skjerstad Municipality was divided into a smaller Skjerstad Municipality (population: 1,709) in the west and Fauske Municipality (population: 4,646) in the east. The municipal borders haven't changed since that time. In 1998, the municipality declared town status for its administrative centre, the town of Fauske.

=== Name ===
The municipality (originally the parish) is named after the old Fauske farm (Old Norse: Fauskar) since the first Fauske Church was built there in 1867. The name is the plural form of fauskr which means "old and rotten tree".

On 15 April 2016, the national government approved a resolution to add a co-equal, official Sami language name for the municipality: Fuossko. The spelling of the Sami language name changes depending on how it is used. It is called Fuossko when it is spelled alone, but it is Fuosko suohkan when using the Sami language equivalent to "Fauske municipality".

=== Coat of arms ===
The coat of arms was granted on 22 July 1988. The official blazon is "Argent, a reef knot gules" (Norwegian: I sølv en liggende rød båtmannsknute). This means the arms have a field (background) that has a tincture of argent which means it is commonly colored white, but if it is made out of metal, then silver is used. The charge is a red reef knot. It was chosen to represent Fauske as a center of commerce and transportation for the region. The arms were designed by Stein Davidsen.

=== Churches ===
The Church of Norway has three parishes (sokn) within Fauske Municipality. It is part of the Salten prosti (deanery) in the Diocese of Sør-Hålogaland.

Churches in Fauske Municipality
Parish (sokn)	Church name	Location of the church	Year built
Fauske	Fauske Church	Fauske	1867
Sulitjelma	Sulitjelma Church	Sulitjelma	1899
Sulitjelma	Sulitjelma Chapel	Sulitjelma	1996
Valnesfjord	Valnesfjord Church	Valnesfjord	1905

== Nature ==
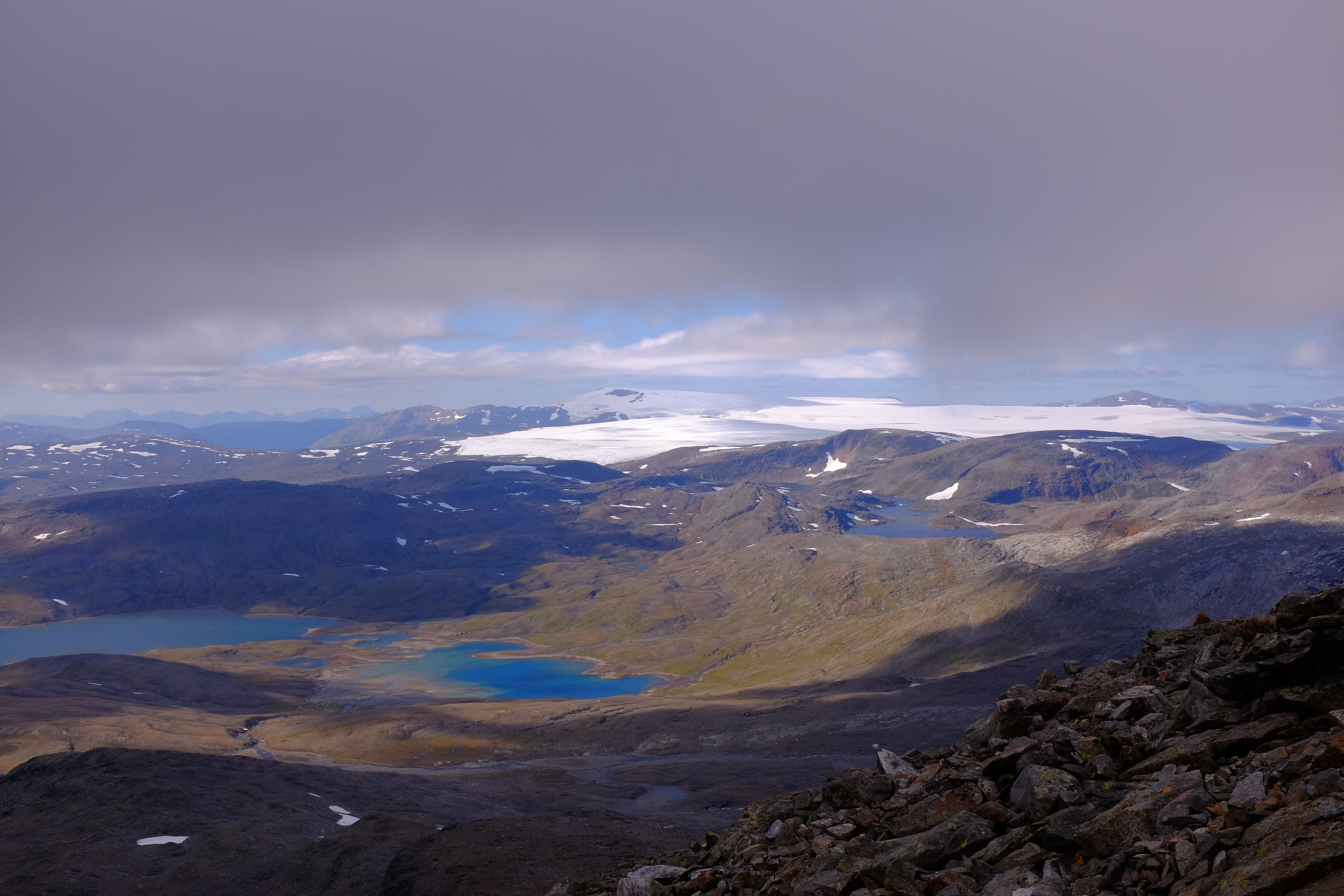
Blåmannsisen seen from the ridge up Vardetoppen in Sulitjelma

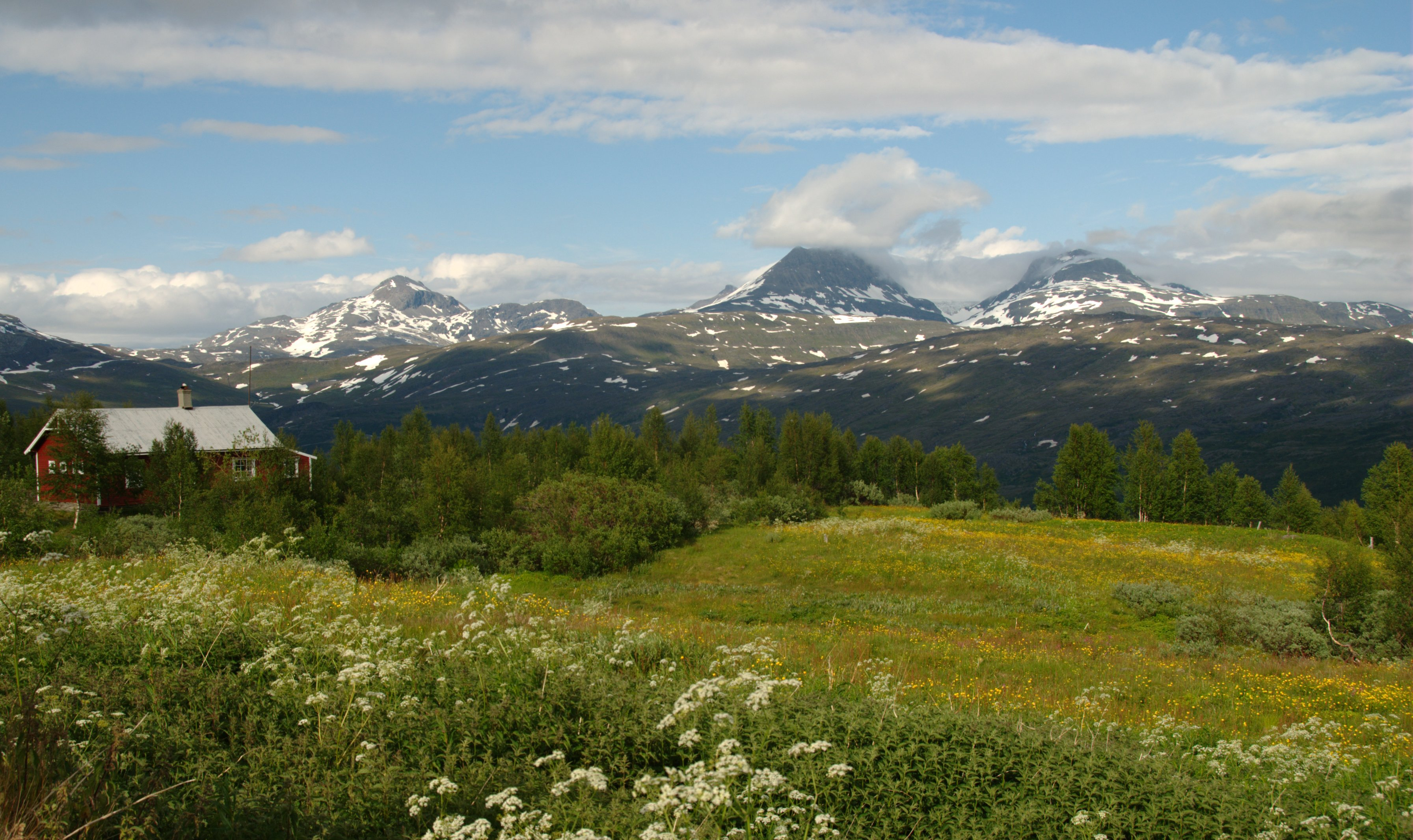
Early July and summer in the highlands at Jakobsbakken, near Sulitjelma.

There are two large glaciers in Fauske: Blåmannsisen and the Sulitjelma Glacier; covering about 14% of the municipality. The highest mountain in the municipality is Suliskongen at 1,907 metres (6,257 ft) above sea level. There are many lakes in the municipality, such as Blåmannsisvatnet, Kjelvatnet, Låmivatnet, Langvatnet, Muorkkejávrre, Nedrevatnet, Øvrevatnet, and Vuolep Sårjåsjávrre.

Junkerdal National Park and Sjunkhatten National Park are partly located in Fauske. Sulitjelma, located 44 kilometres (27 mi) by road east of Fauske, is a good starting point for hiking in the mountains and hikes to the glaciers. There are several DNT lodges in this area.

There are many nature reserves in the municipality, such as Veten nature reserve with calcareous pine forest and a rich understory and Fauskeeidet wetland area with rich bird life and observation tower.

There are several caves in the municipality. The fairly easy accessible Svarthamarhola (Svarthamar cave) is one of the largest caves in northern Europe, also hosting one of the world's most northerly bat colonies.

=== Climate ===
Fauske is located inside the Arctic Circle and has 24 hours of daylight from early May to the beginning of August, with midnight sun from the beginning of June to the second week of July. The area nearly has polar night for part of December because it has sunrise at 11 am and sunset before noon. Average 24-hour temperatures in Fauske is below freezing from mid-November to the last part of March, but the ice-free Skjerstad Fjord moderates winter temperatures. Summer starts in June with moderate summer temperatures lasting until early September.

Precipitation is heaviest from September to December (usually as snow in December); average annual precipitation is 1,040 millimetres (41 in). Daytime temperatures are usually significantly warmer than the 24-hr average from March to September, while there is very little diurnal temperature variation from November to early February as the sun is very low or below the horizon all day. However, temperatures varies considerably with the weather; there might be cool westerly winds with temperatures of 10 °C (50 °F) and rain both night and day in July, and the next day might be sunny with daytime temperature reaching 25 °C (77 °F). Southwesterly winds can bring thaws anytime in winter, but not in the mountains, which usually get large amounts of snow in winter—the main reason for the large glaciers and the hydropower in the area.

Climate data for Fauske 1991-2020 normals (20 m, Valnesfjord)
Month	Jan	Feb	Mar	Apr	May	Jun	Jul	Aug	Sep	Oct	Nov	Dec	Year
Daily mean °C (°F)	−2.6 (27.3)	−2.7 (27.1)	−1.2 (29.8)	2.6 (36.7)	7.1 (44.8)	11.1 (52.0)	14.1 (57.4)	13.2 (55.8)	9.4 (48.9)	4.2 (39.6)	0.7 (33.3)	−1.2 (29.8)	4.6 (40.2)
Average precipitation mm (inches)	131 (5.2)	103 (4.1)	124 (4.9)	71 (2.8)	79 (3.1)	91 (3.6)	91 (3.6)	84 (3.3)	134 (5.3)	143 (5.6)	118 (4.6)	160 (6.3)	1,040 (40.9)

== Government ==
Fauske Municipality is responsible for primary education (through 10th grade), outpatient health services, senior citizen services, welfare and other social services, zoning, economic development, and municipal roads and utilities. The municipality is governed by a municipal council of directly elected representatives. The mayor is indirectly elected by a vote of the municipal council. The municipality is under the jurisdiction of the Salten og Lofoten District Court and the Hålogaland Court of Appeal.

=== Municipal council ===
The municipal council (Kommunestyre) of Fauske Municipality is made up of 27 representatives that are elected to four year terms. The tables below show the current and historical composition of the council by political party.

Fauske kommunestyre 2023–2027
Party name (in Norwegian)	Number of representatives
Labour Party (Arbeiderpartiet)	7
Progress Party (Fremskrittspartiet)	4
Conservative Party (Høyre)	7
Industry and Business Party (Industri‑ og Næringspartiet)	1
Red Party (Rødt)	1
Centre Party (Senterpartiet)	4
Socialist Left Party (Sosialistisk Venstreparti)	3
Total number of members:	27

Fauske kommunestyre 2019–2023
Party name (in Norwegian)	Number of representatives
Labour Party (Arbeiderpartiet)	5
Progress Party (Fremskrittspartiet)	3
Conservative Party (Høyre)	5
Christian Democratic Party (Kristelig Folkeparti)	1
Red Party (Rødt)	2
Centre Party (Senterpartiet)	5
Socialist Left Party (Sosialistisk Venstreparti)	2
Local List (Felleslista)	4
Total number of members:	27

Fauske kommunestyre 2015–2019
Party name (in Norwegian)	Number of representatives
Labour Party (Arbeiderpartiet)	5
Progress Party (Fremskrittspartiet)	3
Conservative Party (Høyre)	3
Christian Democratic Party (Kristelig Folkeparti)	1
Red Party (Rødt)	2
Socialist Left Party (Sosialistisk Venstreparti)	1
Liberal Party (Venstre)	1
Local list (Felleslista)	11
Total number of members:	27

Fauske kommunestyre 2011–2015
Party name (in Norwegian)	Number of representatives
Labour Party (Arbeiderpartiet)	11
Progress Party (Fremskrittspartiet)	4
Conservative Party (Høyre)	6
Christian Democratic Party (Kristelig Folkeparti)	1
Red Party (Rødt)	1
Socialist Left Party (Sosialistisk Venstreparti)	1
Liberal Party (Venstre)	1
Local list (Felleslista)	5
All For The Citizens (Alt For Innbyggerne)	1
Total number of members:	31

Fauske kommunestyre 2007–2011
Party name (in Norwegian)	Number of representatives
Labour Party (Arbeiderpartiet)	9
Progress Party (Fremskrittspartiet)	6
Conservative Party (Høyre)	7
Christian Democratic Party (Kristelig Folkeparti)	1
Centre Party (Senterpartiet)	1
Socialist Left Party (Sosialistisk Venstreparti)	2
Liberal Party (Venstre)	3
Common list (Felleslista)	2
Total number of members:	31

Fauske kommunestyre 2003–2007
Party name (in Norwegian)	Number of representatives
Labour Party (Arbeiderpartiet)	12
Progress Party (Fremskrittspartiet)	7
Conservative Party (Høyre)	2
Centre Party (Senterpartiet)	1
Socialist Left Party (Sosialistisk Venstreparti)	4
Liberal Party (Venstre)	3
Common list (Felleslista)	2
Total number of members:	31

Fauske kommunestyre 1999–2003
Party name (in Norwegian)	Number of representatives
Labour Party (Arbeiderpartiet)	13
Progress Party (Fremskrittspartiet)	8
Conservative Party (Høyre)	5
Christian Democratic Party (Kristelig Folkeparti)	1
Centre Party (Senterpartiet)	1
Socialist Left Party (Sosialistisk Venstreparti)	7
Liberal Party (Venstre)	1
Common list (Felleslista)	5
Total number of members:	41

Fauske kommunestyre 1995–1999
Party name (in Norwegian)	Number of representatives
Labour Party (Arbeiderpartiet)	17
Progress Party (Fremskrittspartiet)	5
Conservative Party (Høyre)	4
Christian Democratic Party (Kristelig Folkeparti)	1
Centre Party (Senterpartiet)	3
Socialist Left Party (Sosialistisk Venstreparti)	6
Liberal Party (Venstre)	5
Total number of members:	41

Fauske kommunestyre 1991–1995
Party name (in Norwegian)	Number of representatives
Labour Party (Arbeiderpartiet)	15
Progress Party (Fremskrittspartiet)	3
Conservative Party (Høyre)	9
Christian Democratic Party (Kristelig Folkeparti)	1
Centre Party (Senterpartiet)	2
Socialist Left Party (Sosialistisk Venstreparti)	7
Liberal Party (Venstre)	4
Total number of members:	21

Fauske kommunestyre 1987–1991
Party name (in Norwegian)	Number of representatives
Labour Party (Arbeiderpartiet)	23
Progress Party (Fremskrittspartiet)	2
Conservative Party (Høyre)	8
Christian Democratic Party (Kristelig Folkeparti)	1
Centre Party (Senterpartiet)	1
Socialist Left Party (Sosialistisk Venstreparti)	4
Liberal Party (Venstre)	2
Total number of members:	41

Fauske kommunestyre 1983–1987
Party name (in Norwegian)	Number of representatives
Labour Party (Arbeiderpartiet)	27
Conservative Party (Høyre)	8
Centre Party (Senterpartiet)	1
Socialist Left Party (Sosialistisk Venstreparti)	3
Liberal Party (Venstre)	2
Total number of members:	41

Fauske kommunestyre 1979–1983
Party name (in Norwegian)	Number of representatives
Labour Party (Arbeiderpartiet)	23
Conservative Party (Høyre)	10
Christian Democratic Party (Kristelig Folkeparti)	1
Centre Party (Senterpartiet)	2
Socialist Left Party (Sosialistisk Venstreparti)	2
Liberal Party (Venstre)	3
Total number of members:	41

Fauske kommunestyre 1975–1979
Party name (in Norwegian)	Number of representatives
Labour Party (Arbeiderpartiet)	25
Conservative Party (Høyre)	5
Christian Democratic Party (Kristelig Folkeparti)	1
Centre Party (Senterpartiet)	3
Socialist Left Party (Sosialistisk Venstreparti)	4
Liberal Party (Venstre)	3
Total number of members:	41

Fauske kommunestyre 1971–1975
Party name (in Norwegian)	Number of representatives
Labour Party (Arbeiderpartiet)	27
Conservative Party (Høyre)	4
Communist Party (Kommunistiske Parti)	1
Christian Democratic Party (Kristelig Folkeparti)	1
Centre Party (Senterpartiet)	3
Socialist People's Party (Sosialistisk Folkeparti)	3
Liberal Party (Venstre)	2
Total number of members:	41

Fauske kommunestyre 1967–1971
Party name (in Norwegian)	Number of representatives
Labour Party (Arbeiderpartiet)	26
Conservative Party (Høyre)	4
Communist Party (Kommunistiske Parti)	1
Christian Democratic Party (Kristelig Folkeparti)	1
Centre Party (Senterpartiet)	2
Socialist People's Party (Sosialistisk Folkeparti)	4
Liberal Party (Venstre)	3
Total number of members:	41

Fauske kommunestyre 1963–1967
Party name (in Norwegian)	Number of representatives
Labour Party (Arbeiderpartiet)	29
Conservative Party (Høyre)	4
Communist Party (Kommunistiske Parti)	2
Christian Democratic Party (Kristelig Folkeparti)	1
Centre Party (Senterpartiet)	1
Socialist People's Party (Sosialistisk Folkeparti)	2
Liberal Party (Venstre)	2
Total number of members:	41

Fauske herredsstyre 1959–1963
Party name (in Norwegian)	Number of representatives
Labour Party (Arbeiderpartiet)	28
Conservative Party (Høyre)	3
Communist Party (Kommunistiske Parti)	5
Christian Democratic Party (Kristelig Folkeparti)	1
Centre Party (Senterpartiet)	1
Liberal Party (Venstre)	3
Total number of members:	41

Fauske herredsstyre 1955–1959
Party name (in Norwegian)	Number of representatives
Labour Party (Arbeiderpartiet)	27
Communist Party (Kommunistiske Parti)	6
Christian Democratic Party (Kristelig Folkeparti)	1
Liberal Party (Venstre)	3
Joint List(s) of Non-Socialist Parties (Borgerlige Felleslister)	4
Total number of members:	41

Fauske herredsstyre 1951–1955
Party name (in Norwegian)	Number of representatives
Labour Party (Arbeiderpartiet)	25
Communist Party (Kommunistiske Parti)	7
Christian Democratic Party (Kristelig Folkeparti)	1
Liberal Party (Venstre)	4
Joint List(s) of Non-Socialist Parties (Borgerlige Felleslister)	3
Total number of members:	40

Fauske herredsstyre 1947–1951
Party name (in Norwegian)	Number of representatives
Labour Party (Arbeiderpartiet)	24
Communist Party (Kommunistiske Parti)	9
Liberal Party (Venstre)	6
Joint List(s) of Non-Socialist Parties (Borgerlige Felleslister)	1
Total number of members:	40

Fauske herredsstyre 1945–1947
Party name (in Norwegian)	Number of representatives
Labour Party (Arbeiderpartiet)	24
Communist Party (Kommunistiske Parti)	9
Liberal Party (Venstre)	7
Total number of members:	40

Fauske herredsstyre 1937–1941*
Party name (in Norwegian)	Number of representatives
Labour Party (Arbeiderpartiet)	28
Communist Party (Kommunistiske Parti)	2
Liberal Party (Venstre)	7
Joint List(s) of Non-Socialist Parties (Borgerlige Felleslister)	3
Total number of members:	40
Note: Due to the German occupation of Norway during World War II, no elections were held for new municipal councils until after the war ended in 1945.

=== Mayors ===
The mayor (Norwegian: ordfører) of Fauske Municipality is the political leader of the municipality and the chairperson of the municipal council. Here is a list of people who have held this position:

- 1905–1910: Johan Mikal Jørgensen (V)
- 1910–1911: Johan Ebenhard Jeremiassen (V)
- 1911–1916: Hartvig Ditlev Glasø (V)
- 1917–1919: Andreas Johan Hagerup (Ap)
- 1920–1925: Hartvig Ditlev Glasø (V)
- 1925–1925: Kristian Hermann Jørgen Evjenth (LL)
- 1926–1926: Andreas Johan Hagerup (Ap)
- 1926–1941: Hans Meyer Trondsen (Ap)
- 1941–1945: Alfred Ingelaus Olsen Engan (NS)
- 1945–1945: Hans Meyer Trondsen (Ap)
- 1946–1959: Joakim Ingemann Pedersen Kosmo (Ap)
- 1960–1968: Kåre Klette (Ap)
- 1968–1983: Erling Johan Storjord (Ap)
- 1984–1991: Andreas Johan Moan (Ap)
- 1991–1999: Anne Stenhammer (SV)
- 2000–2007: Kjell Eilertsen (Ap)
- 2007–2011: Odd Henriksen (H)
- 2011–2015: Siv Anita Johnsen Brekke (Ap)
- 2015–2019: Jørn Stene (LL)
- 2019–present: Marlen Rendall Berg (Sp)

== Economy ==
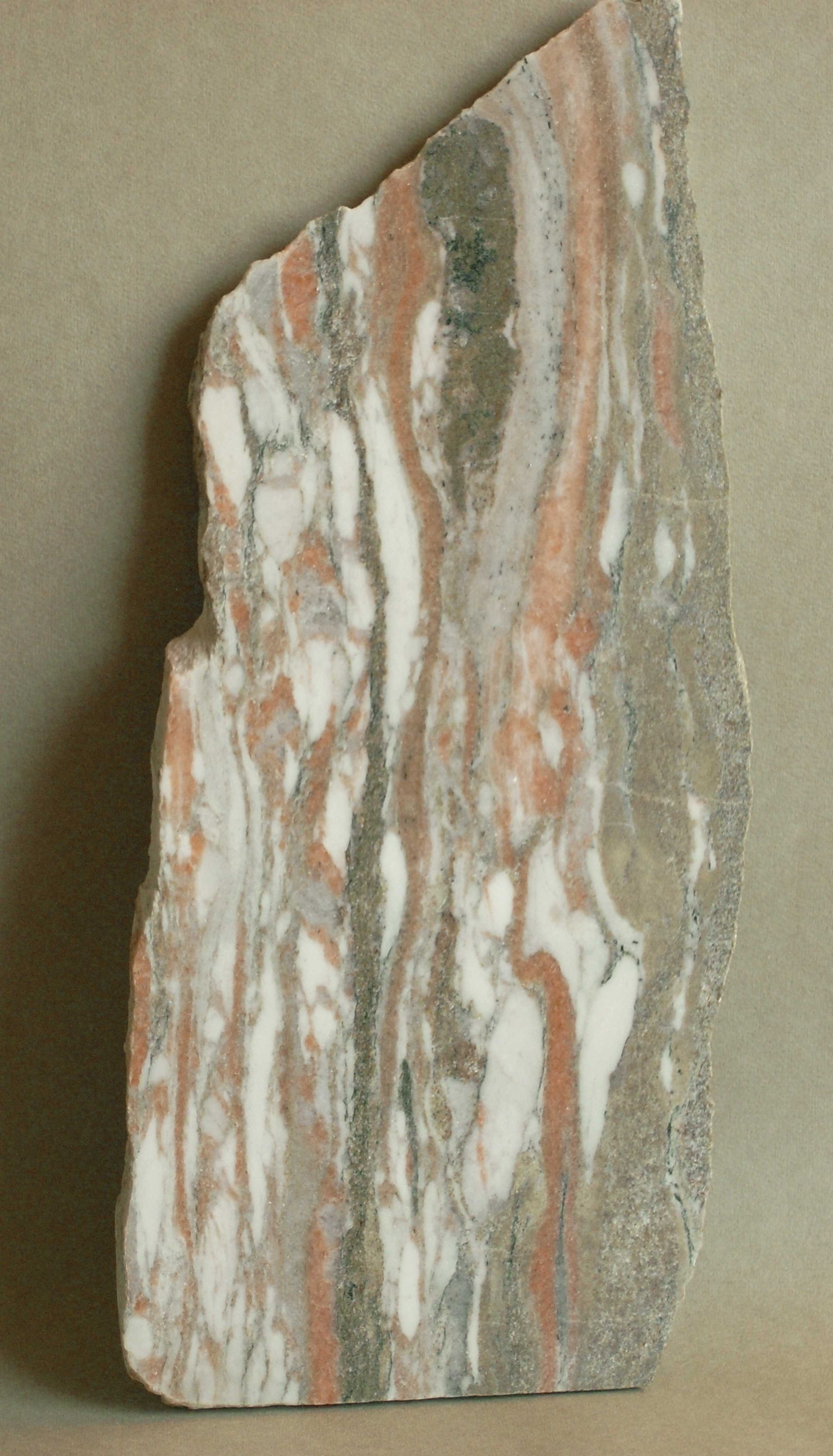
Fauske marble, known as Norwegian Rose; can also be green-white ().

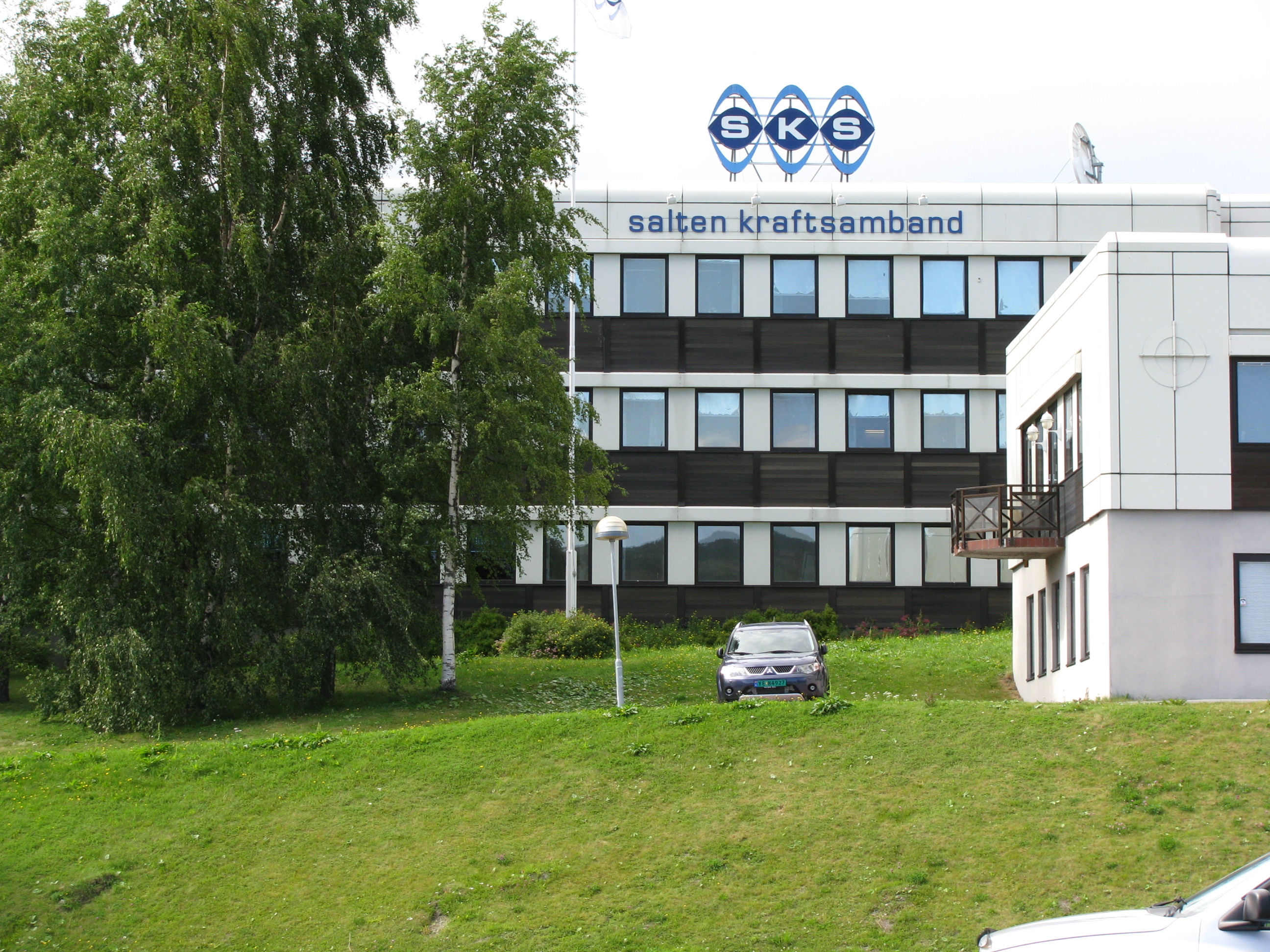
Several power companies have offices in Fauske

Manufacturing, mining and working in quarries employs 9% of the work force (as of 2021). Several marble quarries are located in the municipality. The marble is exported to many countries, where it can be observed in many monumental buildings, among them the United Nations Headquarters in New York City. There are also dolomite quarries in Fauske, as well as some agriculture. Case work for permission for renewed mining in Sulitjelma, has been going on since the early 2010s; mining there was discontinued in 1991. Historically, there was a very productive mine at Jakobsbakken.

Salten Kraftsamband and Fauske Lysverk are important employers in Fauske. The town is a commercial centre for parts of the inland areas of Salten, and has hotel and camping facilities. FK Fauske/Sprint is the local soccer team. Historically, mining in Sulitjelma was very important.

== Transportation ==
The Nordland Line passes through the municipality, reaching Bodø west of Fauske. Travellers going further north usually leave the train in Fauske, and travel by express bus to Narvik or further, using European route E6 which goes through the center of Fauske. The E6 from Mo i Rana north to Fauske crosses over the Saltfjellet mountains, and the E6 further north to Narvik also goes through very rugged terrain; these are among the most scenic drives in Norway, although there are many tunnels going through Sørfold Municipality. The Norwegian national road Rv 80 to Bodø, about 62 kilometres (39 mi) to the west, departs from E6 in the centre of Fauske.

The Norwegian County Road 830 runs from the town of Fauske to the east to the village of Sulitjelma. The road passes through several tunnels: Grønnlifjell Tunnel, Hårskolten Tunnel, Sjønståfjell Tunnel, and Stokkviknakken Tunnel. The road follows the old Sulitjelma Line railroad.

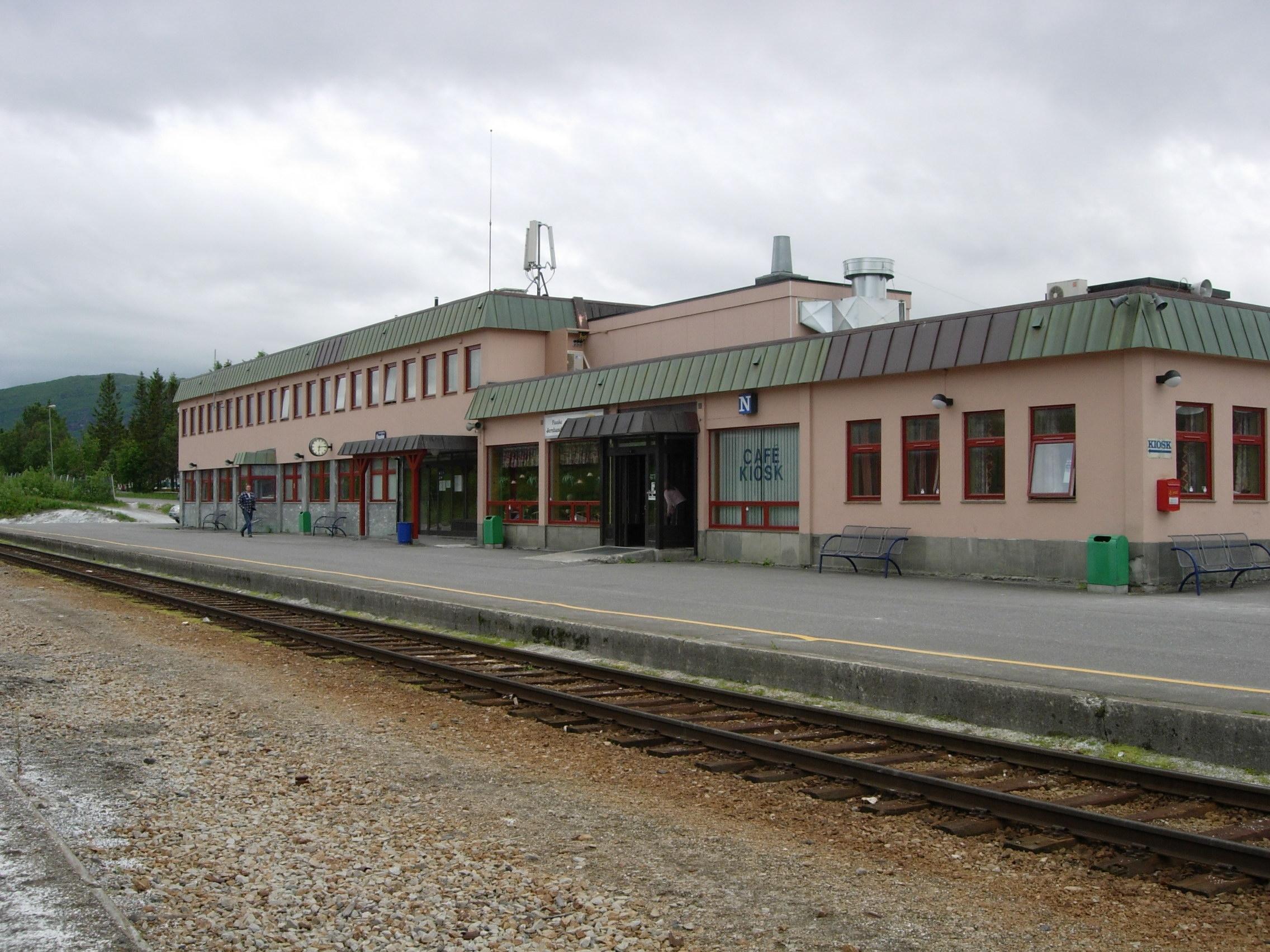
Railway station in Fauske; an important junction for many travellers. Fauske and Bodø are the most northerly stations on the main railway network in Norway.
Photo: Lars Røed Hansen

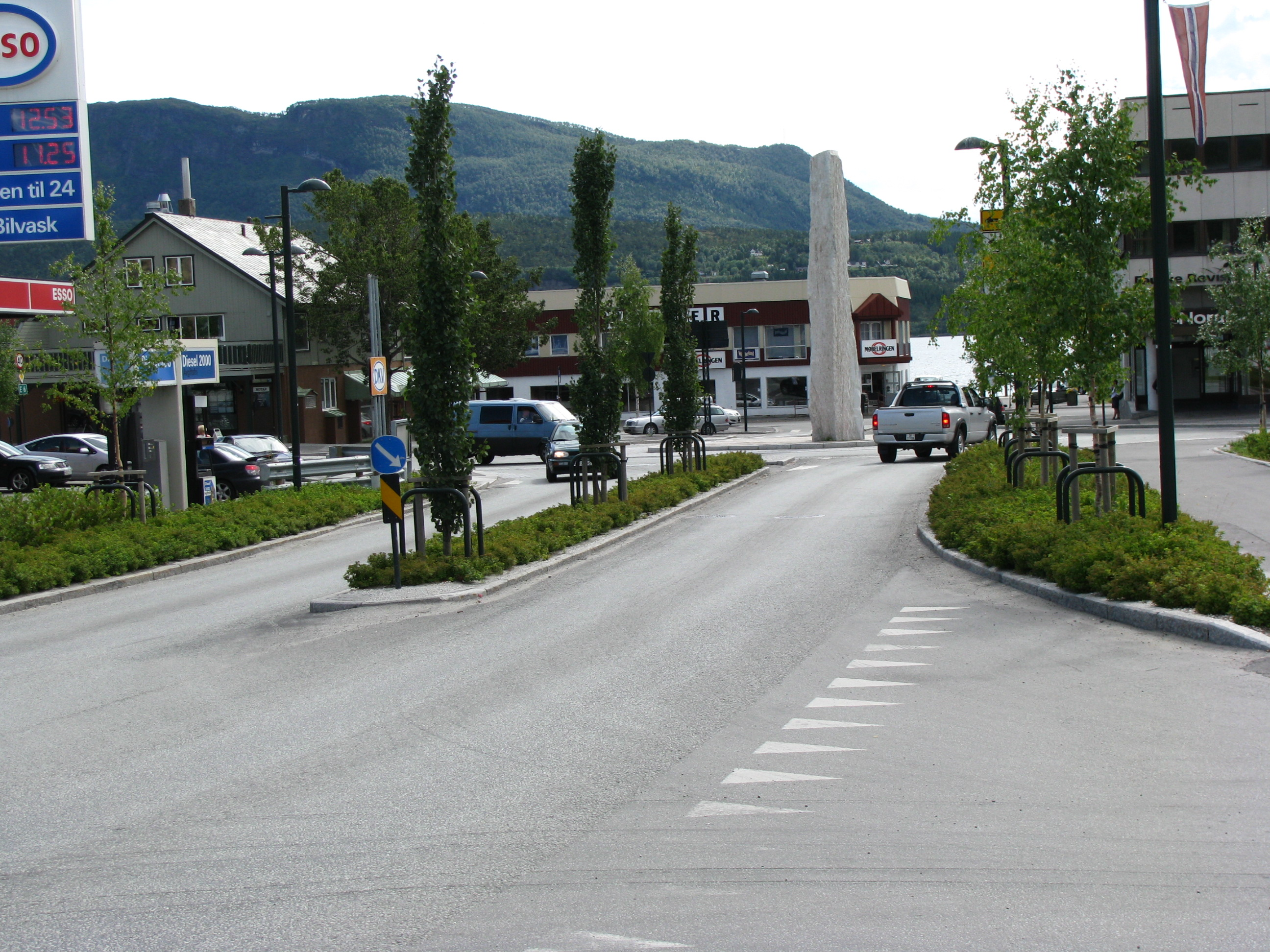
The E6 - Rv 80 road junction in the centre of Fauske

== Notable people ==
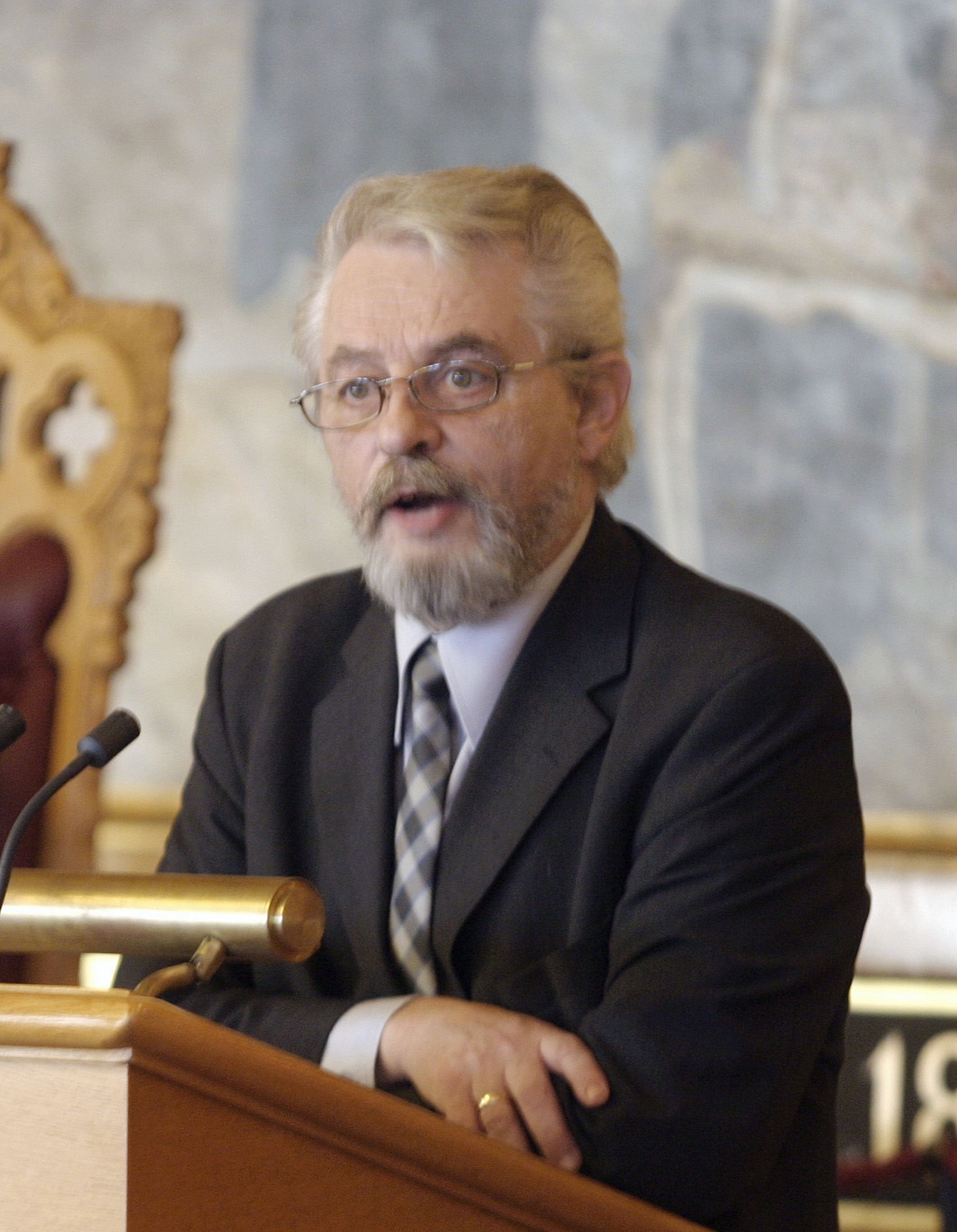
Jorgen-Kosmo, 2003

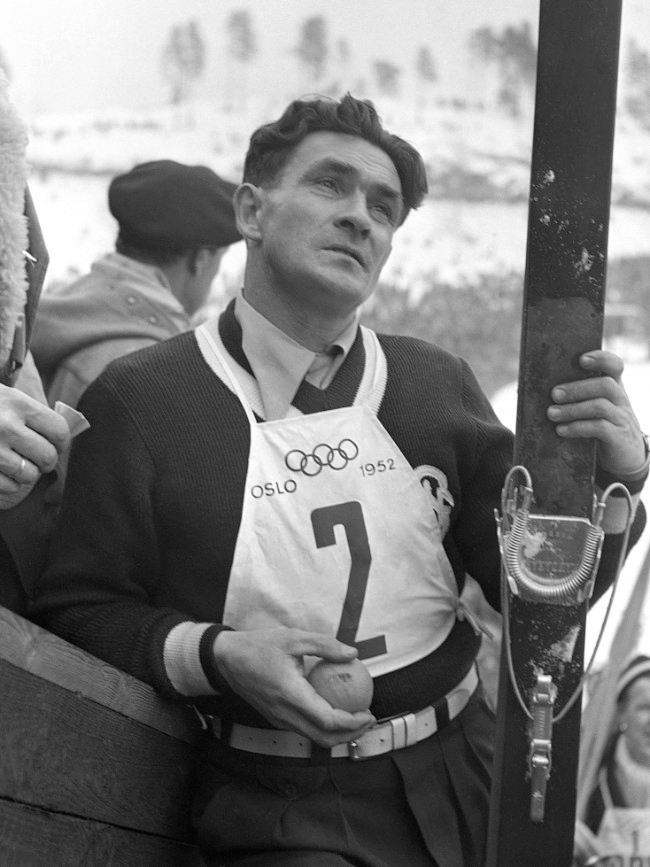
Simon Slåttvik, 1952

- Mons Andreas Petersen (1829 in Lakså – 1886), a Norwegian Sami farmer, discovered ore deposits in Sulitjelma in 1858 which became the Sulitjelma Mines
- Peter Vogelius Deinboll DSO, MC (1915 in Sulitjelma – 1944), an engineer, and Norwegian resistance member during WWII
- Jacob Jervell (1925 in Fauske – 2014), a theologian, professor emeritus, author and priest
- Eystein Husebye (born 1937 in Sulitjelma), a Norwegian seismologist and academic
- Ivar Antonsen (born 1946 in Fauske), a Norwegian jazz pianist and composer
- Jørgen Kosmo (1947 Fauske – 2017), a Norwegian politician, Auditor General of Norway 2005-2013 & President of the Storting
- Trine Angelsen (born 1965 in Fauske), a Norwegian author
- Frode Nymo (born 1975), a jazz musician, plays alto saxophone; brought up in Valnesfjord
- Atle Nymo (born 1977 in Valnesfjord), a jazz musician, plays tenor saxophone and bass clarinet
- Christel Alsos (born 1984 in Fauske), a Norwegian singer

=== Sport ===
- Simon Slåttvik (1917 in Valnesfjord – 2001), a Norwegian skier, gold medallist at the 1952 Winter Olympics
- Alexander Os (born 1980 in Fauske), a former Norwegian biathlete, competed at the 2010 Winter Olympics
- Ruben Imingen (born 1986 in Fauske), a former Norwegian footballer with 164 club caps
