= Skjerstad Fjord =

Fjord in Nordland, Norway

Skjerstad Fjord (English) Skjerstadfjorden (Norwegian)
- Interactive map of the fjord
- Location: Nordland county, Norway
- Coordinates: 67.2412°N 14.9650°E
- Type: Fjord
- Primary outflows: Saltfjorden
- Basin countries: Norway
- Max. length: 40 kilometres (25 mi)
- Settlements: Bodø, Fauske

Skjerstad Fjord (English) or Skjerstadfjorden (Norwegian) is a fjord in the municipalities of Bodø, Fauske, and Saltdal in Nordland county, Norway. It is a 40-kilometre-long (25 mi) arm off of the main Saltfjorden. It is connected to the Saltfjorden by the narrow Saltstraumen strait, which has very strong tidal currents. The villages of Valnesfjord and Rognan and the town of Fauske lie along the shores of the fjord. The European route E06 highway runs along the eastern shore of the fjord, and the Nordland Line railway follows the eastern and northern shores of the fjord. The Misværfjorden branches off this fjord to the south at the village of Skjerstad.

== See also ==
- List of Norwegian fjords
