= Salten =

- Traditional district
- The dark blue area in the map is the Salten district
- Interactive map of Salten
- Coordinates: 68.3083°N 16.0186°E
- Country: Norway
- Region: Northern Norway
- County: Nordland

Area
  - Total: 9,354 km^{2} (3,612 sq mi)

Population (2016)
  - Total: 73,375
  - Density: 7.844/km^{2} (20.32/sq mi)
- Time zone: UTC+01:00 (CET)
  - Summer (DST): UTC+02:00 (CEST)

Salten is a traditional district in Nordland county, Norway. It includes the municipalities of Gildeskål, Bodø, Beiarn, Saltdal, Fauske, Sørfold, Steigen, and Hamarøy. Salten covers an area of about 9,354 square kilometres (3,612 sq mi) and has a population (2016) of about 73,375 people.

The district borders Helgeland in the south (see Saltfjellet), Ofoten in the north, Sweden in the east, and Vestfjorden (and Lofoten) in the west. The geology in Salten is known in Norway for having the country's largest areas with marble. There are many fjords, and mountains often reaching to the sea. The town of Bodø is the main population center of the district, while the town of Fauske is a secondary center.

== Media gallery ==
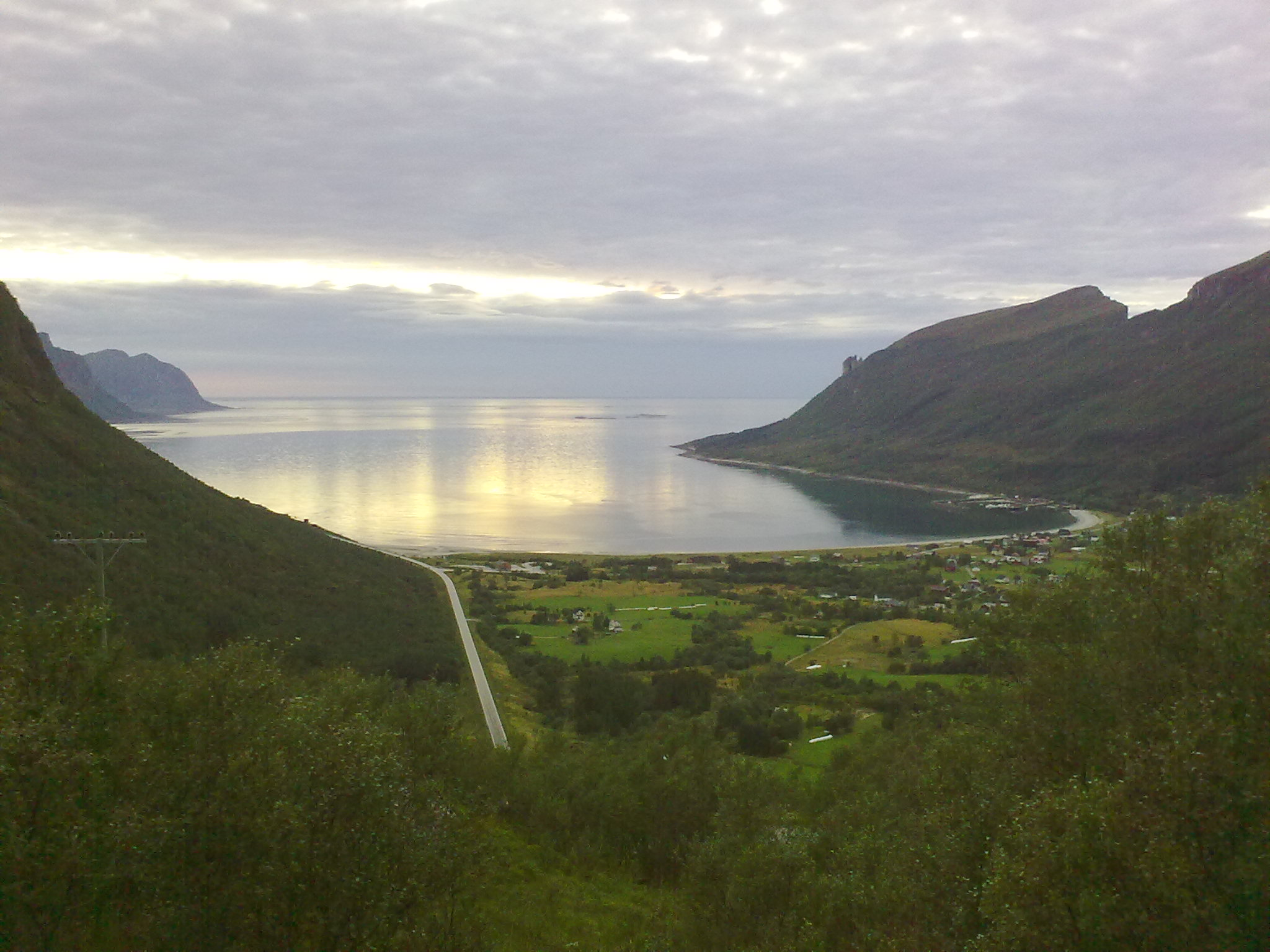
Storvika (bay) in Gildeskål

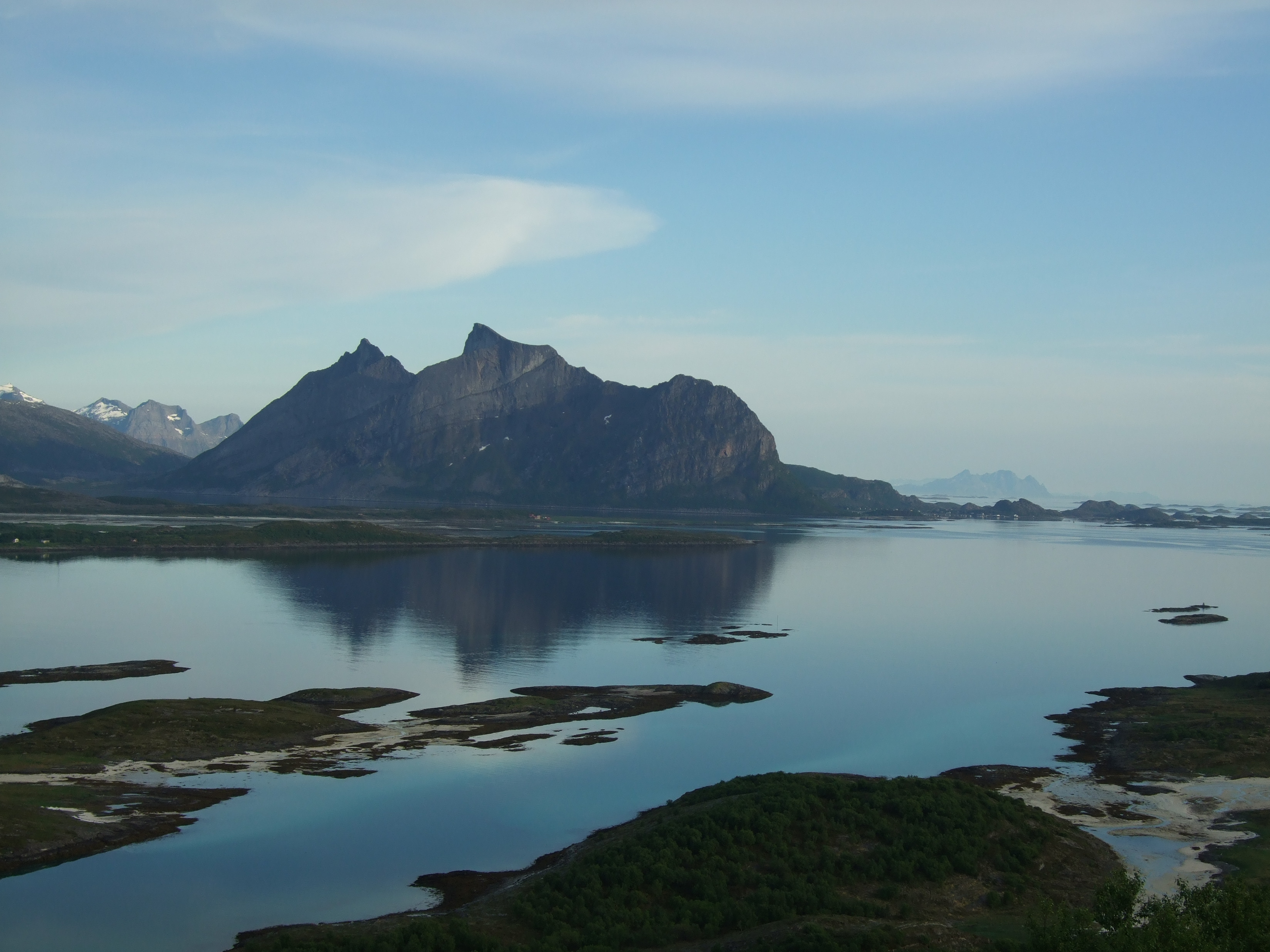
Skotstindan in Steigen

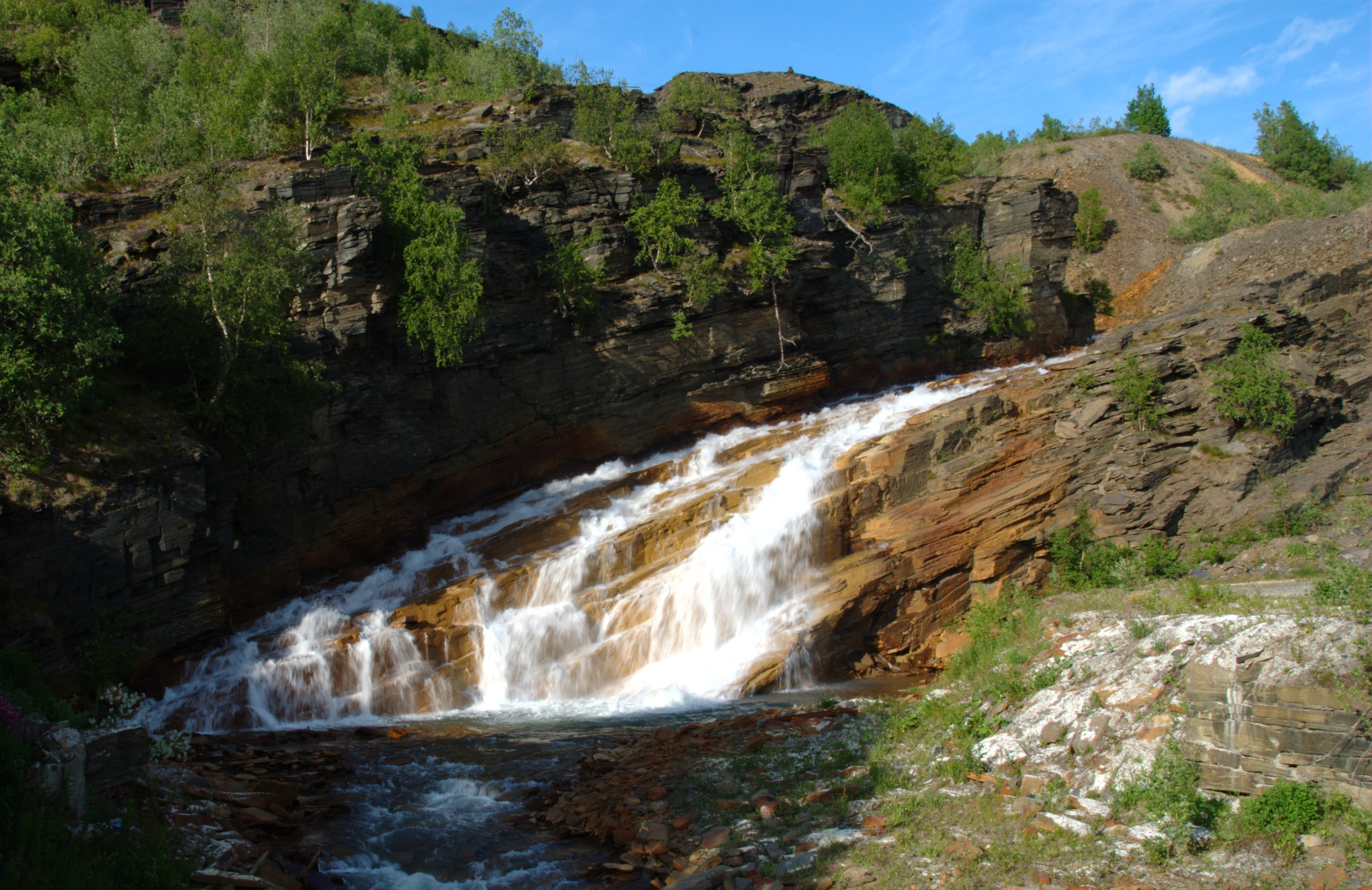
Rupsi river, Fauske

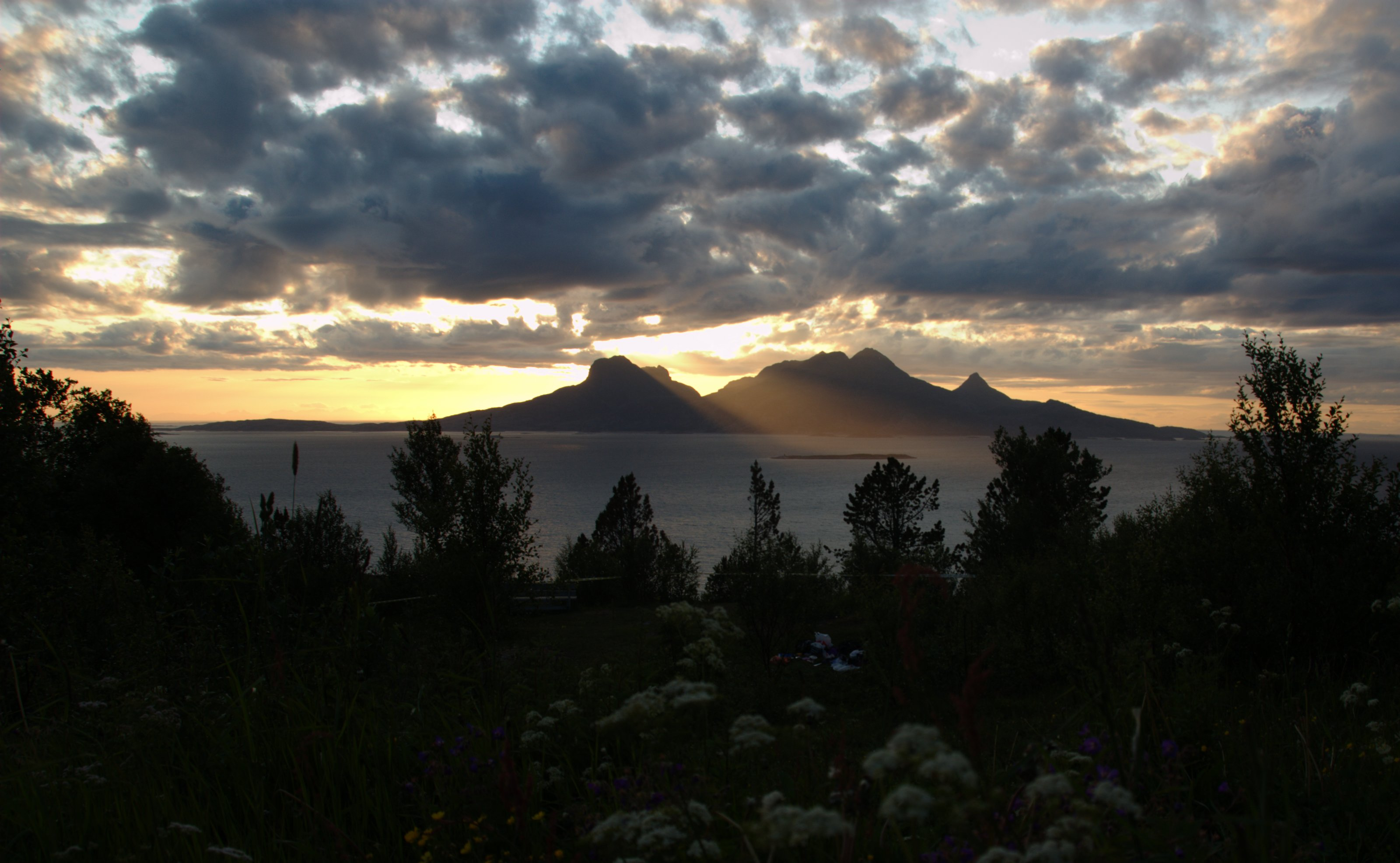
Landegode island illuminated by the midnight sun in Bodø

== Dialect ==
The dialect of Salten is well known for its large use of apocope. For instance, a local would say "æ tænkt å kjøp ei flask fløt og en pos me pære vess æ rækk butikkan" while in the formal Norwegian language one would say "jeg tenkte å kjøpe en flaske fløte og en pose med pærer om jeg rekker butikkene". The words in this list (tenkte, kjøpe, flaske, fløte, pose, pærer) are pronounced with two syllables in formal Norwegian, but with just one in some Salten dialects.

== Name ==
The district is named after the Saltfjorden (Old Norse: Salpti), and the fjord is probably named after the famous Saltstraumen. Even though the word salt has the same meaning in the modern Norwegian language as in the English language, these names most likely have nothing to do with salt, but are derived from an old (obsolete) word salpt with the meaning "strong stream".

Three other fjords in Norway with narrow entrances (and thus strong tidal streams) also have names including -salten: Busalten in Namsos Municipality, and Nordsalten and Sørsalten in Nærøysund Municipality.
