= Fauske (town) =

Town in Fauske Municipality, Nordland county, Norway

Fauske: Fauske (Norwegian); Fuossko (Lule Sami)
- Town/City
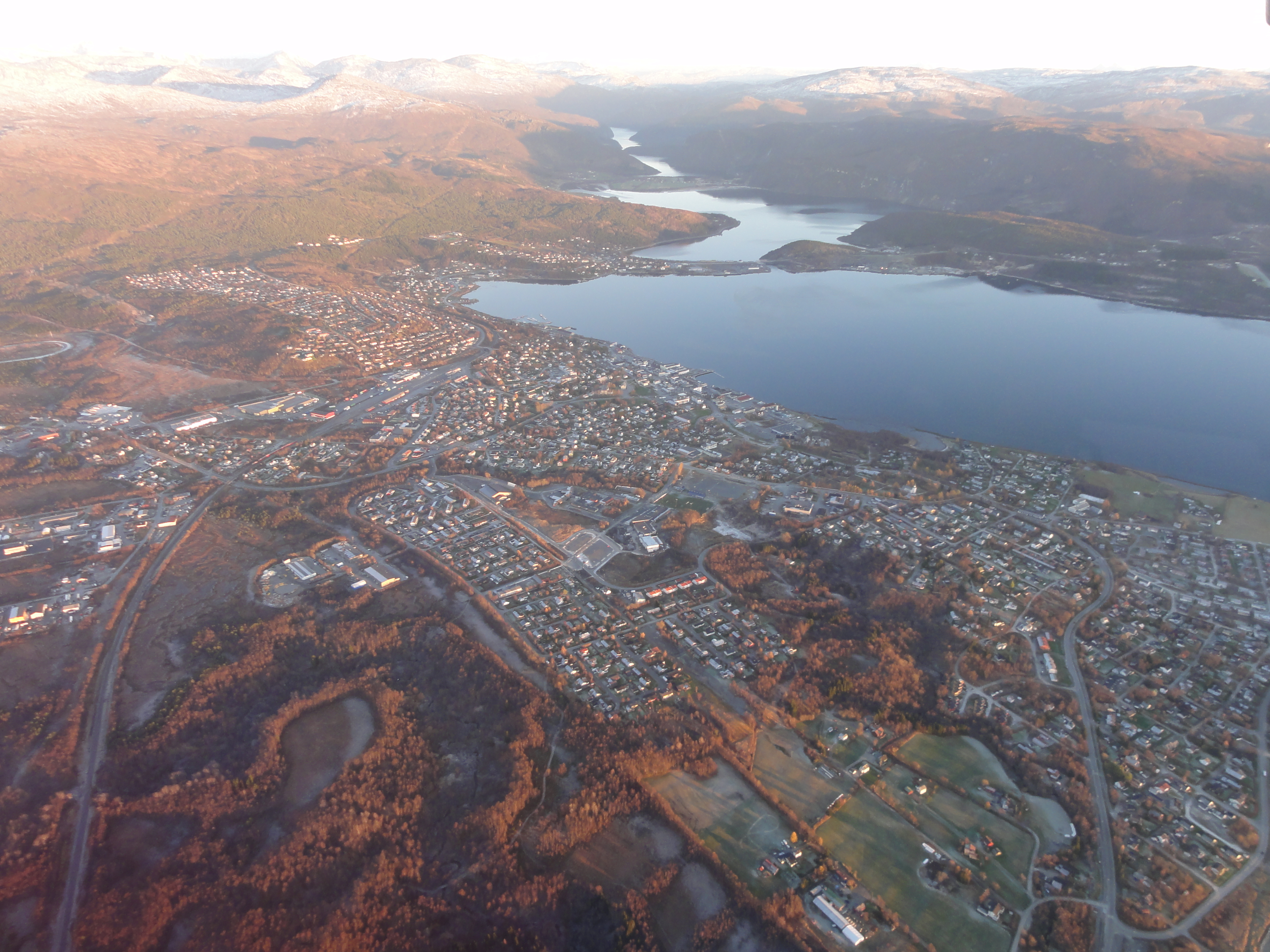
- View of the town
- Interactive map of Fauske
- Location within Nordland Location within Norway
- Coordinates: 67.2594°N 15.3933°E
- Region: Northern Norway
- County: Nordland
- District: Salten
- Municipality: Fauske Municipality
- Established as
- Town (By): 1998

Area
  - Total: 4.64 km^{2} (1.79 sq mi)
- Elevation: 9 m (30 ft)

Population (2023)
  - Total: 6,252
  - Density: 1,347/km^{2} (3,490/sq mi)
- Demonym(s): Fauskværing; Fauskeværing
- Time zone: UTC+01:00 (CET)
  - Summer (DST): UTC+02:00 (CEST)
- Post Code: 8200 Fauske

Fauske (Norwegian) or Fuossko (Lule Sami) is a town in Fauske Municipality in Nordland county, Norway. It is also the administrative centre of Fauske Municipality. The town is located on the shore of the Skjerstad Fjord, about 60 kilometres (37 mi) east of the town of Bodø and about 40 kilometres (25 mi) west of the border with Sweden. The lake Nervatnet lies on the southeast side of the town.

The 4.64-square-kilometre (1,150-acre) town has a population (2023) of 6,252 and a population density of 1,347 inhabitants per square kilometre (3,490/sq mi).

Fauske was established as a town in 1998 when the municipal council of Fauske Municipality designated it as such. It is the site of the local municipal government. Fauske Church and the Fauske Upper Secondary School are both located in the town as well. A historic area in the town is also part of the Nordland Museum. here are various types of industry in Fauske, especially industries related to the local mining of marble.

== Name ==
The town (originally the municipality and historic Church of Norway parish) is named after the old Fauske farm (Old Norse: Fauskar) since the first Fauske Church was built there in 1867. The name is the plural form of fauskr which means "old and rotten tree".

== Transportation ==
The town is a centre of transportation for the region. The junction of the European route E06 and Norwegian National Road 80 highways is located in the town. The Nordlandsbanen railway line also runs through the town, stopping at Fauske Station. Norwegian County Road 830 begins at Fauske and heads southwest to the Sulitjelma area. The nearest airport is Bodø Airport, which is located 53.4 km (33 mi) west of the town.

== Climate ==
Fauske is located inside the Arctic Circle and it has 24 hours of daylight from early May to the beginning of August, with midnight sun from the beginning of June to the second week of July. The town nearly experiences polar night in December because it has sunrise at 11 am and sunset before noon. Average 24-hour temperatures in Fauske are below freezing from mid-November to the last part of March, but the ice-free Skjerstad Fjord moderates winter temperatures. Summer starts in June with moderate summer temperatures lasting until early September.

Precipitation is heaviest from September to December (usually as snow in December); average annual precipitation is 1,040 millimetres (41 in). Daytime temperatures are usually significantly warmer than the 24-hr average from March to September, while there is very little diurnal temperature variation from November to early February as the sun is very low or below the horizon all day. However, temperatures vary considerably with the weather; there might be cool westerly winds with temperatures of 10 °C (50 °F) and rain both night and day in July, and the next day might be sunny with daytime temperature reaching 25 °C (77 °F). Southwesterly winds can bring thaws anytime in winter, but not in the mountains, which usually get large amounts of snow in winter—the main reason for the large glaciers and the hydropower in the area.

Climate data for Fauske
Month	Jan	Feb	Mar	Apr	May	Jun	Jul	Aug	Sep	Oct	Nov	Dec	Year
Daily mean °C (°F)	−4.2 (24.4)	−3.6 (25.5)	−1.7 (28.9)	2.1 (35.8)	7.4 (45.3)	11.2 (52.2)	13.0 (55.4)	12.5 (54.5)	8.5 (47.3)	4.4 (39.9)	−0.5 (31.1)	−3.0 (26.6)	3.8 (38.8)
Average precipitation mm (inches)	98 (3.9)	81 (3.2)	75 (3.0)	53 (2.1)	45 (1.8)	53 (2.1)	78 (3.1)	79 (3.1)	110 (4.3)	147 (5.8)	105 (4.1)	116 (4.6)	1,040 (40.9)
Source: Met.no

== Media gallery ==
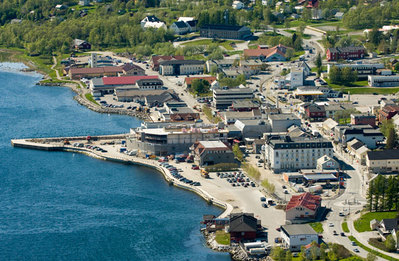

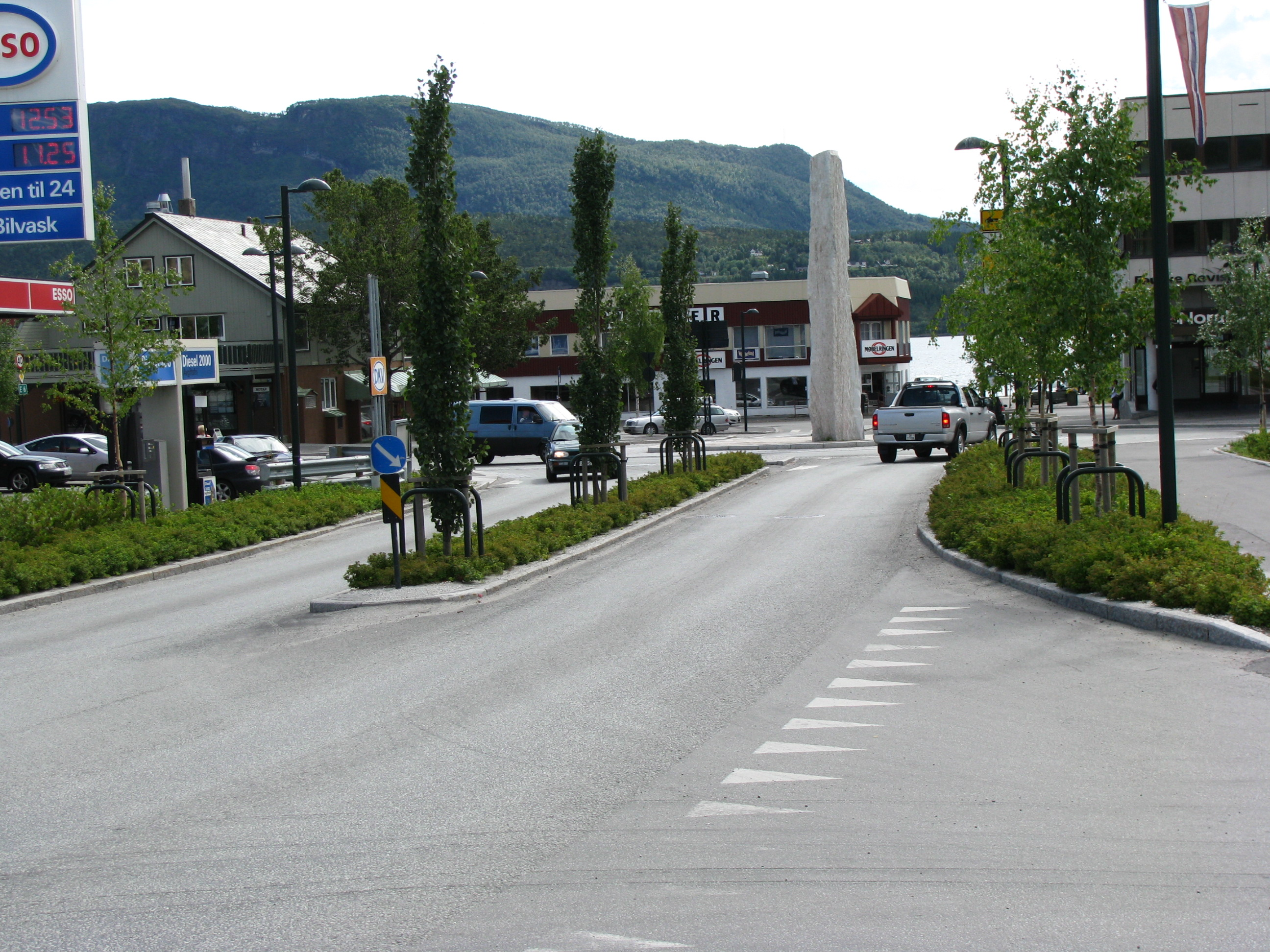

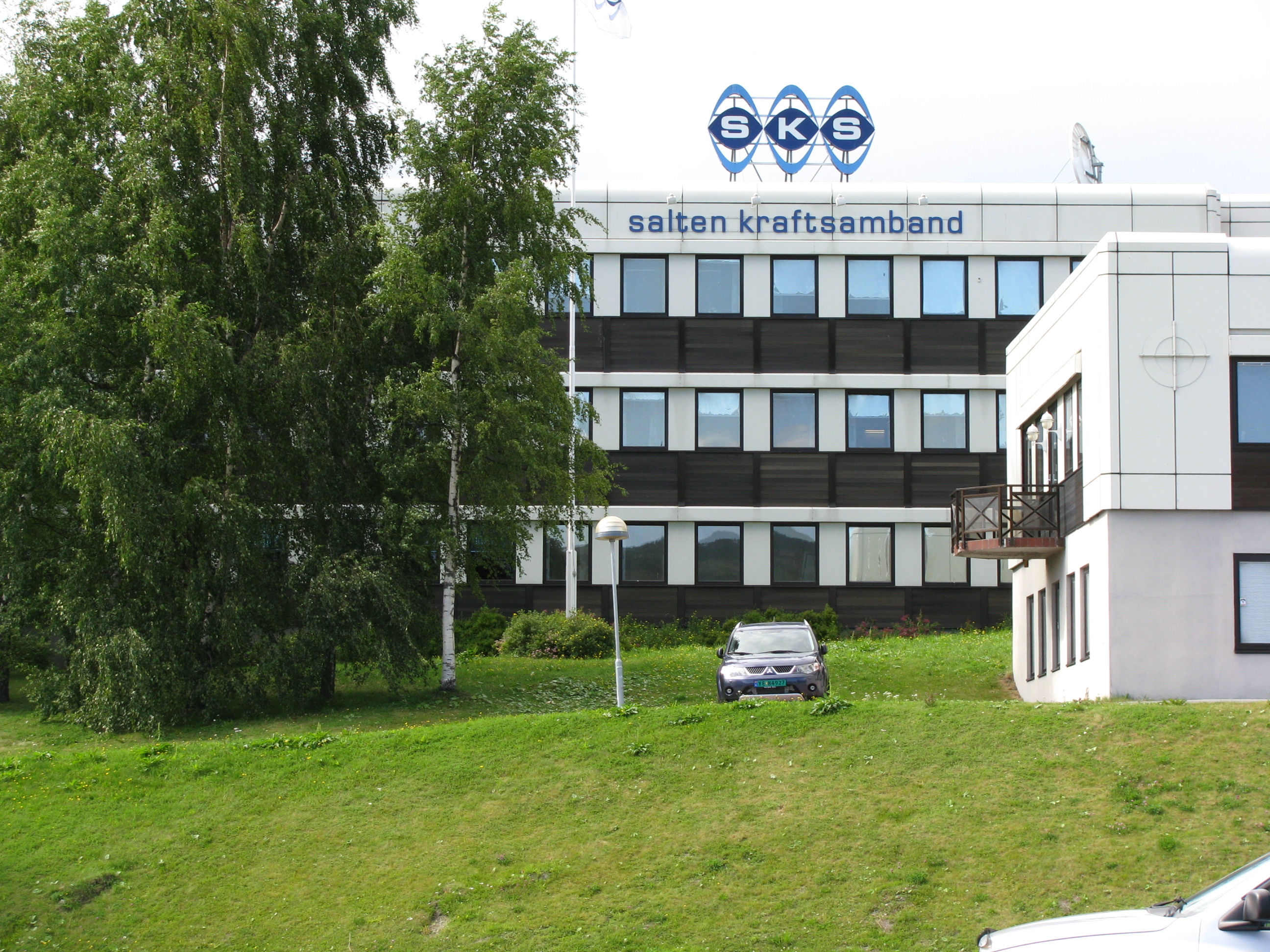

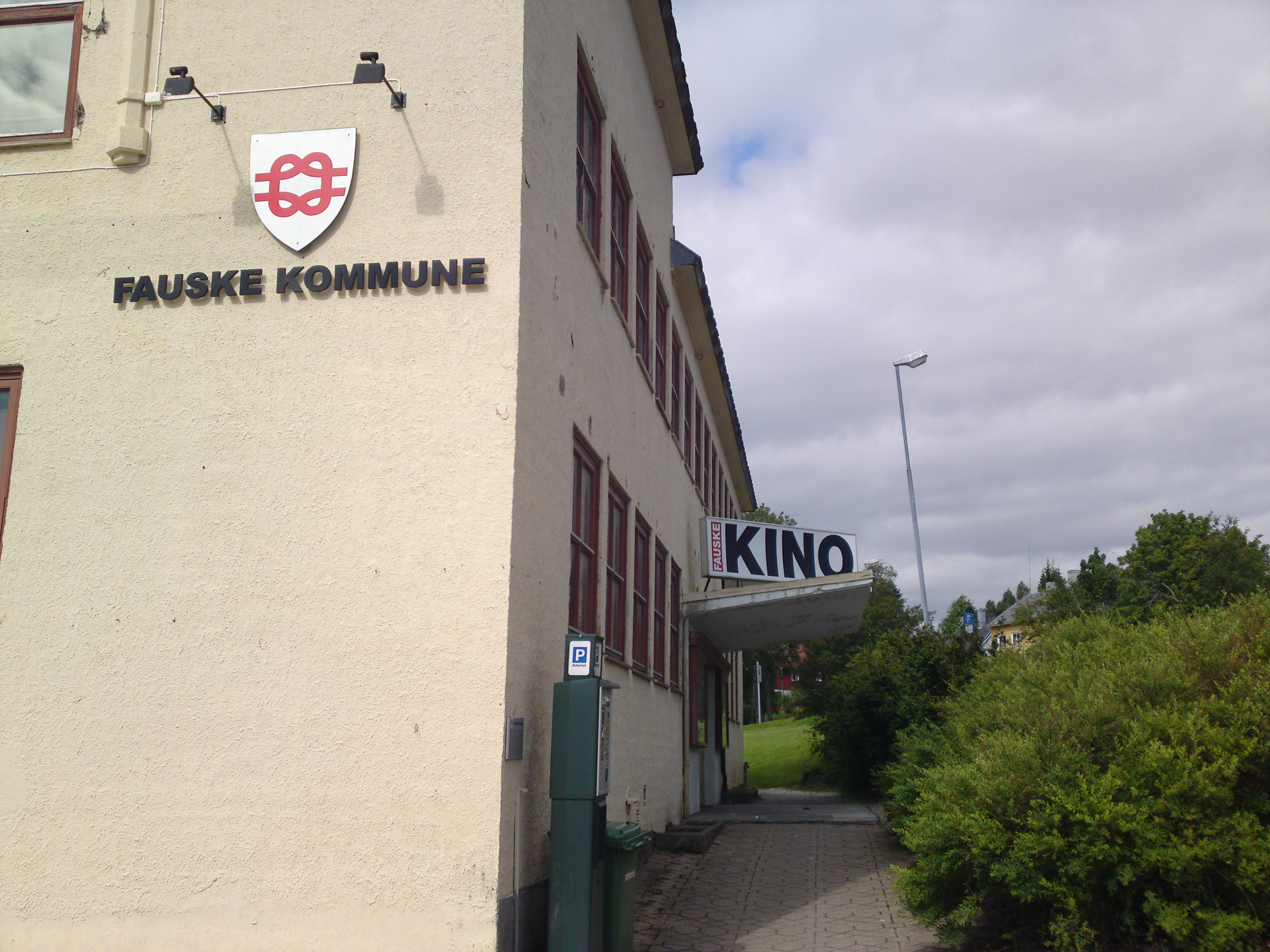

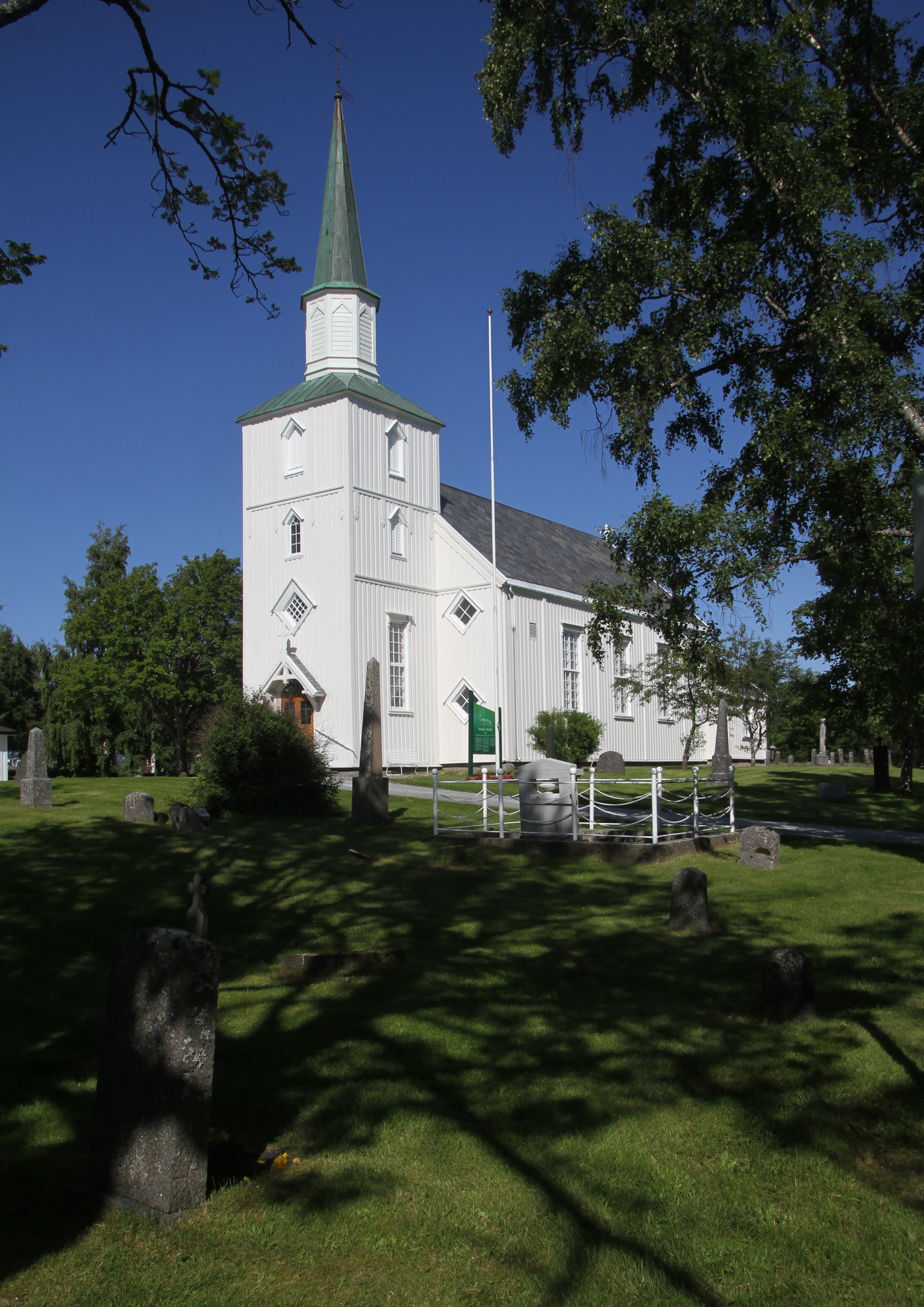

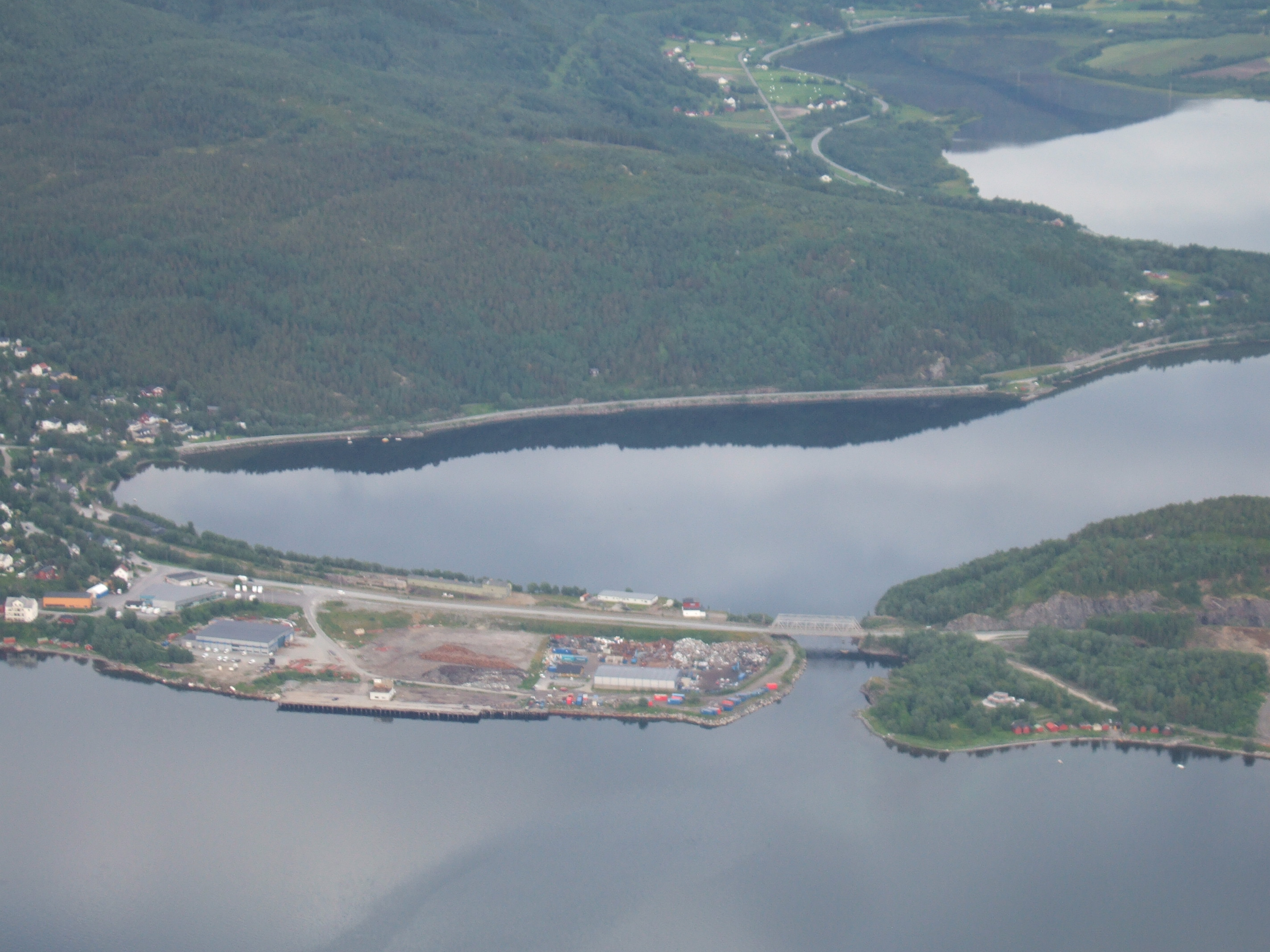

== Twin town ==
- Gödöllő, Hungary (2022)

== See also ==
- List of towns and cities in Norway
