= Sulitjelma (disambiguation) =

Sulitjelma may refer to:

== Places ==
- Sulitjelma, a village in Fauske municipality in Nordland county, Norway
- Sulitjelma (mountain), a mountain massif in Fauske municipality in Nordland county, Norway
- Sulitjelma Glacier, a glacier in Norway and Sweden
- Sulitjelma Chapel, a chapel in Fauske municipality in Nordland county, Norway
- Sulitjelma Church, a church in Fauske municipality in Nordland county, Norway
- Sulitjelma Hotel, a hotel in Fauske municipality in Nordland county, Norway

== Other ==
- Sulitjelma Mines, a defunct mining company based in Fauske municipality in Nordland county, Norway
- Sulitjelma Line, a former railway line in Fauske municipality in Nordland county, Norway
