= Sulitjelma (mountain) =

Massif along the Norway-Sweden border

- Sulitelma, Sulidälbmá/Sulidælbmá
- Aerial view of Sulitjelma

Highest point
- Elevation: 1,908 m (6,260 ft)
- Coordinates: 67°08′49″N 16°22′39″E

Geography
- Interactive map of the mountain
- Location: Fauske, Nordland, Norway; Arjeplog, Norrbotten, Sweden

Sulitjelma (Swedish: Sulitelma, Pite Sami: Sulidälbmá or Sulidælbmá) is a mountain massif on the Norway-Sweden border in Fauske Municipality in Nordland county, Norway and Arjeplog Municipality in Norrbotten County, Sweden. The massif lies east of the village of Sulitjelma, which takes its name from the mountain. The massif is bordered by Låmivatnet (Lake Låmi) and Muorkkejávrre (Lake Muorkke) to the south, and by Bajep Sårjåsjávrre (Upper Lake Sårjås) and Vuolep Sårjåsjávrre (Lower Lake Sårjås) to the north. About two-thirds of the mountain is in Norway. The Langvann Valley extends toward the massif along a northwest–southeast axis, through which the Sjønstå River (Norwegian: Sjønståelva, known as the Langvasselva in its upper course) flows, forming the Sulitjelma watercourse. The valley starts at the village of Sjønstå on Øvervatnet (Upper Lake), which lies about 17 kilometers (11 mi) east of the village of Sulitjelma itself.

The name Sulitjelma is derived from the original Sami name for the mountainous area. Sami place names describe the terrain, but the meaning of Sulitjelma is unknown. Over time, various suggestions have been proposed for its meaning, such as 'eye of the Sun', 'twilight threshold', 'divine gate', 'the eye's threshold', and 'festival mountain'.

== Peaks and surrounding area ==
=== Peaks ===
Many parts of the Sulitjelma massif are covered by the Sulitjelma Glacier and Stuorrajekna (or Stuorrajiegŋa, both Sami names meaning 'big glacier'). In the middle of the massif, on the Norwegian side of the border, the mountain Suliskongen stands above the glacier. It is the highest peak on the Sulitjelma massif, with an elevation of 1,908 meters (6,260 ft). The second-highest peak on the massif stands on the Swedish side of the border and is called Svenska Stortoppen ("Swedish big peak"). It is not marked by name or elevation on modern maps, but older sources indicate that it has an elevation of 1,869 meters (6,132 ft). Other prominent peaks are Norway's Stortoppen (1,822 meters or 5,978 feet) to the west, Vágŋatjåhkkå (1,690 meters or 5,540 feet) to the south, and Sårjåstjåhkkå (1,690 meters or 5,540 feet) on the northern edge of the massif.

Border cairn (Norwegian: riksrøys) no. 239A marks the border between Norway and Sweden and stands on the ridge between Suliskongen and Svenska Stortoppen, at an elevation of 1,669 meters (5,476 ft).

=== The first explorers ===
The Langvann Valley is a fertile valley that cuts into the massif. However, the natural conditions of the valley make it difficult to access, and in earlier times few people other than Sami were familiar with this mountainous region. Aside from the Sami, the first people to explore the area were probably members of the boundary commission. In 1762, the commission was in the area and described the Sulitjelma massif as unable to be climbed.

=== The first settlement and tourists ===
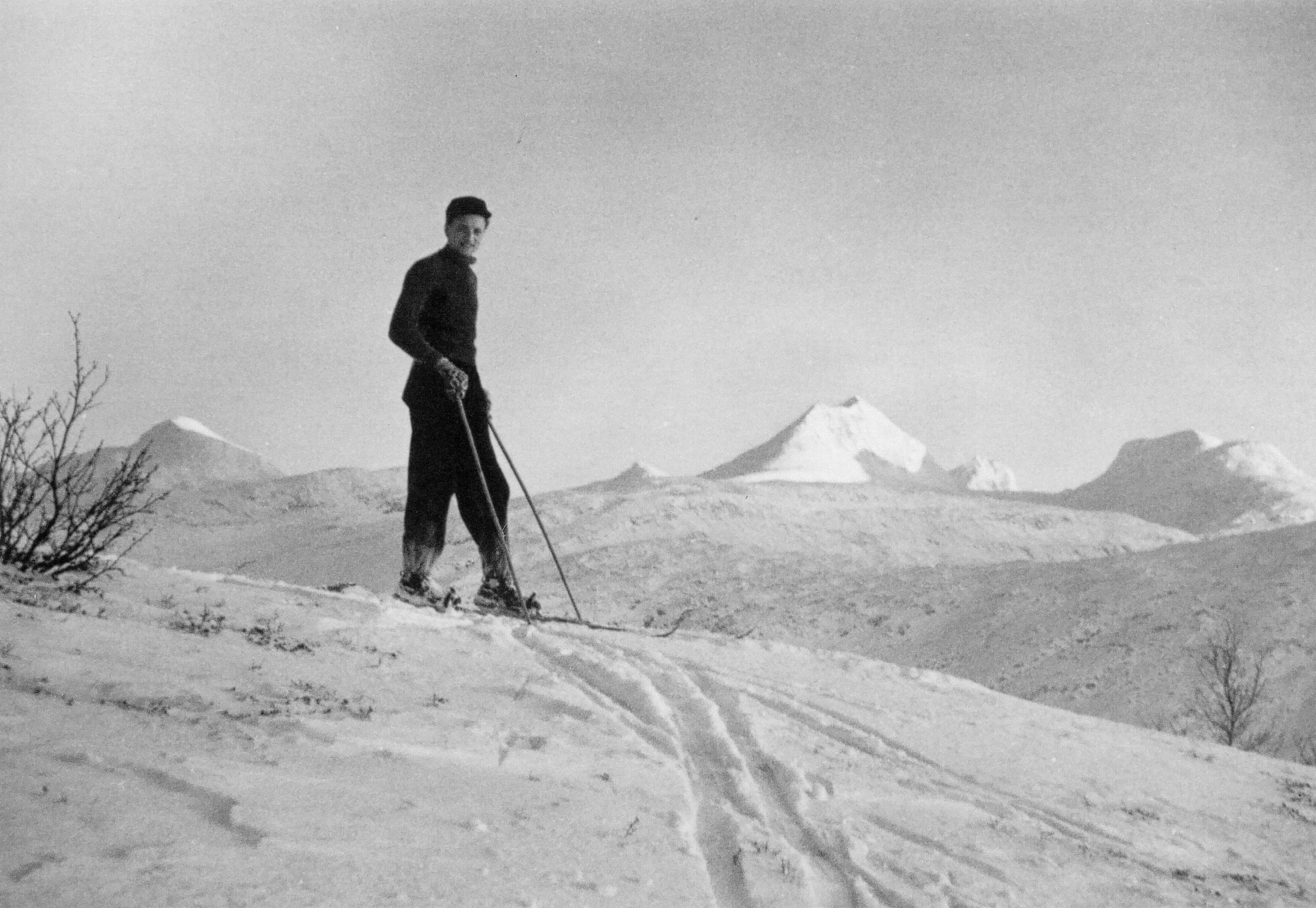
A boy skiing in Drejerbakken near the Sagmo Mine in December 1953

It is believed that the first settler to cultivate the land at Langvatnet (Long Lake) was Anders Larsen from the Svartvassheia farm in Nord-Rana Municipality. He and his family had first settled for some years in at the Skaiti farm in Saltdal Municipality before moving north over the mountains to Sulitjelma in 1848. They initially settled below a cliff at Sandnes on Langvatnet and had some livestock there. In the course of a few years, as many as six newly cleared farms were set up along Langvatnet. The people made a living from livestock, forestry, hunting, and fishing. Firewood was floated down the Sjønstå River and transported further by rowboat to traders at Skjerstad Fjord, which provided income to the settlers. In 1875 about 50 people lived in Sulitjelma, and around that time mountain tourists started coming not only from Norway but also Sweden, England, Germany, the Netherlands, France, and the United States.

The court clerk and crown prosecutor Oscar Aanderud, who moved to Bodø in 1883, was one of the first Norwegians to frequently go hiking in Sulitjelma. His excursions took him to the recently cleared Fagerli farm, owned by Søren Larsen. For a time, this farm was a gathering point for hikers in Sulitjelma. Larsen had two sons that became popular mountain guides for tourists in the Sulitjelma mountains. The most popular peak was Vardetoppen (1,715 meters or 5,627 feet). The Bodø Area Hiking Association made its own arrangements with the Fagerli farm on fixed rates for tours. Among other things, the rate in 1899 for a tour from Sulitjelma to Kvikkjokk in Sweden, a trip of over 90 kilometers (56 mi), was 30 kroner. This also included transporting luggage weighing up to 15 kilograms (33 lb). The engineer Alfred Hasselbom at Sulitjelma Mines arranged for translations of descriptions of the area's mountain routes into English, German, French, and Spanish.

Due to mining by Sulitjelma Mines, many people moved to the town of Sulitjelma and they eventually developed a strong interest in pursuing outdoor activities in mountainous areas. Along with the opening of the Sulitjelma Line to serve the mines, communication in the area was significantly improved for visitors. The Sulitjelma Area Hiking Association was founded in 1937 and set up many lodges in the area.

== Göran Wahlenberg's survey ==
In the summer of 1807, Göran Wahlenberg, a Swedish naturalist and a professor at Uppsala University, carried out observations and surveys in Salten and on the Sulitjelma massif. Wahlenberg published his report in 1808, making the Sulitjelma massif the best-described mountainous area in Scandinavia. Carl Linnaeus's journey to Salten more or less followed Wahlenberg's earlier route, via Kvikkjokk to Virihaure and then to the north of today's Rago National Park and down to Leir Fjord in Sørfold Municipality. From the Sami, Wahlberg had heard that the easiest way to Sulitjelma passed through Vatenbygda above the lakes Nedrevatnet (Lower Lake) and Øvrevatnet (Upper Lake), and further through the narrow Langvann Valley to its end at Mount Ráhpes (Pite Sami: Ráhpesvarre), also known as Rupsi (934 meters or 3,064 feet).

Several mountains in the Sulitjelma massif were measured by Wahlberg in the summer of 1807. Using a mercury barometer, he determined the elevation of Vágŋatjåhkkå, and from that he trigonometrically calculated the elevations of Suliskongen, Vardetoppen, and Stortoppen. These measurements made with simple instruments correspond closely to modern measurements.

A later researcher of the Sulitjelma massif was the German-Argentine botanist Paul Günther Lorentz (1835–1881). He traveled to Sulitjelma in August 1868, and he gave detailed descriptions of its botany, as well as the natural environment in general, the Sami, and how the people on the newly cleared farms in the Langvann Valley made a living. Lorentz was also interested in geology, but he probably did not discover any ore deposits during his short journey.
