= Fossen (Fauske) =

- Location within Nordland Location within Norway
- Location: Nordland county, Norway
- Coordinates: 67°10′27″N 15°49′38″E
- Elevation: 139
- Watercourse: Sjønstå River

Fossen (lit. 'the waterfall') is a waterfall along the Sjønstå River in Fauske Municipality in Nordland county, Norway. It is about 9 kilometers (5.6 mi) upriver from the Sjønstå farm.

In 1892, the Sulitjelma Line was built between Sjønstå and Fossen, replacing an unimproved road from 1888. Ore from Sulitjelma Mines was transported by boat across the lake Langvatnet (Long Lake) from Sulitjelma to Fossen, and then by rail from Fossen to Sjønstå to be taken by boat via the lake Øvervatnet (Upper Lake) and Nervatnet (Lower Lake), so that it could be sent by ship from Finneid along Skjerstad Fjord. The line was extended from Fossen to Hellarmo a year later.

The Sulitjelma Line was discontinued on July 23, 1972 and the station at Fossen is no longer used.

== See also ==
- List of waterfalls
