= Lakså, Fauske =

Lakså, Fauske: Lakså (Norwegian); Láksoavvo (Lule Sami)
- Village
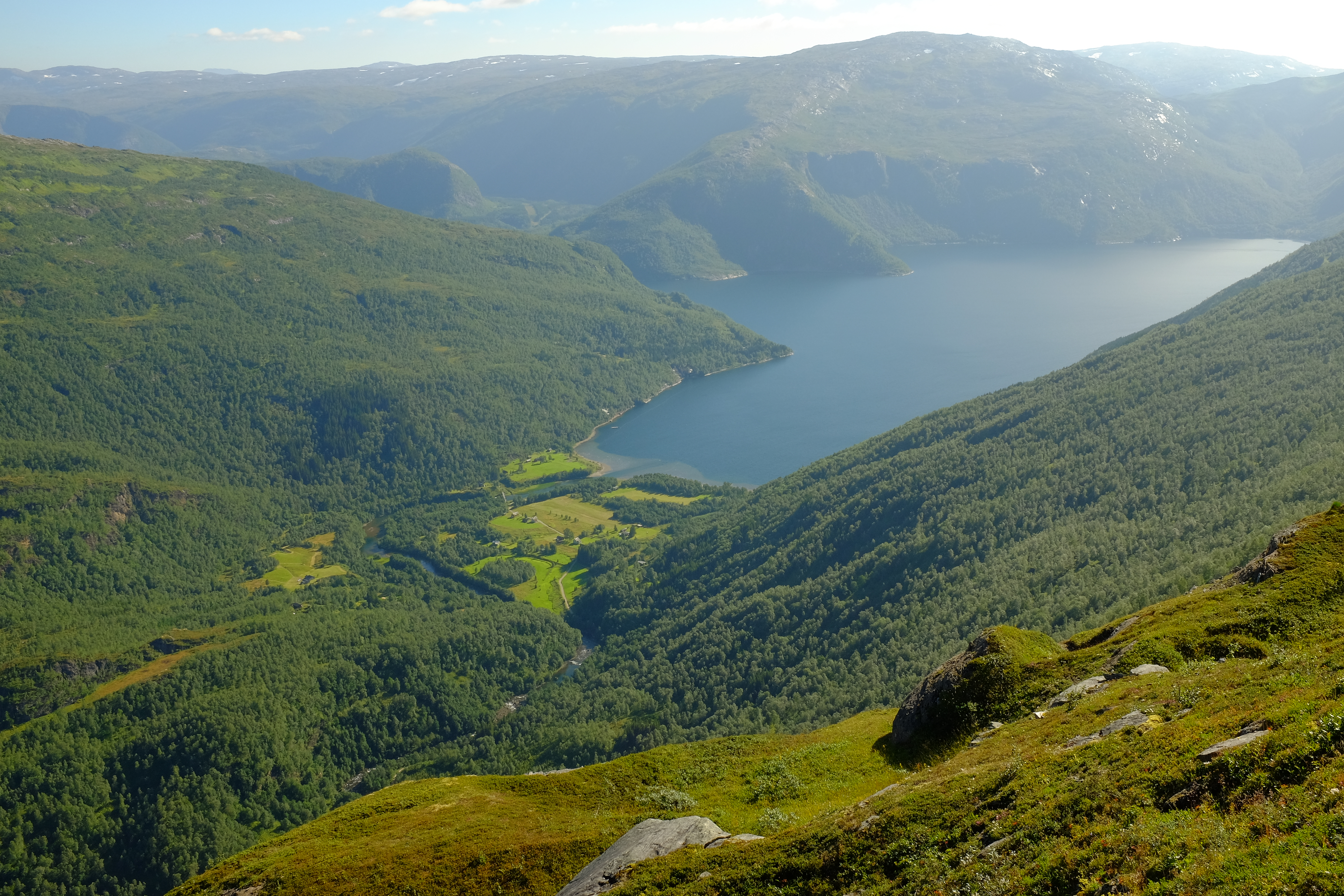
- Lakså seen from the hill Tverrstigfjellet. The Laksåga River empties into Lakså Bay.
- Interactive map of Lakså, Fauske
- Location within Nordland Location within Norway
- Coordinates: 67°14′16″N 15°41′57″E
- Country: Norway
- Region: Northern Norway
- County: Nordland
- District: Salten
- Municipality: Fauske Municipality
- Elevation: 4 m (13 ft)
- Time zone: UTC+01:00 (CET)
  - Summer (DST): UTC+02:00 (CEST)
- Post Code: 8200 Fauske

Lakså (Norwegian) or Láksoavvo (Lule Sami) is a small village in Fauske Municipality in Nordland county, Norway. The village has no permanent residents anymore due to its lack of a road connection. Many of the existing homes in the village are now used as holiday cottages. It is located in a valley on the north shore of the lake Øvervatnet (lit. 'Upper Lake'), about 17 kilometres (11 mi) east of the town of Fauske. There were two farms in the valley: Lakså on the shore of Lakså Bay (Norwegian: Laksåbukta) and Nordal (or Norddal) somewhat further up the valley.

== History ==
The Lakså farm was first mentioned in the rent-roll and census of 1665–1666, where it is referred to as Laxaaen Øegaard. Later, in 1801, several farms were mentioned in the valley: Laxaae, Nordre Laxaae, and Lieland or Laxaaenbakken. At that time there was also a farm further out along the bay called Laxaaemark, later known as Skognes. With the establishment of Fauske Municipality on 1 January 1905, the Lakså farm was assigned the number 93, Nordal (Lakså nordre) was numbered 94, and Skognes (Laksåmark) was numbered 95.

Mons Petter (1807–1888), an impoverished Sami known for having found copper ore in Sulitjelma, came from the Skognes farm in Lakså.

In 1957, the Sulitjelma Line railway was extended to the village of Finneid; this ended the steamship traffic on the lake Øvervatnet, which was previously used for transport to settlements along the lake. The villages along the lake were isolated for several weeks each fall and spring, when ice formed or thawed on the water and was unsafe for travel. Without the steamships, which had created a navigable stretch of open water through the ice, it was no longer possible to travel with one's own boat. The village of Lakså and the smaller nearby villages of Engan and Stifjell were eventually abandoned when all of their permanent residents moved elsewhere.

The old houses in Lakså and Nordal are used as vacation houses. A construction road was built through the valley in the 1960s as part of building the Siso Hydroelectric Power Station. The village formerly had its own school.
