= Stokkviknakken Tunnel =

Road tunnel in Fauske, Norway

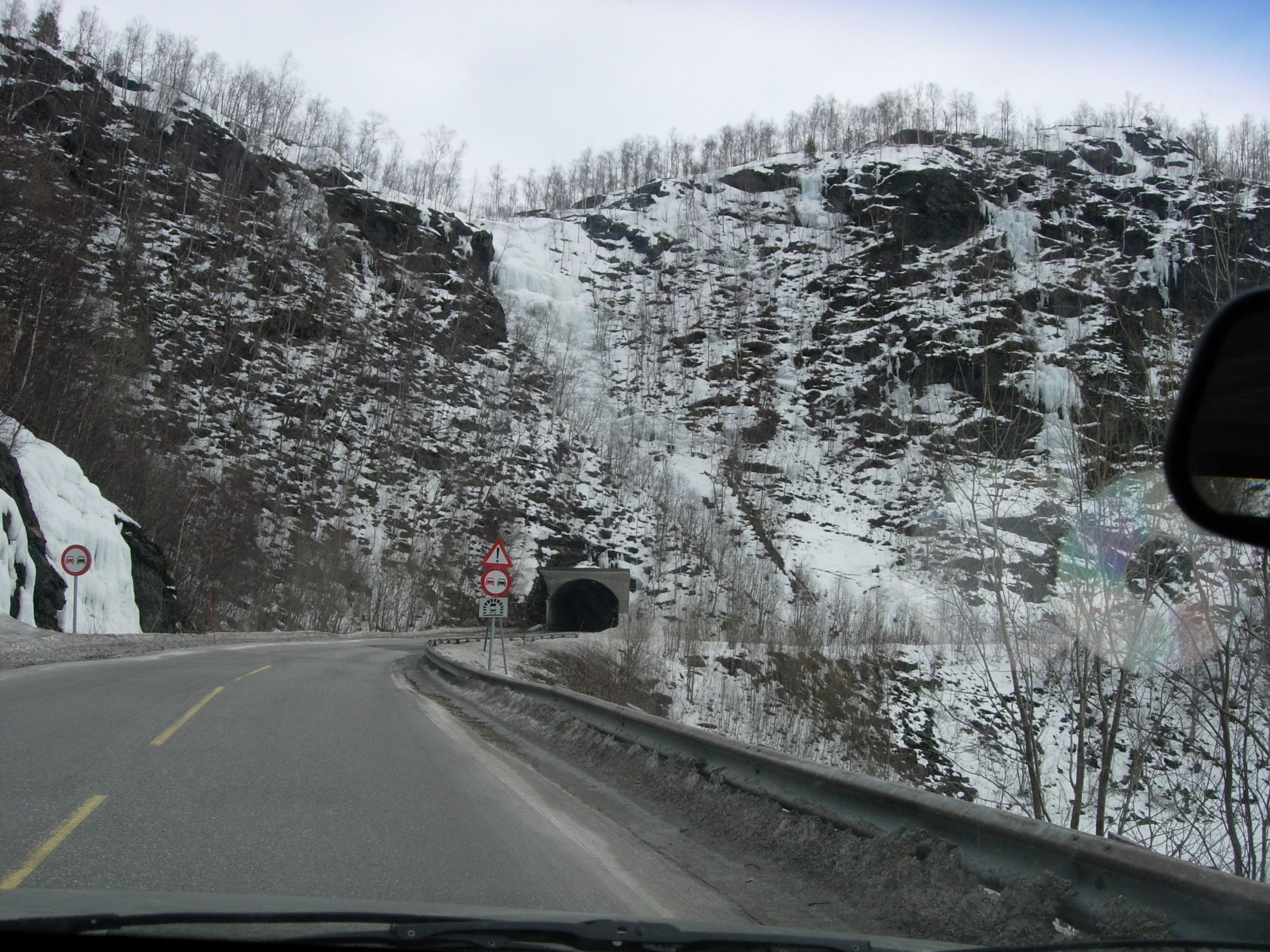
- View of the tunnel

Overview
- Location: Fauske Municipality, Nordland, Norway
- Coordinates: 67.1685°N 15.7550°E
- Route: Fv830

Operation
- Opened: 1962/1975
- Traffic: Automotive

Technical
- Length: 568 metres (1,864 ft)

The Stokkviknakken Tunnel (Norwegian: Stokkviknakkentunnelen) is a road tunnel that is part of Norwegian County Road 830 in Fauske Municipality in Nordland county, Norway. It is located between Finneid in the town of Fauske and the village of Sulitjelma. It is located about 4 kilometres (2.5 mi) east of a series of three long tunnels on the road.

The 568-metre (1,864 ft) long tunnel was originally built in 1962 as part of the Sulitjelma Line between Finneid and Sulitjelma. The tunnel was built to shorten the overall length of the railroad by straightening the path and going through a mountain rather than curving around it. The railway line was closed and dismantled in 1972. The tunnel was rebuilt soon after when the old railway line was converted into a highway which opened in 1975.

== See also ==
- Grønnlifjell Tunnel
- Hårskolten Tunnel
- Sjønståfjell Tunnel
