= Hårskolten Tunnel =

Road tunnel in Fauske, Norway

Hårskolten Tunnel Hårskoltentunnelen
- Interactive map of Hårskolten Tunnel; Hårskoltentunnelen

Overview
- Location: Fauske Municipality, Nordland, Norway
- Coordinates: 67.2128°N 15.5981°E
- Route: Fv830
- Start: Solvik
- End: Storvika

Operation
- Opened: 1956/1975
- Traffic: Automotive

Technical
- Length: 2,425 metres (7,956 ft)

The Hårskolten Tunnel (Norwegian: Hårskolttunnelen) is a road tunnel that is part of Norwegian County Road 830 in Fauske Municipality in Nordland county, Norway. It is located between Finneid in the town of Fauske and the village of Sulitjelma. This tunnel is the middle tunnel in a series of three tunnels on this road. The Grønnlifjell Tunnel lies immediately to the east of this tunnel and the Sjønståfjell Tunnel lies immediately to the west of this tunnel.

The 2,425-metre (7,956 ft) long tunnel was originally built in 1956 as part of an expansion of the Sulitjelma Line between Finneid and Sulitjelma. The railway line was closed and dismantled in 1972. The tunnel was rebuilt soon after when the old railway line was converted into a highway which opened in 1975.

== See also ==
- Grønnlifjell Tunnel
- Sjønståfjell Tunnel
- Stokkviknakken Tunnel
