= Mons Andreas Petersen =

Norwegian farmer (1829–1886)

- Born: April 6, 1829
- Died: November 15, 1886 (aged 57)
- Other name: Mons Petter

Mons Andreas Petersen, best known as Mons Petter (sometimes Mons Peter; April 6, 1829 – November 16, 1886), was a Norwegian Sami farmer who discovered ore deposits in Sulitjelma in 1858.

Mons Petter was a Sami farmer from the Skognes farm in Lakså along the shore of Øvervatnet (lit. 'Upper Lake') in what is now Fauske Municipality (at that time it was part of the parish of Skjerstad). In the summers, he used to haul timber out from the pine forests of the area around the lake Langvatnet (lit. 'Long Lake') about 32 kilometers (20 mi) to the southeast. He had noticed veins of rust in the mountains. In 1858, he found ore there that he thought was gold. He took his find to the merchant Bernhard Koch in Venset, who determined that it was not gold based on its weight. In fact, he had found chalcopyrite (a golden yellow copper ore) and pyrite (fool's gold).

The discovery led to the establishment of Sulitjelma Mines (Norwegian: Sulitjelma gruber), which began operations in 1891.

The Mons Petter Festival is held annually in Sulitjelma in late June to celebrate the area's mining history.
