= Grønnlifjell Tunnel =

Road tunnel in Fauske, Norway

Grønnlifjell Tunnel Grønnfjelltunnelen
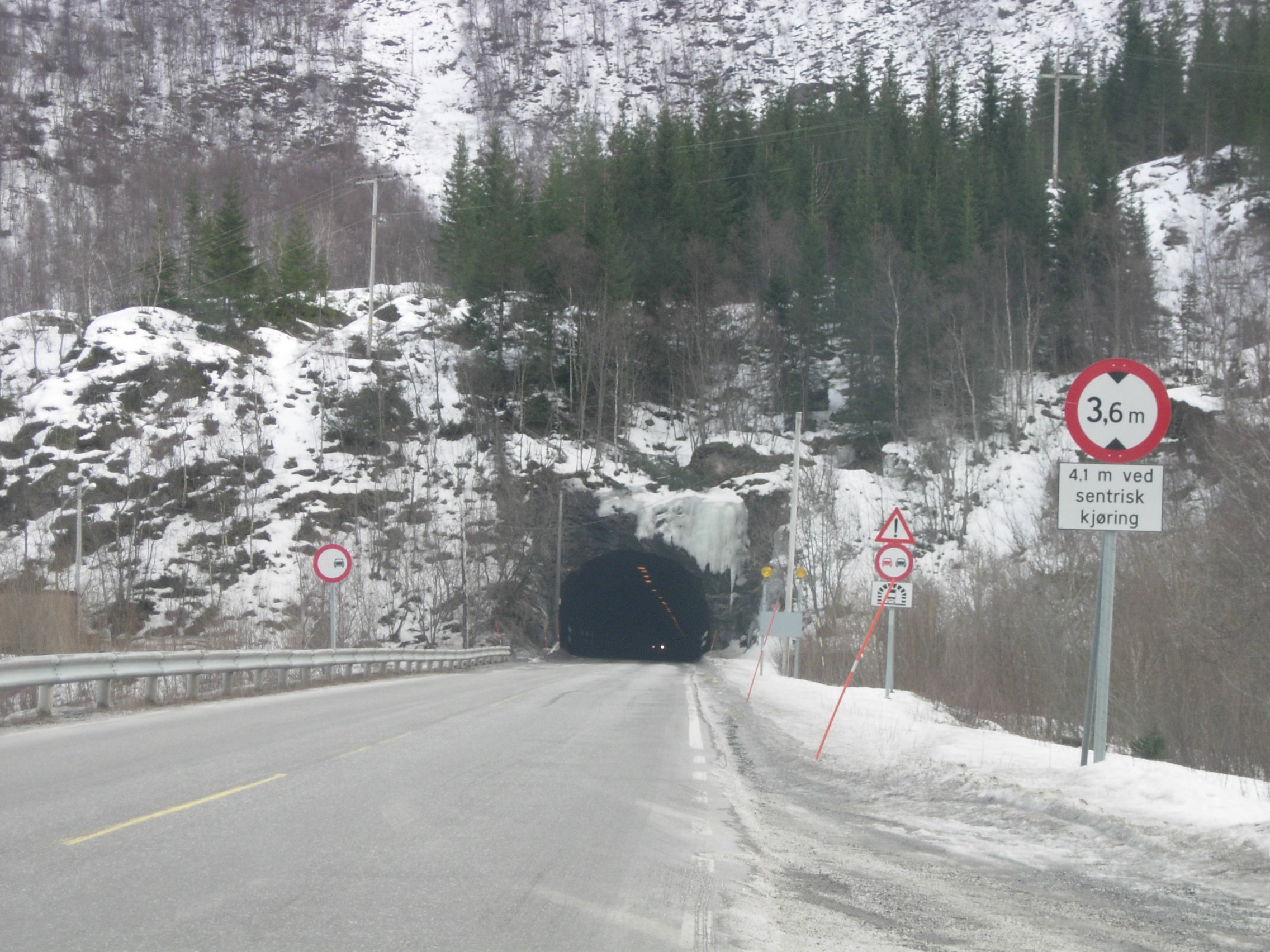
- View of Grønnlifjell Tunnel
- Interactive map of Grønnlifjell Tunnel; Grønnfjelltunnelen

Overview
- Location: Fauske Municipality, Nordland, Norway
- Coordinates: 67.2256°N 15.5393°E
- Route: Fv830
- Start: Moen
- End: Solvik

Operation
- Opened: 1956/1975
- Traffic: Automotive

Technical
- Length: 2,811 metres (9,222 ft)

The Grønnlifjell Tunnel (Norwegian: Grønnlifjelltunnelen) is a road tunnel that is part of Norwegian County Road 830 in Fauske Municipality in Nordland county, Norway. It is located between Finneid in the town of Fauske and the village of Sulitjelma. This tunnel is part of a series of three tunnels on this road. The Sjønståfjell Tunnel and the Hårskolten Tunnel both lie to the east of this tunnel.

The 2,811-metre (9,222 ft) long tunnel was originally built in 1956 as part of an expansion of the Sulitjelma Line between Finneid and Sulitjelma. The railway line was closed and dismantled in 1972. The tunnel was rebuilt soon after when the old railway line was converted into a highway which opened in 1975.

== See also ==
- Hårskolten Tunnel
- Sjønståfjell Tunnel
- Stokkviknakken Tunnel
