= Sjønståfjell Tunnel =

Road tunnel in Fauske, Norway

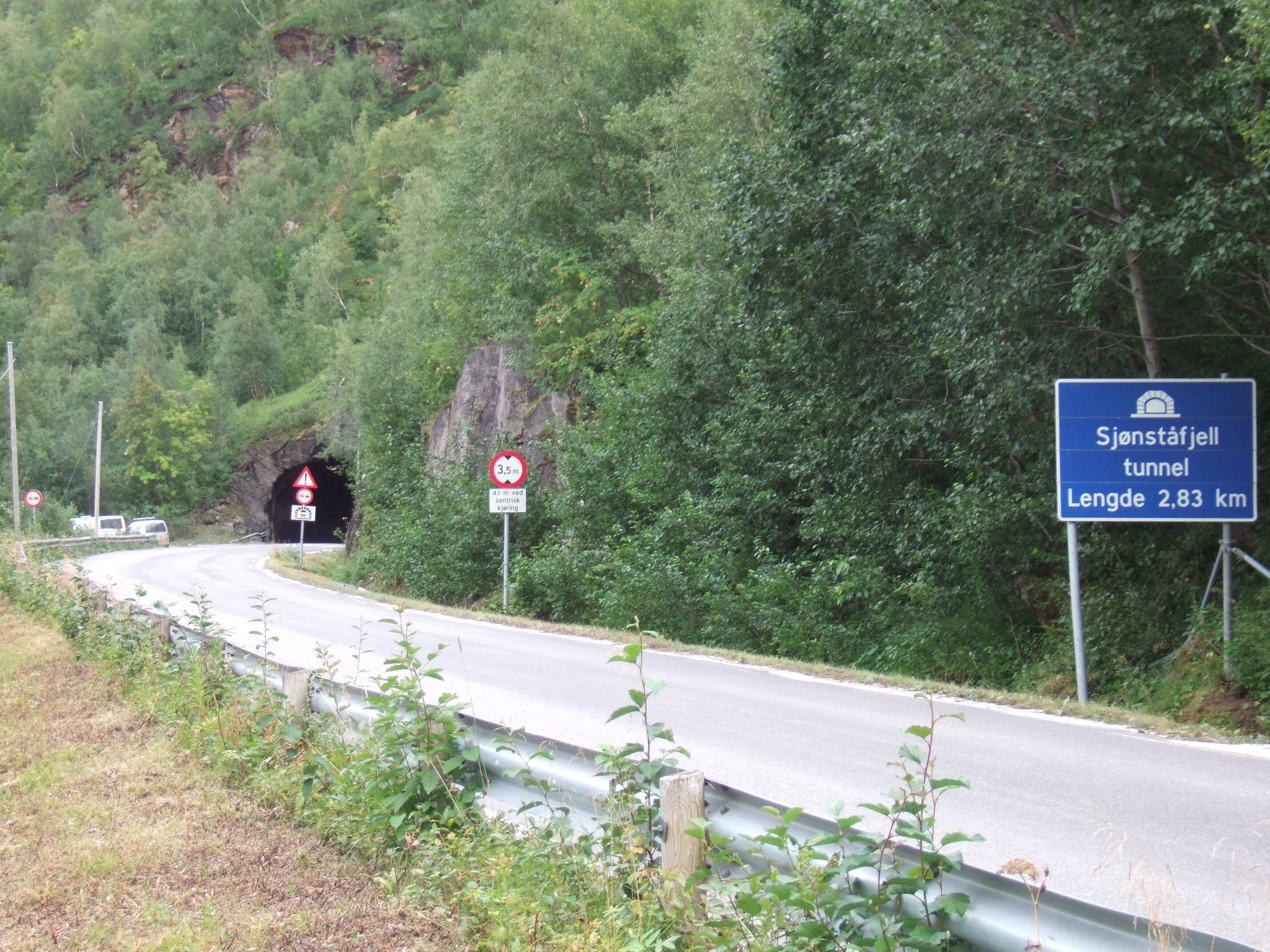
- Interactive map of Sjønståfjell Tunnel

Overview
- Location: Fauske Municipality, Nordland, Norway
- Coordinates: 67.1991°N 15.6670°E
- Route: Fv830
- Start: Storvika
- End: near Sjønstå

Operation
- Opened: 1956/1975
- Traffic: Automotive

Technical
- Length: 2,827 metres (9,275 ft)

The Sjønståfjell Tunnel (Norwegian: Sjønståfjelltunnelen) is a road tunnel that is part of Norwegian County Road 830 in Fauske Municipality in Nordland county, Norway. It is located between Finneid in the town of Fauske and the village of Sulitjelma. This tunnel is part of a series of three tunnels on this road. The Grønnlifjell Tunnel and the Hårskolten Tunnel both lie to the west of this tunnel.

The 2,827-metre (9,275 ft) long tunnel was originally built in 1956 as part of an expansion of the Sulitjelma Line between Finneid and Sulitjelma. The railway line was closed and dismantled in 1972. The tunnel was rebuilt soon after when the old railway line was converted into a highway which opened in 1975.

== See also ==
- Grønnlifjell Tunnel
- Hårskolten Tunnel
- Stokkviknakken Tunnel
