= Sjønståelva =

River in Fauske, Norway

Sjønståelva Langvasselva
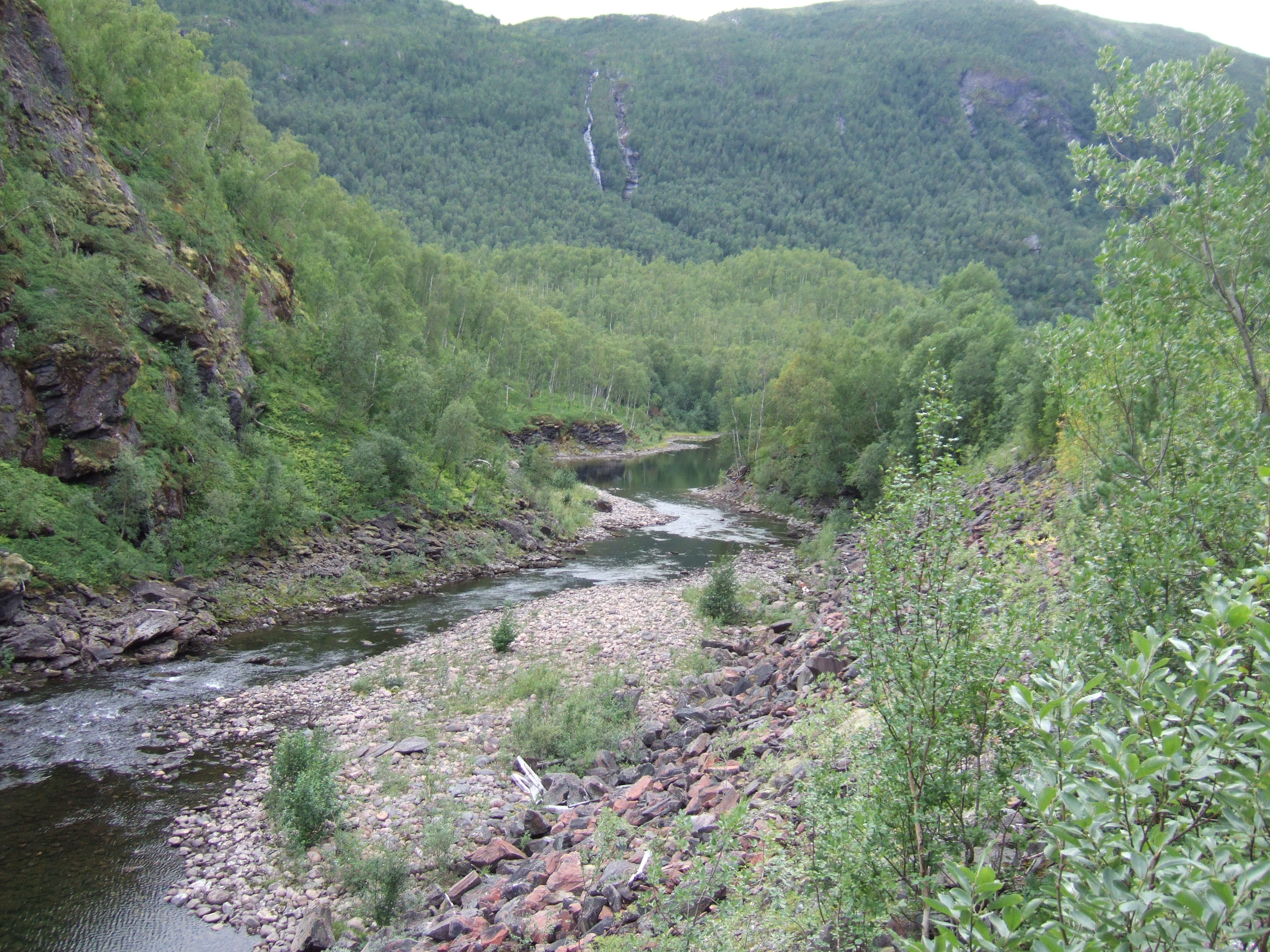
- The Sjønståelva in low-flow conditions. Picture taken below the hill Stokkviknakken
- Interactive map of the river

Location
- Country: Norway
- County: Nordland
- Municipality: Fauske Municipality

Physical characteristics
- Source: Langvatnet
  - location: Langvann Valley, Fauske
  - coordinates: 67.167965°N 15.88831°E
  - elevation: 127 metres (417 ft)
- Mouth: Øvervatnet
  - location: Sjønstå, Fauske
  - coordinates: 67.20571°N 15.71478°E
  - elevation: 1 metre (3 ft 3 in)
- Length: 12.7 km (7.9 mi)
- Basin size: 779.45 km^{2} (300.95 sq mi)
- Discharge
  - average: 32.8 m^{3}/s (1,160 cu ft/s)

Basin features
- River system: Sulitjelma basin

The Sjønståelva, known as the Langvasselva in its upper course, is a river in Fauske Municipality in Nordland county, Norway. The river is located in the valley between the town of Fauske and the village of Sulitjelma.

== Geography ==
The Sjønståelva is the main river of the Sulitjelma drainage system. The stretch from its source at Langvatnet (Long Lake) to the village of Sjønstå, where it empties into the lake Øvervatnet (lit. 'Upper Lake') has been developed into the Sjønstå Hydroelectric Power Station. The river has many small tributaries. Norwegian County Road 830 runs parallel to the Sjønståelva. The Sulitjelma Line formerly ran along the river. The drainage system is regulated by many hydroelectric stations. The river is 12.7 kilometers (7.9 mi) long and has a drainage basin of 779.45 square kilometers (300.95 sq mi). The river's average discharge is 32.8 cubic meters per second (1,160 cu ft/s).

The river gently flows from Langvatnet, but it has some rapids. The only waterfall is located at contour level 60 m (200 ft), where the river runs through narrow sections with steep hillsides. The river has been seriously affected by pollution. After the Sjønstå power plant was built, large quantities of water flowed from Langvatnet down to Øvervatnet, and this has led to less pollution. The lower part of the river supports salmon and has a permanent population of trout.

== Hydroelectricity ==
There are several hydroelectric power stations on the river operated by Salten Kraftsamband:

- The Sjønstå Hydroelectric Power Station with an installed capacity of 35 MW and an average annual production of 282 GWh
- The Lomi Hydroelectric Power Station with an installed capacity of 60 MW and an average annual production of 362 GWh
- The Fagerli Hydroelectric Power Station with an installed capacity of 24 MW and an average annual production of 252 GWh
- The Daja Hydroelectric Power Station with an installed capacity of 15 MW and an average annual production of 157 GWh

In 2013, a concession was requested from the Norwegian Water Resources and Energy Directorate to build the Sjønstå Falls Hydroelectric Power Station. It is planned to have an intake at 58.4 meters (192 ft) at the existing threshold in the river. The installed capacity will be about 2.7 MW. According to the plan, the average annual production will be 7.3 GWh. The development will create a further reduction in water flow on a 1,370-meter (4,490 ft) stretch of the Sjønståelva. The planned release from the plant is a minimum of 600 liters per second (21 cu ft/s) in the summer season and 150 liters per second (5.3 cu ft/s) in the winter season.

There are also plans to create the Lappland Hydroelectric Power Station, which, if it is realized, will change the flow of water in the Sjønståelva significantly by drawing large quantities of water from Swedish watercourses into Norway.
