= Bajep Sårjåsjávrre =

Lake in Nordland, Norway

- Historic: Sorjosjávri, bajit
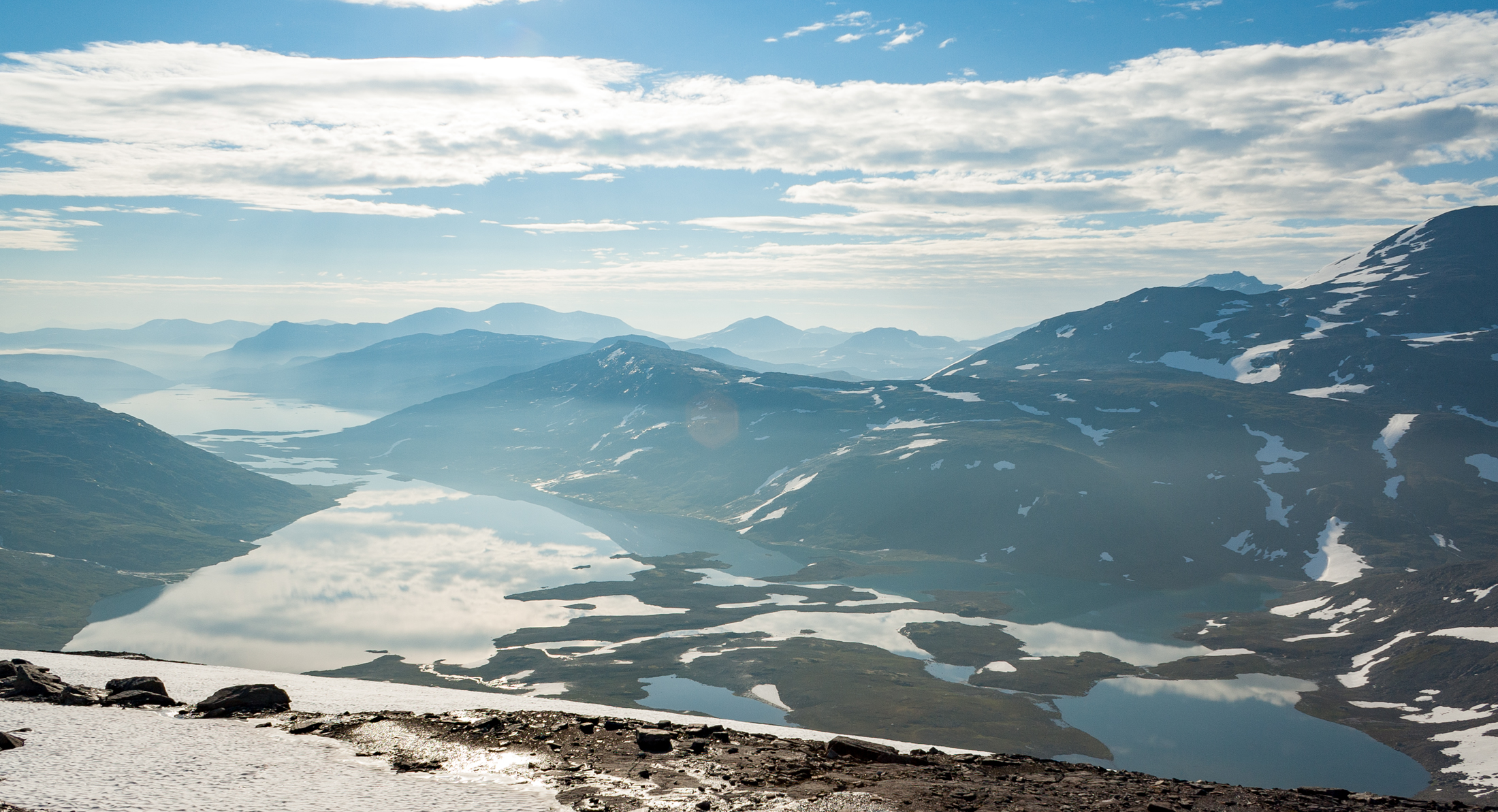
- Bajep Sårjåsjávrre
- Interactive map of the lake
- Location: Fauske Municipality, Nordland
- Coordinates: 67.217764°N 16.266242°E
- Basin countries: Norway
- Max. length: 2.3 kilometers (1.4 mi)
- Max. width: 1 kilometer (0.62 mi)
- Surface area: 1.6 km^{2} (0.62 sq mi)
- Shore length^{1}: 8 kilometers (5.0 mi)
- Surface elevation: 822 meters (2,697 ft)
- References: Norgeskart: Bajep Sårjåsjávrre, Vann Fauske, NVE
- ^{1} Shore length is not a well-defined measure.

Bajep Sårjåsjávrre (transl. Upper Lake Sårjås) is a lake that lies on the northern edge of the Sulitjelma massif near the border between Norway and Sweden. It lies immediately west of larger Vuolep Sårjåsjávrre (Lower Lake Sårjås), which straddles the border between the two countries. The 1.6-square-kilometer (0.62 sq mi) lake lies just to the east of the large Blåmann Glacier.

== See also ==
- List of lakes in Norway
