= Sulitjelma Church =

Church in Nordland, Norway

- Sulitjelma kirke
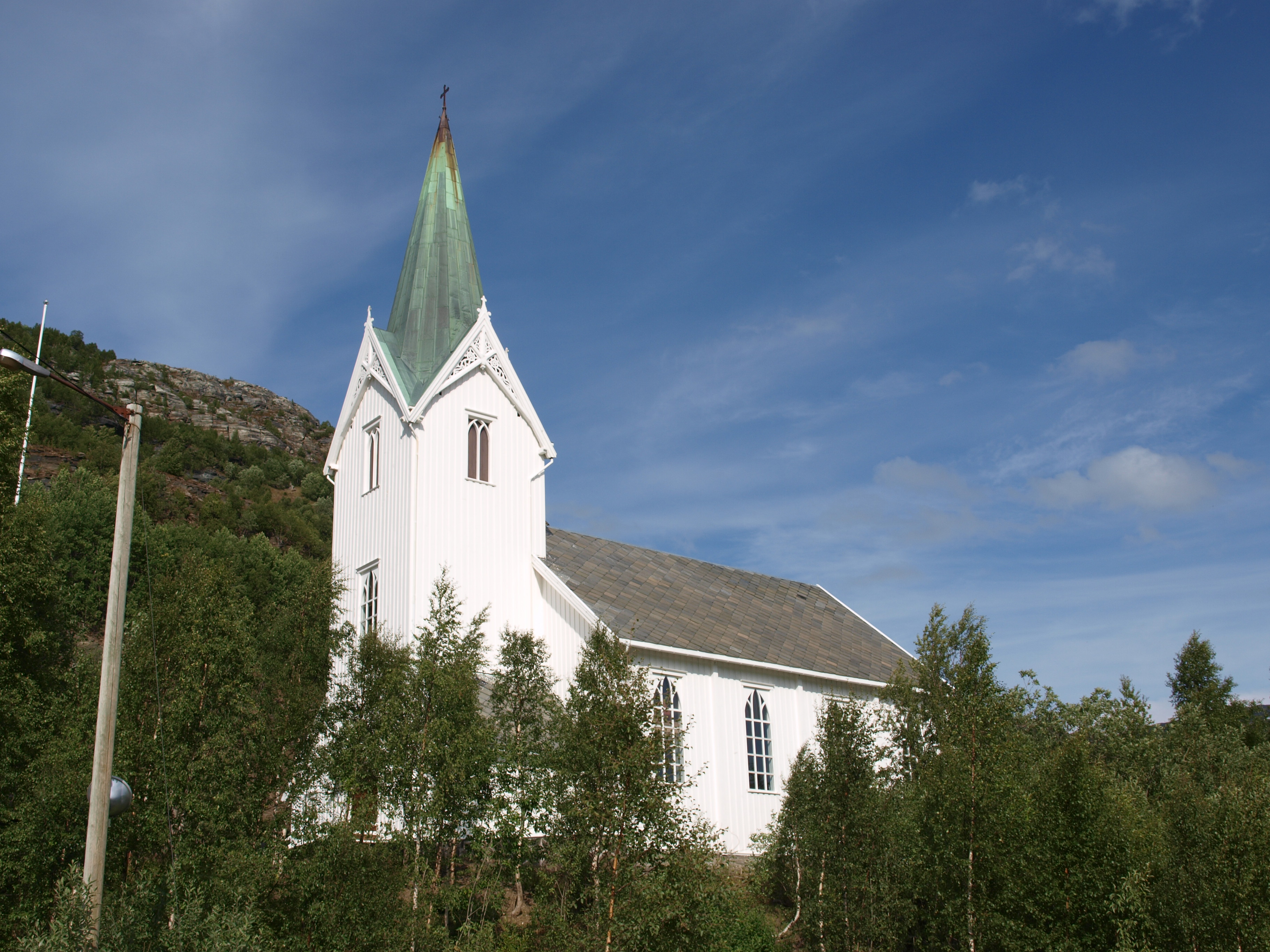
- View of the church
- Sulitjelma Church
- 67.1356324°N 16.0577657°E
- Location: Fauske Municipality, Nordland
- Country: Norway
- Denomination: Church of Norway
- Churchmanship: Evangelical Lutheran

History
- Status: Parish church
- Founded: 1899
- Consecrated: 12 Nov 1899

Architecture
- Functional status: Active
- Architect: Worm Hirsch Lund
- Architectural type: Long church
- Completed: 1899 (127 years ago)

Specifications
- Capacity: 300
- Materials: Wood

Administration
- Diocese: Sør-Hålogaland
- Deanery: Salten prosti
- Parish: Sulitjelma
- Norwegian Cultural Heritage Site
- Type: Church
- Status: Listed
- ID: 84997

Sulitjelma Church (Norwegian: Sulitjelma kirke) is a parish church of the Church of Norway in Fauske Municipality in Nordland county, Norway. It is located in the village of Sulitjelma. It is the church for the Sulitjelma parish which is part of the Salten prosti (deanery) in the Diocese of Sør-Hålogaland. The white, wooden church was built in a long church style in 1899 using plans drawn up by the architect Worm Hirsch Lund. The church seats about 300 people.

== History ==
The parish received permission via a royal resolution on 27 May 1899 to construct a church in Sulitjelma. Construction began soon afterwards. The building was consecrated on 12 November 1899 by Bishop Peter Wilhelm Bøckman (1851–1926). In 1996, a new parish graveyard was built on the southern part of the village, and the Sulitjelma Chapel was built on that site.

== Media gallery ==
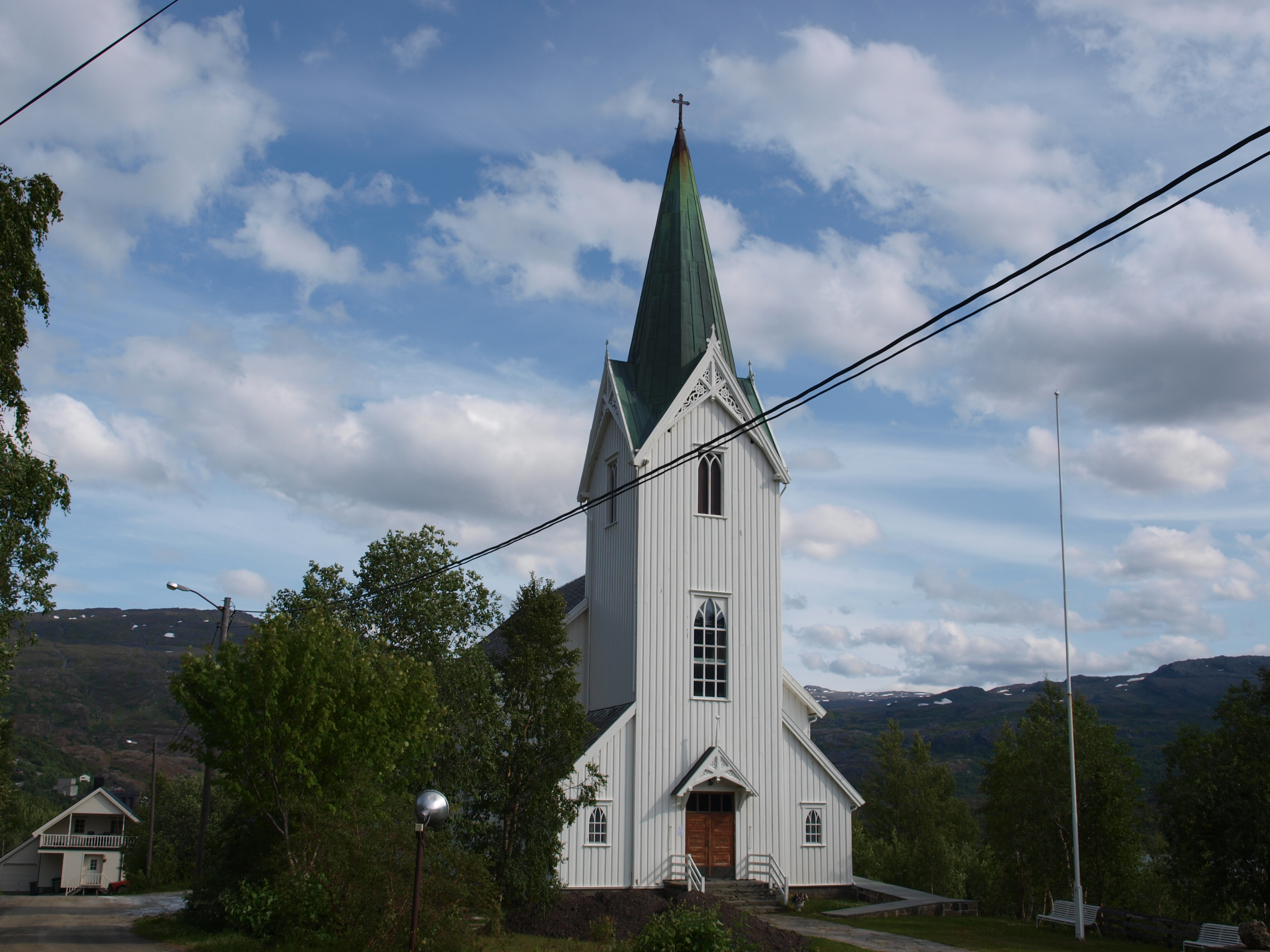

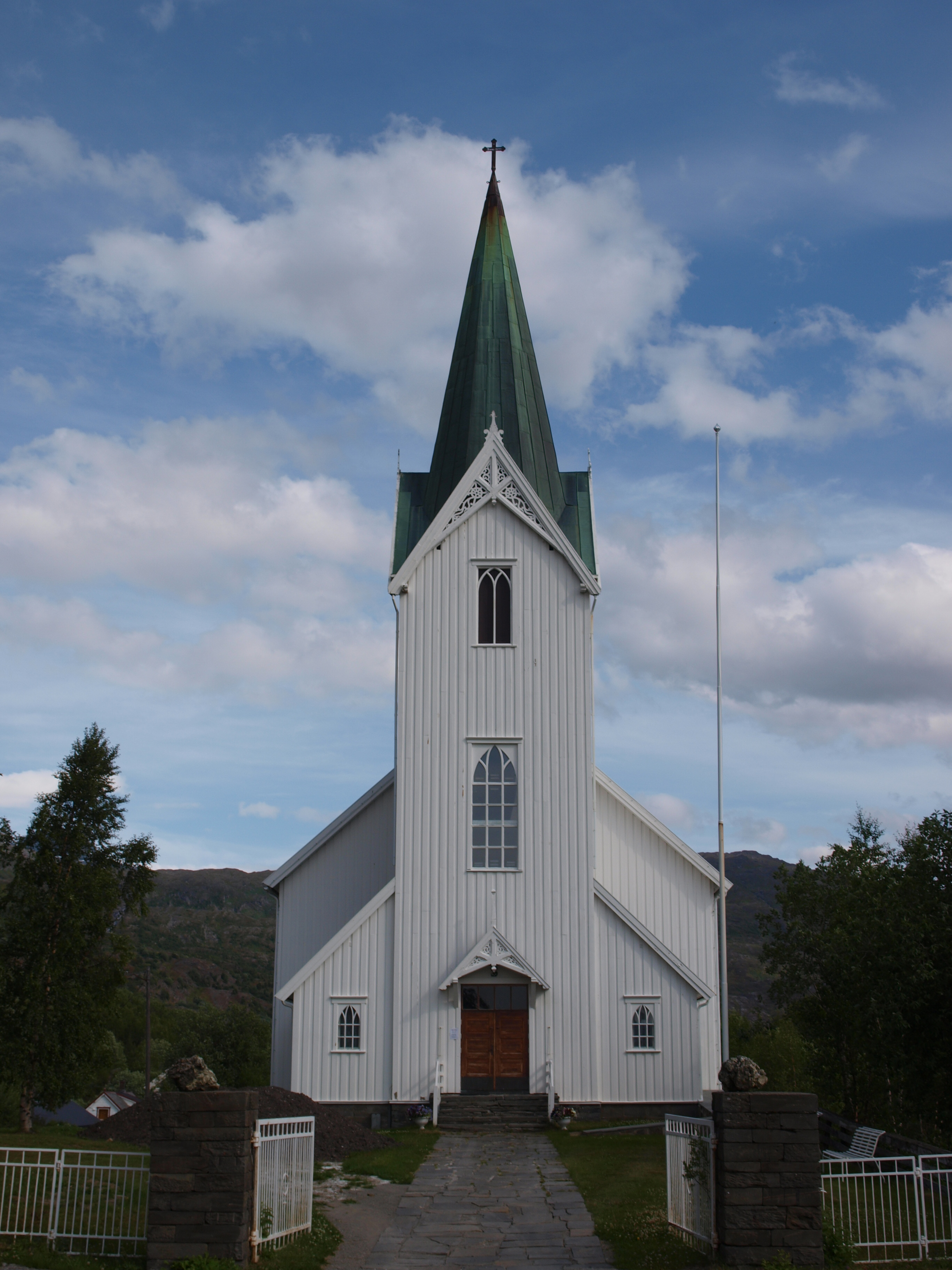

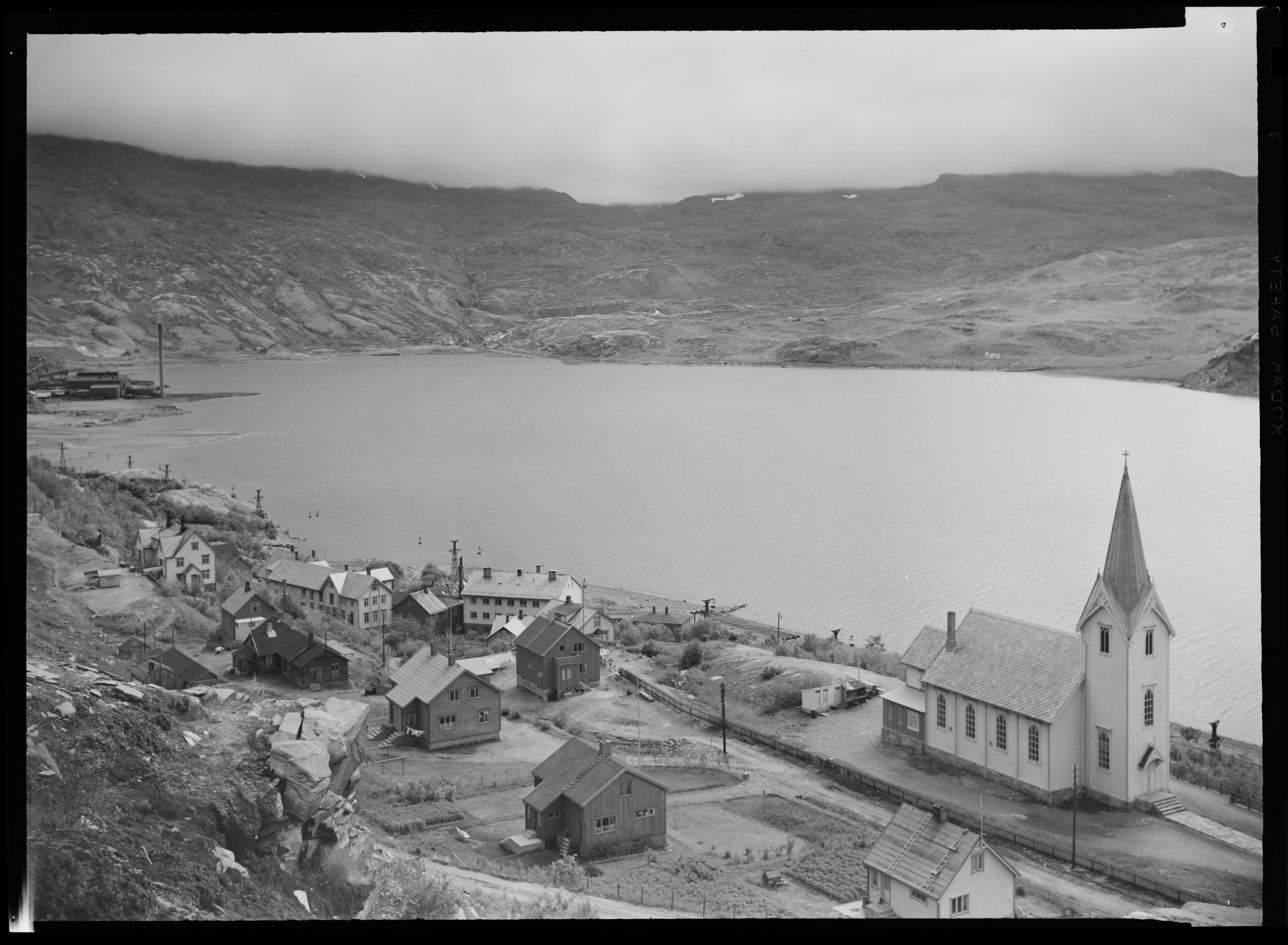

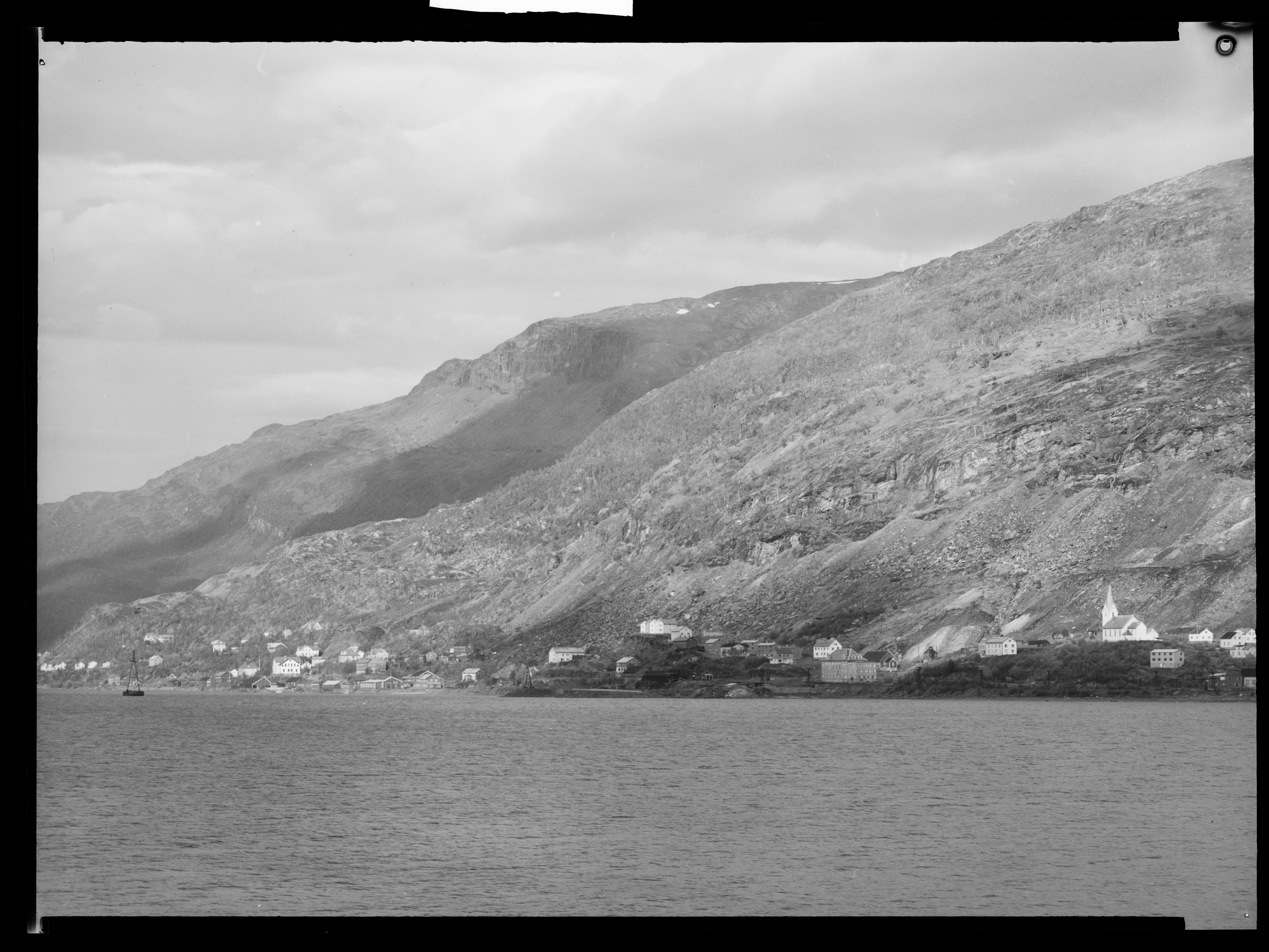

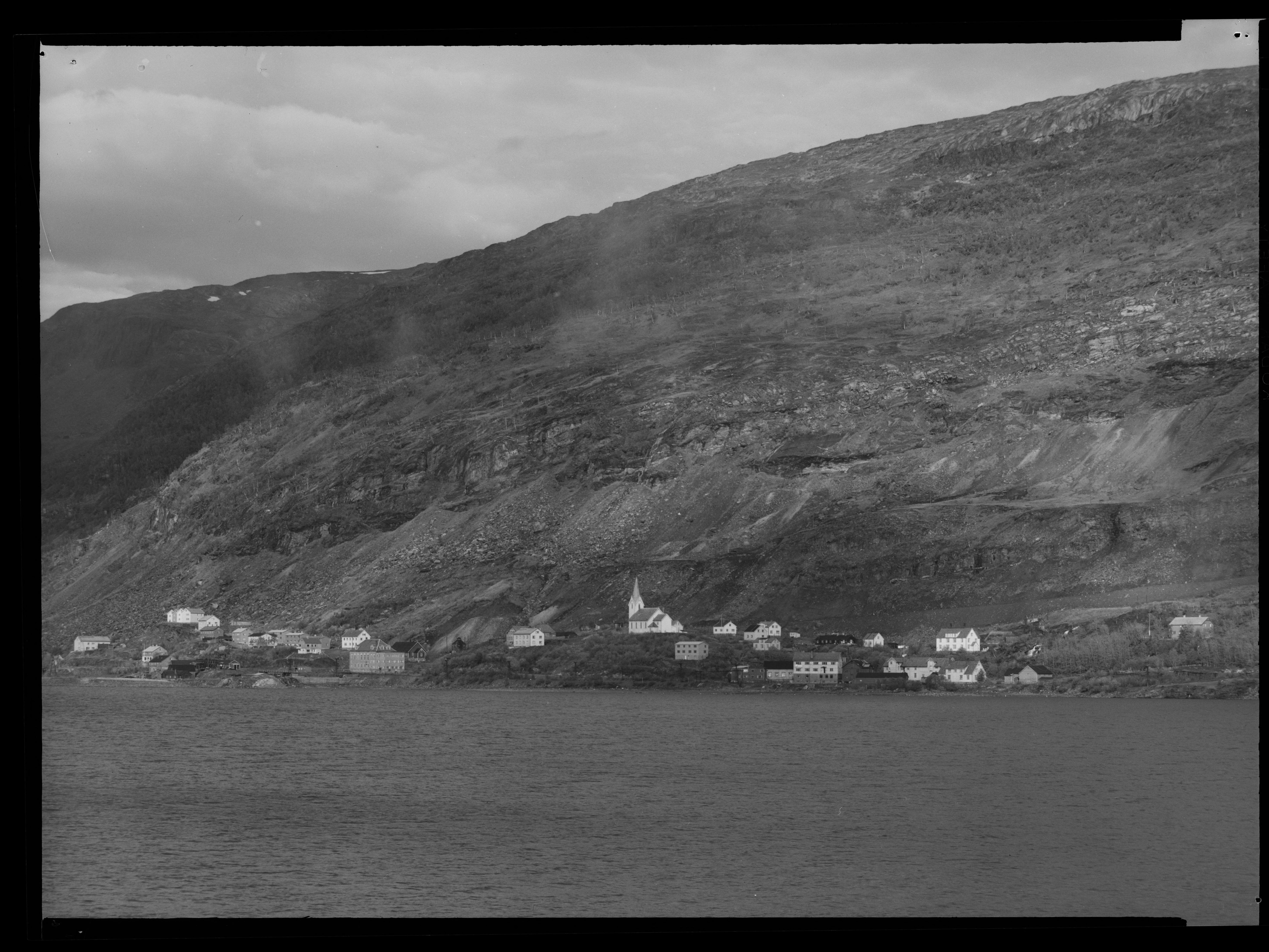

== See also ==
- List of churches in Sør-Hålogaland
