= Vuolep Sårjåsjávrre =

Lake in Norway and Sweden

- Interactive map of the lake
- Location: Fauske, Nordland and Jokkmokk, Norrbotten
- Coordinates: 67.2236°N 16.3602°E
- Basin countries: Sweden and Norway
- Max. length: 6 kilometres (3.7 mi)
- Max. width: 2 kilometres (1.2 mi)
- Surface area: 7.17 km^{2} (2.77 sq mi)
- Shore length^{1}: 28.52 kilometres (17.72 mi)
- Surface elevation: 820 metres (2,690 ft)
- References: NVE
- ^{1} Shore length is not a well-defined measure.

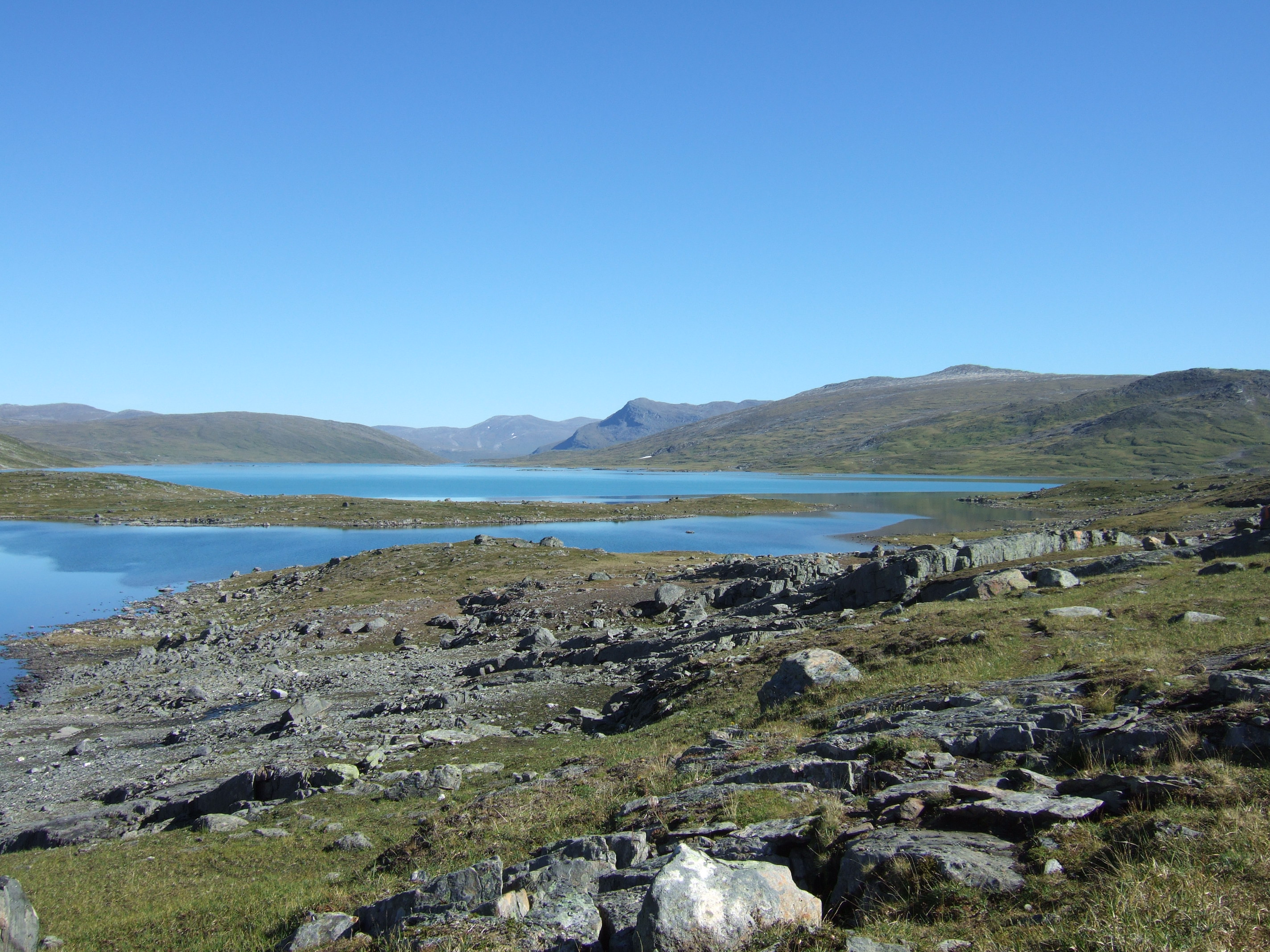
Sårjåsjávrre seen from Sulitjelma mountains, Norway.

Vuolep Sårjåsjávrre (lit. 'Lower Lake Sårjås') is a lake which lies on the border between Norway and Sweden. The western part lies in Fauske Municipality in Nordland county, Norway, and the eastern part lies in Jokkmokk Municipality in Norrbotten County, Sweden. The 7.17-square-kilometre (2.77 sq mi) lake lies just to the east of the large Blåmannsisen glacier and smaller neighboring lake Bajep Sårjåsjávrre (lit. 'Upper Lake Sårjås').

== See also ==
- List of lakes in Norway
