= Sulitjelma Chapel =

Church in Nordland, Norway

- Sulitjelma kapell
- Sulitjelma Chapel
- 67.12341065°N 16.0689908°E
- Location: Fauske Municipality, Nordland
- Country: Norway
- Denomination: Church of Norway
- Churchmanship: Evangelical Lutheran

History
- Status: Annex chapel
- Founded: 1996
- Consecrated: 1996

Architecture
- Functional status: Active
- Architectural type: Long church
- Completed: 1996 (30 years ago)

Specifications
- Materials: Wood

Administration
- Diocese: Sør-Hålogaland
- Deanery: Salten prosti
- Parish: Sulitjelma

Sulitjelma Chapel (Norwegian: Sulitjelma kapell) is a chapel of the Church of Norway in Fauske Municipality in Nordland county, Norway. It is located in the village of Sulitjelma. It is an annex chapel in the Sulitjelma parish which is part of the Salten prosti (deanery) in the Diocese of Sør-Hålogaland. The small, red, wooden chapel was built in a long church style in 1996 on the site of the new church graveyard on the south side of the village since the old graveyard for the Sulitjelma Church had no more room to expand.

== See also ==
- List of churches in Sør-Hålogaland
