= Norwegian County Road 830 =

County road in Fauske, Norway

County Road 830

Route information
- Length: 35.64 km (22.15 mi)

Major junctions
- West end: E6 at Finneid
- East end: Fv543 at Sulitjelma

Location
- Country: Norway
- Counties: Nordland

Highway system
- Roads in Norway; National Roads; County Roads

County Road 830 (Norwegian: Fylkesvei 830) is a 35.64-kilometer (22.15 mi) road in Fauske Municipality in Nordland County, Norway. It runs between Finneid, where it branches off from European route E6, and the village of Sulitjelma, where it continues as County Road 543.

The road was laid out along the bed of the former Sulitjelma Line railway, which was shut down in 1972. Work on converting the rail route for road traffic began on July 2, 1971. Over the course of three weeks, starting on July 24, 1972, the tracks were demolished and the road was made drivable. Further work on the road (including tunnel work) was carried out until 1975.

There are several tunnels on the road, including the Grønnlifjell Tunnel, Hårskolten Tunnel, Sjønståfjell Tunnel, and Stokkviknakken Tunnel. The route has been proposed for protection by the Norwegian National Protection Plan for Roads, Bridges, and Road-Related Cultural Heritage. Until January 1, 2010 the route was a national road. After the national road network regional reform came into force, the route was reassigned the status of a county road.
