= Sulitjelma Mines =

Norwegian mining company

Coordinates: 67°07′59″N 16°04′50″E

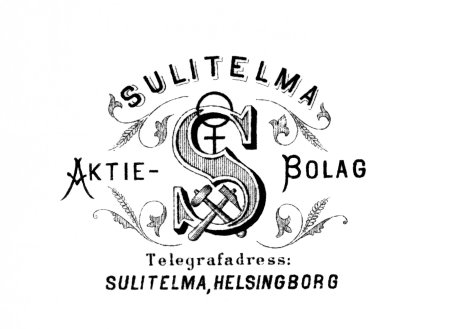
- Founded: 1891 in Norway
- Founder: Nils Persson
- Defunct: June 21, 1991
- Headquarters: Norway
- Products: Sulfur, copper, zinc
- Number of employees: 1750 (1913)

Sulitjelma Mines (Norwegian: Sulitjelma gruber) was a Norwegian mining company that extracted copper, pyrite, and zinc at Sulitjelma in Fauske Municipality in Nordland county, Norway. Operations started with a test mine in 1887. From 1891 to 1933, the business was registered as a Swedish company called Sulitelma Aktiebolags Gruber. From 1933 to 1983, it was registered as a Norwegian company called A/S Sulitjelma Gruber, and from 1983 until it was shut down in 1991 the company was state-owned and was named Sulitjelma Bergverk AS.

Chalcopyrite was found by the Sami Mons Andreas Petersen around 1858, but due to the very remote location of the place there was skepticism that the deposits could be commercially viable. It was only when the Swedish industrialist and consul Nils Persson gained interest in the ore deposits in 1886 that progress was made in developing mining in Sulitelma. The company Sulitelma Aktiebolags Gruber was founded in 1891. That same year, the narrow-gauge Sulitjelma Line was built. An electric power station was built in 1893, soon followed by a copper smelter. Until 1956, copper and semi-finished products were transported by train and steamship to the port at Finneid. Transport was an expensive part of the operations throughout the history of the mining company.

Several technical innovations and inventions were made at Sulitjelma, including the Knudsen process and some of the world's first electric copper smelters. Later in the history of the works many other improvements were made, especially in concentrating ore and smelting. In the early 1900s, Sulitjelma Mines was the second-largest industrial company in Norway.

Sulitjelma was initially an isolated mountain village inhabited by pioneer settlers, but the population increased rapidly in pace with mining, from about 50 around 1890 to almost 3,000 in 1910. The living conditions for the workers were very primitive, and the working conditions were difficult and hazardous to health. The class differences between workers, foremen, and officials were noticeable, and the mining company management maintained control over the workers by force. Attempts by the workers to secure better conditions were brutally put down, and many miners, seeing no other work opportunities in the area, submitted to the harsh conditions. However, tensions between workers and management grew.

In the winter of 1907, management instigated a new control system, insisting miners wear a numbered lead tag when in the mines. This was strongly resisted by the workers. They met in a large-scale assembly at the only place not owned by the mining company—the ice of Long Lake (Langvatnet)—on January 13, 1907, and founded the first labor union to strike for better conditions and workers' rights. This led to gradual improvements. Events in the Sulitjelma mines, leading up to the formation of the union are depicted in the Norwegian historical drama The Riot, released in 2023.

Sulitjelma became a stronghold for the labor movement and radicalism in the region. Local workers, under the leadership of Johan Medby, were involved in anti-conscription campaigns during World War I.

After Germany invaded Norway in 1940, during the Second World War, Sulitjelma Mines was used for the German war industry. The mines were considered to be so important for Germany that production had to be maintained at all costs. Although the Gestapo knew that employees were engaged in illegal activities, they failed to intervene because they feared that the arrest of key personnel would impact production.

The upswing after the Second World War turned to uncertainty when copper prices fell sharply in 1975. The weakened profitability that followed led to economizing operations and dismissals. Then there was also a need for large investments in the old plant. Among other things, pollution from the smelting hut had become an increasing problem that could only be solved with a costly treatment plant. Remedial measures were taken, but these were subsequently considered unsuccessful. Mining ceased in 1991.

In its approximately 100 years of operation, six million tons of metal and sulfur were extracted. Most of this was sulfur. The remainder was 0.47 million tons of copper, 215 tons of zinc, 282 tons of silver, and 3.7 tons of gold.
