= Sulitjelma Line =

Former railway line in Fauske, Norway

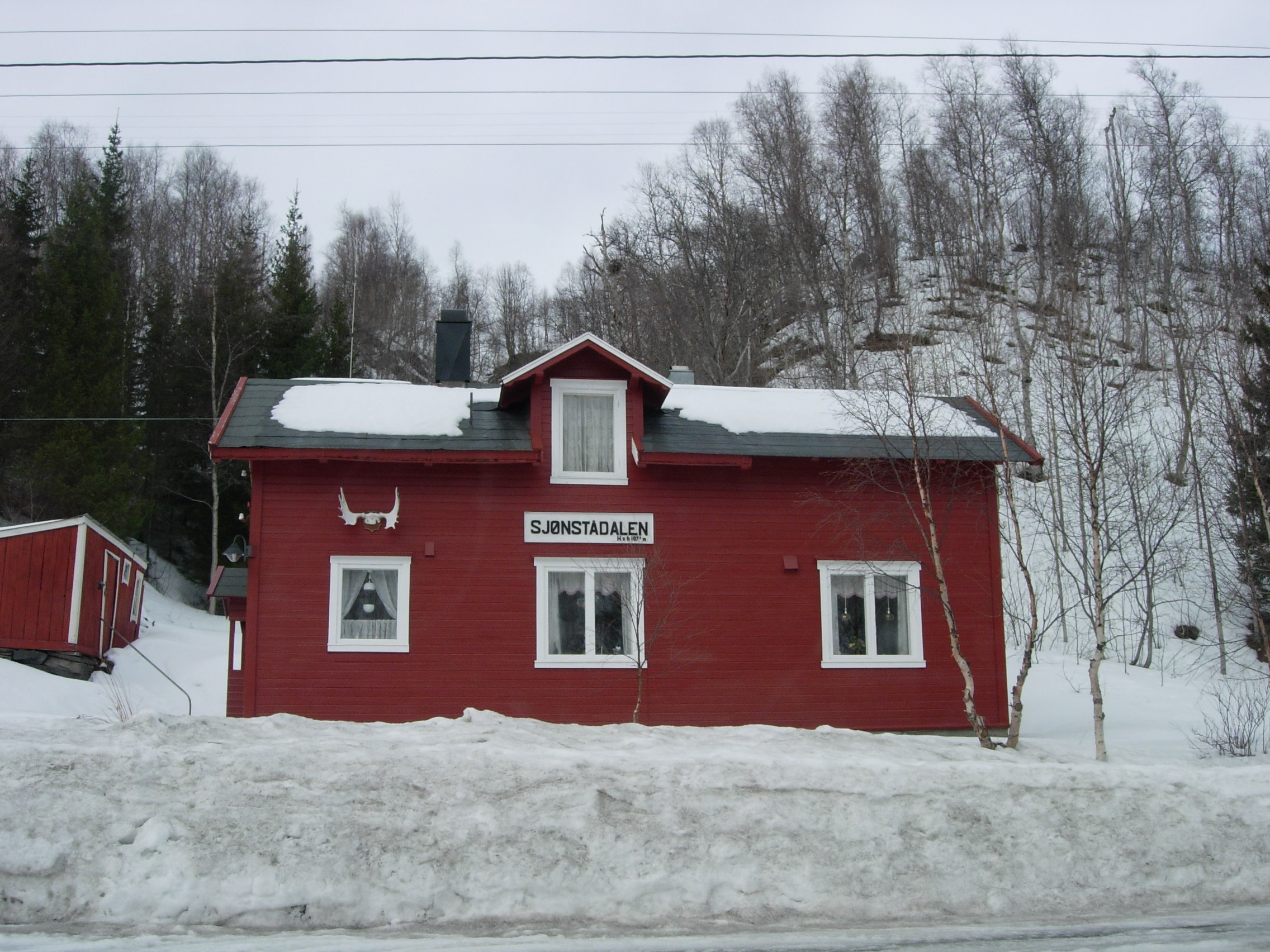
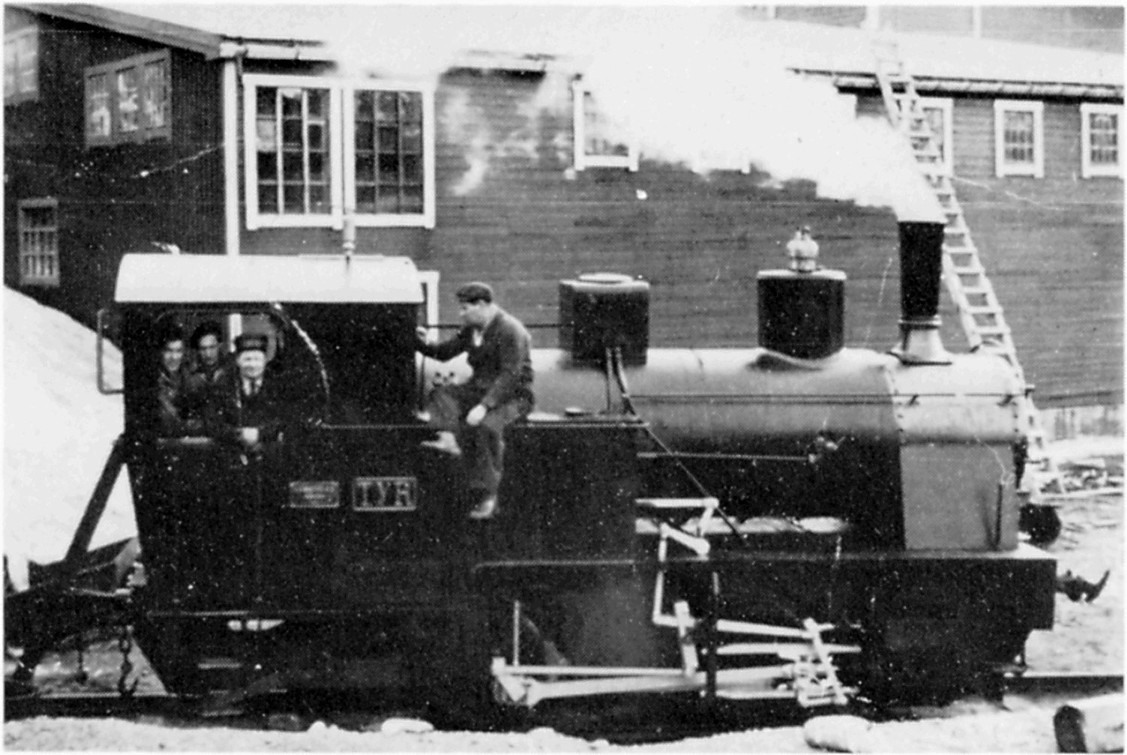
- The former station at Sjønstå Maffei locomotive No 4366 named TYR, 1950

Overview
- Native name: Sulitjelmabanen
- Status: Abandoned
- Owner: Norwegian State Railways
- Termini: Finneid; Fagerli
- Stations: 11

Service
- Type: Railway
- System: Norwegian railway
- Operator(s): Norwegian State Railways

History
- Opened: 1892
- Closed: 1972

Technical
- Line length: 35.8 km (22.2 mi)
- Number of tracks: Single
- Character: Freight and passenger
- Track gauge: 1,067 mm (3 ft 6 in)
- Electrification: No

The Sulitjelma Line (Norwegian: Sulitjelmabanen) was a railway line that ran between Finneid in the town of Fauske to the village of Sulitjelma near the border with Sweden. The railway line was entirely inside Fauske Municipality in Nordland county, Norway. The line was built in 1891, over time it was lengthened until 1958 when it was connected to the Nordland Line (having a different rail gauge) and the sea port at Finneid. It existed as a branch of the Nordland Line from 1958 until 1972 when the line was closed and removed. The railway line followed the path of the present-day Norwegian County Road 830.

== History ==
Construction of the line started in May 1891 when the mining company in Sulitjelma decided to build a railway between Sjønstå and Fossen. Sjønstå is located on the shore of the lake Øvervatnet, close to sea level. The track was immediately extended along the Sjønstå River to Hellarmo the following year. Hellarmo is a small village area that sits on the western edge of the lake Langvatnet higher up the valley, about 13 kilometres (8.1 mi) from Sjønstå. It was the first railway line to be built in Northern Norway. The mining products were transported by barges on the lakes. This was not possible when ice covered the lakes, so in the winter the mining products were stored.

The mine in Sulitjelma was expanded into the mountains at Fagerli in 1912, and at the same time the gauge was increased from 750 mm (2 ft 5 1/2 in) to 1,067 mm (3 ft 6 in). The line also was extended all the way to the mine in Sulitjelma. The official opening of the renovated and extended line was on 15 July 1915.

The track between Sandnes and Fagerli (in the village of Sulitjelma) was removed in 1950. In 1953, work began on extending the line from Sjønstå on the lake Øvrevatnet all the way to Finneid on the coast of the Skjerstad Fjord in the town of Fauske. The new extension would connect the line to the main Nordland Line in Fauske. Three tunnels, Grønnlifjell Tunnel, Hårskolten Tunnel and Sjønståfjell Tunnel, each with a length of 2,400 to 2,800 metres (7,900 to 9,200 ft) were built. The reason was that the lake barge transport had difficulties in the winter. Operation of the line all the way to Finneid started in December 1956. Another new tunnel through the small Stokkviknakken mountain was opened on 30 November 1962. After this, the railway had a total length of 35.8 kilometres (22.2 mi).

The line closed on 22 July 1972 and it was rebuilt, including the tunnels, as Norwegian County Road 830. This work was completed in 1975.

== Stations ==
- Finneid
- Solvik
- Sjønstå
- Ågifjellet
- Tveråmo
- Fossen
- Hellarmo
- Sulitjelma
- Langvatnet
- Sandnes (Lomi)
- Fagerli (until 1950)

== See also ==
- List of gauge conversions
