= Langvatnet (Fauske) =

Lake in Fauske, Norway

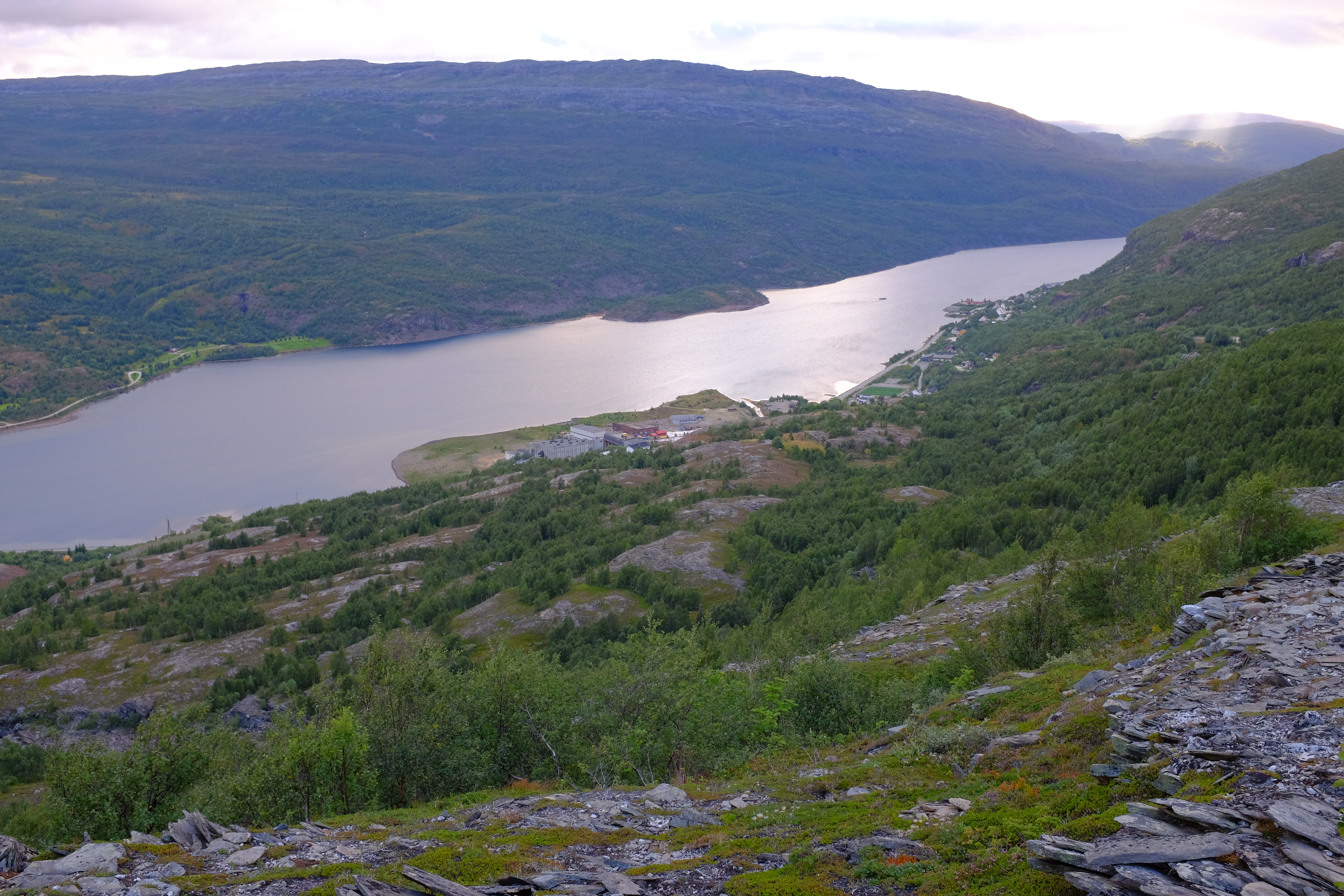
- Langvatnet in 2016
- Interactive map of the lake
- Location: Fauske Municipality, Nordland
- Coordinates: 67.1376°N 16.0240°E
- Type: glacier lake and dammed reservoir
- Basin countries: Norway
- Max. length: 10.3 km (6.4 mi)
- Max. width: 0.7 km (0.43 mi)
- Surface area: 5.46 km^{2} (2.11 sq mi)
- Max. depth: 93 m (305 ft)
- Shore length^{1}: 25.82 km (16.04 mi)
- Surface elevation: 127 m (417 ft)
- References: NVE
- ^{1} Shore length is not a well-defined measure.

Langvatnet (lit. 'Long Lake') is a lake that lies in Fauske Municipality in Nordland county, Norway. The 5.46-square-kilometre (2.11 sq mi) lake lies about 25 kilometres (16 mi) east of the town of Fauske. The village of Sulitjelma lies on the northeastern edge of the lake. Water from the lakes Kjelvatnet and Låmivatnet flow into the lake from the south and east. The water from Langvatnet flows out through the Sjønstå River to the west towards the lake Øvrevatnet.

== See also ==
- List of lakes in Norway
- Geography of Norway
