= Øvervatnet =

Large lake in Fauske, Norway

- Øvrevatnet
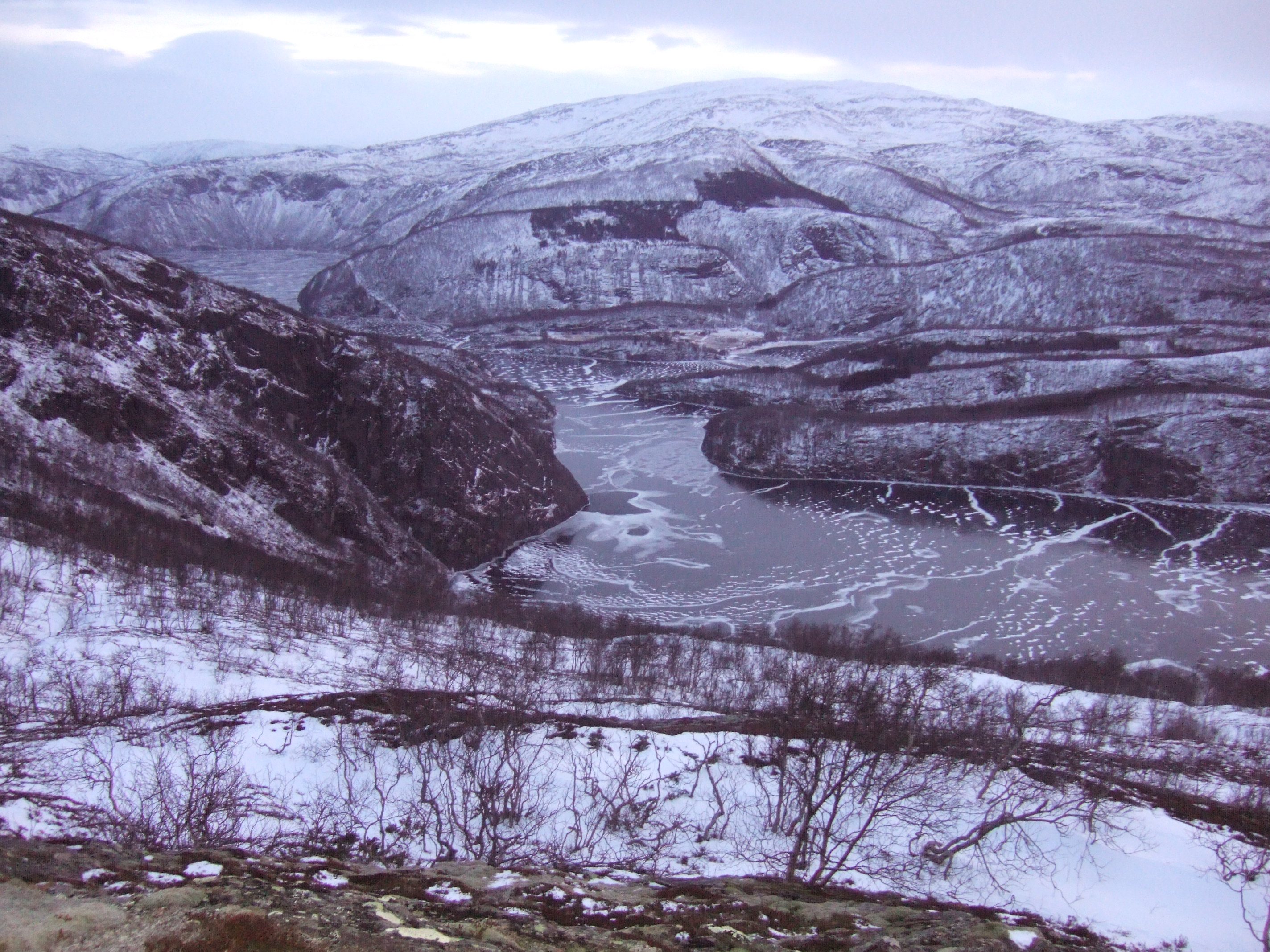
- Interactive map of the lake
- Location: Fauske Municipality, Nordland
- Coordinates: 67.22°N 15.66°E
- Type: meromictic glacial lake
- Primary inflows: Høggedalselva, Laksåga, Sjønståelva, Stigåga, Storvikelva, Støytåga and Sveåga
- Primary outflows: Hjemgamstraumen
- Catchment area: 998 km^{2} (385 sq mi)
- Basin countries: Norway
- Max. length: 11.8 km (7.3 mi)
- Max. width: 2 km (1.2 mi)
- Surface area: 11 km^{2} (4.2 sq mi)
- Max. depth: 346 m (1,135 ft)
- Shore length^{1}: 33.11 km (20.57 mi)
- Surface elevation: 1 m (3.3 ft)
- References: NVE
- ^{1} Shore length is not a well-defined measure.

Øvervatnet is a meromictic lake (containing anoxic seawater at depth of 40 metres (130 ft) and below) located in Fauske Municipality in Nordland county, Norway. The lake is situated about 6 km (3.7 mi) east of the town of Fauske. Its water is fresh down to depths of 10–15 m (33–49 ft). From that level, the water becomes increasingly salty. Øvervatnet is also heavily polluted by mining industry operations upstream in earlier times. The 11-square-kilometre (4.2 sq mi) lake flows out into the neighboring lake Nedrevatnet, to the west.

== See also ==
- List of lakes in Norway
- Geography of Norway
