= Sulitjelma =

Village in Fauske Municipality, Norway

Sulitjelma (Norwegian) Sulisjielmmá (Lule Sami) Sulitelma (Swedish) Historic: Sulečielbma (Lule Sami)
- Village
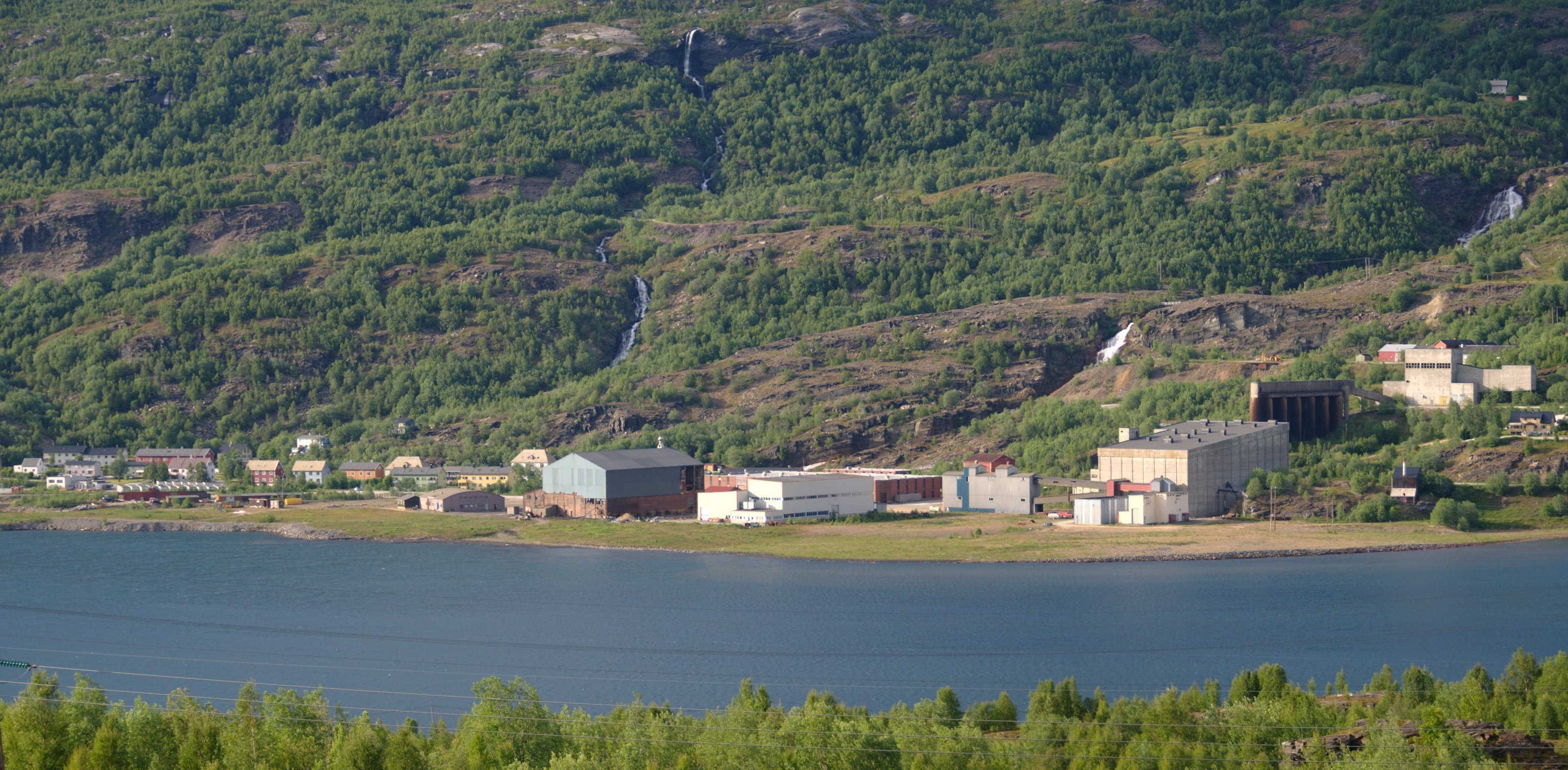
- Early-July 2009 view of the village
- Interactive map of Sulitjelma (Norwegian); Sulisjielmmá (Lule Sami); Sulitelma (Swedish)
- Location within Nordland Location within Norway
- Coordinates: 67.1330°N 16.0766°E
- Country: Norway
- Region: Northern Norway
- County: Nordland
- District: Salten
- Municipality: Fauske Municipality

Area
  - Total: 0.53 km^{2} (0.20 sq mi)
- Elevation: 130 m (430 ft)

Population (2023)
  - Total: 399
  - Density: 753/km^{2} (1,950/sq mi)
- Time zone: UTC+01:00 (CET)
  - Summer (DST): UTC+02:00 (CEST)
- Post Code: 8230 Sulitjelma

Sulitjelma (Norwegian), Sulisjielmmá (Lule Sami), or Sulitelma (Swedish) is a village in Fauske Municipality in Nordland county, Norway. Sulitjelma is situated in a lush inland valley at an elevation of 140 metres (460 ft) above sea level. It is located on the shore of Langvatnet lake, about 35 kilometres (22 mi) southeast of the town of Fauske. The lakes Lomivatnet, Kjelvatnet, and Muorkkejávrre are located to the east and south of the village.

The 0.53-square-kilometre (130-acre) village has a population (2023) of 399 and a population density of 753 inhabitants per square kilometre (1,950/sq mi).

Sultitjelma is virtually surrounded by mountains and glaciers. Sulitjelma Glacier and mountain are located about 10 km west from the town. The town is also at the southern terminus of the Nordkalottruta hiking trail. There is a road connection to the town of Fauske, which is located 44 kilometres (27 mi) west. Winters in Sulitjelma have reliable snow cover and are on average 2 °C (3.6 °F) colder than in the town of Fauske. The village is the birthplace of academic Geir Lundestad. Sulitjelma Church and Sulitjelma Chapel are both located in the village. There are many old mines in the area.

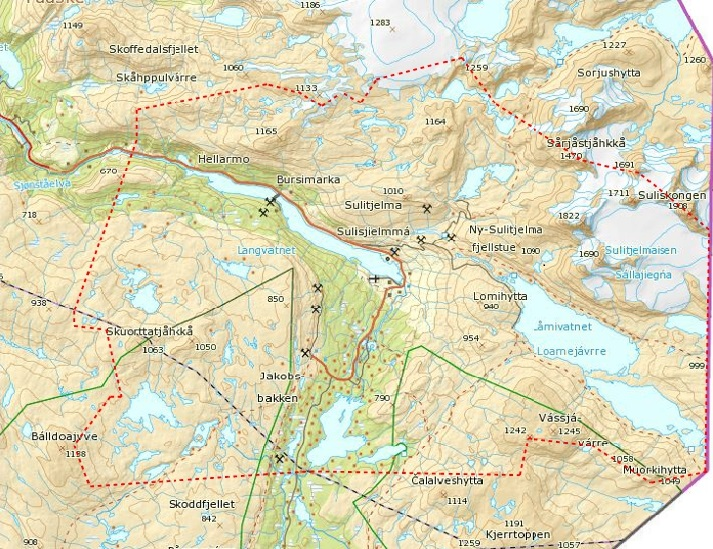
Map of mines in Sulitjelma

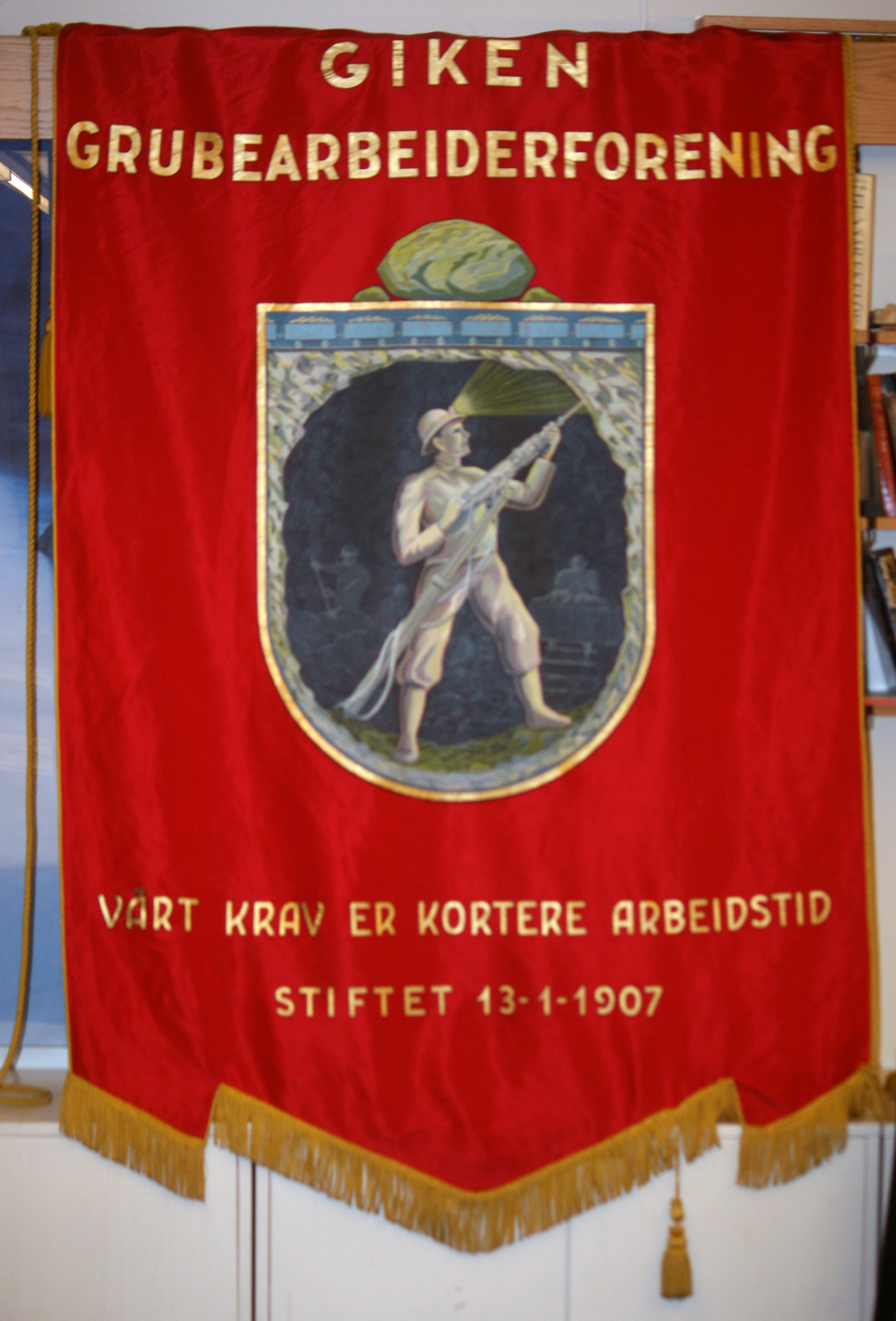
Banner for Sulitjelma Labourers

== History ==
Archaeological finds of human occupation in the area date back more than a thousand years. The village originated as a Sámi settlement, who bred reindeer during summers through the end of the 16th century. Around 1848, the first Norwegians moved into the area to clear farms and to settle. In 1858, Mons Andreas Petersen (1829–1886) sent ore samples to Venset. This led to additional research which resulted in confirmed copper and sulfur deposits in the area.

=== Mining ===
In 1887, the Swedish industrialist and entrepreneur Nils Persson (1836–1916) bought the mineral rights to those findings and the mining era began.

Sulitjelma Gruber was founded in 1891 as a Norwegian limited company to mine the area's minerals. In addition to the mines themselves, there was also a plant for processing the ore, a smelting plant, a conveying plant, as well as all the other necessary service institutions needed to support the growing population of the community. By the early 20th century, it was the largest mining company in the country—and the second largest Norwegian industrial company. At its peak in 1913, the company had 1,750 employees.

Over time it became necessary to go deeper into the mountain to reach the ore. This increased the cost of the operations. When the mining license expired in 1983, the state took over the operation under the name of Sulitjelma Bergverk A/S. In 1991, all mining in Sulitjelma was stopped as the costs of extraction became greater than the value of the ore on the market. The remaining ore deposits still constitute the largest known deposit of copper in Norway.

The construction of the Sulitjelma Line railway began in May 1891 when the mining company in Sulitjelma decided to build a railway between the villages of Sjønstå and Fossen. The line was the first in Northern Norway. The expansion of the mine into the mountains at Fagerli began in 1912, and at the same time the railway gauge was increased from 750 millimetres (30 in) to 1,067 millimetres (42.0 in). The railroad line was closed on 22 July 1972. The tracks were removed and the former trackbed was converted into a roadway. Norwegian County Road 830 opened to traffic in 1975.
