= Finneid =

Finneid: Finneid (Norwegian); Finnájdde (Lule Sami)
- Neighborhood in Fauske
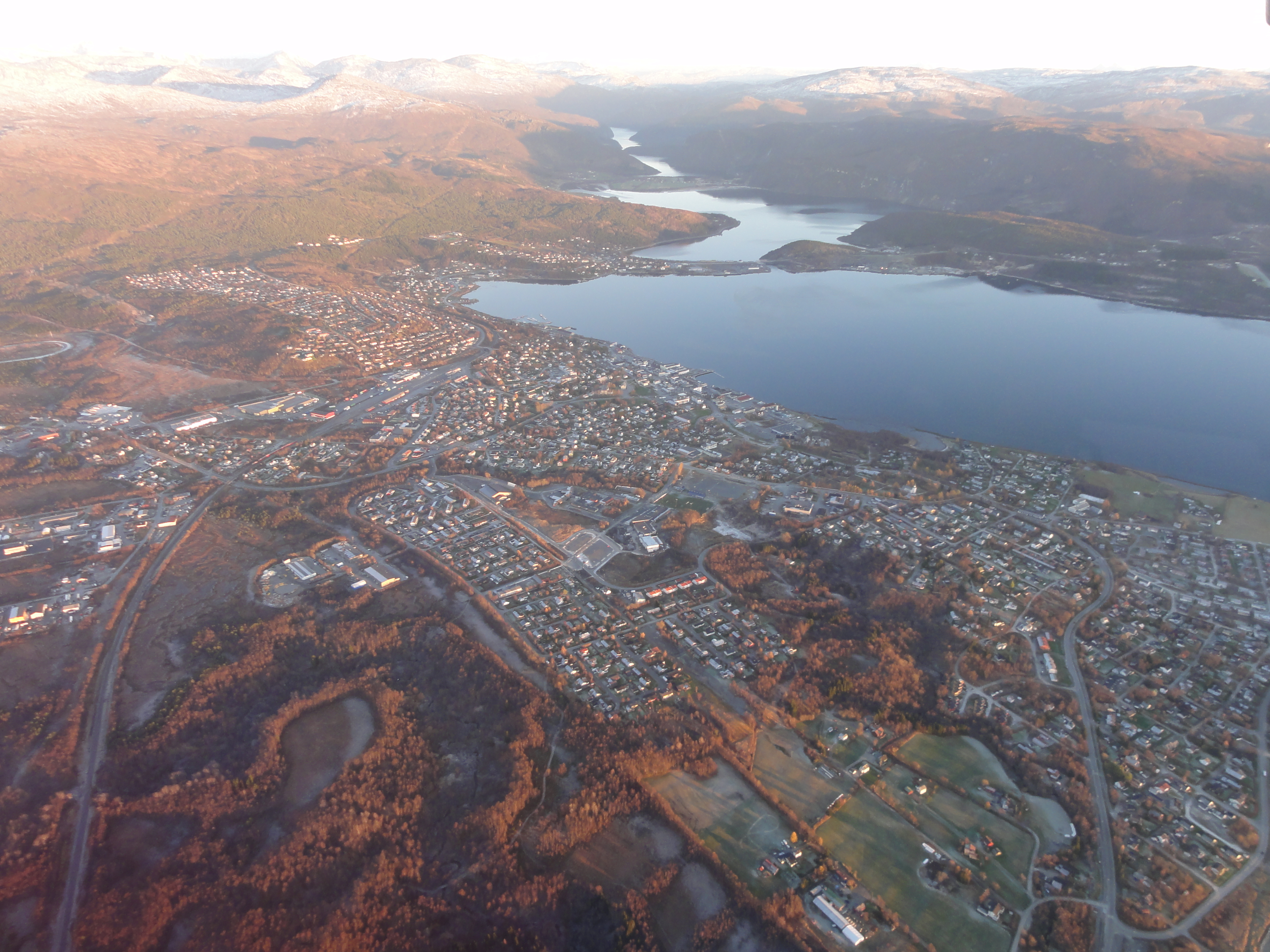
- Fauske with Finneid at top center
- Interactive map of Finneid
- Location within Nordland Location within Norway
- Coordinates: 67°15′17.611″N 15°26′25.534″E
- Country: Norway
- Region: Northern Norway
- County: Nordland
- District: Salten
- Municipality: Fauske Municipality
- Elevation: 26 m (85 ft)
- Time zone: UTC+01:00 (CET)
  - Summer (DST): UTC+02:00 (CEST)
- Post Code: 8200 Fauske

Finneid is a neighborhood in the eastern part of the town of Fauske, located within Fauske Municipality in Nordland county, Norway. The area had a population of 210 (2016 census). The area is located along the Fauskevika bay on the Skjerstadfjorden. The lake Nervatnet empties into the fjord just south of Finneid.

Historically, Finneid was a separate village, but it has grown together with the neighboring town of Fauske due to conurbation. Finneid was the main port for shipping out the ore that came from the mine in Sulitjelma. The area formerly had hotels, boarding houses, and shops, but as mining in Sulitjelma declined most of the businesses established in Finneid closed down.

Finneid is connected to the centre of the town of Fauske by the European route E6 highway and to the village of Sulitjelma by Norwegian County Road 830. The Nordlandsbanen railway line runs through Finneid as well.
