= Northern Norway =

Region of Norway

Coordinates: 69°40′N 19°0′E

Northern Norway Nord-Norge (Bokmål) Nord-Noreg (Nynorsk) Davvi-Norga (Northern Sami)
- Region (landsdel)
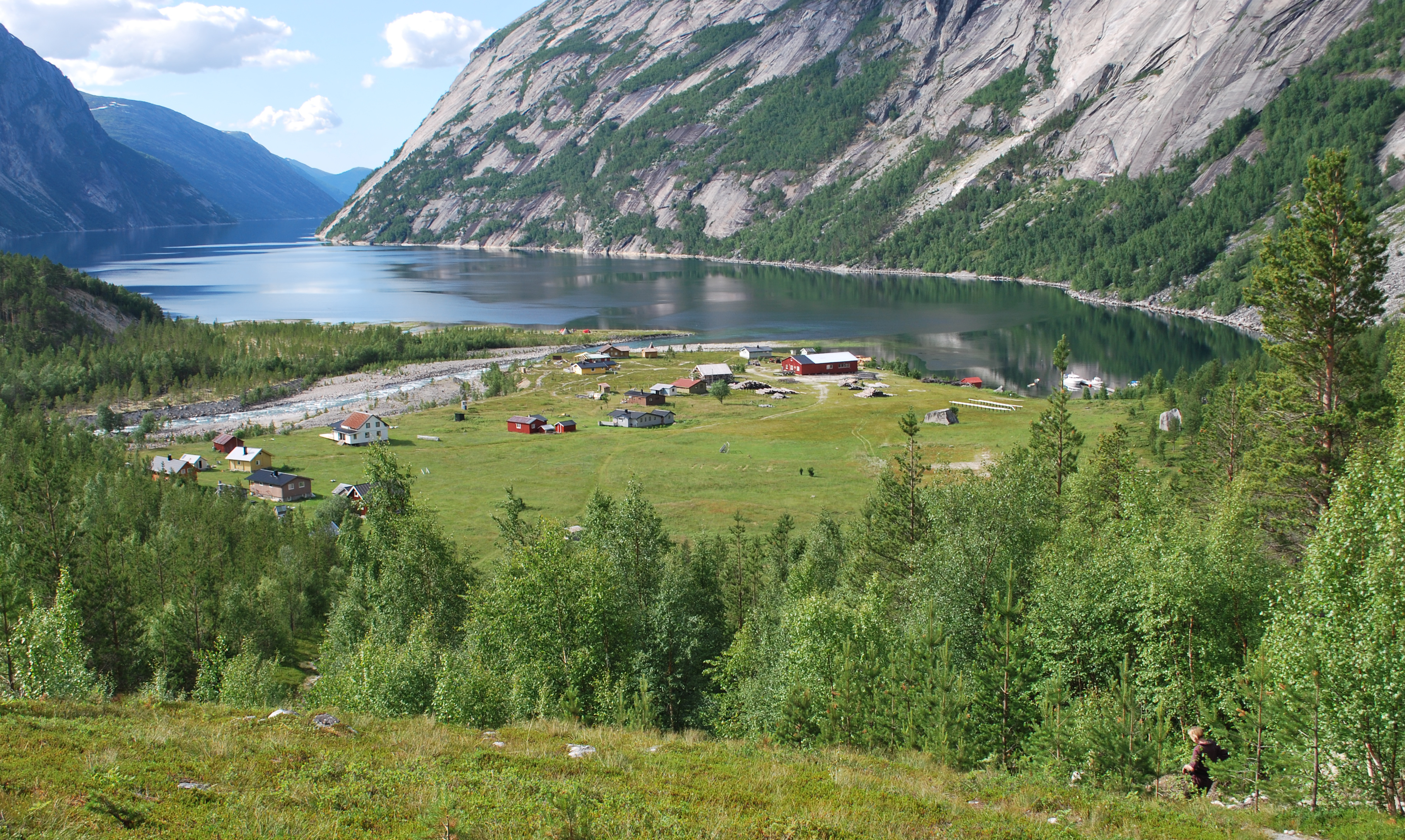
- Hellmobotn in Hamarøy where Norway is at its narrowest.

- Country: Norway
- Capitals: Tromsø, Bodø, Vadsø
- Counties (fylker, fylke): Nordland; Troms; Finnmark

Area
  - Total: 112,951 km^{2} (43,611 sq mi)

Population (2020)
  - Total: 482,000
  - Density: 4.27/km^{2} (11.1/sq mi)
- Demonym(s): Nord-norsk (objects), Nording (people)
- Nominal GDP (2013): $27 billion
- Nominal GDP per capita (2013): $58,000

Northern Norway (Bokmål: Nord-Norge, Urban East Norwegian: [ˈnûːrˌnɔrɡə], Nynorsk: Nord-Noreg; Northern Sami: Davvi-Norga) is a geographical region of Norway, consisting of the three northernmost counties Nordland, Troms and Finnmark, in total about 35% of the Norwegian mainland. Some of the largest towns in Northern Norway (from south to north) are Mo i Rana, Bodø, Narvik, Harstad, Tromsø and Alta. Northern Norway is often described as the land of the midnight sun and the land of the northern lights. Farther north, halfway to the North Pole, is the Arctic archipelago of Svalbard, traditionally not regarded as part of Northern Norway.

The region is multi-cultural, housing not just Norwegians but also the indigenous Sami people, Norwegian Finns (known as Kvens, distinct from the "Forest Finns" of Southern Norway) and Russian populations (mostly in Kirkenes). The Norwegian language dominates in most of the area; Sami speakers are mainly found inland and in some of the fjord areas of Nordland, Troms and particularly Finnmark – though ethnic Sámi who do not speak the language are found more or less everywhere in the region. Finnish is spoken in only a few communities in the east of Finnmark.

== Geography ==
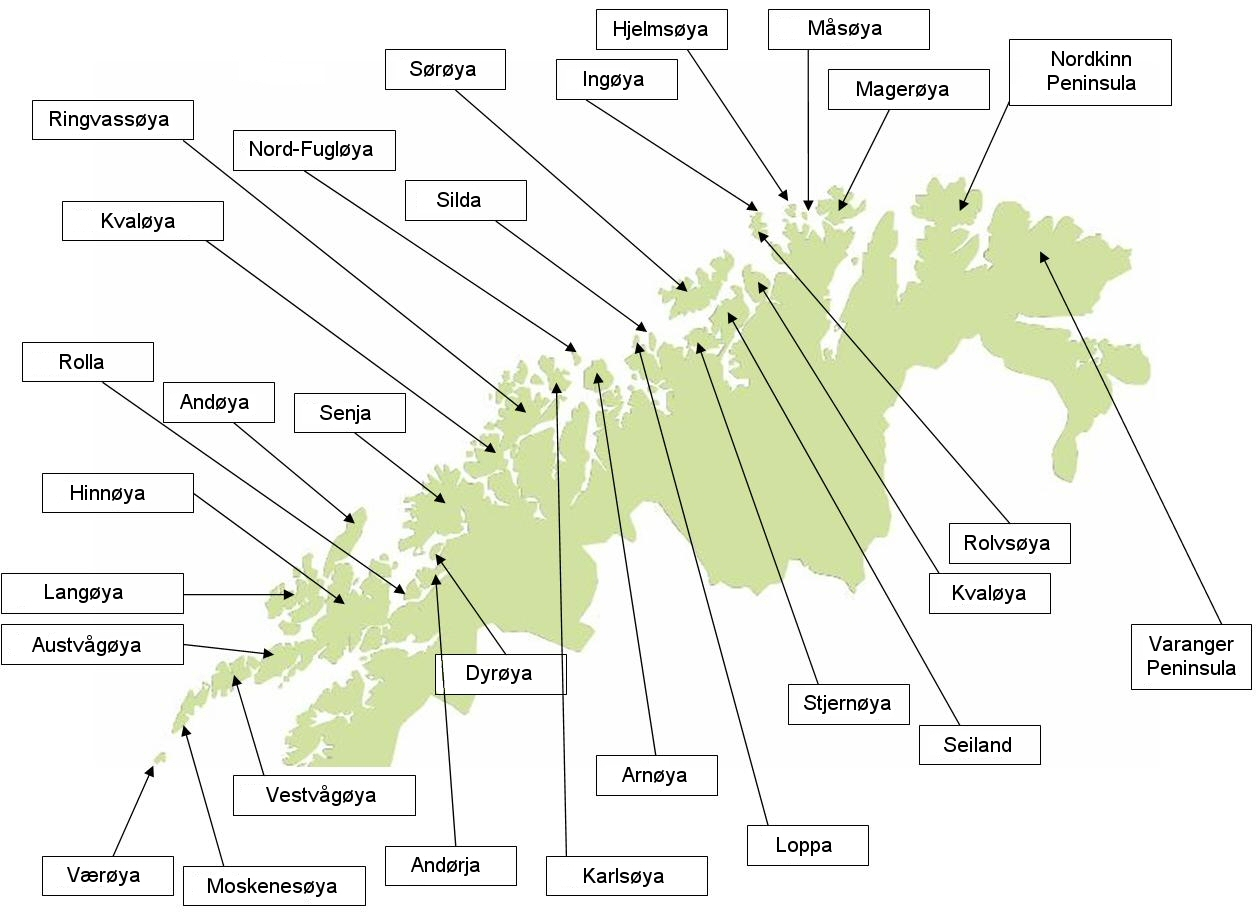
Some of the major islands in Northern Norway

Northern Norway covers about a third of Norway. The southernmost part, roughly the part south of the Arctic Circle, is called Helgeland. Here there is a multitude of islands and skerries on the outside of the coastal range, some flat, some with impressive shapes, like Mount Torghatten, which has a hole through it, and the Seven Sisters near Sandnessjøen. The inland is covered with dense spruce forests and mountains near the Swedish border; some of the biggest rivers in the region are the Vefsna and the Ranelva. The highest mountain in Northern Norway is found here in the Okstindan range south of Mo i Rana with Oksskolten reaching 1,915 metres (6,283 ft) above sea level, and with the glacier Okstindbreen.

The Saltfjellet range, with its Svartisen glacier and intersecting Arctic Circle, divides Helgeland from the next region, called Salten. Notable peaks in Salten are the Børvasstindan south of Bodø, Suliskongen near Fauske (1,907 metres or 6,257 feet, highest mountain north of the Arctic Circle), the Steigartindan and the phallic Hamarøytinden. Between Saltfjellet and eastern Finnmark, Norway spruce trees have originally been planted and are mostly privately owned. The older plantations are now producing lumber, 80 years after planted.

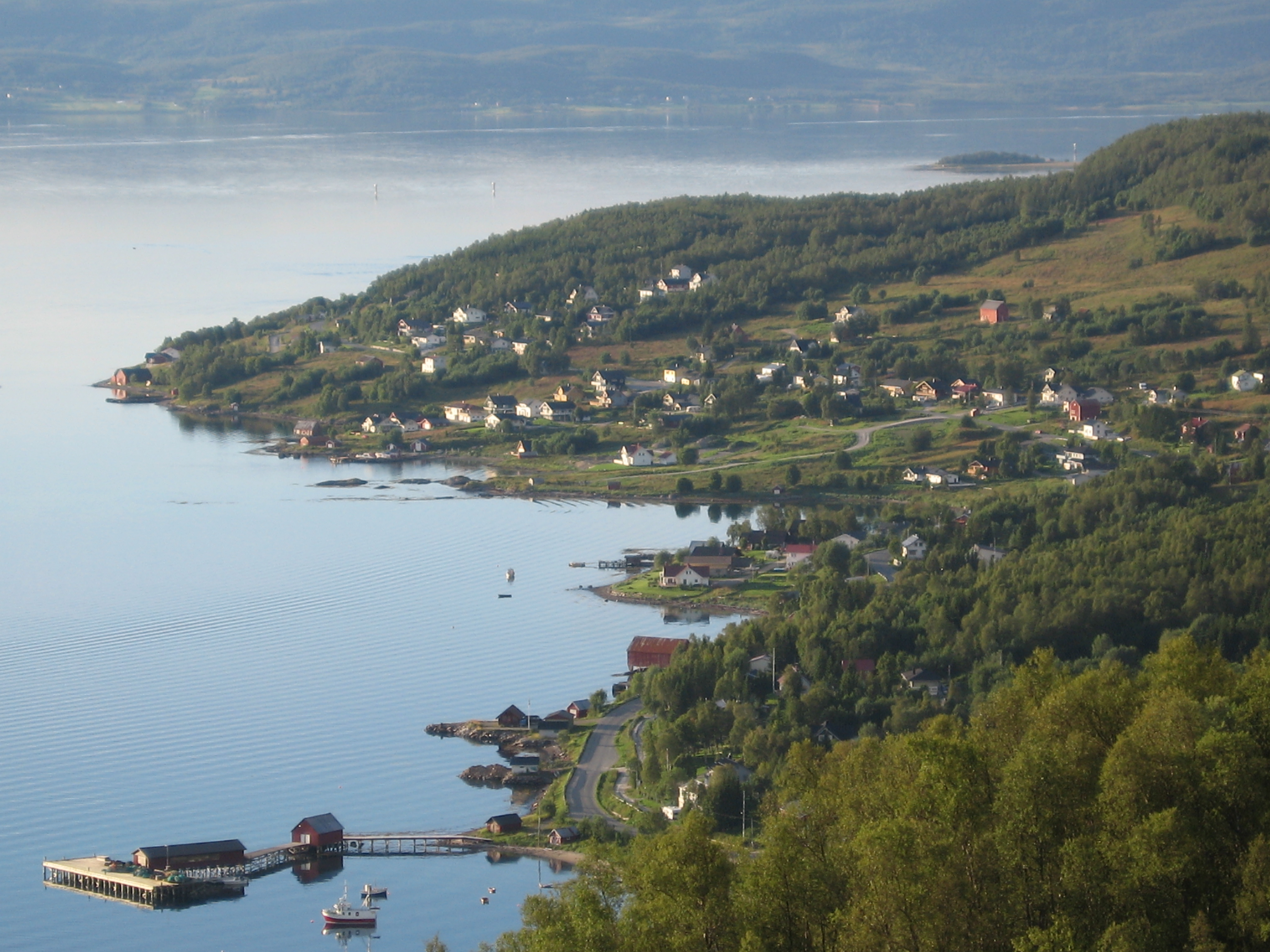
The islands along the coast creates sheltered sounds on the inside, as here at Senja.

Lofoten is a chain of peaks that jut out of the ocean. From the mainland side it looks very barren, but behind the violet-black peaks there are also flatlands with good grazing for sheep, partially on soil made from seaweed. The Vesterålen islands consist of smaller and bigger islands with a huge variation in landscape. Ofoten, further inland, is a fjord landscape with high mountains, the highest is Storsteinfjellet in Narvik, 1,894 m above sea level, but the most well-known is Stetind, the national mountain of Norway. There are also glaciers, like Frostisen and Blåisen.

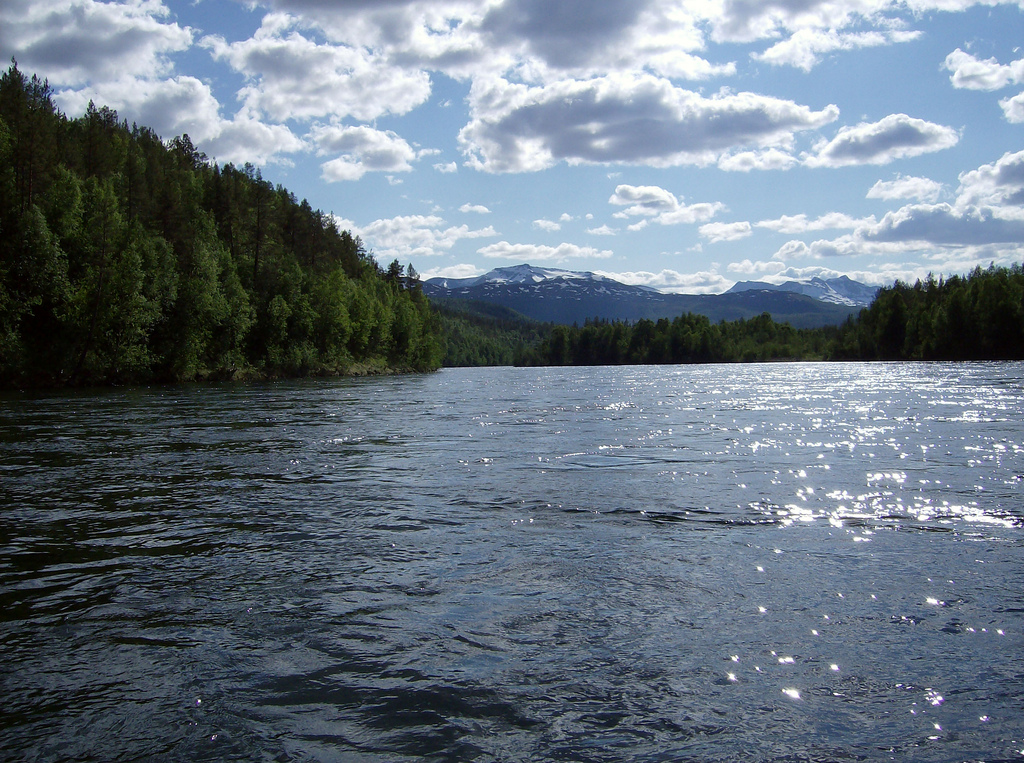
Målselva is one of the larger rivers; Målselv Municipality.

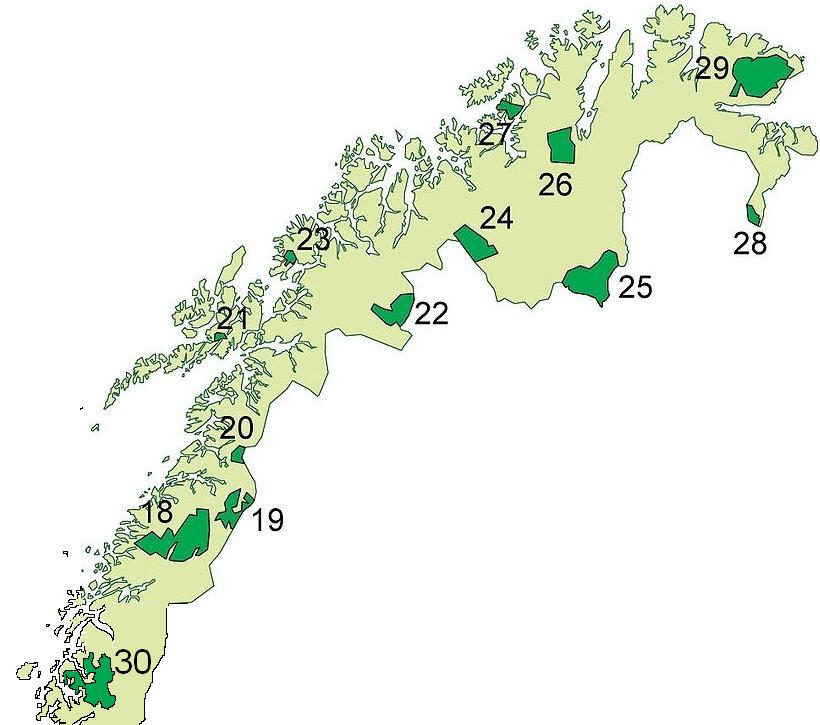
National parks in Northern Norway. Lomsdal-Visten National Park was established May 2009 (no 30). Børgefjell National Park is also partially located in Trøndelag county and does not show up on map.

Troms county has surprising greenery for the latitude, and the inner waterways and fjords are lined with birch forests, and further inland there are extensive pine forests and highlands around the rivers Målselva and Reisaelva. Big islands like Senja, Kvaløya and Ringvassøya have green, forested interiors and a barren, mountainous coastline, with smaller islands offshore. The Lyngen Alps are the highest mountains of the area, rising to 1,833 metres (6,014 ft), an area of glaciers and waterfalls. The 269 metres (883 ft) Mollisfossen waterfall in Nordreisa Municipality is the highest waterfall in the north, while Målselvfossen is Norway's national waterfall.

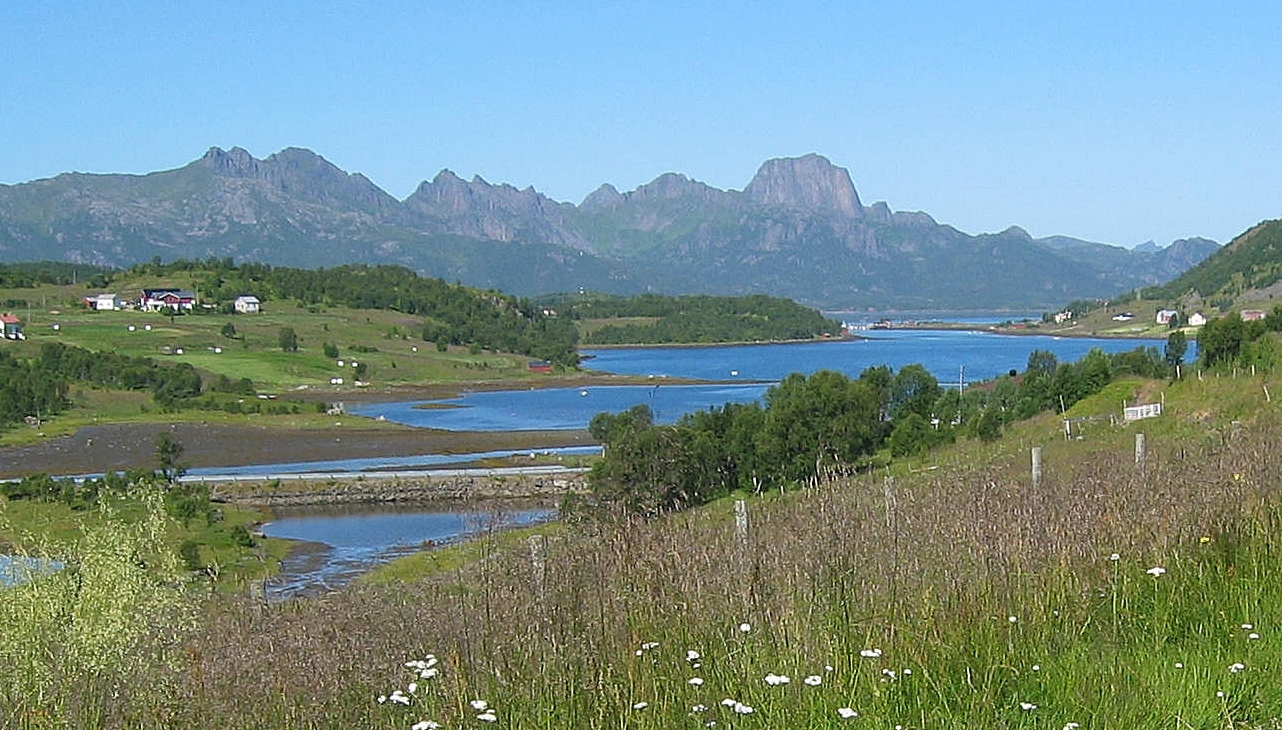
The many fjords vary in size and topography. The bedrock and soil in the surrounding land also varies. Eidsfjorden in Sortland Municipality, Vesterålen.

Finnmark county has fjords and glaciers in the far southwest, and the northwestern coasts are characterized by big islands, like Sørøya and Seiland. The inland is covered by Finnmarksvidda, a relatively barren plateau about 300 to 400 metres (980 to 1,310 ft) high, with many lakes and rivers like Alta-Kautokeino and Tana-Deatnu. Even at this latitude, pine forests grow naturally in lowland areas inland. East of Honningsvåg, there are no islands protecting the barren coasts that rise directly up from the sea. The landscape towards the Russian border is comparatively flat. Knivskjellodden on the island of Magerøya marks the northern end of Europe; tourism is directed to the much more accessible (and dramatic) North Cape, whereas Kinnarodden on the Nordkinn Peninsula is the northernmost point of Europe's mainland. Finnmark is situated north of northernmost Finland, and to the east Norway has a 196 kilometres (122 mi) border with Russia.

== History ==
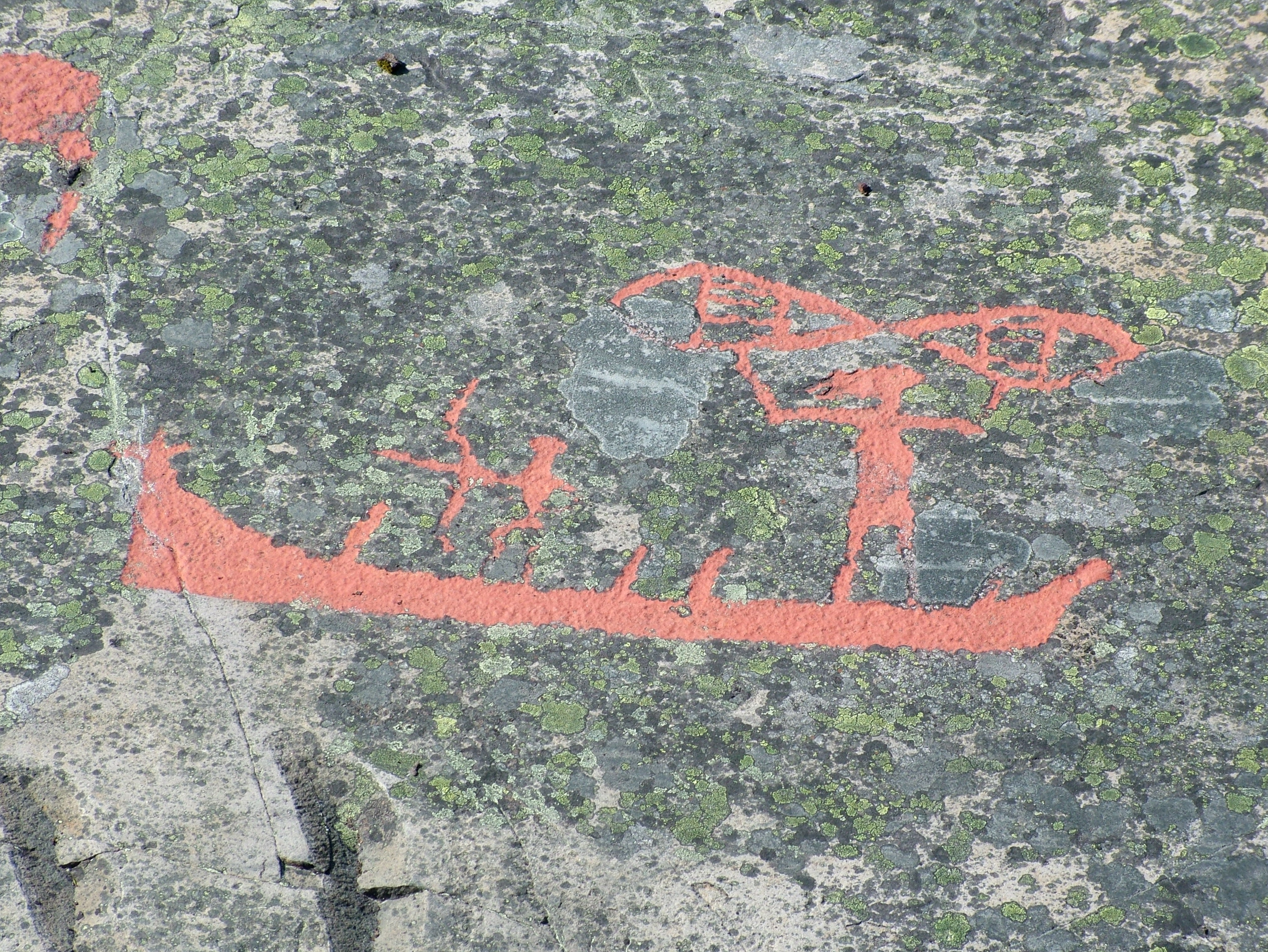
Rock carvings at Alta

Historical population
Year	Pop.	±%
1951	403,884	—
1960	437,182	+8.2%
1970	456,121	+4.3%
1980	468,496	+2.7%
1990	460,274	−1.8%
2000	464,328	+0.9%
2010	464,665	+0.1%
2020	482,000	+3.7%
Source: Statistics Norway .

Religion in Northern Norway
religion	percent
Christianity	89.43%
Islam	0.42%
Buddhism	0.10%
Other	10.05%

The oldest known historical culture in the region is called the Komsa culture, named after a mountain in Alta. The first people possibly arrived 12,000–13,000 years ago, but it is uncertain whether they came from southern Norway or from the Kola Peninsula. Today the rock carvings at Hjemmeluft in Alta or at Leknes in Nordland are among the remainders of the Stone Age cultures, showing reindeer swimming across the fjords. A significant find area is between the river Tana and the fjord of Varanger, where the reindeer probably ran over the isthmus on the way between the winter and summer grazing. The question of the ethnic identity of the Stone Age cultures is politically charged, as many Sami feel the uncertainty surrounding the earliest settlers in Northern Norway is being used to question their status as an indigenous people. Metals were introduced around 500 BC.

The Sami culture can be traced back at least 2,000 years. There is also some archeological evidence of Bronze Age agricultural settlements about 2,500 years old, as in Steigen Municipality and Sømna Municipality. In 2009, archeologist discovered evidence of barley grown in Kvæfjord Municipality (near Harstad) in the Bronze Age 1000 BC. A larger settlement by people of Germanic origin, with substantial archeological evidence, seem to have occurred 200–300 AD. These settled along the coasts roughly up to Tromsø. The two ethnic groups traded with each other, and there seems to have been quite a lot of intermarriage. The nature of the co-existence is hotly debated.

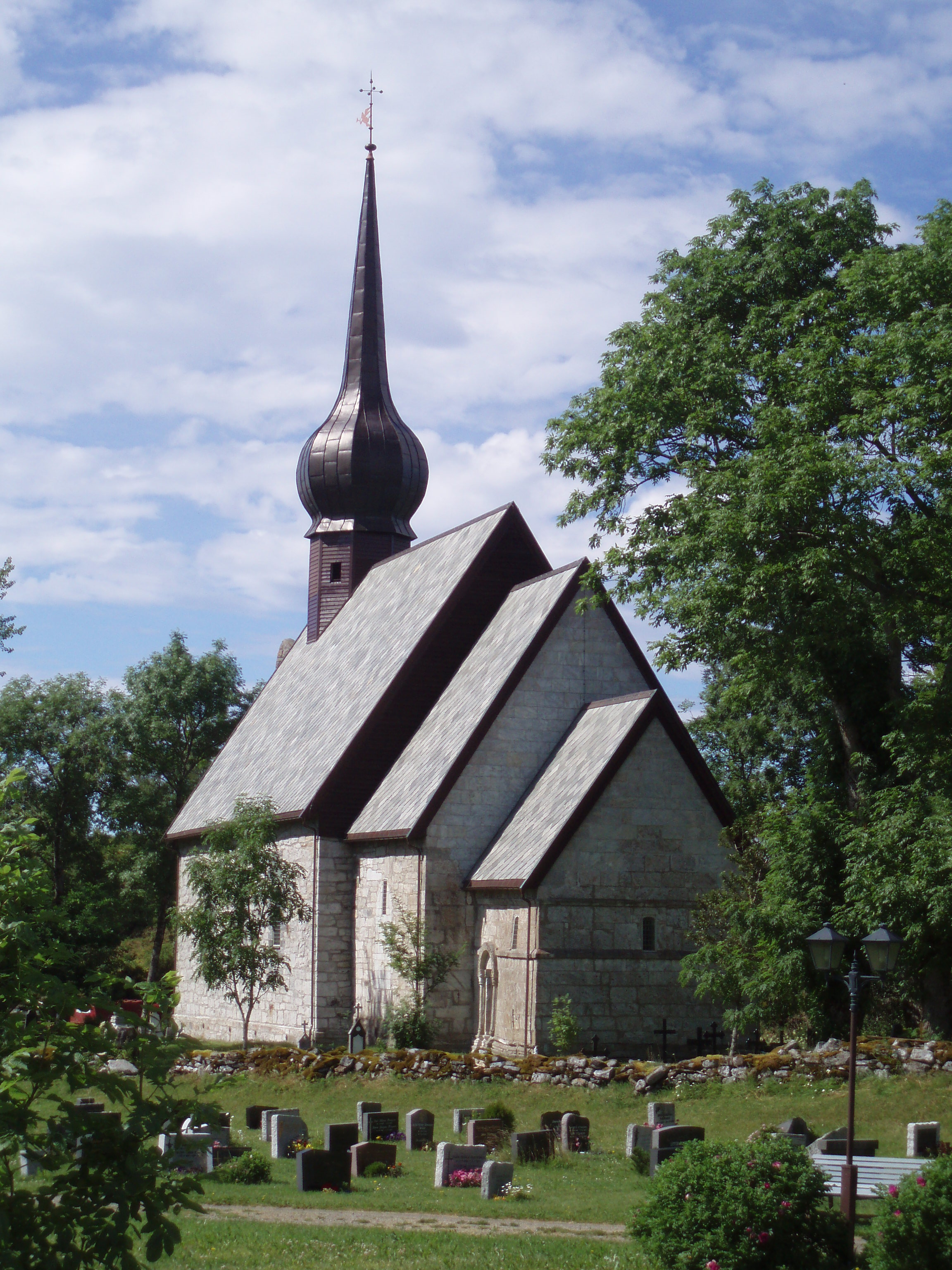
The medieval Alstahaug Church.

In the Viking Age, several chieftains along the coast played a significant role in Norwegian history, usually resisting unification of Norway. The voyage and story of Ottar from Hålogaland was recorded by King Alfred the Great in Wessex. Hårek from Tjøtta and Tore Hund, who killed Saint Olav at the Battle of Stiklestad in 1030 were important leaders according to Heimskringla. The chieftain and poet Øyvind Skaldespiller was the first to receive international acclaim, as his poems were rewarded when the Icelandic parliament organized a money collection to buy him a thick ring of gold. This flourishing period of resistance was followed by consolidation and centralization of the Norwegian state, which was (and is) dominated by southerners (in the relative sense of south of Northern Norway), reducing the power and wealth of the Northern Norwegian chieftains.

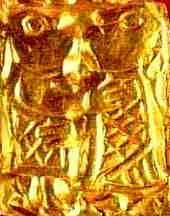
Gullgubber from the Iron Age, the oldest Toreutics in Northern Europe; this one found in Kongsvik in Tjeldsund Municipality, Nordland.

In the Middle Ages, churches and fortifications were built along the coast in an effort to stake a more firm claim for the kingdom of Norway along what was then the frontier of Norwegian settlement. By 1150, Lenvik Church was the northernmost church in Norway. In 1252 the first church, the Ecclesia Sanctae Mariae de Trums juxta paganos ("The Church of Saint Mary in Troms near the Heathens"), was built in Tromsø, along with a small rampart intended to serve as protection against Karelian raids. This was followed in 1307 by the consecration of Vardø Church in what is now eastern Finnmark. Finally, Vardøhus Fortress was constructed to mark and defend the border with the Karelian tributary lands of the Novgorod Republic. The traditional view has been that the fortress and church were constructed at roughly the same time, although recent research indicates that the fortress may have been constructed as late as the 1330s, after the border between Norway and Novgorod had become more fixed. At roughly the same time, the cod fishing gained momentum. Dried cod was exported through Bergen to the whole Hanseatic world, bringing prosperity to the north. This is reflected in the numerous pieces of imported church art from the Late Middle Ages. There were numerous wars with the Novgorod Republic in Russia at the time, that stopped by the late 15th century.

Reduced fish prices in the 17th century and the exploitative trade practices of merchants from Bergen, who had been granted a royal monopoly on fish trading, led to a significant decline in the population and grinding poverty for those who remained. Large coastal areas were depopulated, and Sami culture made a comeback, as it was less dependent on fish exports. After 1700, Russian Pomors started to come every summer on trading expeditions, bringing rye in exchange for fish. Although this was in violation of Bergen's trade monopoly and the Danish–Norwegian monarchy made some attempts to curtail the Pomor trade, the trade was vital to the survival of many Northern Norwegian fishing communities. In the 1740s the first settlers started arriving in Northern Norway from Finland. The traditional view is that these were refugees escaping famine and warfare at home, although modern scholars have pointed out that many were simply looking for their own piece of land, which was getting scarce in Finland as a result of rapid population growth. In 1789, the trade monopoly of the city of Bergen was lifted, Hammerfest and Vardø were issued their city charters, and Tromsø followed suit in 1794. Interrupted by the British blockade of the Napoleonic wars, this introduced a period of unprecedented growth in the north as the trade monopoly had previously made cities nonviable in Northern Norway. Bodø was founded in 1816, and Vadsø in 1833. The Hurtigruten shipping line, introduced in 1893, gave quicker communications with the south. In 1906, the iron mines in Kirkenes opened.

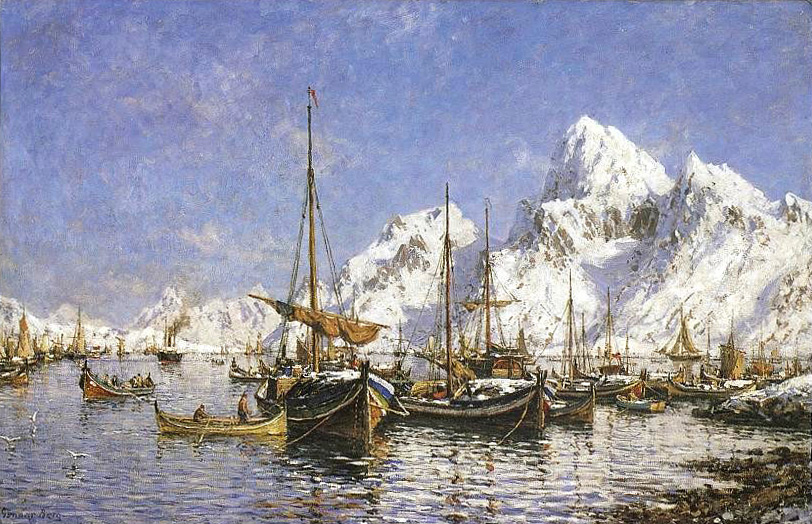
Cod fisheries have for more than 1,000 years been of great economic importance to the region. From Svolvær harbour by Gunnar Berg.

At the same time, the ethnic diversity of the area came under threat. Particularly after Norwegian independence (from the United Kingdoms of Sweden and Norway) in 1905, the Norwegian authorities were insistent that all should speak Norwegian only and schools became active tools of assimilation. The Sami language was banned in schools, churches and in public administration. Concerns about possible Finnish irredentism also led to increasing pressure on Kvens to assimilate. People who wanted to buy state-owned land in Finnmark had to prove they could speak Norwegian before they were allowed to settle.

This region of Norway was the area most affected by World War II. In 1940, the Norwegians and Allied forces fought the German Army to a standstill over the strategic port for iron exports of Narvik, until allied forces and equipment were withdrawn, leaving the remaining Norwegians with no option but surrender. King Haakon VII and the government fled towards the north, and stayed in the Tromsø area for three weeks. On 27 May, Bodø was bombed by the Luftwaffe, and on 7 June, the Allies retreated from the North, and the King and government fled to Britain from Tromsø. During the war, the area was used by the Kriegsmarine to stage U-boat attacks on Allied Arctic supply convoys resupplying the Eastern Front.

In 1944, the German Wehrmacht started to retreat from the Murmansk front. They burned everything after them in the area between the Russian border and the Lyngen fjord, as part of their tactics. The population was forcibly evacuated, although a third of them chose to hide in the wilderness instead. All who were found were shot.

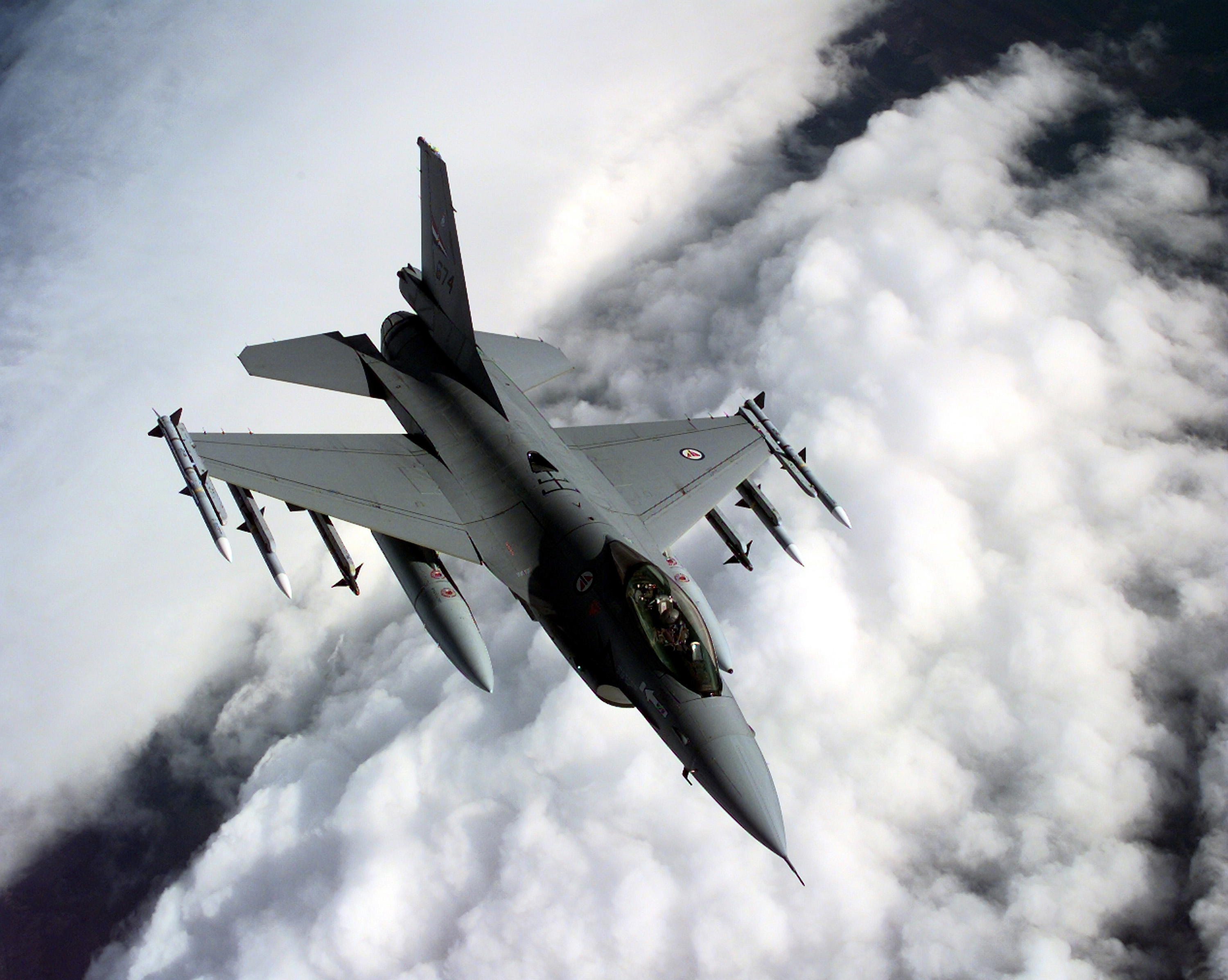
Bodø was an important air base during the Cold War. In more recent years, Norwegian F-16s have deployed to Balkans and Afghanistan.

After World War II, Norway made a huge effort to rebuild the destroyed towns and villages. Modernizing fishing and agriculture was important, as Northern Norway was considerably poorer and less developed than the south. In 1946, the huge steel works of Mo i Rana were founded, heralding industrialization of the north.

Transportation was also improved, as airports were built throughout the area, notably in Bodø in 1952 and Tromsø in 1964. The rail network was extended to reach Bodø in 1961. In 1972, the University of Tromsø opened, accompanied by a number of university colleges, notably in Bodø, Alta, Harstad and Narvik. In 1972 and 1994, the strong anti-EU movements of the north, largely based on concerns over EU mismanagement of its own fish stocks, were instrumental when Norway voted against EU membership in referendums.

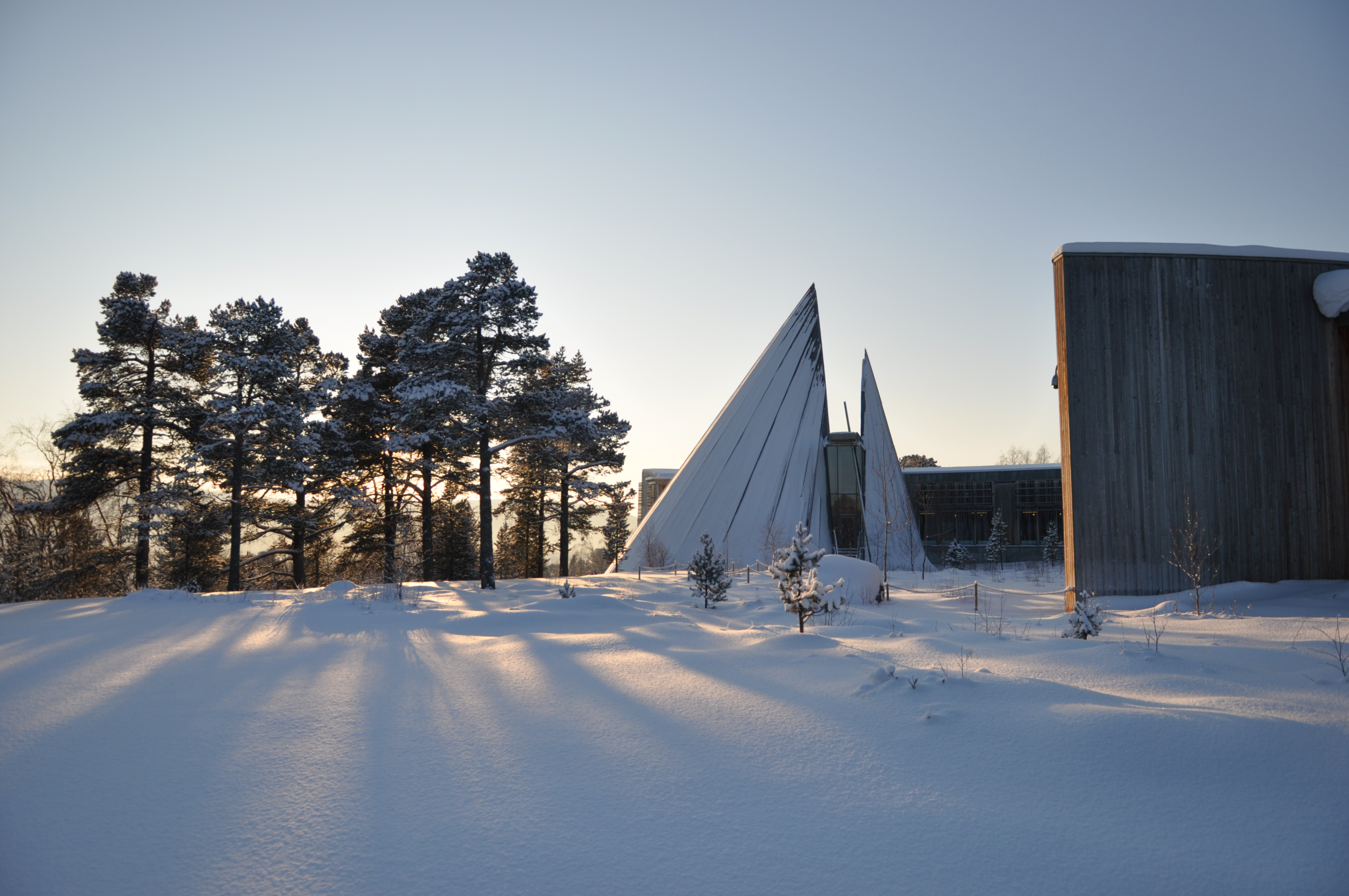
Samediggi – the Sami Parliament in Karasjok.

Sami language instruction was introduced in schools in the 1970s. In 1979, the building of a hydro-electric dam in Alta caused huge demonstrations, giving the Sami question national attention for virtually the first time. The result was a significant effort by the authorities to promote Sami language and culture. In 1989, the Norwegian Sami parliament, Samediggi, opened, and the Law of Finnmark of 2005 was an attempt to deal with the question of land rights. A similar law is on the way for Nordland and Troms.

Working against all this, emigration to the south has been strong after World War II. While there is a slight overall population growth in Northern Norway (as a result of surplus childbirths and immigration from abroad), this is significantly lower than in southern counties, although the regional centres of Bodø, Tromsø and Alta continue to grow at a relatively brisk pace. Lately, the off-shore gas field of Snøhvit, off Hammerfest, has brought hopes of new development in the north.

== Languages ==
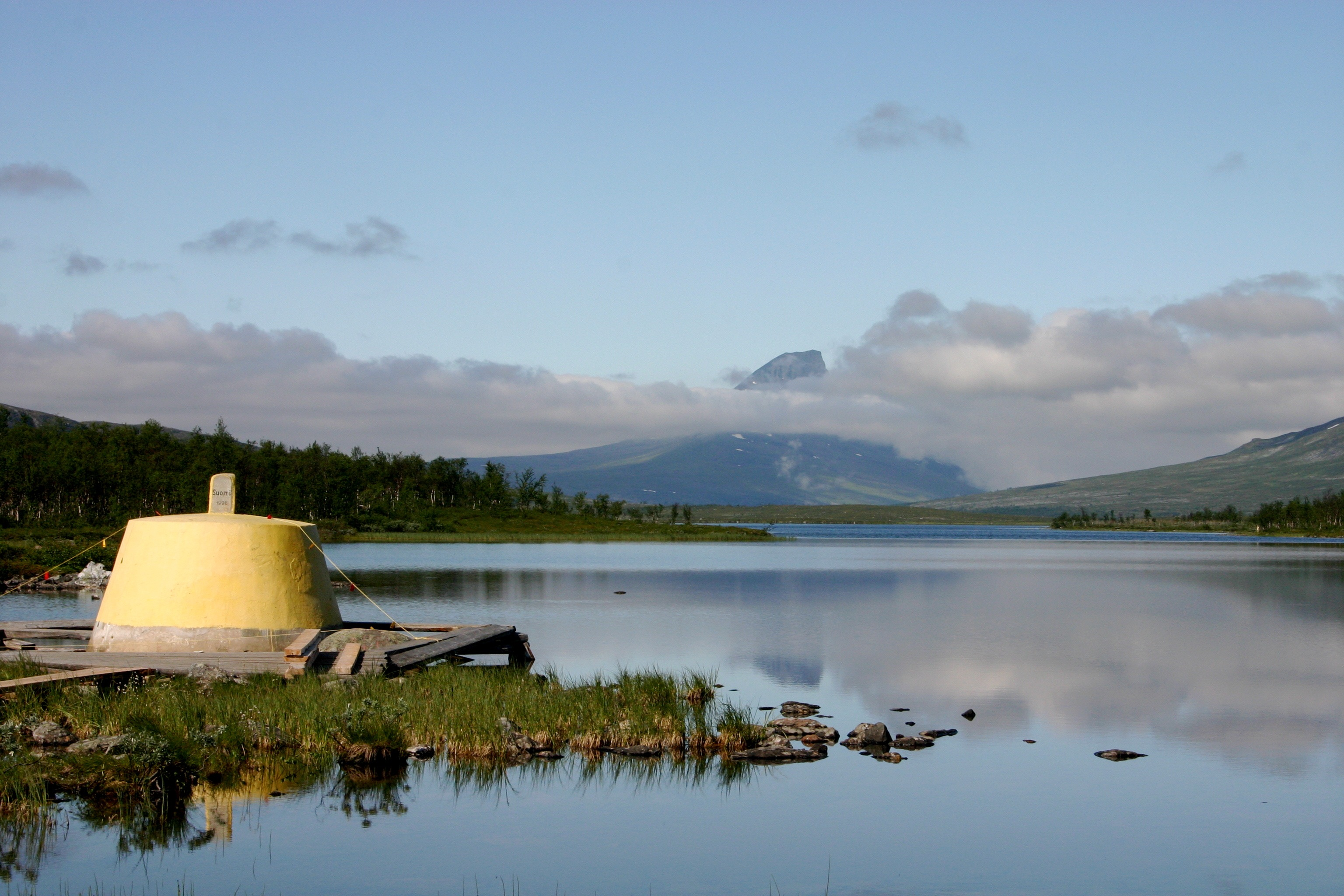
Treriksrøysa where Norway, Sweden and Finland meet each other.

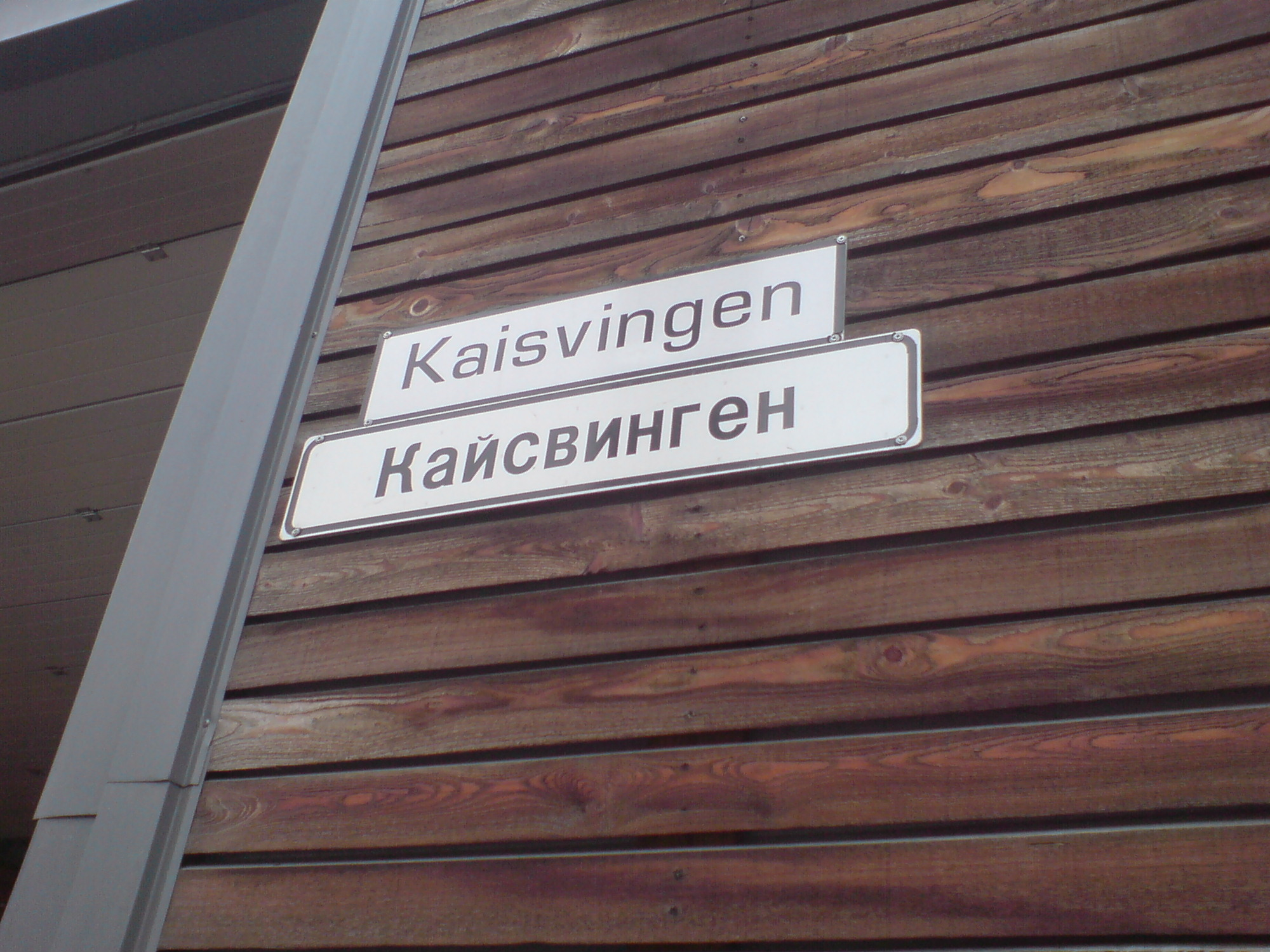
Russian immigration and travel to Kirkenes has prompted the need for street names in Russian.

The Northern Norwegian dialects share a common, musical intonation, different from the southern dialects of Norway. Apart from this, there is great variation in sound system, grammar, and vocabulary. In general, one can say that the southernmost of the northern dialects, particularly in Helgeland and Salten, are the most distinct. Notably they cut grammar endings (like French relative to Italian). In areas of Finnmark, the dialects are somewhat more in line with standard written Norwegian (Bokmål, Nynorsk), particularly in those areas where Norwegian was primarily introduced by the school system as part of the assimilation process during the 20th century. In some inland valleys in the county of Troms, settlers from the inland of Southern Norway immigrated 200 years ago. Even today, these dialects have southern characteristics in intonation and vocabulary.

Earlier, northern dialects had a low status in Norway, but recently they have been used extensively in song lyrics, poetry, in TV and radio. Today, anyone can use their dialects. This is not to suggest that no prejudices remain, however.

Sami is spoken in three main dialects (or languages, depending on the definition): Southern Sami south of the Arctic Circle, Lule Sami mainly between Bodø and Narvik, and Northern Sami in the rest. Originally, Pite Sami and Ume Sami were spoken around Bodø, but these dialects are now extinct on the Norwegian side of the border. Eastern Sami was originally spoken in Neiden, close to Kirkenes, but it is more or less extinct. Overall, Northern Sami is by far the healthiest of the Sami languages today, primarily because it still has a relatively large number of first language speakers and maintains its dominance in core areas in Finnmark. Northern Sami is an official language (in addition to Norwegian) in the municipalities of Gáivuotna Municipality (Kåfjord), Kautokeino Municipality, Karasjok Municipality, Porsanger Municipality, Tana Municipality, and Nesseby Municipality.

The Finnish spoken in western regions, from Storfjord Municipality to Porsanger Municipality, is quite distinct, although comprehensible for people from Finland. Further east, around Vadsø and Kirkenes, the spoken Finnish resembles standard Finnish. People of Finnish descent in these eastern areas are also typically more likely to consider themselves as "Finnish Norwegians" rather than Kvens, arguing that the term Kven represents an attempt to cut them off from their Finnish roots. Finnish is official in addition to Sami and Norwegian in Porsanger municipality. Very few first language Finnish speakers remain in Northern Norway, and unlike Northern Sami, the Finnish language lacks a core region where it is still dominant in daily life.

Coastal and fjord areas of Northern Norway have much in common with Western Norway, sometimes imagined in cultural terms as a shared "coastal identity". The topography and fjord landscape, the rich fisheries, the culture and even some aspects of the dialects (Vestnorsk) have clear similarities.

During the 18th and 19th centuries a Russian-Norwegian pidgin known as Russenorsk developed for the communication of Russian traders and Norwegian fishermen in the Pomor trade.

== Cuisine ==
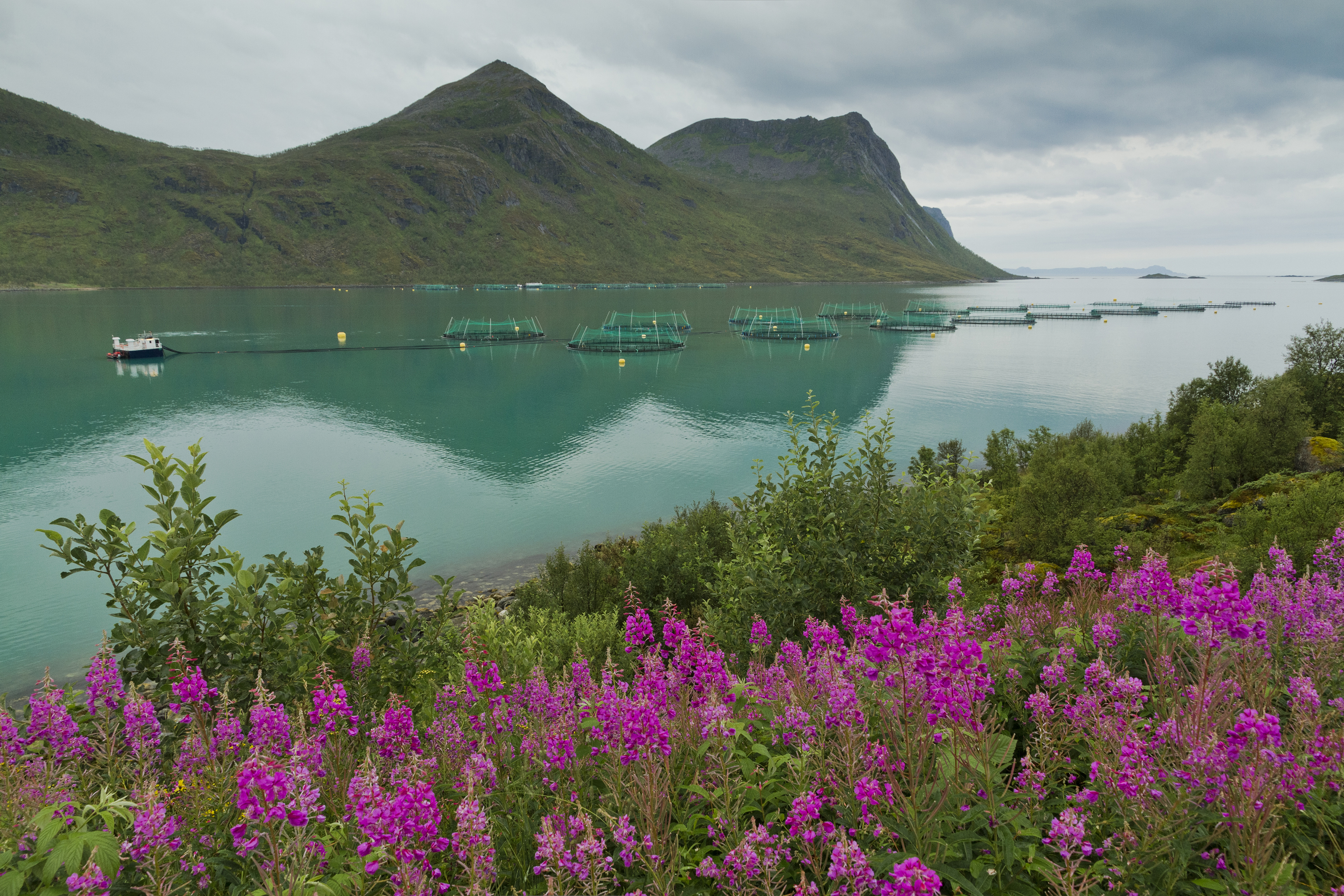
Fish farming is one of the largest industries; more than half a million ton of salmon produced annually in Northern Norway for the world market

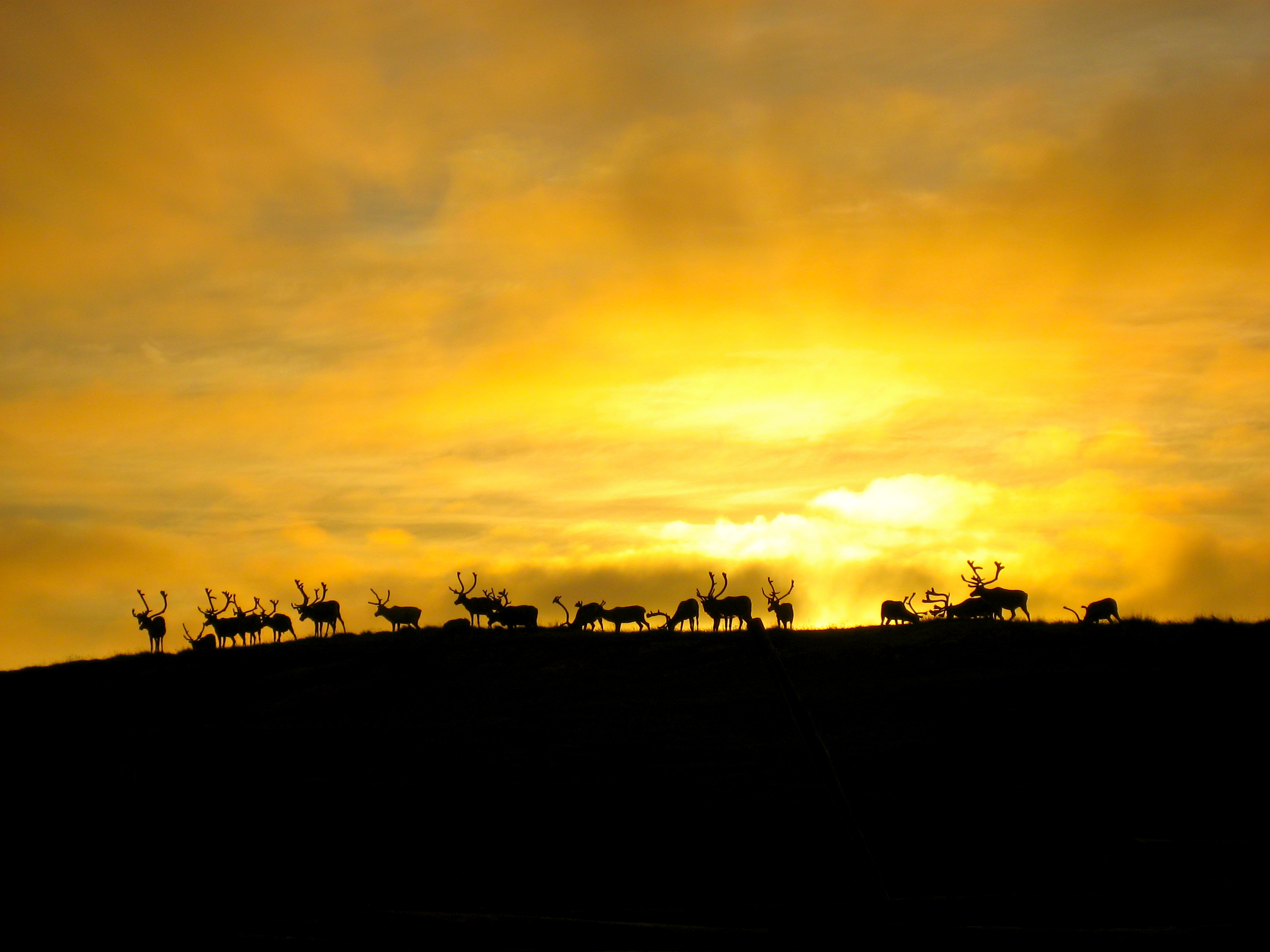
Reindeer at sunset near Bugøynes.

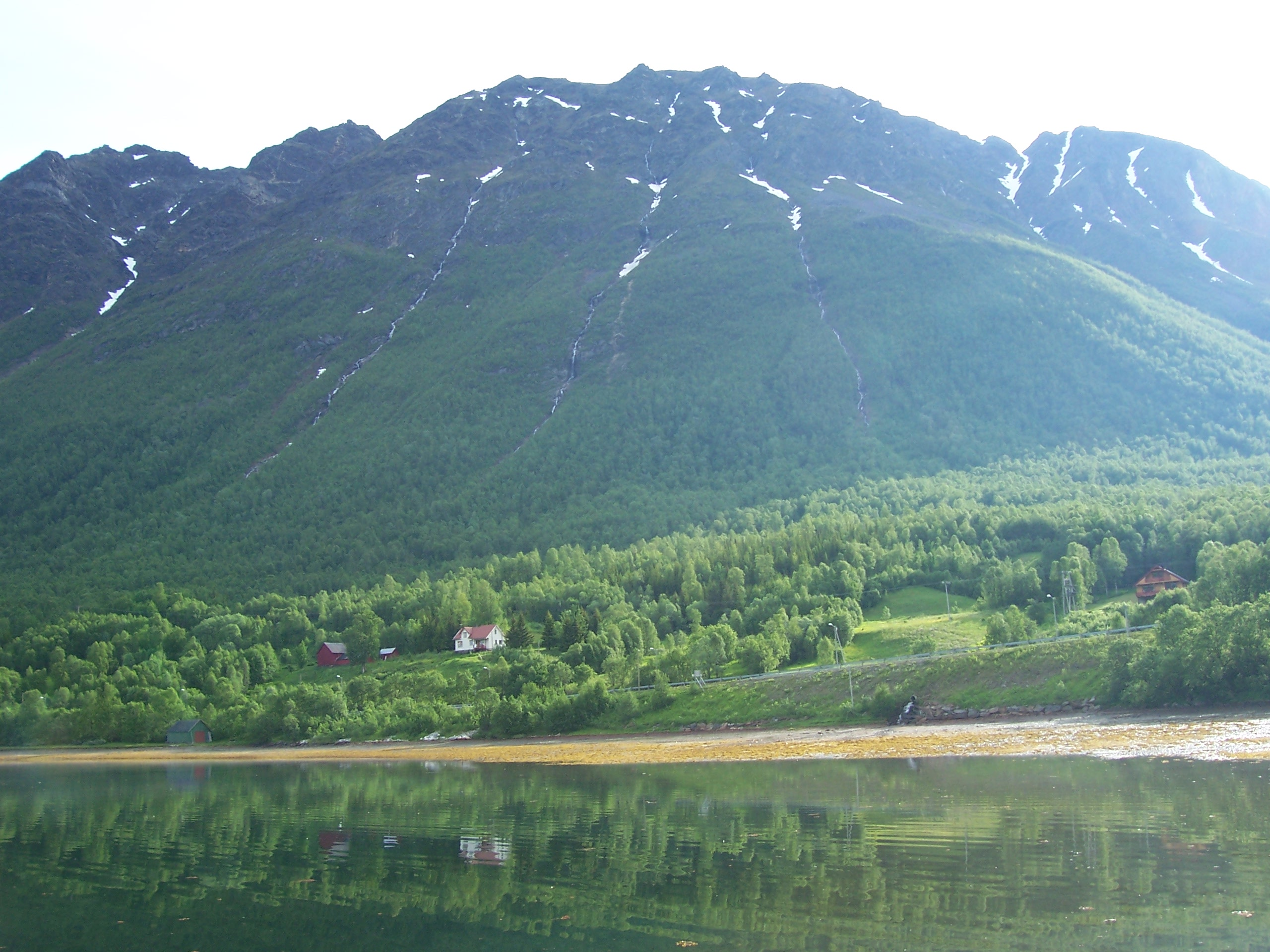
The main fjords remain ice-free all year, but some narrow and shallower fjord branches – like Ramfjord near Tromsø – often freeze over in winter.

Northern Norway is surrounded by some of the richest seas in the world, and seafood is the main source for traditional cuisine. However, agricultural produce has existed for at least 3,000 years in parts of the area (Helgeland, Salten, Lofoten, Harstad-Kvæfjord). In addition to fishing, each family traditionally had a small farm with a few cows (see Pietro Querinis shipwrecked at Røst in 1432), sheep or goats (goats being preferred in many places due to their superior adaptation to the rough and mountainous terrain found in much of Northern Norway) and had small grain fields (mostly barley). After the introduction (and somewhat later acceptance) of potatoes from the Americas, these became a main staple in much of Northern Norway, as well as many other parts of Norway. Agriculture gradually becomes less important as a food source as one moves further north, and in the northern half (north of Balsfjord/Tromsø area) was usually of minor importance and certainly less important than fishing or Sami reindeer nomadic pastoralism. Hunting has been important ever since the Stone Age, and the comparatively large areas of sparsely settled valleys, fells and mountains still hold wildlife.

In the winter, the codfish comes to the coastal waters to spawn, especially to the cod fisheries of Lofoten. Mølja, boiled codfish with liver and roe, is a delicacy that today is served in the best restaurants. In the summer, the coalfish, or saithe, bites, and fresh saithe is often served on the beach, boiled in seawater over an open fire, or fried (typically the smaller coalfish). Halibut is traditional Christmas food. Most fish is served plainly poached, only accompanied by boiled potatoes, carrots and possibly fried bacon. A more particular kind of fish is "gammelsei", saithe that has been conserved for a year or more. Other traditions are lutefisk and boknafisk, the latter made from stockfish, and in Nordland often from herring. Seawolf and rose fish are regarded as good food, the latter often eaten salted and poached, with the brain (krus) highly regarded, sometimes fried with onions. In addition to cod, herring and potatoes were traditional staple foods (except in the most northern area). Salmon has long traditions as food along the rivers, and also trout which are common also in the numerous lakes. In the latest decades consumption has increased in correspondence with increased salmon fish farming; smoked salmon is very popular, often on open sandwiches, alone or together with boiled or scrambled eggs or salad.

Traditionally, northerners regarded shellfish and prawns as bait, but lately they have developed a taste for it, and the freshest and most succulent prawns and shellfish are easily obtainable all along the coast. Shark meat has traditionally not been used as food, even if some can grow nearly 10 metres (33 ft) long. In later years, the large Red king crab has invaded Norwegian waters from the east and, having reached west to Hammerfest, are now served in the finest restaurants. The large sea bird colonies along the coast provided eggs for the local population, yet most of these are now protected by law. However, in Tromsø, sea gull eggs and beer from the local brewery is still a highly regarded dish to enjoy in the sun of late spring.

Tender whale meat is usually served as steaks, whereas seals are an acquired taste, due to the smell. However, when processed into "Barents ham", it gets more palatable. Fresh seal meat is served at the end of the hunting season in spring, and Tromsø is the place to look for it. Reindeer are often served as finnebiff, thin slices in a cream sauce. Reindeer filets have become more popular in high-end restaurants in recent years, but the price can be prohibitive as the reindeer industry is shielded from market forces by the Norwegian government (in essence, it is treated as a vital component of Sami culture, rather than a competitive industry, which means there is little pressure to actually sell the meat products). Lamb meat from sheep following the retreating snow line up the hills and mountains to get the most nutritious fresh vegetation throughout summer is highly regarded by the locals, and research seem to indicate that a varied diet does influence the taste of the meat. Game meat includes mountain hare, rock ptarmigan, willow grouse and moose.

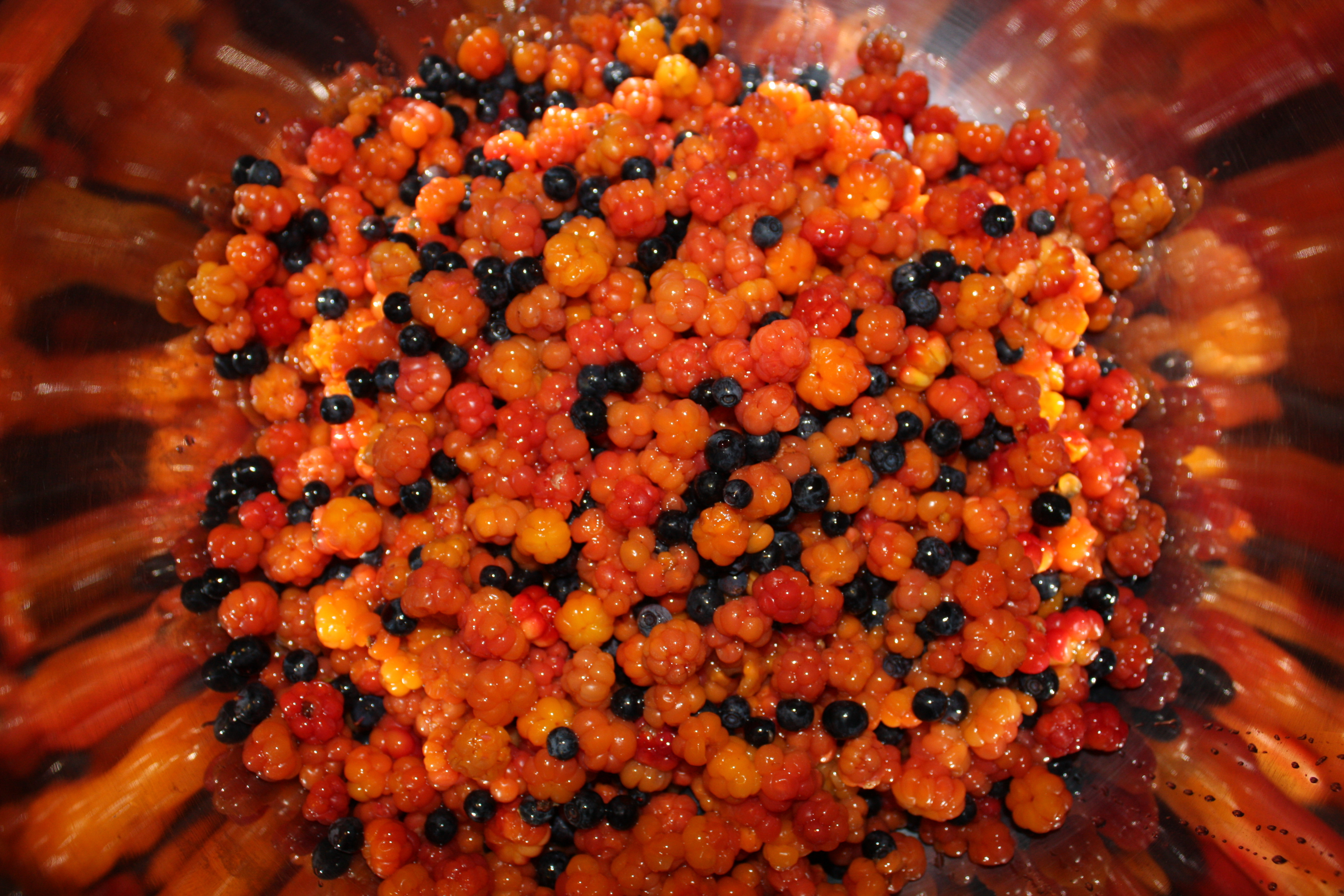
Cloudberries and bilberries (European blueberries)

Foods with dairy as an important ingredient include waffles, pancakes and rømmegrøt (sour-cream porridge), the latter always served with sugar and cinnamon. None of the aforementioned are distinctly Northern Norwegian foods, however, but are popular throughout Norway. There are a number of local traditions in this long region, including goat cheese from Balsfjord Municipality, Blanklefse and other variations of lefse from Helgeland, and a number of variations of reindeer, an integral part of traditional Sami culture.

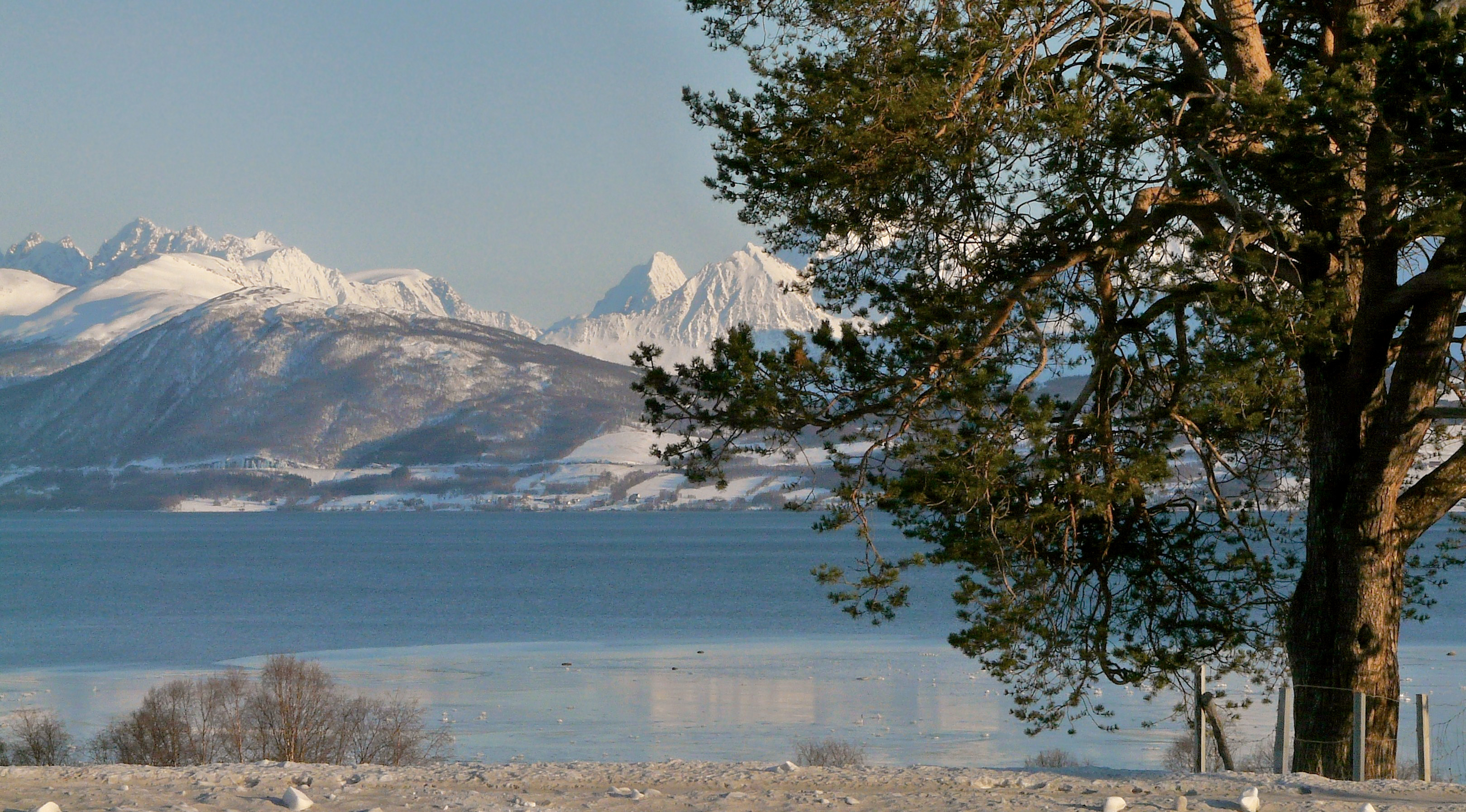
Winter in Balsfjord Municipality, the northernmost municipality in Norway with fairly large agricultural activity.

Wild berries have long traditions in the local cuisine, and the most sought after is the cloudberry, used in marmalade, desserts and cakes. Other popular wild berries are bilberries, lingonberry, raspberry (southern half of region, also cultivated in some private gardens), and there are also a number of less well known berries used for food. Mushrooms are common in the forests from late July to September and also has seen some use in traditional food.

The use of kitchen gardens is limited by climatic factors, but still has a long history in the southern half of the region. Rhubarb and redcurrant has been used for more than 100 years; redcurrant also grows naturally in much of the region, blackcurrant is also common in gardens. In addition to potatoes and carrots, rutabaga and sometimes cabbage have traditionally been grown (very little in Finnmark). Many wild plants were used for medical purposes or as spices, such as Garden Angelica, but this has become rare in modern times. More lately is the imported strawberry which has become popular and are grown locally (mostly southern half of region). The unique growing conditions, with ripening in 24-hr daylight and modest warmth is sometimes claimed to enhance flavor. Bioforsk, with research in terrestrial effects of climate and subarctic agriculture, has branches in four places in Northern Norway – Tromsø, Bodø, Tjøtta and Svanhovd in Sør-Varanger Municipality.

== Climate ==
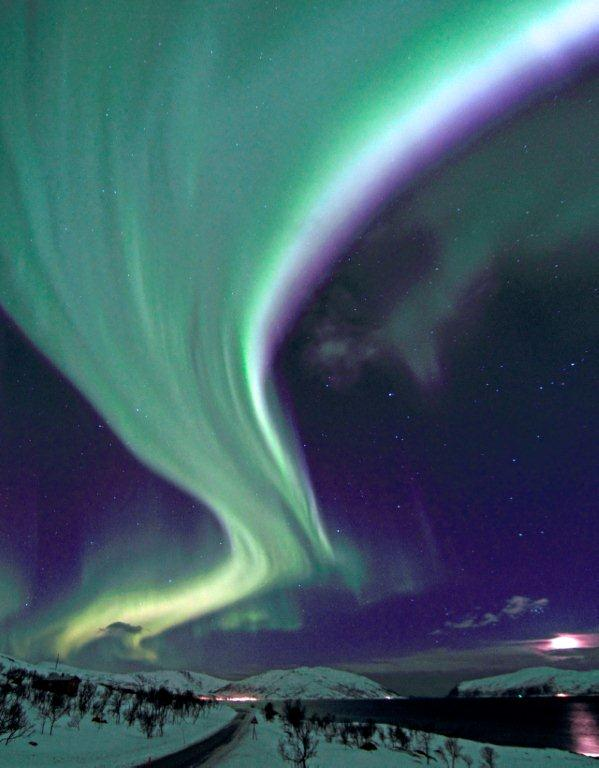
Aurora Borealis in Tromsø.

There are large climatic differences from southwest to northeast in this region. Finnmarksvidda in the interior of Finnmark and some valleys in the interior of Troms, experience a more continental climate with much less precipitation and much colder winters compared to the long coastal region.

=== Light ===
There are extreme variations in daylight between winter and summer. In Nordkapp Municipality the midnight sun can be seen from 11 May to 31 July, and the sun does not rise above the horizon from 19 November to 22 January. For Tromsø, the dates are 17 May to 25 July, and 26 November to 15 January, respectively; and for Bodø from 30 May to 12 July (no polar night in Bodø). The mid-winter darkness is not totally dark on the mainland; there is twilight for about three hours around noon in Tromsø. Helgeland does not have true midnight sun, but the upper part of the sun disc never descends below the horizon as far south as Mosjøen in June. February is a transitional period when the sun rapidly returns, and March and April often feel like an explosion of light with long daylight hours and snow cover in most areas except the coastal strip of Nordland. The Aurora Borealis can be seen in the whole area from autumn to mid-April, after which it gets too bright to observe the Aurora. It is a natural phenomenon arising due to the collision between electrically charged particles from the sun that enter the atmosphere of the earth, and paint the sky all colors from the color palette.

Month	Jan	Feb	Mar	Apr	May	Jun	Jul	Aug	Sep	Oct	Nov	Dec
Bodø sunrise & sunset 15th of each month	10:18 – 14:05	08:16 – 16:18	06:24 – 18:02	05:16 – 20:51	03:06 – 22:56	Midnight sun	01:40 – 00:30	04:27 – 21:43	06:20 – 19:34	08:02 – 17:33	09:04 – 14:29	11:18 – 12:37
Tromsø sunrise & sunset 15th of each month	11:31 – 12:17	08:16 – 15:43	06:07 – 17:41	04:43 – 20:48	01:43 – 23:48	Midnight sun	Midnight sun	03:44 – 21:50	05:56 – 19:20	07:54 – 17:04	09:25 – 13:32	Polar night
Hammerfest sunrise & sunset 15th of each month	Polar night	08:16 – 15:15	05:50 – 17:22	04:17 – 20:37	Midnight sun	Midnight sun	Midnight sun	03:11 – 21:42	05:35 – 19:04	07:41 – 16:39	09:28 – 12:50	Polar night
Source: Almanakk for Norge; University of Oslo, 2010. Note: In December and the first week of January, the very low sun in Bodø is blocked by mountains. In mid-July, the sun sets after midnight in Bodø due to daylight saving. In Tromsø, the sun is below the horizon until 15.January, but is blocked by mountains until 21. January.

=== Temperate oceanic climate to continental boreal climate ===
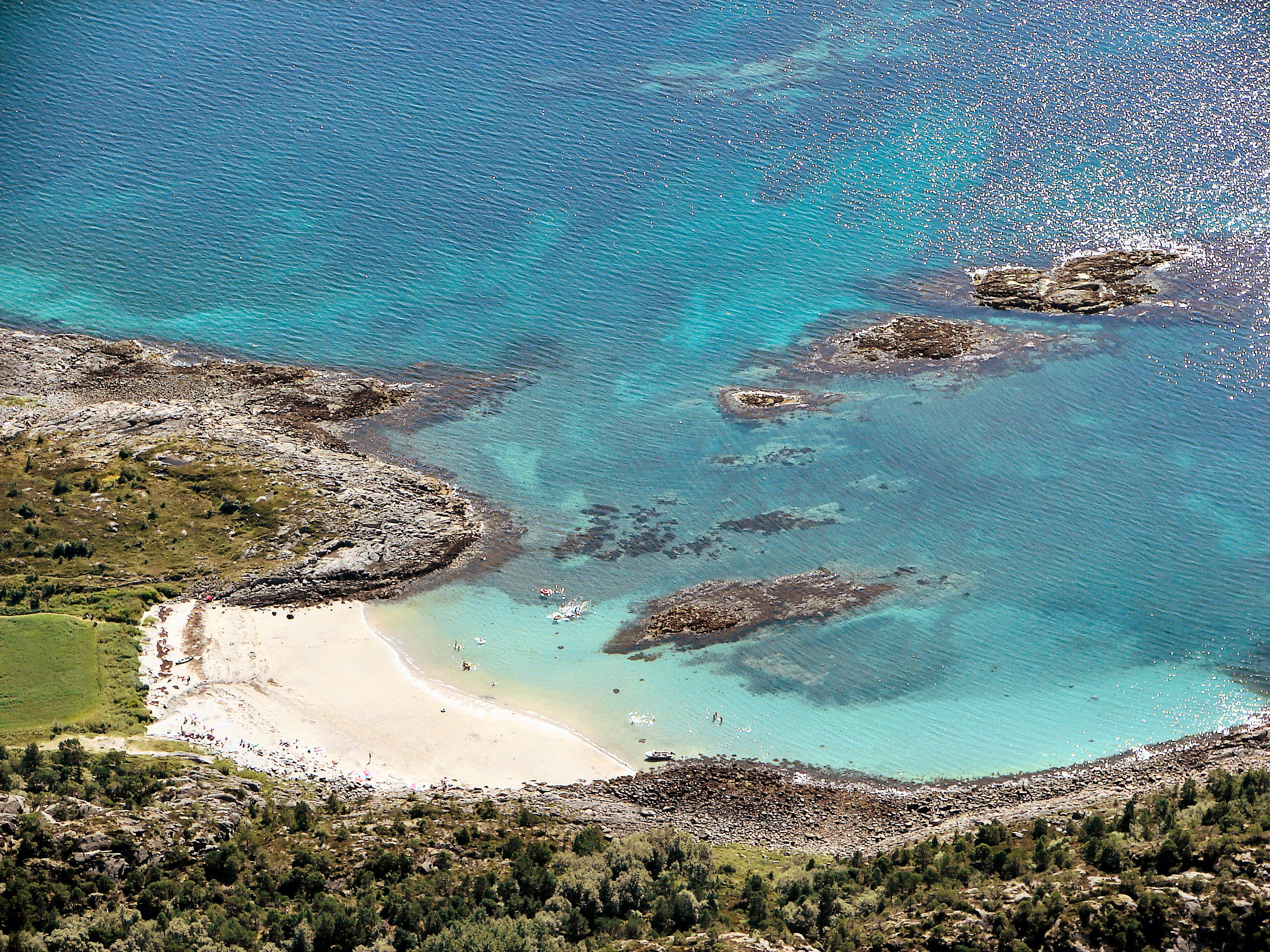
Beach at Vega, this part of the region has a temperate oceanic climate.

The coast of Helgeland in southern Nordland and some islands further north to Skrova in Lofoten have a temperate oceanic climate (Cfb) with monthly mean temperatures above 0 °C (32 °F) in winter, and four months with mean at or above 10 °C (50 °F). This includes the towns Brønnøysund and Sandnessjøen. In the same coastal area, but slightly into the fjords north to include Bodø, is a narrow area where winters are a little colder but summers still lasts four months, making this a humid continental climate (Dfb).

A long area along the coast from Myken island in the south north along the outer coast north to Hasvik Municipality is the subpolar oceanic climate (Cfc) with still not very cold winters (coldest month above −3 °C (27 °F)). This includes much of Lofoten and Vesterålen, the western coast of Troms north to Fruholmen in Måsøy Municipality in Finnmark. Towns in this area includes Leknes, Sortland, Harstad, the mildest parts of Tromsø close to the sea and Hasvik.

The largest part of North Norway are within the boreal climate (also known as subarctic), but with large variation of temperatures and precipitation from south to northeast. Most towns along the fjords falling into this climate zone in North Norway have winters milder and wetter than the typical boreal climate, and a complete lack of permafrost; this includes Mosjøen, Mo i Rana, Narvik, Tromsø and Hammerfest. Colder winters are found in Bardufoss, Alta, Kirkenes and Vadsø. The really cold areas are inland in Finnmark where Karasjok and Kautokeino have mean annual below 0 °C (32 °F) and patchy permafrost. However, the inland towns seldom see strong winds, and Karasjok only experiences on average 1 day/year with strong breeze (22 knots) or more.

A substantial area of the region, especially towards the border with Sweden and north to the Lyngen alps east of Tromsø, are mountains and highlands with alpine tundra climate above the treeline.

The mean annual temperature difference between Brønnøysund (6.6 °C (43.9 °F)) and Kautokeino (−1.4 °C (29.5 °F)) is 8 °C (13 °F), about the same as the difference between Brønnøysund and Madrid, Spain (MADRID/RETIRO, SPAIN Weather History and Climate Data).

The warm climate in coastal areas, relative to other locations at the same latitude, is by many attributed to the relatively warm North Atlantic Current, an extension of the Gulf Stream.

=== Wind ===
Wind strength is strongest in winter and late autumn, when the Lows are strongest. Summers and early autumn are much less windy and will rarely see the wind strength that can be experienced in winter. Every winter sees windstorms disrupting communications (ferries, air traffic), especially along the outer seaboard. However, many winter days are completely calm. The most windy location in continental Norway (apart from mountain summits) is Fruholmen Lighthouse (Fruholmen fyr) in Måsøy Municipality not far from the North Cape. The most windy city in Northern Norway is Bodø with on average 153 days/year with strong breeze or more and 24 days with gale-force winds, while Vardø, also lacking shelter, sees 136 days of strong breeze or more and 18 days with gale. Inland valleys and sheltered fjord areas—particularly if sheltered by mountains—are much less windy. Tromsø, partly sheltered by large islands, experiences on average 27 days/year with strong breeze, and 1 day with gale, and Bardufoss sees on average only 11 days with strong breeze or more and scarcely ever experiences gale. In winter, there might sometimes blow cold winds from the freezing highlands out through the large fjords, −10 °C (14 °F) and strong breeze will feel very cold on the skin. Mild westerlies are still much more common in most winters. Weather patterns are inherently unpredictable in this northern region—both low pressure and high pressure weather can occur at any time of year, although the strongest winds occur in winter.

=== Winter ===
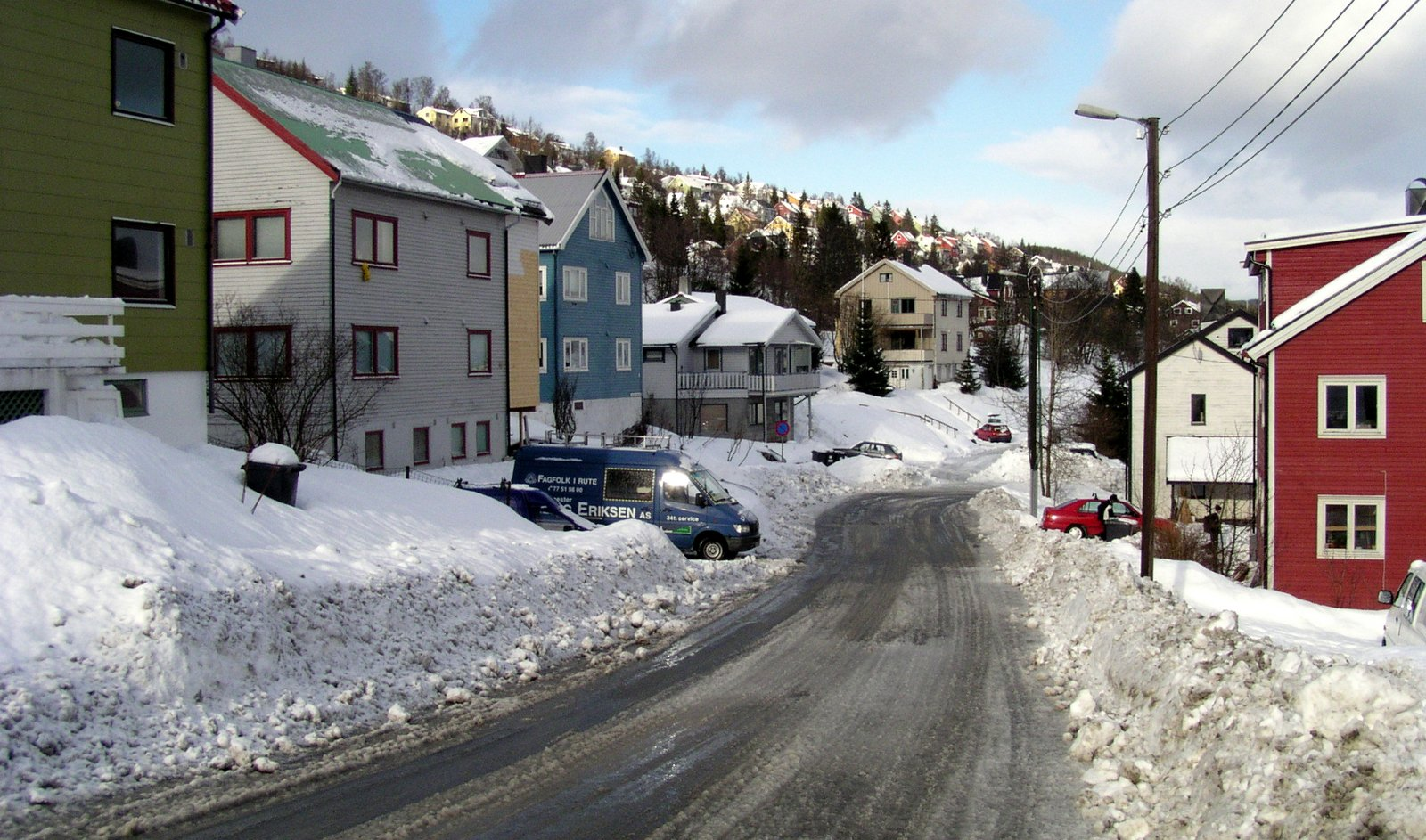
Tromsø street in March 2006. Snow cover persists for many months in most areas, this also insulates the ground from the cold.

Along the coast of Nordland north to southern Vesterålen, average winter temperatures hover just above freezing, getting gradually colder winters into the fjords, and the coldest are inland. Inland Finnmark, as in Karasjok, average temperatures remain below freezing for 7 months (October–April). In Tromsø, average temperatures stays below freezing for 4–5 months.

=== Summer ===
Even if winter temperatures depends largely on the distance to the sea, the length of the season varies mostly with latitude (and altitude). While the southern coast of Nordland have four months of summer, the northeasternmost areas just averages two months, such as Kirkenes and Vadsø. The warmest summer daily highs are in the inland valleys and sheltered fjords, in towns like Mosjøen, Rognan, Narvik, Bardufoss, Alta and Karasjok. A small strip of land along the extreme northeastern coast from Nordkapp Municipality to Vardø Municipality was earlier partly tundra (Arctic climate) due to lack of summer warmth, however with the updated climate normals 1991–2020, summers have warmed and the tundra climate has changed to a boreal climate along this northernmost coast, but still with very modest summer warmth.

=== Precipitation ===
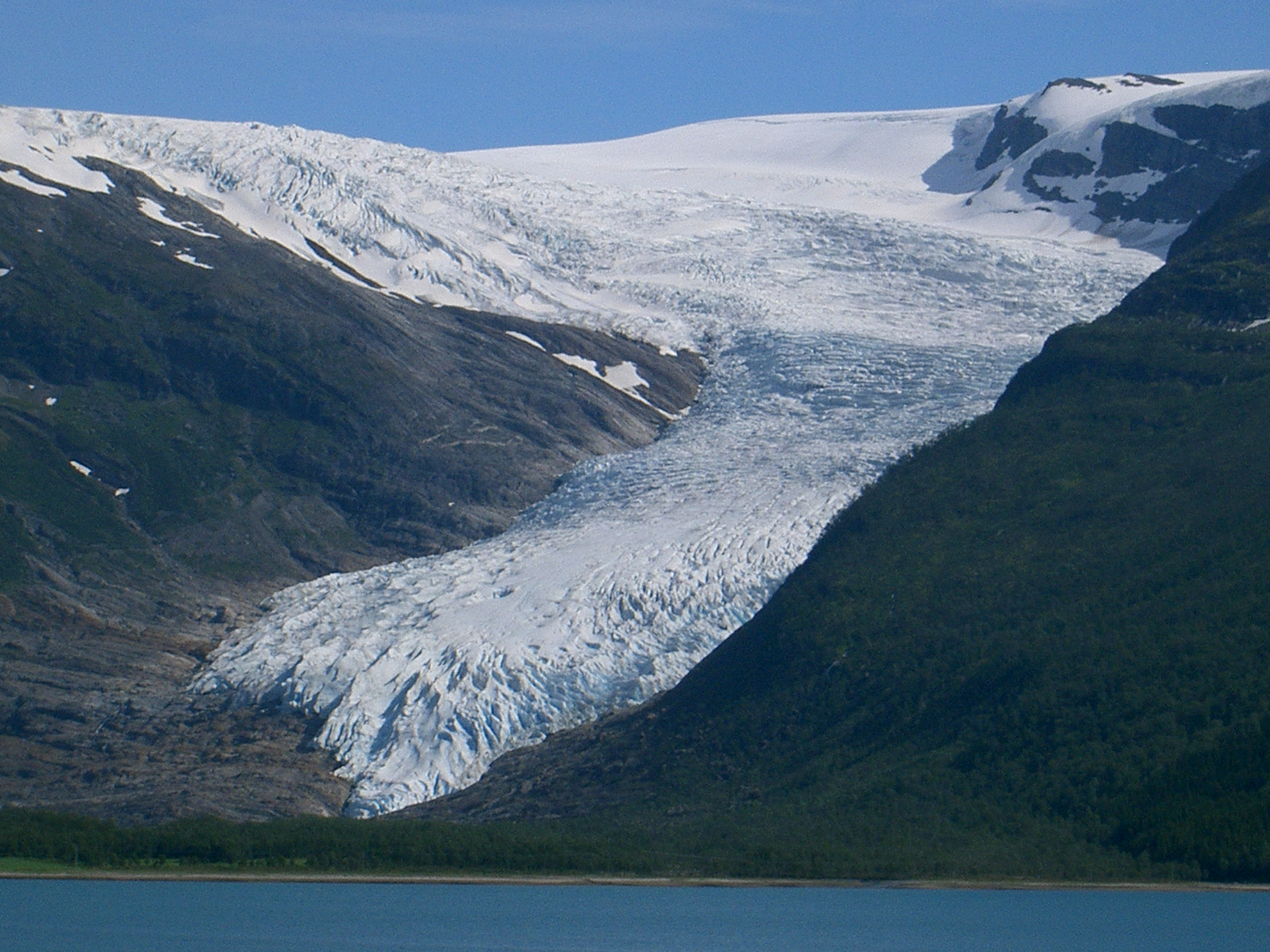
Svartisen glacier is dependent on heavy snow in winter. The western side of the mountains get up to 2,000 millimetres (79 in) precipitation annually, such as Glomfjord.

Precipitation occur in all seasons, usually as snow in winter, although often as rain on the Nordland coast. Snow accumulation in the mountains can exceed 3 metres (9.8 ft), and this abundance of snow is the reason for the numerous glaciers – more than 500, mostly in Nordland and Troms.

Autumn, and some places along the coast winter, tend to be the wettest season, often receiving more than twice as much precipitation as does spring and early summer. Only the interior areas of Finnmark tend to be wettest in summer. The areas with the least precipitation are some inland valleys, like Dividalen in Målselv Municipality with only 282 millimetres (11.1 in) precip/year, and upper Saltdal and Skibotn with about the same. Inland Finnmark is the only large area with less than 450 millimetres (18 in) precipitation/year. The wettest areas are generally the Helgeland region; Lurøy Municipality on the west coast of Saltfjell averages 2,900 millimetres (110 in)/year.

=== Record temperatures ===
The coldest temperature recorded is −51.4 °C (−60.5 °F) in Karasjok on 1.January 1886, and the warmest recorded is 35 °C (95 °F) at Mosjøen Airport on 27 July 2019. Many locations in North Norway have recorded what Norwegians know as "tropical nights" when the overnight low does not fall below 20 °C (68 °F). The warmest night ever recorded in Norway was 29 July 2019 at Sømna-Kvaløyfjellet (302 m) in Sømna Municipality near Brønnøysund with overnight low 26.1 °C (79.0 °F). The third warmest night recorded in Norway was at Makkaur in Båtsfjord Municipality with overnight low 25.2 °C (77.4 °F) on 19 July 2018.

Brønnøysund at 65 degrees north latitude has a temperate oceanic climate and few extremes even with 150 years of recording.

Climate data for Brønnøysund Airport 1991-2020 (9 m, precipitation 1961-90, extremes 1873-2020 includes earlier stations)
Month	Jan	Feb	Mar	Apr	May	Jun	Jul	Aug	Sep	Oct	Nov	Dec	Year
Record high °C (°F)	10.2 (50.4)	10.9 (51.6)	14.7 (58.5)	21.1 (70.0)	27.2 (81.0)	30.3 (86.5)	32.1 (89.8)	30.1 (86.2)	24.6 (76.3)	20.3 (68.5)	17.6 (63.7)	12.2 (54.0)	32.1 (89.8)
Mean daily maximum °C (°F)	2 (36)	2 (36)	4 (39)	8 (46)	12 (54)	15 (59)	18 (64)	17 (63)	14 (57)	9 (48)	6 (43)	4 (39)	9 (49)
Daily mean °C (°F)	1.1 (34.0)	0.4 (32.7)	1.4 (34.5)	4.7 (40.5)	8.1 (46.6)	11.2 (52.2)	14.3 (57.7)	14 (57)	11.1 (52.0)	6.8 (44.2)	4 (39)	1.9 (35.4)	6.6 (43.8)
Mean daily minimum °C (°F)	0 (32)	−1 (30)	−1 (30)	2 (36)	5 (41)	9 (48)	12 (54)	12 (54)	9 (48)	5 (41)	2 (36)	1 (34)	5 (40)
Record low °C (°F)	−17.1 (1.2)	−18.4 (−1.1)	−15.5 (4.1)	−10.1 (13.8)	−5 (23)	0 (32)	1 (34)	1.1 (34.0)	−4.4 (24.1)	−5.2 (22.6)	−11.3 (11.7)	−18.2 (−0.8)	−18.4 (−1.1)
Average precipitation mm (inches)	138 (5.4)	102 (4.0)	114 (4.5)	97 (3.8)	66 (2.6)	83 (3.3)	123 (4.8)	113 (4.4)	180 (7.1)	192 (7.6)	145 (5.7)	157 (6.2)	1,510 (59.4)
Source 1: yr.no – Meteorologisk Institutt
Source 2: Weatheronline.co.uk

Lakselv in Porsanger Municipality at 70 degrees north latitude has a continental boreal climate with cold winters and sparse precipitation.

Climate data for Lakselv Airport, Banak in Porsanger 1991-2020 (5 m, extremes 1979-2022)
Month	Jan	Feb	Mar	Apr	May	Jun	Jul	Aug	Sep	Oct	Nov	Dec	Year
Record high °C (°F)	9.4 (48.9)	9.4 (48.9)	13 (55)	15.9 (60.6)	25.7 (78.3)	32.5 (90.5)	34.3 (93.7)	32.8 (91.0)	25 (77)	15.1 (59.2)	11.9 (53.4)	10.1 (50.2)	34.3 (93.7)
Mean daily maximum °C (°F)	−4.2 (24.4)	−4.5 (23.9)	−0.9 (30.4)	3.6 (38.5)	9 (48)	13.7 (56.7)	17.4 (63.3)	15.8 (60.4)	11.4 (52.5)	4.5 (40.1)	−0.4 (31.3)	−2.2 (28.0)	5.3 (41.5)
Daily mean °C (°F)	−7.9 (17.8)	−7.9 (17.8)	−4.5 (23.9)	0.1 (32.2)	5.3 (41.5)	9.6 (49.3)	12.9 (55.2)	11.6 (52.9)	7.8 (46.0)	1.9 (35.4)	−3.4 (25.9)	−5.7 (21.7)	1.7 (35.0)
Mean daily minimum °C (°F)	−11.8 (10.8)	−11.8 (10.8)	−8.5 (16.7)	−3.7 (25.3)	1.6 (34.9)	6.1 (43.0)	9.2 (48.6)	7.8 (46.0)	4.5 (40.1)	−0.8 (30.6)	−6.5 (20.3)	−9.2 (15.4)	−1.9 (28.5)
Record low °C (°F)	−33.6 (−28.5)	−33 (−27)	−29.9 (−21.8)	−24.7 (−12.5)	−11.4 (11.5)	−1.6 (29.1)	−0.2 (31.6)	−3.1 (26.4)	−9.2 (15.4)	−21.2 (−6.2)	−26.4 (−15.5)	−30 (−22)	−33.6 (−28.5)
Average precipitation mm (inches)	24.7 (0.97)	18.5 (0.73)	19.9 (0.78)	17.1 (0.67)	25.5 (1.00)	42.5 (1.67)	57.2 (2.25)	54.3 (2.14)	37.7 (1.48)	33.4 (1.31)	23.6 (0.93)	27.5 (1.08)	381.9 (15.01)
Average precipitation days (≥ 1.0 mm)	12	11	12	13	14	15	17	16	15	15	12	14	166
Source 1: yr.no/Norwegian Meteorological Institute
Source 2: NOAA WMO averages 91-2020 Norway

== Towns ==
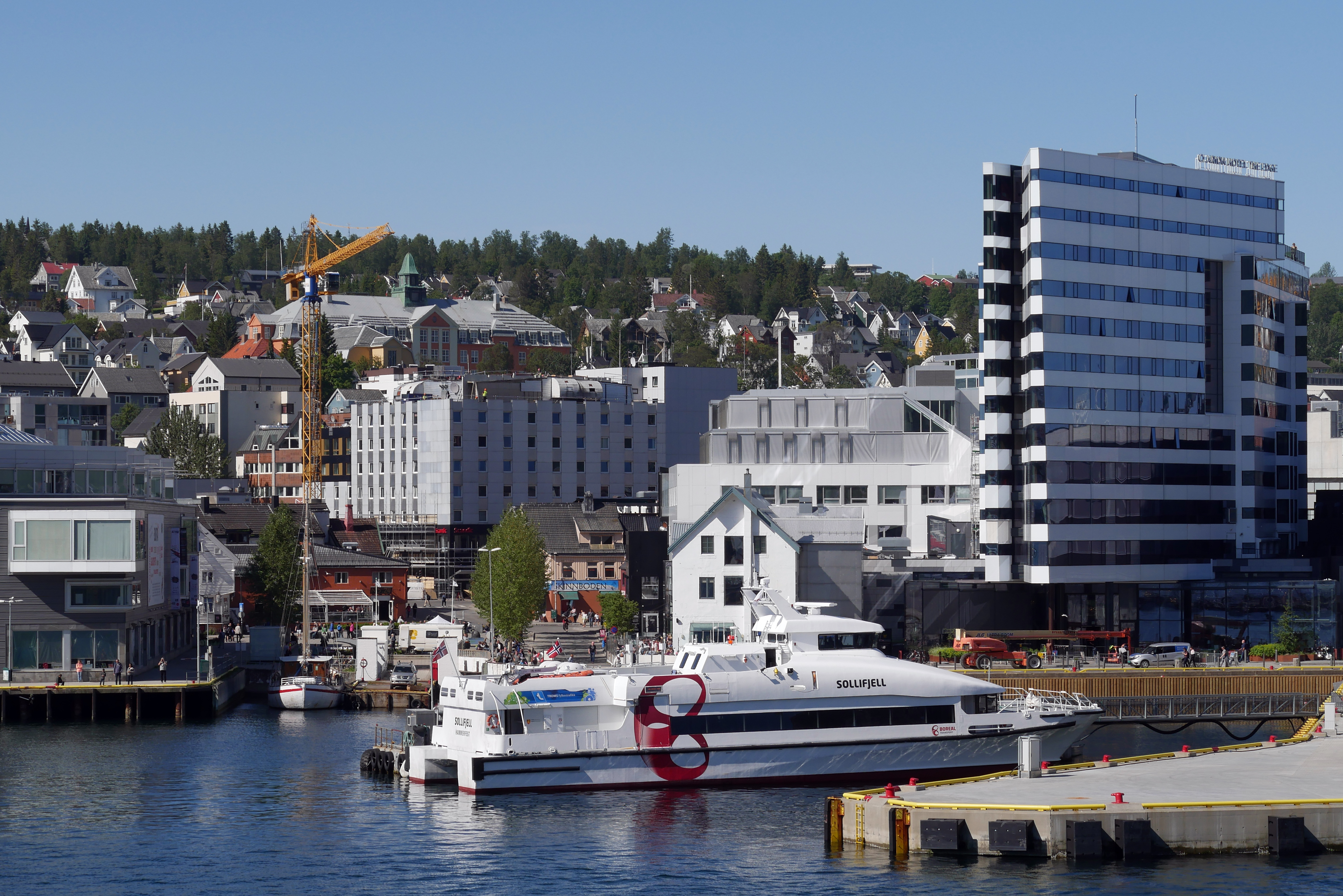
Part of Tromsø's waterfront

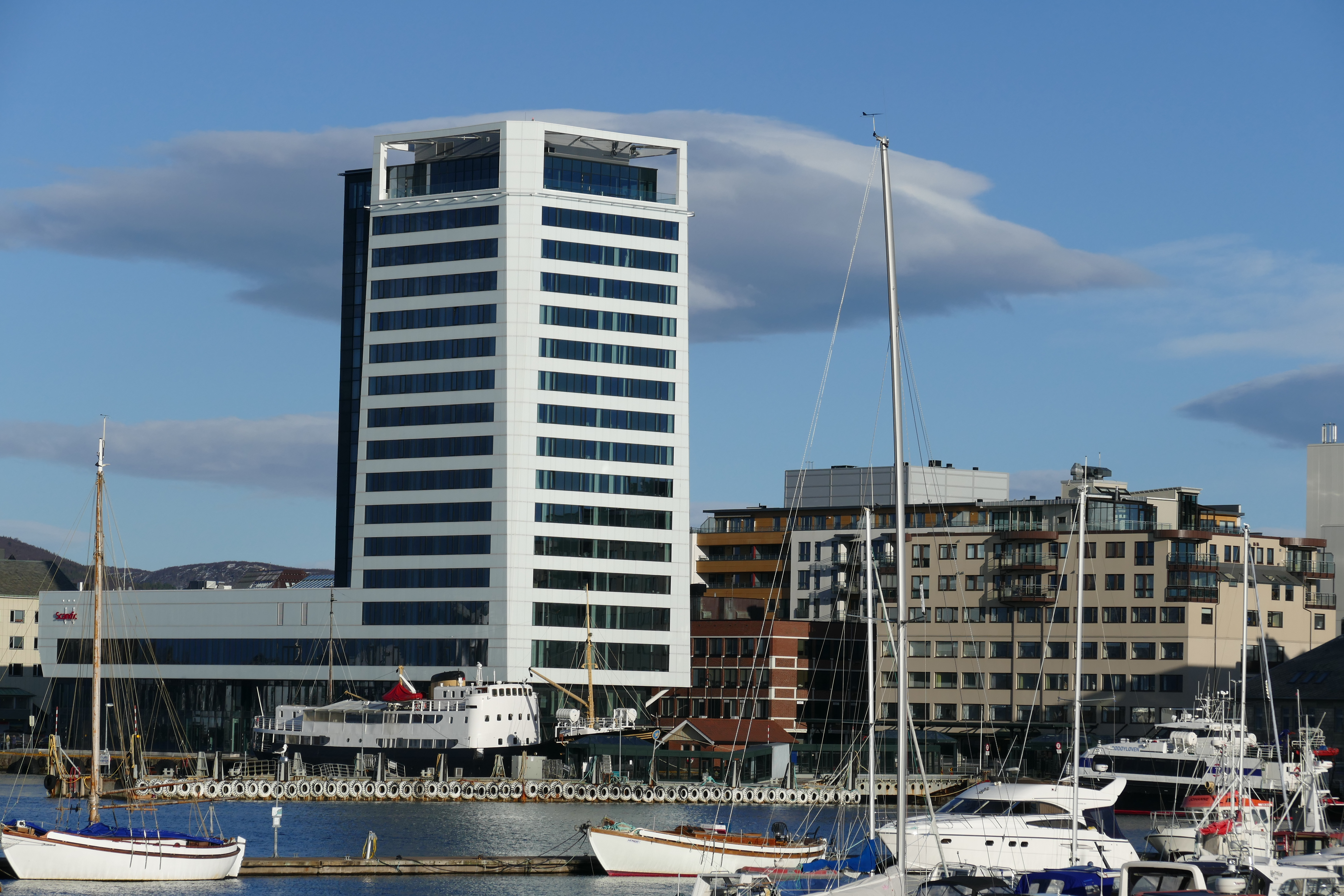
Bodø is well connected with airport, railway, road and harbor

Ranked by population in the town itself (not the municipality) as of 1. January 2008:

- Tromsø
- Bodø

Towns with fewer than 30,000 inhabitants, ranked by population:

- Harstad
- Mo i Rana
- Narvik
- Alta
- Mosjøen
- Hammerfest
- Fauske
- Sandnessjøen
- Vadsø

Towns with fewer than 5,000 inhabitants, ranked by population:

- Sortland
- Brønnøysund
- Svolvær
- Finnsnes
- Kirkenes
- Stokmarknes
- Honningsvåg
- Leknes
- Vardø

There are settlements larger than Vardø which are not included in the list as they have not been granted or designated as a town (such as Rognan, Løding, Andenes, Setermoen and Skjervøy).

== Transportation ==
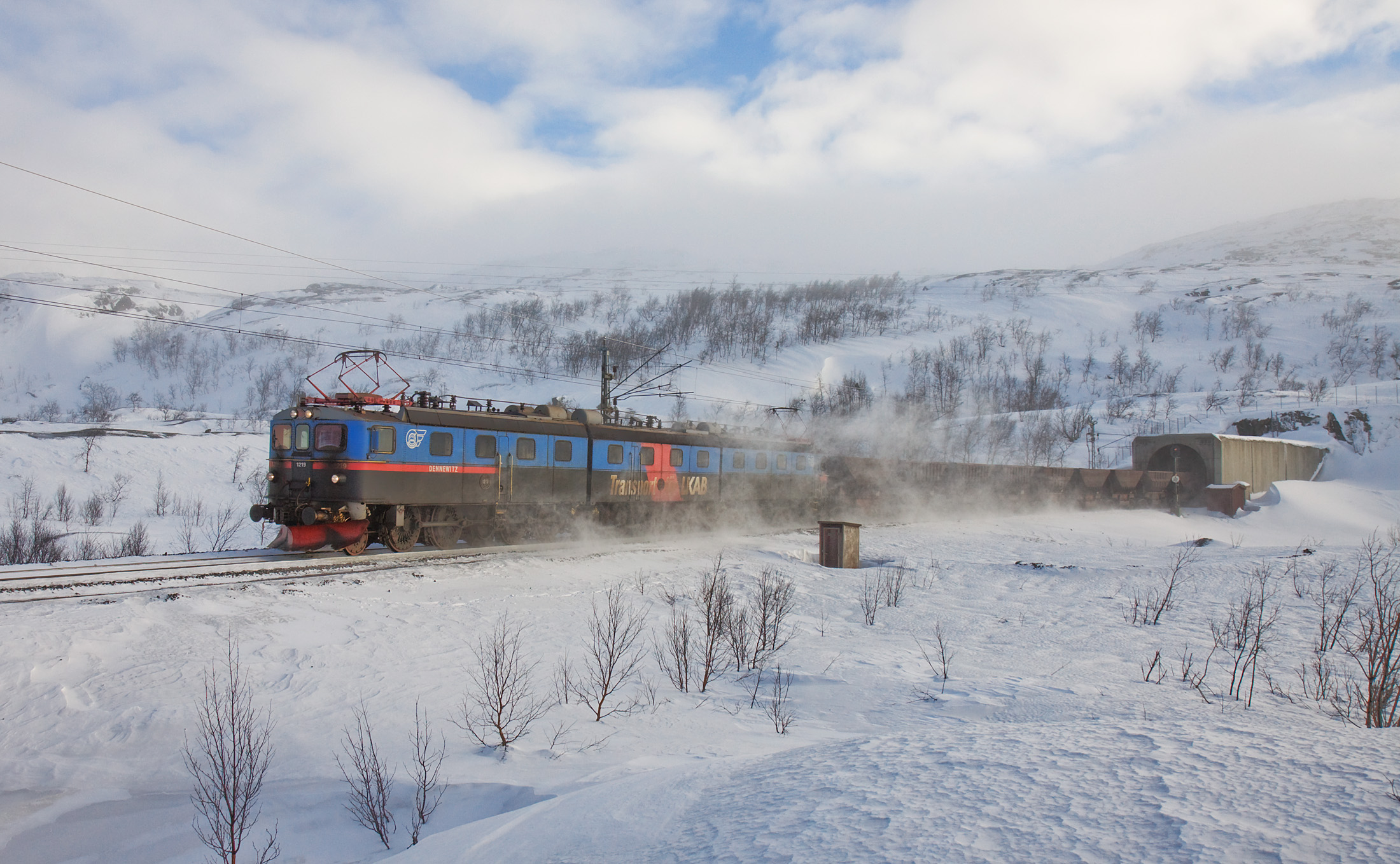
Train on the Ofoten Line crossing the mountains from Sweden to Narvik, which is the largest port in Northern Norway due to the iron ore shipment

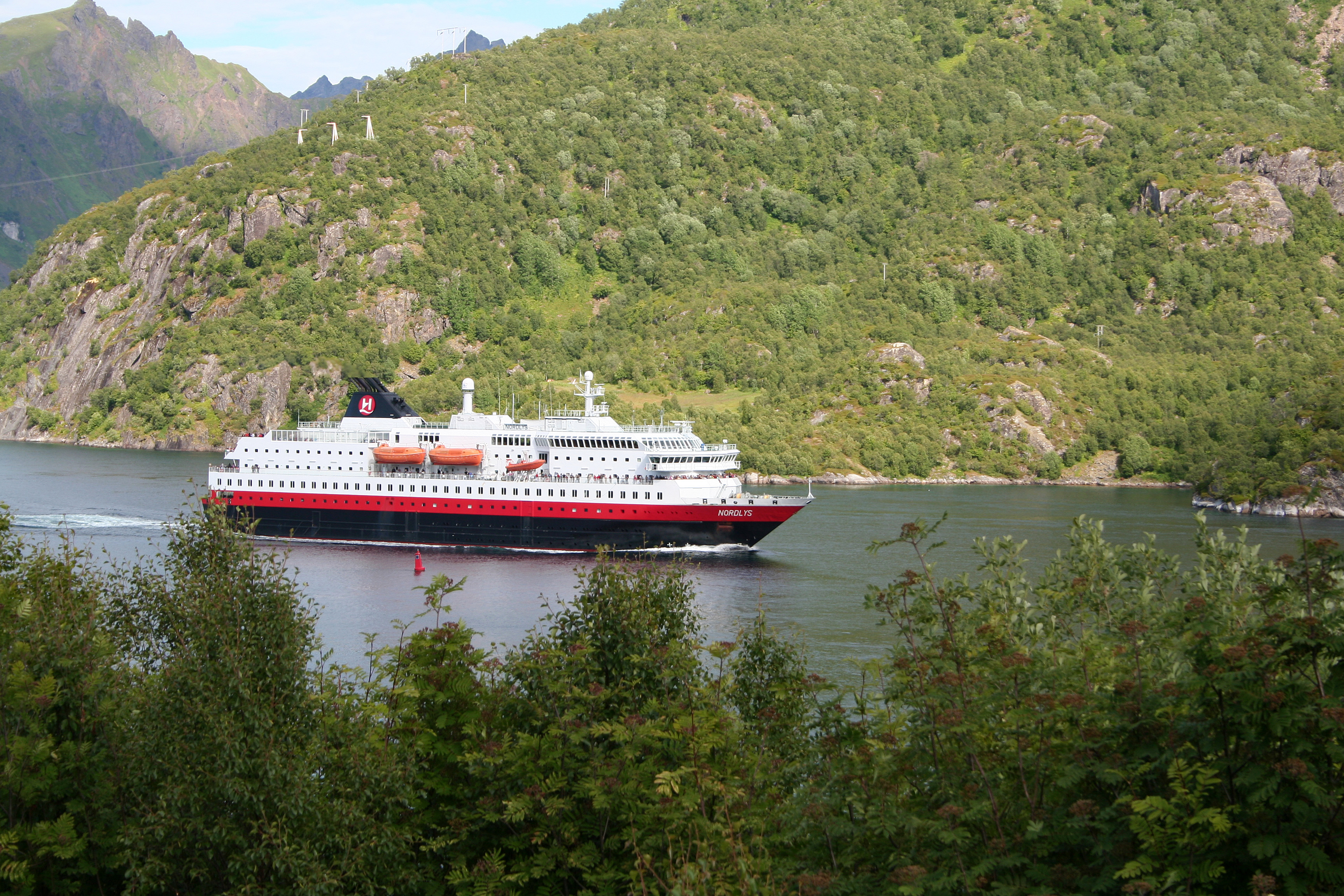
Hurtigruta in Raftsund near Trollfjord.

Northern Norway, located at the very northern periphery of Europe, has seen great improvements in transportation infrastructure in recent decades. The road network connects virtually all villages and towns, the most important roads are the E6, E10, E8. Seven road sections in the region are National Tourist Routes in Norway due to their scenic surroundings, from Helgeland in the south to the Varanger Peninsula in the northeast, including two sections of the Norwegian County Road 17. Airports with long runways and direct flights to Oslo airport are located in Tromsø, Bodø, Evenes (near Harstad), Alta, Kirkenes and Bardufoss, and there are also directs flights connecting Brønnøysund and Sandnessjøen with Oslo. There are smaller airports with regional flights near most towns. For Bodø, Fauske, Mo i Rana and Mosjøen the Nordland Line provides railway connection south to Trondheim (and on to Oslo), while Narvik has railway connection east to Sweden (and on to Stockholm). The Hurtigruten calls at many ports in the region. Goods that are needed in northern Norway are generally freighted by train to Bodø or Narvik, and there reloaded to trucks. The freight trains from Oslo to Narvik has the majority of the amount. Export of fish and other products use the same trains in the reverse direction.

== Sport ==
The Northern Norwegian Cup was a football tournament played from 1929 to 1969. The Eliteserien, Norway's primary men's football league, features two Northern teams in the current 2023 season, FK Bodø/Glimt and Tromsø IL. In women's football, IK Grand Bodø and Medkila IL (from Harstad) will play in the 1. divisjon, the second tier of Norwegian football.

In ice hockey, the Narvik IK plays in the second-tier Norwegian First Division. In basketball, the BLNO has featured the Tromsø Storm and Harstad Vikings.

The Arctic Race of Norway is a cycling road race of the UCI Europe Tour held since 2013.

The Tromsø Midnight Sun Marathon is a marathon race held under midnight sun.

== Notable people ==
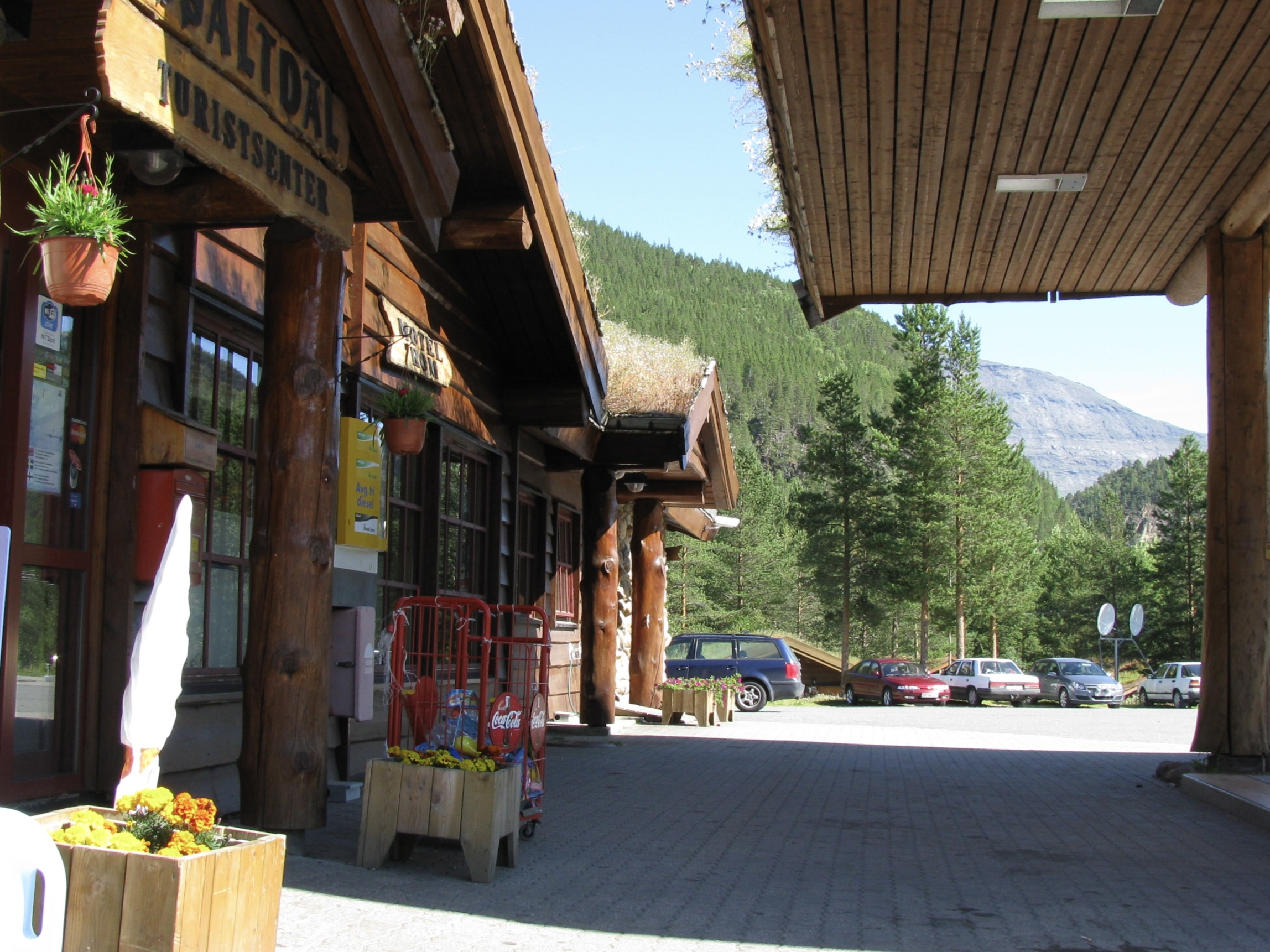
The European route E6 is the main road to the north; Storjord in Saltdal Municipality by the E6 is situated just north of the Arctic Circle. Picture is of Saltdal tourist centre.

- Harald "Dutte" Berg (born 1941), a football player
- Mari Boine (born 1956), a Sámi joik/folk singer from Karasjok
- Petter Dass (1647–1707), a Norwegian baroque poet from Alstahaug Municipality
- Ailo Gaup (born 1980), a FMX World Champion from Tromsø
- Mads Gilbert, a professor of emergency medicine from Tromsø
- Knut Hamsun (1859–1952), an author and Nobel laureate from Hamarøy
- Helmer Hanssen (1870–1956), an explorer with Amundsen's team to the South Pole in 1911 from Bjørnskinn Municipality
- Geir Lundestad (born 1945), the director of the Nobel Institute and professor of history from Bodø
- Lene Marlin (born 1980), a singer and songwriter, from Tromsø
- Morten Gamst Pedersen (born 1981), a football player from Vadsø Municipality
- The Röyksopp band duo Torbjørn Brundtland (born 1975) and Svein Berge, from Tromsø Municipality
- Trond Sollied (born 1959), a football manager who was ranked as the ninth best manager in 2006
- Iselin Steiro (born 1985), a supermodel from Harstad
- Otto Sverdrup, an Arctic explorer from Bindal Municipality
- Hans Erik Dyvik Husby ("Hank Von Helvete") (1972–2021), a vocalist in the death-punk band Turbonegro

== See also ==
- Arctic policy of Norway
