= Stuorrajekna =

Glacier in Sweden

- Interactive map of Stuorrajekna
- Location: Norrbotten County, Sweden
- Coordinates: 67°08′N 16°28′E
- Area: 13 km^{2} (5.0 sq mi)

Stuorrajekna is the largest glacier in Sweden, with an area of 13 km^{2} (5.0 sq mi). It is located in the Sulitjelma massif in the southeastern Padjelanta National Park in Lapland.
