= Suliskongen =

Mountain in Nordland, Norway

- Interactive map of the mountain

Highest point
- Elevation: 1,908 m (6,260 ft)
- Prominence: 1,009.4 m (3,312 ft)
- Isolation: 45.4 to 45.6 km (28.2 to 28.3 mi)
- Coordinates: 67.1468°N 16.3773°E

Geography
- Location: Nordland, Norway
- Parent range: Sulitjelma massif

Suliskongen is a mountain in Fauske Municipality in Nordland county, Norway. The 1,908-metre (6,260 ft) tall mountain is part of the Sulitjelma massif and it is the second highest mountain in Northern Norway. It is located about 17 kilometres (11 mi) east of the village of Sulitjelma and the peak of the mountain lies less than 900 metres (3,000 ft) west of the border with Sweden. The Sulitjelma Glacier lies on the mountain.
