= Gjømmervatnet =

Lake in Bodø, Norway

Gjømmervatnet (Norwegian); Siggajávrre (Lule Sami)
- Interactive map of the lake
- Location: Bodø Municipality, Nordland
- Coordinates: 67.0616°N 14.8933°E
- Basin countries: Norway
- Max. length: 5 kilometres (3.1 mi)
- Max. width: 2 kilometres (1.2 mi)
- Surface area: 6.66 km^{2} (2.57 sq mi)
- Shore length^{1}: 20.53 kilometres (12.76 mi)
- Surface elevation: 400 metres (1,300 ft)
- References: NVE
- ^{1} Shore length is not a well-defined measure.

Gjømmervatnet (Norwegian) or Siggajávrre (Lule Sami) is a lake that lies in Bodø Municipality in Nordland county, Norway. The 6.66-square-kilometre (2.57 sq mi) lake lies about 7 kilometres (4.3 mi) southwest of the village of Misvær (in what used to be Skjerstad Municipality). The lake is regulated for use for the Oldereid Hydroelectric Power Station, northwest of Misvær.

== See also ==
- List of lakes in Norway
- Geography of Norway
