= Oldereid Hydroelectric Power Station =

Oldereid Power Station
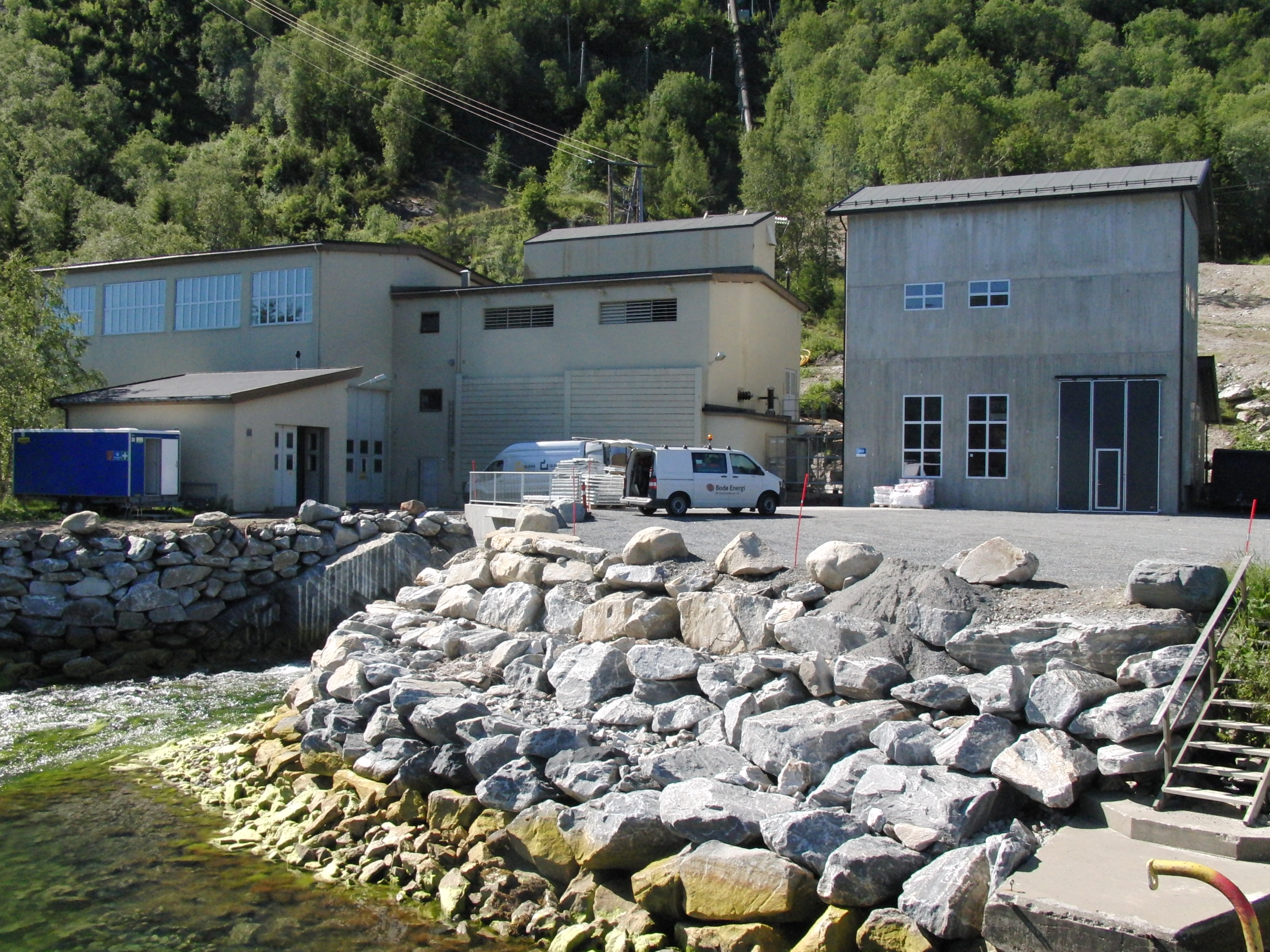
- The old plant (left) and new plant (right)
- Official name: Oldereid kraftverk
- Country: Norway
- Location: Misvær, Nordland
- Coordinates: 67°07′46″N 14°57′20″E
- Status: Operational
- Construction began: 1949
- Opening date: 1953; 72 years ago

Power Station
- Hydraulic head: 321 m (1,053 ft)
- Turbines: 1 × 15 MW
- Pump-generators: 0
- Pumps: 0
- Installed capacity: 15 MW
- Capacity factor: 60.9%
- Annual generation: 80 GW·h (planned)

The Oldereid Hydroelectric Power Station (Norwegian: Oldereid kraftverk or Oldereid kraftstasjon) is a hydroelectric power station in Misvær in Nordland county, Norway.

The plant utilizes a drop of 321 meters (1,053 ft), drawing water from the watercourses of the Oldereid and Skred rivers. The plant uses Lake Børnup as a reservoir, regulated between an elevation of 320 m (1,050 ft) and 308 m (1,010 ft). Water is also supplied from two other lakes: Gjømmervatnet (Lule Sami: Siggajávrre), regulated between 398 m (1,306 ft) and 389 m (1,276 ft), and Mangevatnet, regulated between 472 m (1,549 ft) and 465 m (1,526 ft).

The plant has a single turbine with an installed capacity of 12 megawatts (16,000 hp) and an average annual production of about 60 gigawatt-hours (220 TJ). Its catchment area is 50 square kilometers (19 sq mi). The plant is owned by Salten Kraftsamband and became operational in 1953. The owner has obtained a license for further development, and water from two more lakes, Tindvatn and Lurfjellvatnet, will be transferred to the power plant. The Oldereid plant replaced what were originally six smaller river plants in the area.

== Original installation ==
In 1945, the municipalities of Bodø, Skjerstad, Fauske, Saltdal, and Sørfold started negotiations on building a conventional hydroelectric power station. The options were Daja in the Sulitjelma drainage system or the Oldereid drainage system, but the authorities were unable to reach an agreement, and so the Norwegian Water Resources and Energy Directorate had to make the choice. The decision was made in 1948 and the size of the facility was determined by the guidelines set up for electricity supply. Only Bodø and Skjerstad approved the decision, and Salten Kraftlag was founded in April 1949. Bodø became a shareholder with 90% ownership and Skjerstad with 10%.

From the intake at Lake Børnup, a 2,600 m (8,500 ft) drift tunnel was blasted out with a cross-section of 5 square meters (54 sq ft). Storage basins were created on the hill above the plant, Enghammeren, with the transition to turbine pipes located along the mountainside. The pipeline was 750 m (2,460 ft) long with a diameter of 1.35 to 1.1 m (4 ft 5 in to 3 ft 7 in). The total catchment area was calculated at 49.4 km^{2} (19.1 sq mi). A Pelton wheel supplied by Voith was installed in the plant powered by a net drop of 298 m (978 ft). The plant had a 14.0 MVA generator supplied by British Thomson-Houston. There were originally three outgoing power lines: two 20 kV lines to Skjerstad and one 60 kV line to Bodø.

== New station ==
On 10 October 2016 Oldereid 2 was officially inaugurated after it went into production in 2015 following 18 months of construction. The new plant can produce 15 megawatts (20,000 hp) with a single Francis turbine and is expected to increase the annual production by 10 gigawatt-hours (36 TJ) to a projected 80 gigawatt-hours (290 TJ) annually.
