= Misvær Church =

Church in Nordland, Norway

- Misvær kirke
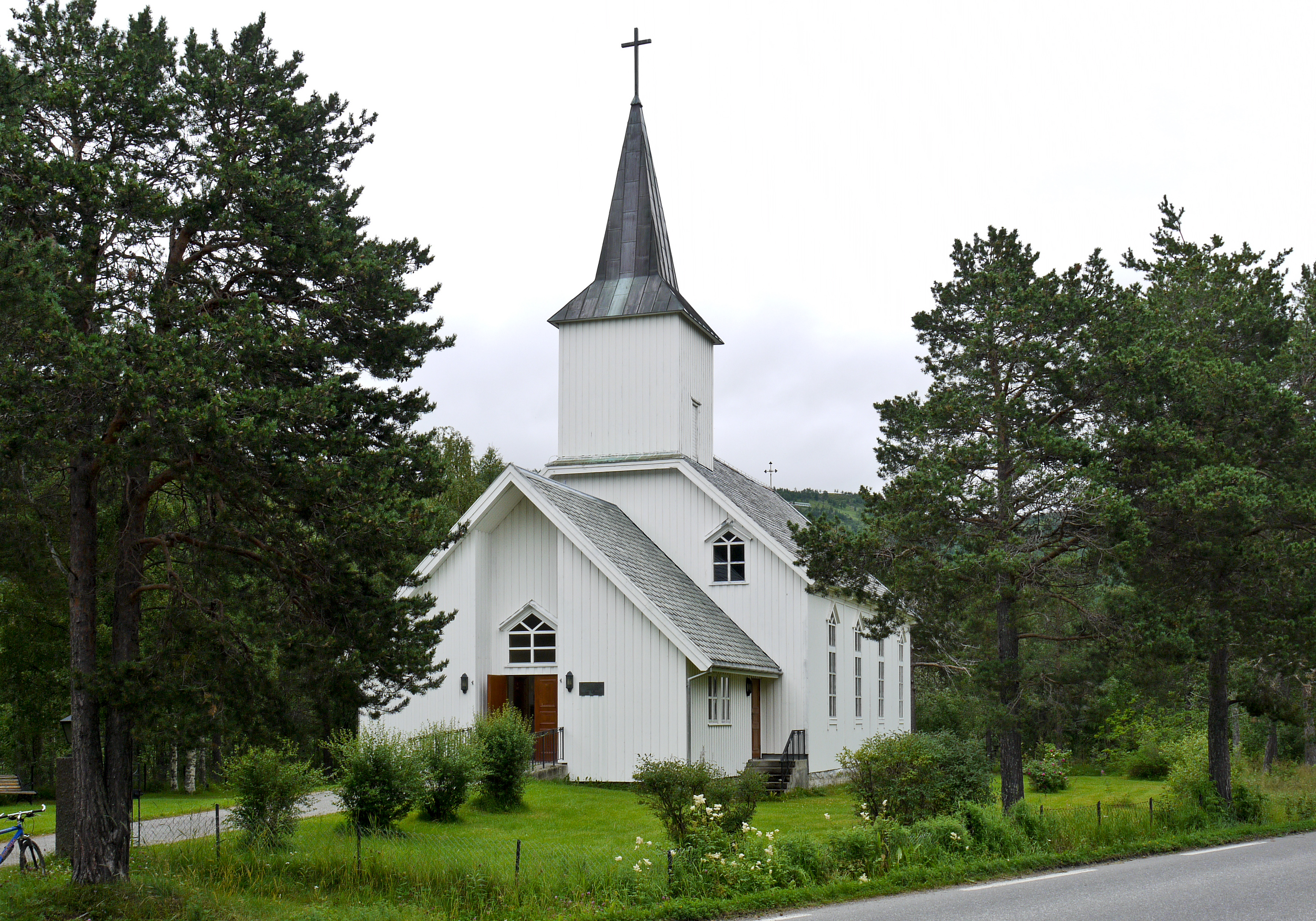
- View of the church
- Misvær Church
- 67.1202841°N 14.99621719°E
- Location: Bodø Municipality, Nordland
- Country: Norway
- Denomination: Church of Norway
- Churchmanship: Evangelical Lutheran

History
- Status: Parish church
- Consecrated: 31 October 1912

Architecture
- Functional status: Active
- Architect: O. M. Olsen
- Architectural type: Long church
- Completed: 1912 (114 years ago)

Specifications
- Capacity: 200
- Materials: Wood

Administration
- Diocese: Sør-Hålogaland
- Deanery: Bodø domprosti
- Parish: Misvær og Skjerstad
- Norwegian Cultural Heritage Site
- Type: Church
- Status: Not protected
- ID: 84949

Misvær Church (Norwegian: Misvær kirke) is a parish church of the Church of Norway in Bodø Municipality in Nordland county, Norway. It is located in the village of Misvær in the southern part of the municipality (in what used to be Skjerstad Municipality). It is one of two churches for the Misvær og Skjerstad parish which is part of the Bodø domprosti (deanery) in the Diocese of Sør-Hålogaland. The white, wooden church was built in a long church style in 1912 using plans drawn up by the architect O. M. Olsen. The church seats about 200 people.

== History ==
There was a medieval church located in Misvær on the same site. It was a small chapel that was used for church services mostly in the winters when the local residents couldn't travel to the larger Skjerstad Church when the Misværfjord was frozen. The church existed until 1720 when it was torn down and not replaced. In 1912, the new, present church was completed on the same site to serve the growing population in Misvær. The new building was consecrated on 31 October 1912.

== Media gallery ==
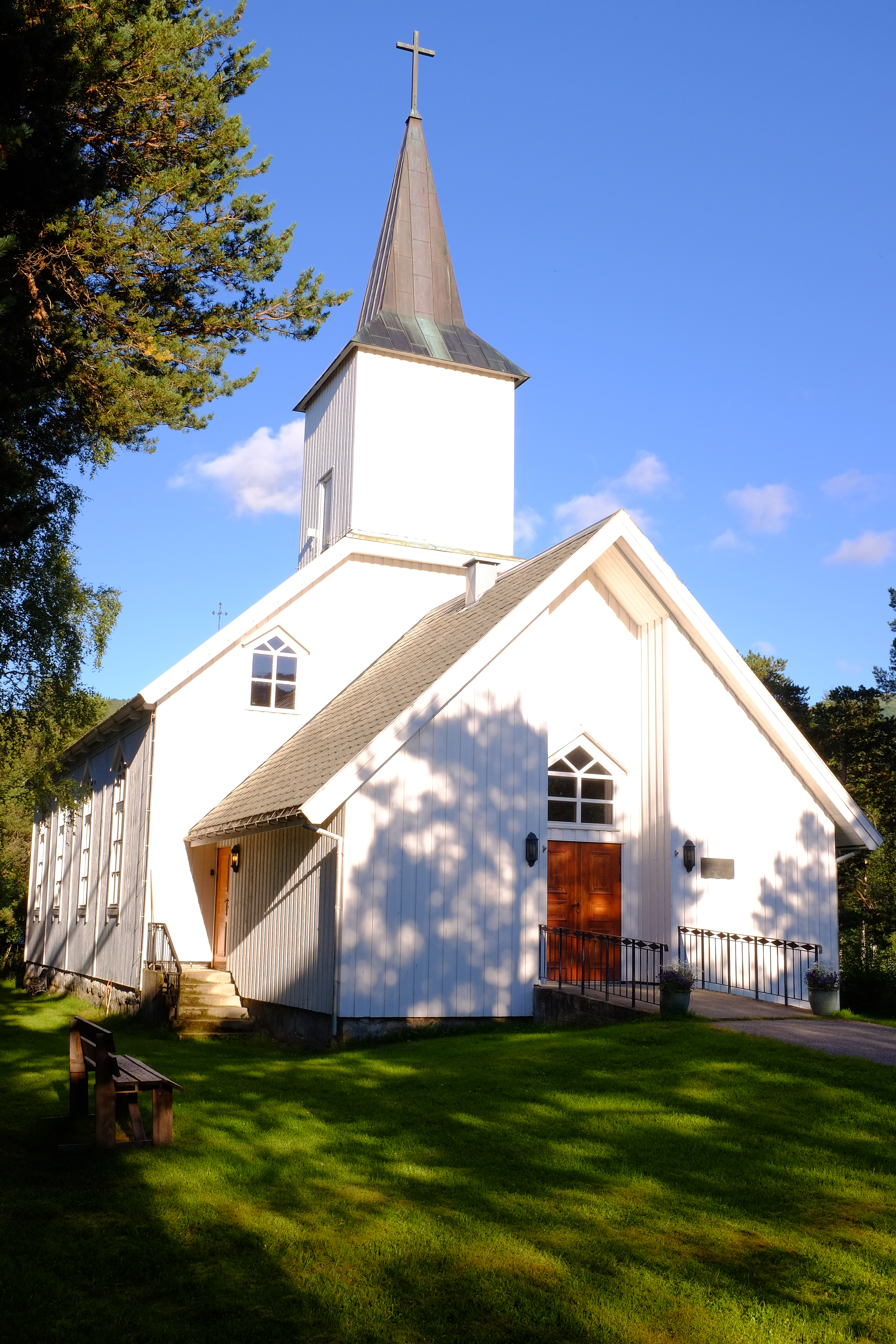

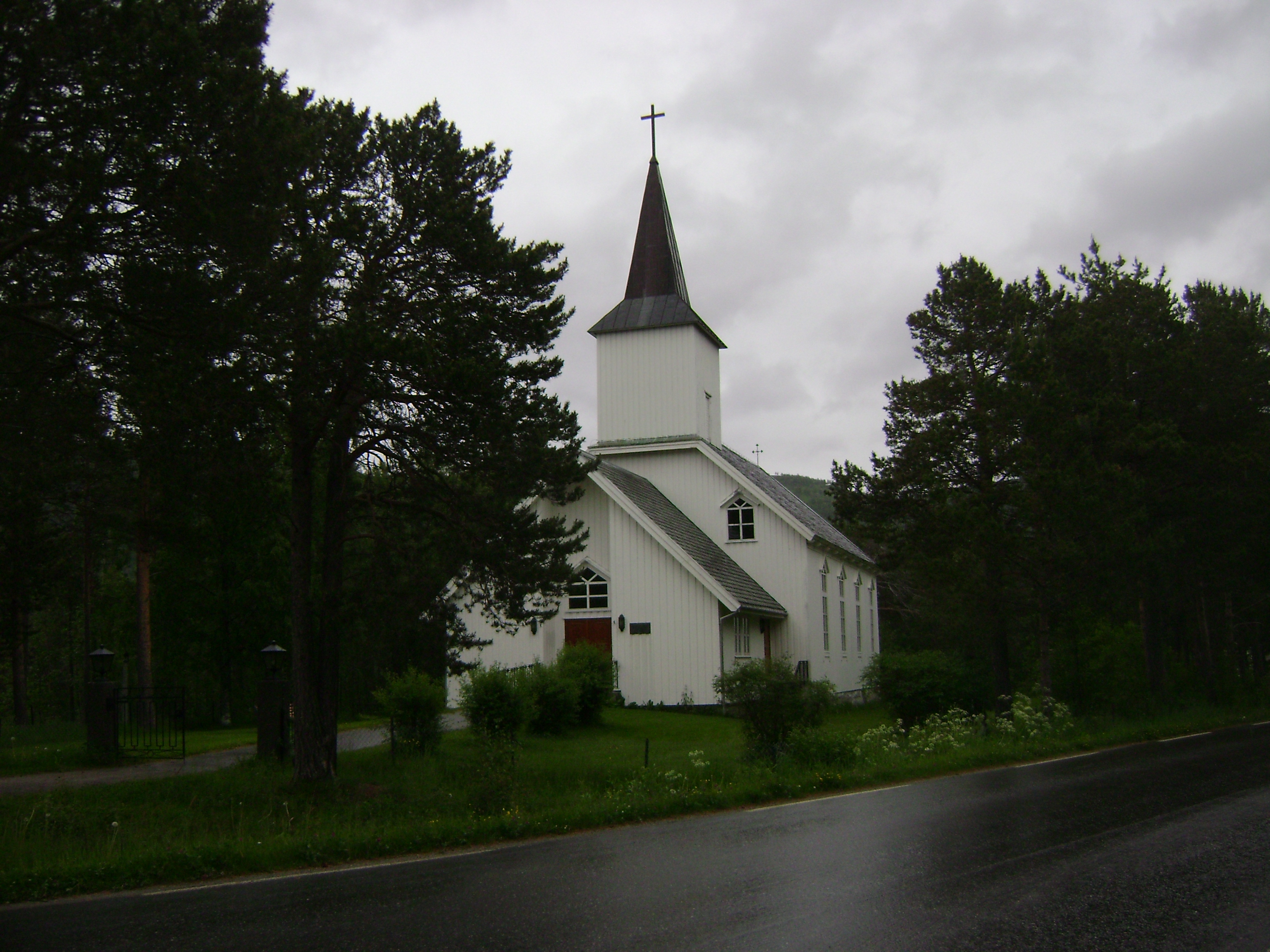

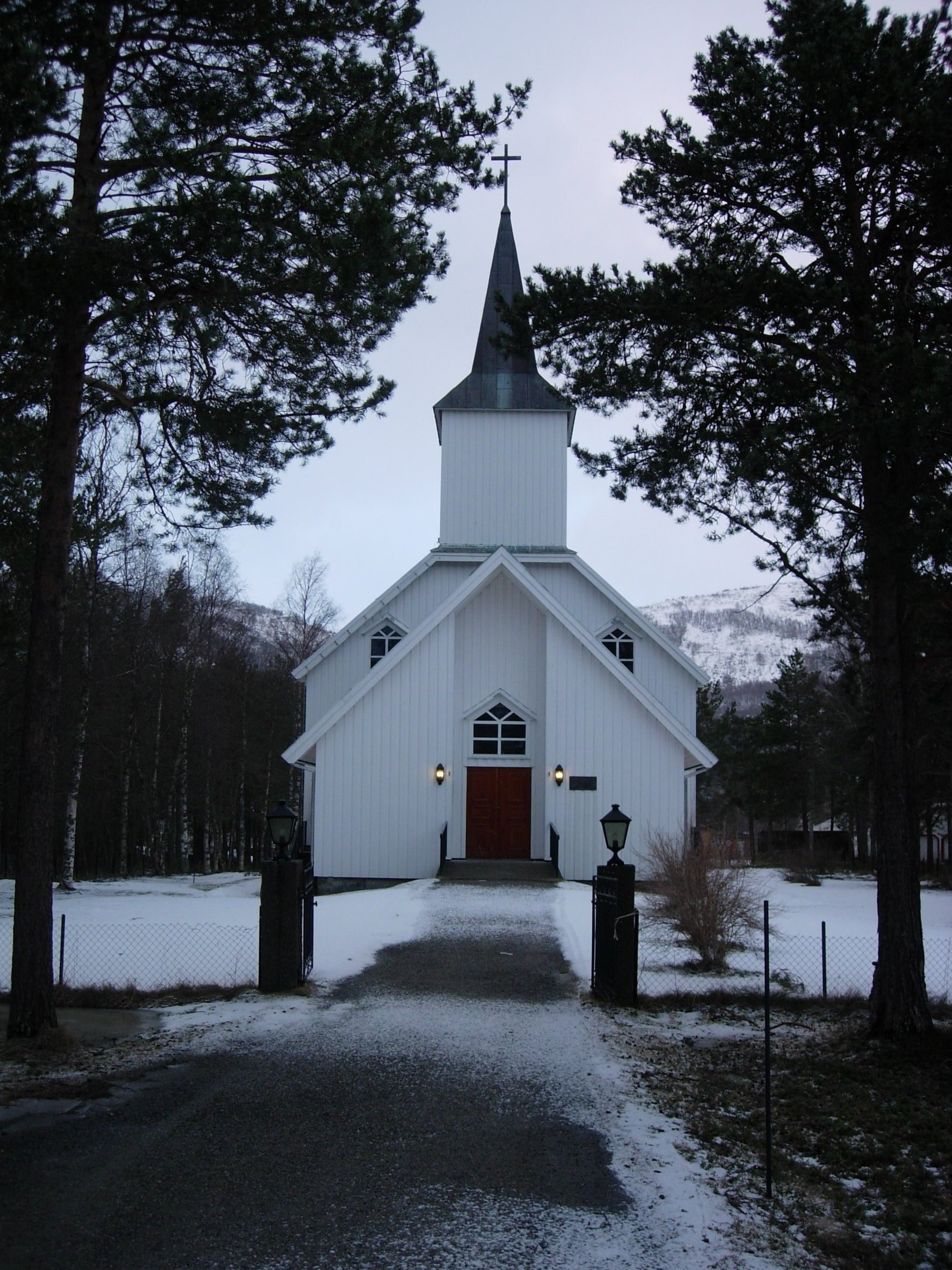

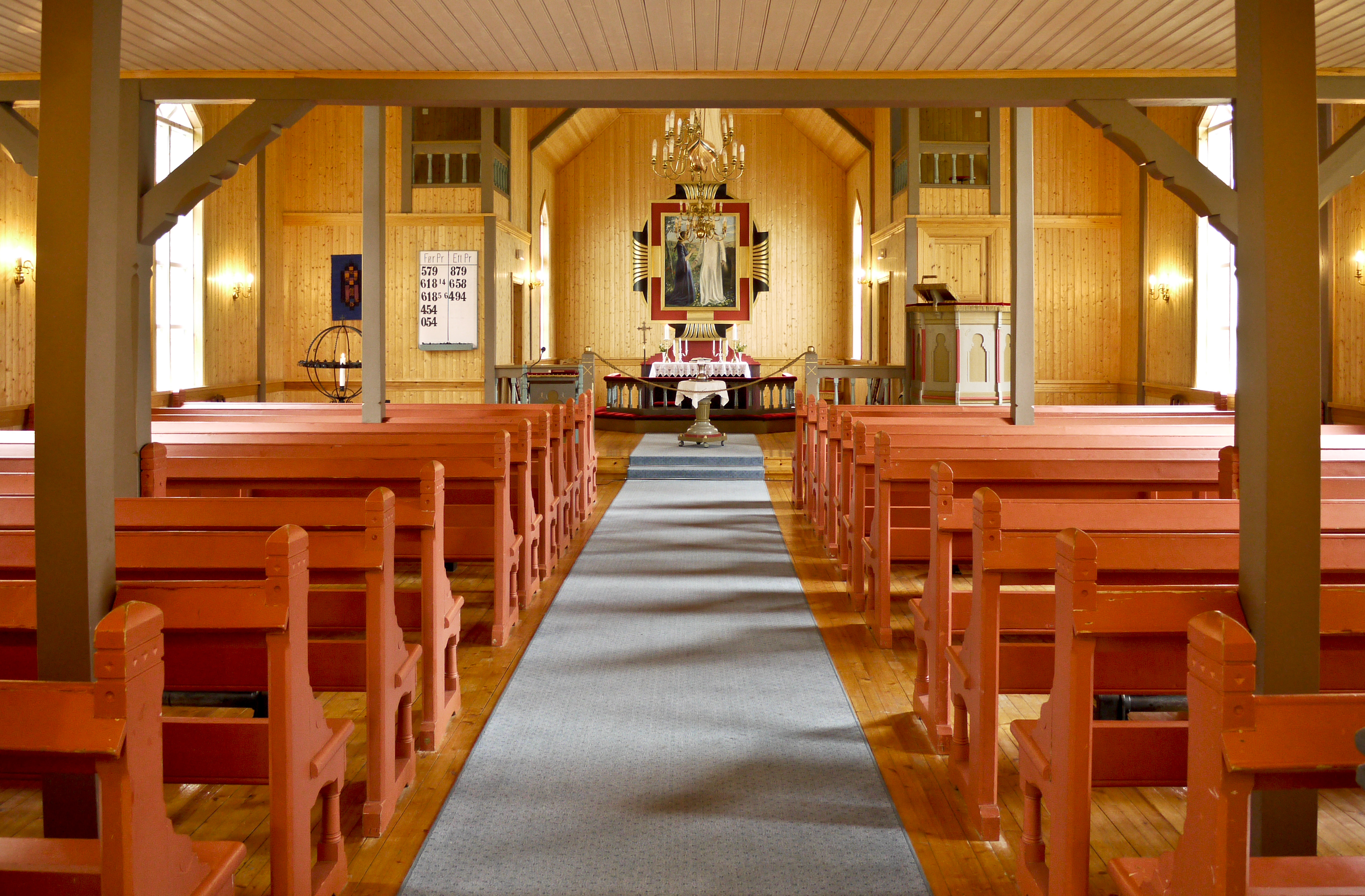

== See also ==
- List of churches in Sør-Hålogaland
