= Gudmund Grimstad =

Norwegian wrestler (1898–1970)

- Born: 8 April 1898; Skjerstad, Norway
- Died: 12 August 1970 (aged 72); San Pedro, California, United States

Gudmund Jarl Grimstad (8 April 1898 – 12 August 1970) was a Norwegian wrestler. He competed at the 1920 Summer Olympics in Antwerp where he placed fifth in freestyle middleweight. Grimstad was born in the village of Skjerstad in Nordland county.
