= Skjerstad =

Village in Bodø Municipality, Norway

Skjerstad (Norwegian); Skierrestáde (Lule Sami)
- Village
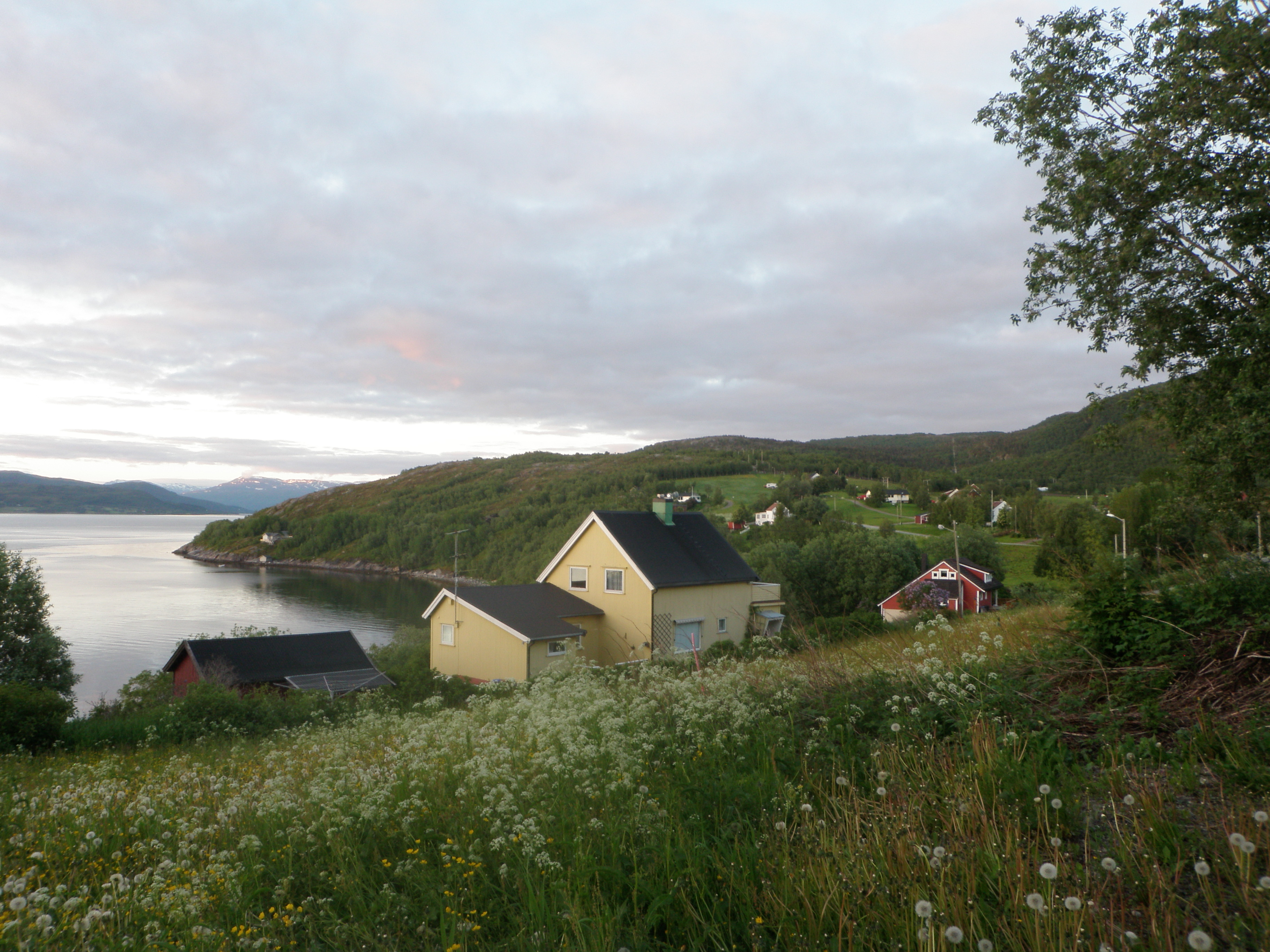
- View of the village
- Interactive map of: Skjerstad (Norwegian); Skierrestáde (Lule Sami)
- Location within Nordland Location within Norway
- Coordinates: 67.2331°N 15.0257°E
- Country: Norway
- Region: Northern Norway
- County: Nordland
- District: Salten
- Municipality: Bodø Municipality
- Elevation: 28 m (92 ft)
- Time zone: UTC+01:00 (CET)
  - Summer (DST): UTC+02:00 (CEST)
- Post Code: 8102 Skjerstad

Skjerstad (Norwegian; pronounced [ˈʂæ̀ːʂtɑ]) or Skierrestáde (Lule Sami) is a village in Bodø Municipality in Nordland county, Norway. The small village of Skjerstad sits at the mouth of the Misværfjorden, where it joins Skjerstadfjorden. The village is also the location of Skjerstad Church. The village was the namesake of the old Skjerstad Municipality which existed from 1838 until 2005.

== History ==
Skjerstad is possibly the place of execution of Norse chieftain Raud den Rame by King Olaf Tryggvason, and the location of the annual historical hoax play called "Ragnhilds Drøm" (transl. Ragnhild's Dream).

== Notable people ==
- Gudmund Grimstad, an Olympic wrestler (1898–1970)
