= Skjerstad Municipality =

Former municipality in Nordland, Norway

Skjerstad Municipality Skjerstad kommune
- Former municipality
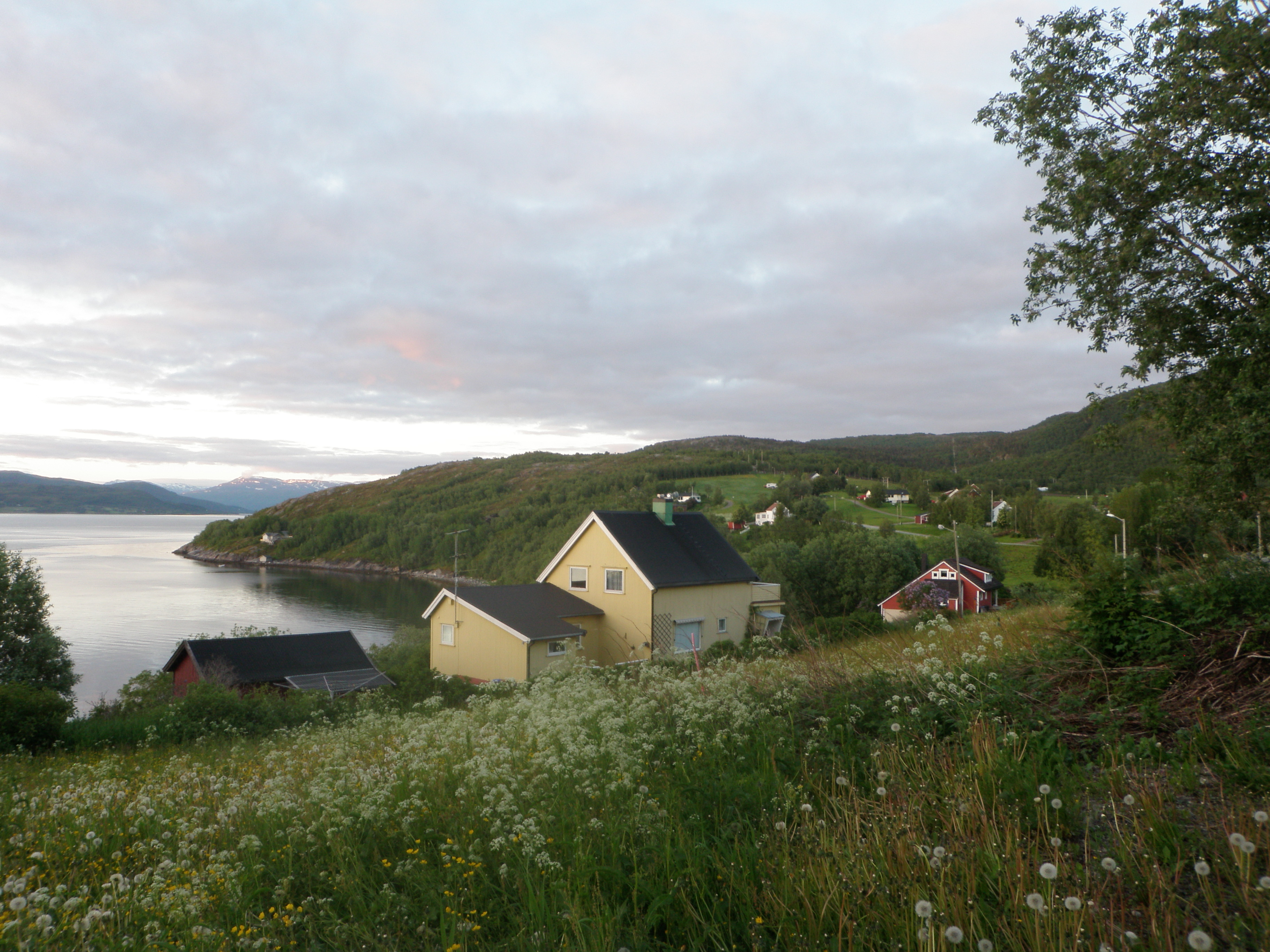
- The village of Skjerstad, viewed from Skjerstad Church

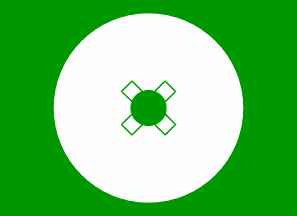
- Flag Coat of arms

- Nordland within Norway

- Skjerstad within Nordland
- Coordinates: 67.1170°N 15.0011°E
- Country: Norway
- County: Nordland
- District: Salten
- Established: 1 Jan 1838
  - Created as: Formannskapsdistrikt
- Disestablished: 1 Jan 2005
  - Succeeded by: Bodø Municipality
- Administrative centre: Misvær

Government
  - Mayor (2003–2005): Sissel Jakobsen (SV)

Area (upon dissolution)
  - Total: 465.4 km^{2} (179.7 sq mi)
  - Rank: #216 in Norway
- Highest elevation: 1,284.52 m (4,214.3 ft)

Population (2003)
  - Total: 1,030
  - Rank: #408 in Norway
  - Density: 2.2/km^{2} (5.7/sq mi)
  - Change (10 years): ▼ −15.8%
- Demonym: Skjerstadværing

Official language
  - Norwegian form: Bokmål
- Time zone: UTC+01:00 (CET)
  - Summer (DST): UTC+02:00 (CEST)
- ISO 3166 code: NO-1842

Skjerstad (Norwegian pronunciation: [ˈʂæ̀ːʂtɑ]) is a former municipality in Nordland county, Norway. The 465-square-kilometre (180 sq mi) municipality existed from 1838 until its dissolution in 2005. The area is now part of Bodø Municipality in the traditional district of Salten. The administrative centre was the village of Misvær. Another village in the municipality was the village of Skjerstad where Skjerstad Church was located. The municipality generally encompassed the area around the Misværfjorden, although it originally was much larger, also including the entire present-day Fauske Municipality.

Prior to its dissolution in 2005, the 465-square-kilometre (180 sq mi) municipality was the 216th largest by area out of the 434 municipalities in Norway. Skjerstad Municipality was the 408th most populous municipality in Norway with a population of about 1,030. The municipality's population density was 2.2 inhabitants per square kilometre (5.7/sq mi) and its population had decreased by 15.8% over the previous 10-year period.

== General information ==
The municipality of Skjerstad was established on 1 January 1838 (see formannskapsdistrikt law). On 1 January 1905, most of Skjerstad Municipality located on the north side of the Skjerstadfjorden (population: 4,646) was separated to form the new Fauske Municipality. In 1949, a small district of Skjerstad Municipality (population: 10) was transferred to neighboring Saltdal Municipality. During the 1960s, there were many municipal mergers across Norway due to the work of the Schei Committee. On 1 January 1963, the small area of Skjerstad Municipality on the north side of the fjord (population: 224) was transferred to neighboring Bodin Municipality. On 1 January 2005, Skjerstad Municipality was merged with Bodø Municipality to form a new, larger Bodø Municipality. Just prior to the merger (in 2004), the population of Skjerstad Municipality was 1,030.

=== Name ===
The municipality (originally the parish) is named after the old Skjerstad farm (Old Norse: Skírastaða) since the first Skjerstad Church was built there. The first element possibly comes from the old name for the local river skírr which means "pure" or "clear". The last element is staða which means "homestead" or "farm".

=== Coat of arms ===
The coat of arms was granted on 14 July 1991 and they were in use until 1 January 2005 when the municipality was dissolved. The official blazon is "Vert, a millstone argent" (Norwegian: I grønt en sølv kvernstein). This means the arms have a green field (background) and the charge is a millstone or grinding stone. The millstone has a tincture of argent which means it is commonly colored white, but if it is made out of metal, then silver is used. The millstone was chosen to symbolize all the large and small mills that existed in Skjerstad in the past. The arms were designed by Arvid Sveen.

=== Churches ===
The Church of Norway had one parish (sokn) within Skjerstad Municipality. At the time of the municipal dissolution, it was part of the Skjerstad prestegjeld and the Bodø domprosti (arch-deanery) in the Diocese of Sør-Hålogaland.

Churches in Skjerstad Municipality
Parish (sokn)	Church name	Location of the church	Year built
Skjerstad	Skjerstad Church	Skjerstad	1959
Skjerstad	Misvær Chapel	Misvær	1912

== Geography ==
The highest point in the municipality was the 1,284.52-metre (4,214.3 ft) tall mountain Lurfjelltinden, located on the border with Beiarn Municipality and Bodø Municipality. The municipality was located southeast of Bodø Municipality, southwest of Fauske Municipality, west of Saltdal Municipality, and northeast of Beiarn Municipality.

== Government ==
While it existed, Skjerstad Municipality was responsible for primary education (through 10th grade), outpatient health services, senior citizen services, welfare and other social services, zoning, economic development, and municipal roads and utilities. The municipality was governed by a municipal council of directly elected representatives. The mayor was indirectly elected by a vote of the municipal council. The municipality was under the jurisdiction of the Hålogaland Court of Appeal.

=== Municipal council ===
The municipal council (Kommunestyre) of Skjerstad Municipality was made up of 13 representatives that were elected to four-year terms. The tables below show the historical composition of the council by political party.

Skjerstad kommunestyre 2003–2004
Party name (in Norwegian)	Number of representatives
Labour Party (Arbeiderpartiet)	2
Christian Democratic Party (Kristelig Folkeparti)	1
Centre Party (Senterpartiet)	3
Socialist Left Party (Sosialistisk Venstreparti)	3
Skjerstad cross-party list (Skjerstad tverrpolitiske liste)	4
Total number of members:	13
Note: On 1 January 2005, Skjerstad Municipality became part of Bodø Municipality.

Skjerstad kommunestyre 1999–2003
Party name (in Norwegian)	Number of representatives
Labour Party (Arbeiderpartiet)	6
Christian Democratic Party (Kristelig Folkeparti)	2
Centre Party (Senterpartiet)	7
Socialist Left Party (Sosialistisk Venstreparti)	2
Total number of members:	17

Skjerstad kommunestyre 1995–1999
Party name (in Norwegian)	Number of representatives
Labour Party (Arbeiderpartiet)	4
Conservative Party (Høyre)	3
Christian Democratic Party (Kristelig Folkeparti)	1
Centre Party (Senterpartiet)	8
Socialist Left Party (Sosialistisk Venstreparti)	1
Total number of members:	17

Skjerstad kommunestyre 1991–1995
Party name (in Norwegian)	Number of representatives
Labour Party (Arbeiderpartiet)	8
Conservative Party (Høyre)	1
Christian Democratic Party (Kristelig Folkeparti)	1
Centre Party (Senterpartiet)	6
Socialist Left Party (Sosialistisk Venstreparti)	1
Total number of members:	17

Skjerstad kommunestyre 1987–1991
Party name (in Norwegian)	Number of representatives
Labour Party (Arbeiderpartiet)	9
Conservative Party (Høyre)	2
Christian Democratic Party (Kristelig Folkeparti)	1
Centre Party (Senterpartiet)	4
Vestersida and Misværbygda's cross-party list (Vestersida og Misværbygdas tverrpolitiske liste)	1
Total number of members:	17

Skjerstad kommunestyre 1983–1987
Party name (in Norwegian)	Number of representatives
Labour Party (Arbeiderpartiet)	9
Conservative Party (Høyre)	3
Christian Democratic Party (Kristelig Folkeparti)	1
Centre Party (Senterpartiet)	4
Total number of members:	17

Skjerstad kommunestyre 1979–1983
Party name (in Norwegian)	Number of representatives
Labour Party (Arbeiderpartiet)	5
Conservative Party (Høyre)	3
Christian Democratic Party (Kristelig Folkeparti)	2
Centre Party (Senterpartiet)	7
Total number of members:	17

Skjerstad kommunestyre 1975–1979
Party name (in Norwegian)	Number of representatives
Labour Party (Arbeiderpartiet)	4
Christian Democratic Party (Kristelig Folkeparti)	2
Ytterbygdenes Election list (Ytterbygdenes Valgliste)	2
Vestersia and Misværbygda List (Vestersia og Misværbygdas Liste)	9
Total number of members:	17

Skjerstad kommunestyre 1971–1975
Party name (in Norwegian)	Number of representatives
Labour Party (Arbeiderpartiet)	7
Christian Democratic Party (Kristelig Folkeparti)	2
Centre Party (Senterpartiet)	6
Local List(s) (Lokale lister)	2
Total number of members:	17

Skjerstad kommunestyre 1967–1971
Party name (in Norwegian)	Number of representatives
Labour Party (Arbeiderpartiet)	7
Christian Democratic Party (Kristelig Folkeparti)	2
Joint List(s) of Non-Socialist Parties (Borgerlige Felleslister)	6
Local List(s) (Lokale lister)	2
Total number of members:	17

Skjerstad kommunestyre 1963–1967
Party name (in Norwegian)	Number of representatives
Labour Party (Arbeiderpartiet)	8
Christian Democratic Party (Kristelig Folkeparti)	2
Joint List(s) of Non-Socialist Parties (Borgerlige Felleslister)	7
Total number of members:	17

Skjerstad herredsstyre 1959–1963
Party name (in Norwegian)	Number of representatives
Labour Party (Arbeiderpartiet)	8
Christian Democratic Party (Kristelig Folkeparti)	3
Joint List(s) of Non-Socialist Parties (Borgerlige Felleslister)	6
Total number of members:	17

Skjerstad herredsstyre 1955–1959
Party name (in Norwegian)	Number of representatives
Labour Party (Arbeiderpartiet)	8
Christian Democratic Party (Kristelig Folkeparti)	3
Joint List(s) of Non-Socialist Parties (Borgerlige Felleslister)	6
Total number of members:	17

Skjerstad herredsstyre 1951–1955
Party name (in Norwegian)	Number of representatives
Labour Party (Arbeiderpartiet)	8
Christian Democratic Party (Kristelig Folkeparti)	4
Joint List(s) of Non-Socialist Parties (Borgerlige Felleslister)	4
Total number of members:	16

Skjerstad herredsstyre 1947–1951
Party name (in Norwegian)	Number of representatives
Labour Party (Arbeiderpartiet)	7
Christian Democratic Party (Kristelig Folkeparti)	4
Joint List(s) of Non-Socialist Parties (Borgerlige Felleslister)	5
Total number of members:	16

Skjerstad herredsstyre 1945–1947
Party name (in Norwegian)	Number of representatives
Labour Party (Arbeiderpartiet)	8
Christian Democratic Party (Kristelig Folkeparti)	3
Joint List(s) of Non-Socialist Parties (Borgerlige Felleslister)	3
Local List(s) (Lokale lister)	2
Total number of members:	16

Skjerstad herredsstyre 1937–1941*
Party name (in Norwegian)	Number of representatives
Labour Party (Arbeiderpartiet)	6
Joint List(s) of Non-Socialist Parties (Borgerlige Felleslister)	8
Local List(s) (Lokale lister)	2
Total number of members:	16
Note: Due to the German occupation of Norway during World War II, no elections were held for new municipal councils until after the war ended in 1945.

=== Mayors ===
The mayor (Norwegian: ordfører) of Skjerstad Municipality was the political leader of the municipality and the chairperson of the municipal council. Here is a list of people who held this position:

- 1838–1842: Johan Fredrik Lampe
- 1842–1844: Carl Berg
- 1844–1848: Nils Jønsberg
- 1848–1851: Carl Berg
- 1851–1852: Johan Normann
- 1852–1856: Nils Jønsberg
- 1856–1856: Johan P. Schjelderup
- 1856–1860: Marcus Randers
- 1861–1862: Bernhard Koch
- 1863–1866: Wilhelm Sandberg
- 1867–1868: Bernhard Koch
- 1869–1870: Christian Evjenth
- 1871–1872: Bernhard Koch
- 1873–1874: Jens Johannesen
- 1875–1878: Ulrik Neumann
- 1879–1880: Hans Hansen
- 1881–1886: Bernhard Koch
- 1887–1892: Johan Jørgensen
- 1893–1901: Olaf Amundsen
- 1901–1904: Johan Jørgensen
- 1905–1913: Johan Olsen
- 1914–1931: Sofus Thoresen
- 1932–1934: Ivar Sjaastad
- 1935–1941: Isak Naurstad
- 1941–1945: Thoralf Thoresen
- 1945–1951: Isak Naurstad
- 1952–1955: Julius Breivik
- 1955–1959: Sigurd Sandåker
- 1960–1963: Karsten Thoresen (Ap)
- 1964–1967: Otto Moeng (Sp)
- 1968–1971: Harald Dankertsen
- 1972–1975: Karsten Thoresen (Ap)
- 1976–1979: Aasmund Brekke (Sp)
- 1980–1984: Otto Moeng (Sp)
- 1984–1996: Fredrik Støvset (Ap)
- 1996–2003: Sven-Åke Hagen (Sp)
- 2003–2005: Sissel Jakobsen (SV)

== See also ==
- List of former municipalities of Norway
