= Misvær =

Village in Bodø Municipality, Norway

Misvær: Misvær (Norwegian); Medasværdda (Lule Sami)
- Village
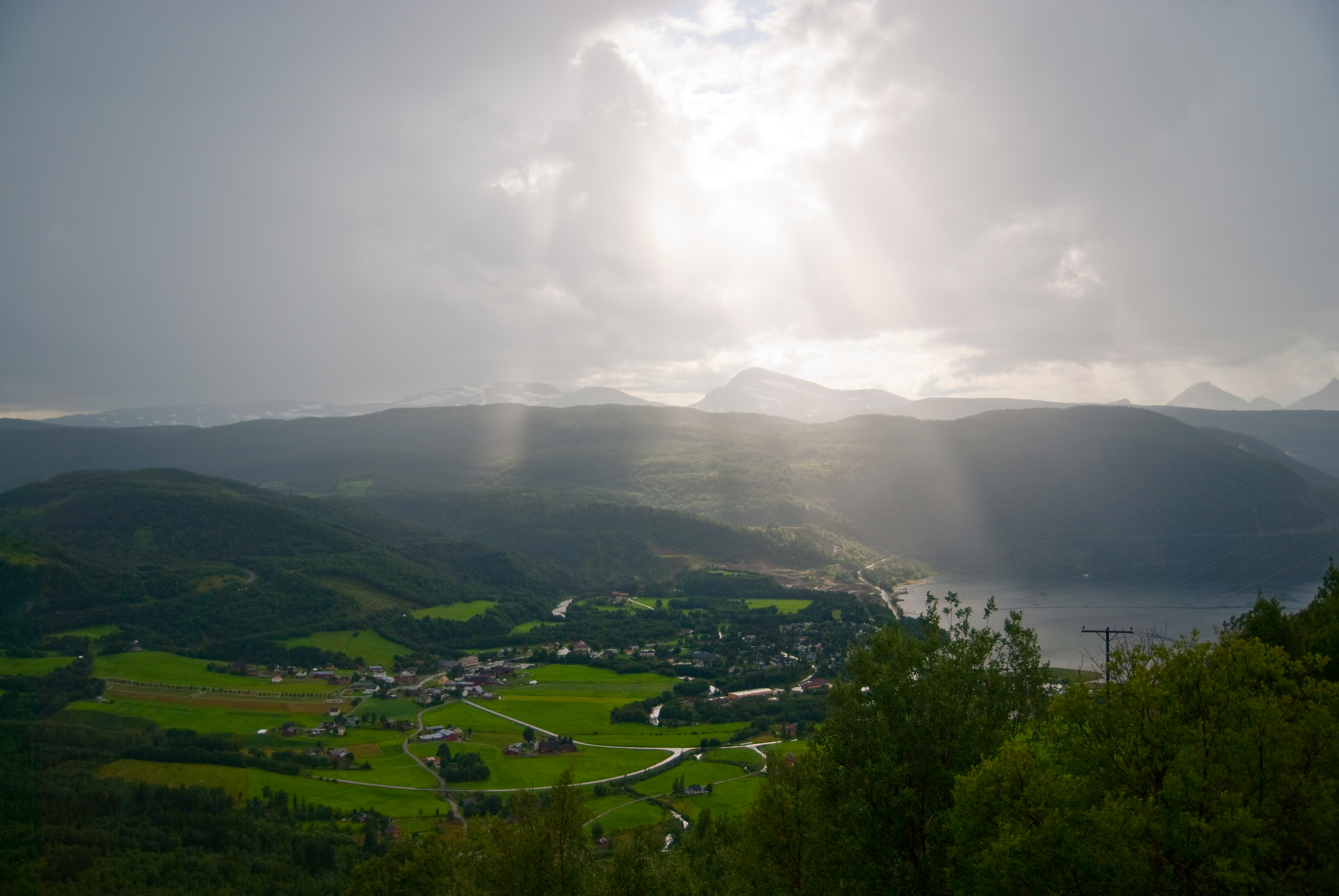
- View of the village
- Interactive map of Misvær
- Location within Nordland Location within Norway
- Coordinates: 67.1187°N 14.9992°E
- Country: Norway
- Region: Northern Norway
- County: Nordland
- District: Salten
- Municipality: Bodø Municipality

Area
  - Total: 0.35 km^{2} (0.14 sq mi)
- Elevation: 12 m (39 ft)

Population (2015)
  - Total: 245
  - Density: 700/km^{2} (1,800/sq mi)
- Time zone: UTC+01:00 (CET)
  - Summer (DST): UTC+02:00 (CEST)
- Post Code: 8100 Misvær
- Website: www.misvær.no

Misvær (Norwegian) or Medasværdda (Lule Sami) is a village in Bodø Municipality in Nordland county, Norway. It is located at the end of the Misværfjorden, about 40 kilometres (25 mi) southeast of the town of Bodø in the Skjerstad district of the municipality.

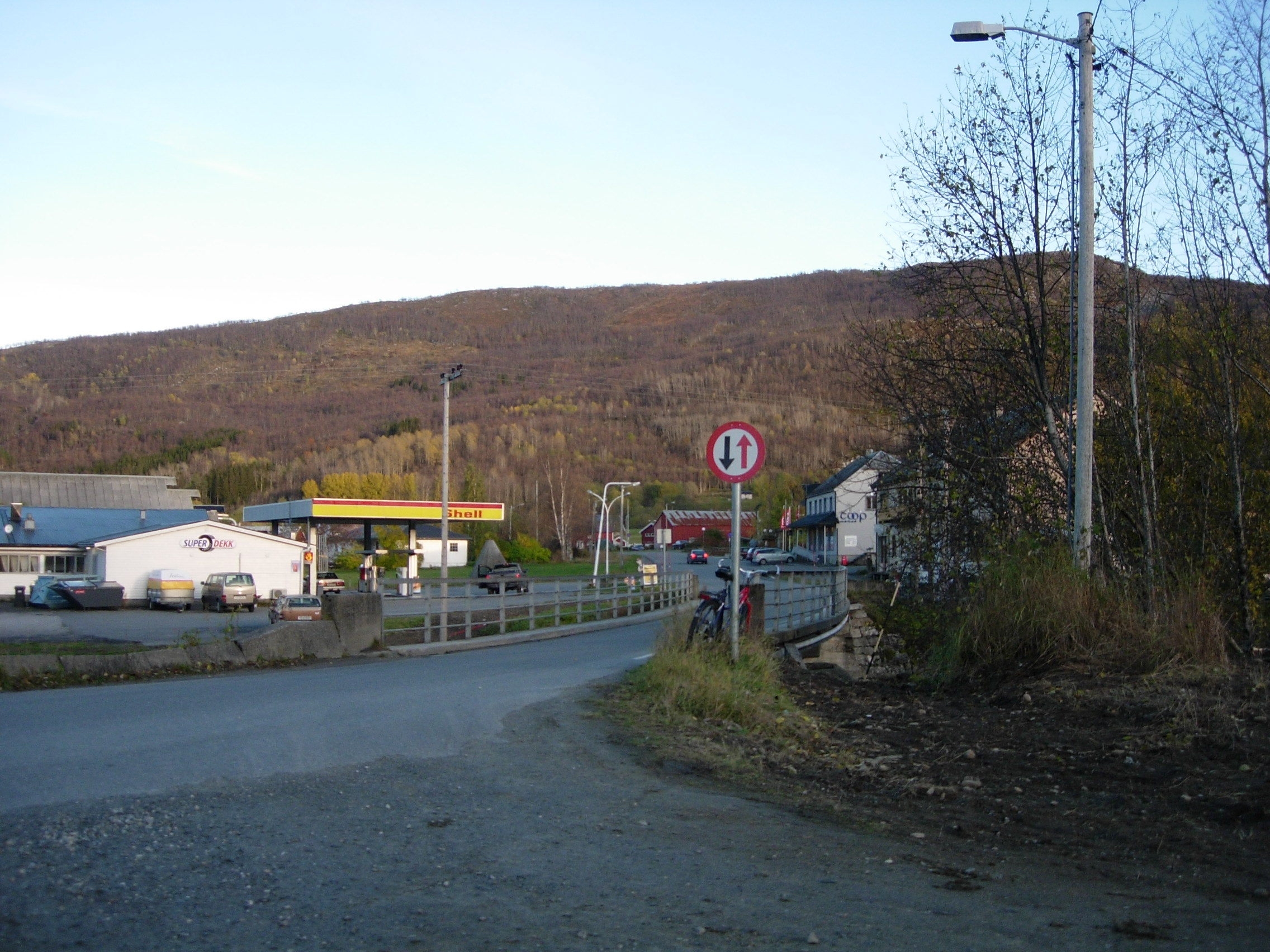
The centre of Misvær in March 2006.

The 0.35-square-kilometre (86-acre) village had a population (2015) of 245 and a population density of 700 inhabitants per square kilometre (1,800/sq mi). Since 2015, the population and area data for this village area has not been separately tracked by Statistics Norway.

Misvær was the administrative centre of the old Skjerstad Municipality. Misvær Church is located in the village. The Oldereid Hydroelectric Power Station, which draws water from the watercourses of the Oldereid and Skred rivers, stands northwest of Misvær.

Misvær has its own weather station where accurate weather conditions are updated every 10 minutes. Historical weather data from the village is also available.
