= Skjerstad Church =

Church in Nordland, Norway

- Skjerstad kirke
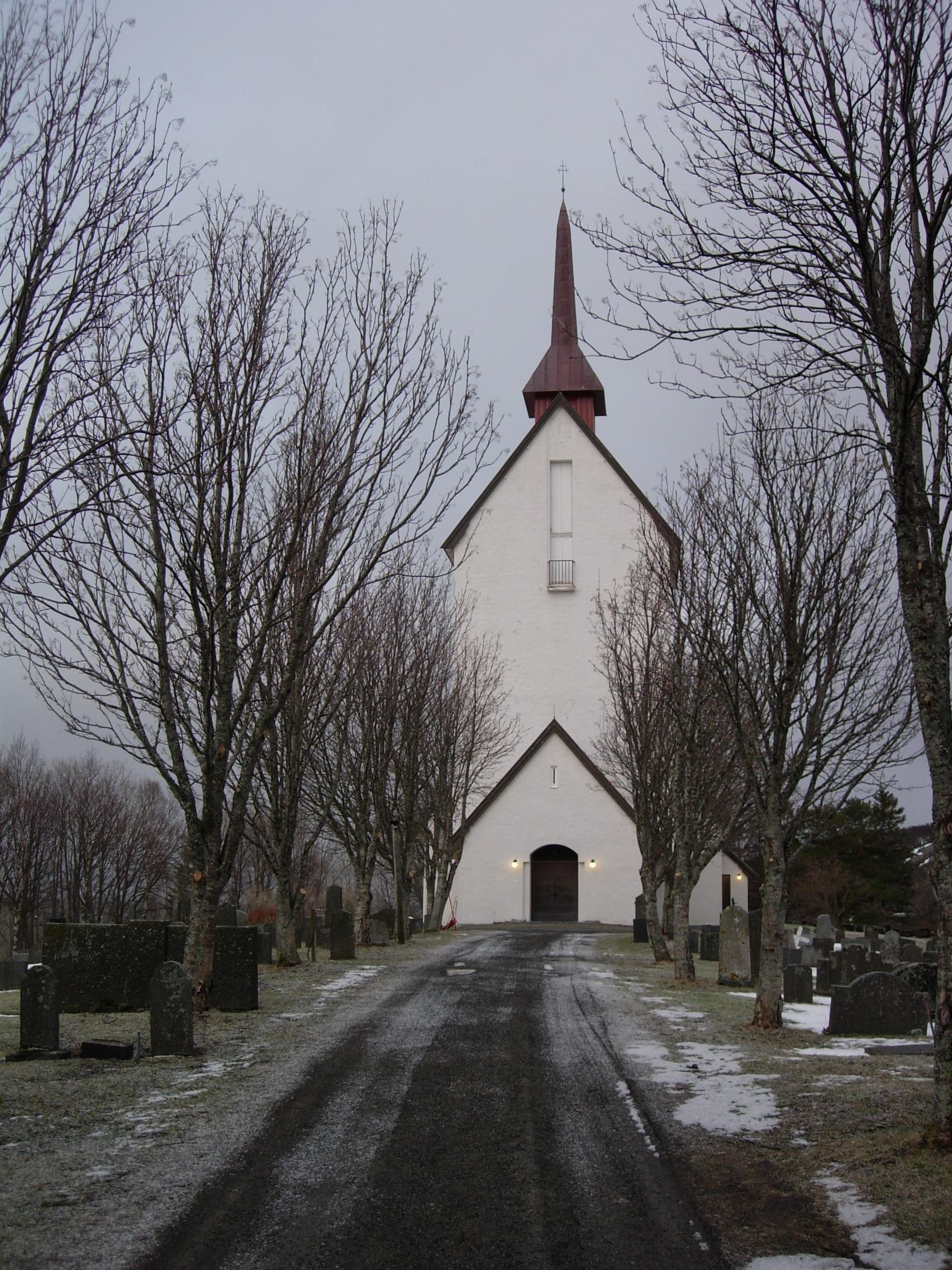
- View of the church
- Skjerstad Church
- 67.23427034°N 15.0210598°E
- Location: Bodø Municipality, Nordland
- Country: Norway
- Denomination: Church of Norway
- Churchmanship: Evangelical Lutheran

History
- Status: Parish church
- Founded: 12th century
- Consecrated: 1959
- Events: Fire: 17 May 1955

Architecture
- Functional status: Active
- Architect: Arnstein Arneberg
- Architectural type: Long church
- Completed: 1959 (67 years ago)

Specifications
- Capacity: 500
- Materials: Stone and concrete

Administration
- Diocese: Sør-Hålogaland
- Deanery: Bodø domprosti
- Parish: Misvær og Skjerstad
- Norwegian Cultural Heritage Site
- Type: Church
- Status: Not protected
- ID: 85461

Skjerstad Church (Norwegian: Skjerstad kirke) is a parish church of the Church of Norway in Bodø Municipality in Nordland county, Norway. It is located in the village of Skjerstad, along Skjerstadfjorden. It is one of two churches for the Misvær og Skjerstad parish which is part of the Bodø domprosti (deanery) in the Diocese of Sør-Hålogaland. The white, stone and concrete church was built in a long church style in 1959 using plans drawn up by the architect Arnstein Arneberg. The church seats about 500 people.

== History ==
The earliest existing historical records of the church in Skjerstad date back to the year 1390, but the church was not new that year. No descriptions of the church building from that time remain, but it was located about 350 metres (1,150 ft) southeast of the present church site. In 1633, a new wooden cruciform church was completed on the same site as the previous church that had just been torn down. By the 1750s, the church had been repaired several times and was no longer in good condition. It was decided to build a new church. Parish leaders chose a new site for the church, about 350 metres (1,150 ft) northwest of the old church site. The new church was completed in 1759. It was a timber-framed cruciform building with a sacristy next to the chancel on the east end, an entry porch on the west end, and a small tower on the roof above the nave.

In 1814, this church served as an election church (Norwegian: valgkirke). Together with more than 300 other parish churches across Norway, it was a polling station for elections to the 1814 Norwegian Constituent Assembly which wrote the Constitution of Norway. This was Norway's first national elections. Each church parish was a constituency that elected people called "electors" who later met together in each county to elect the representatives for the assembly that was to meet at Eidsvoll Manor later that year.

In 1848, the old church was torn down and replaced with a new building on the same site using plans by the architect Hans Linstow. This new building, unfortunately, burned down on 18 February 1873. A new, larger church to replace it was completed in 1877 using plans by the architect Håkon Mosling. This new building had a long church design instead of the cruciform design of previous buildings. It was consecrated on 31 October 1877. This building was destroyed by fire on 17 May 1955. The present church building was completed in 1959.

== Media gallery ==
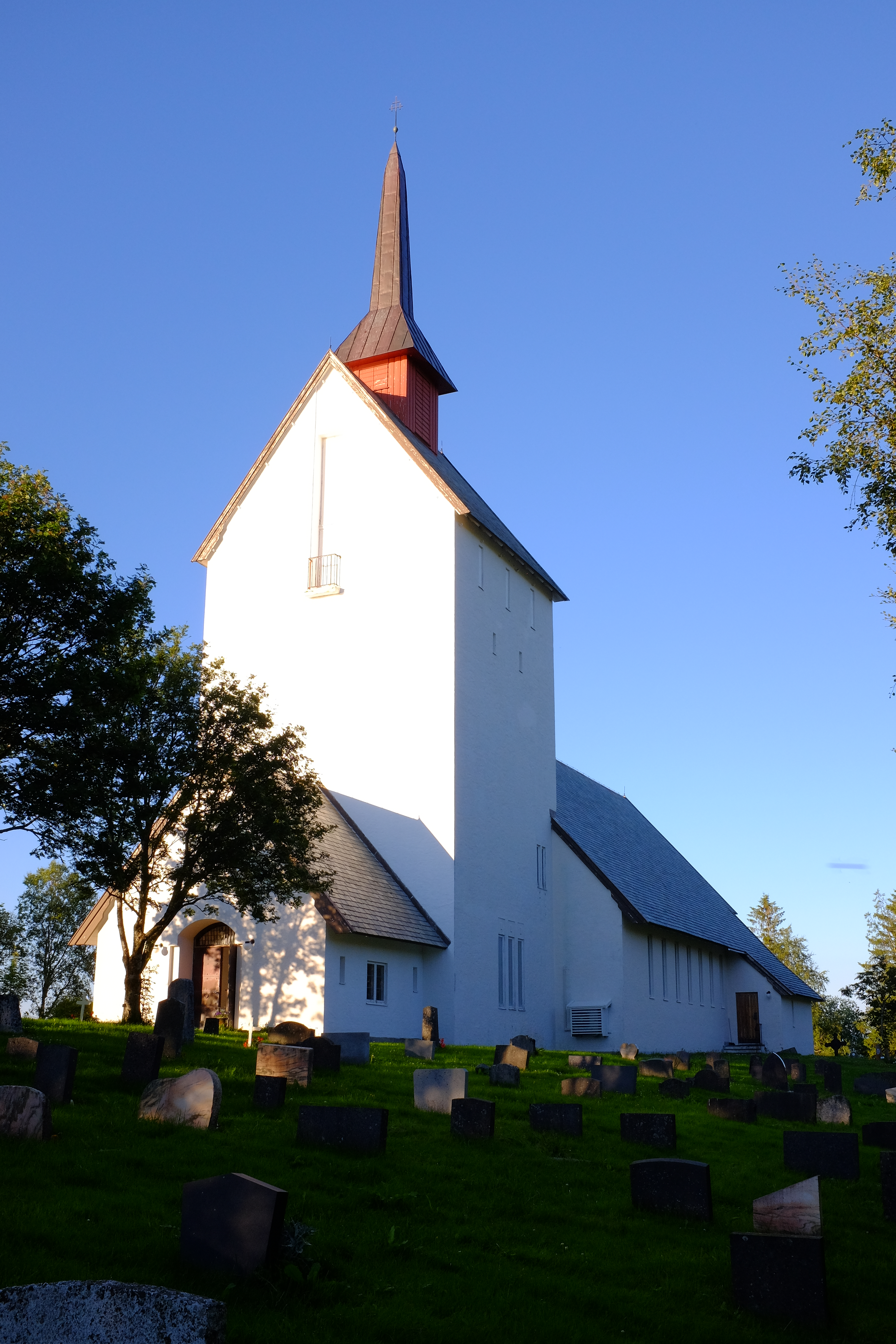

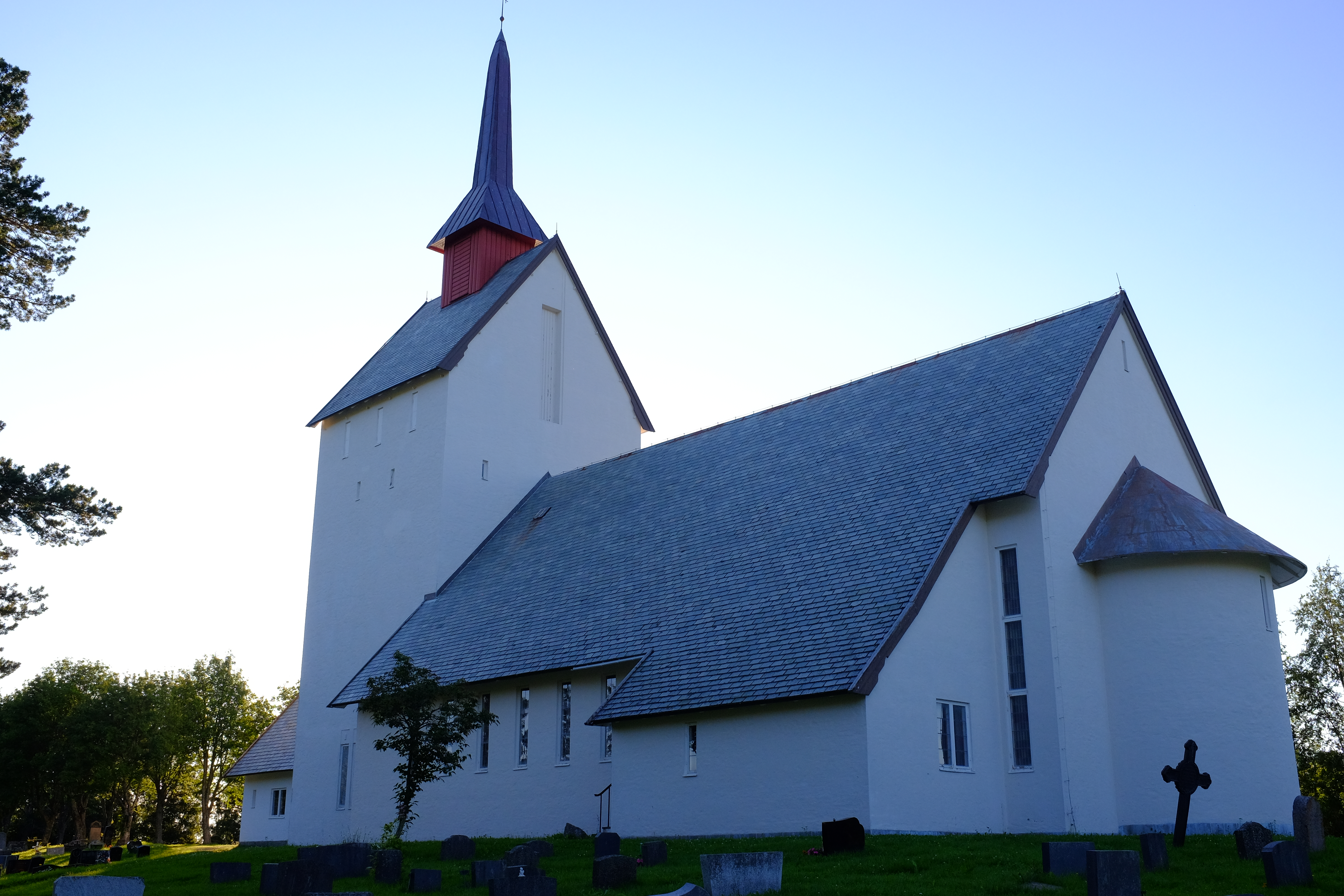

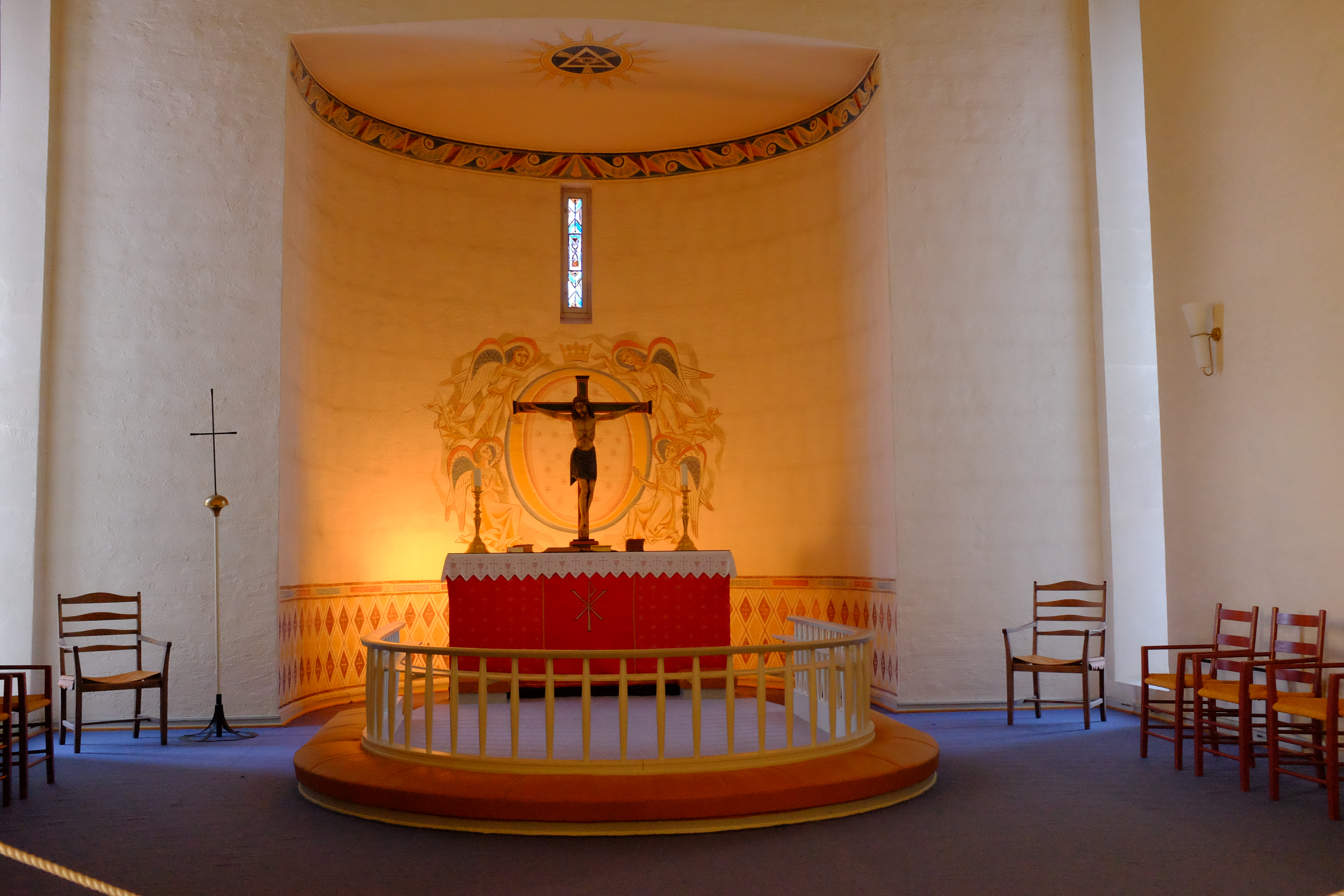

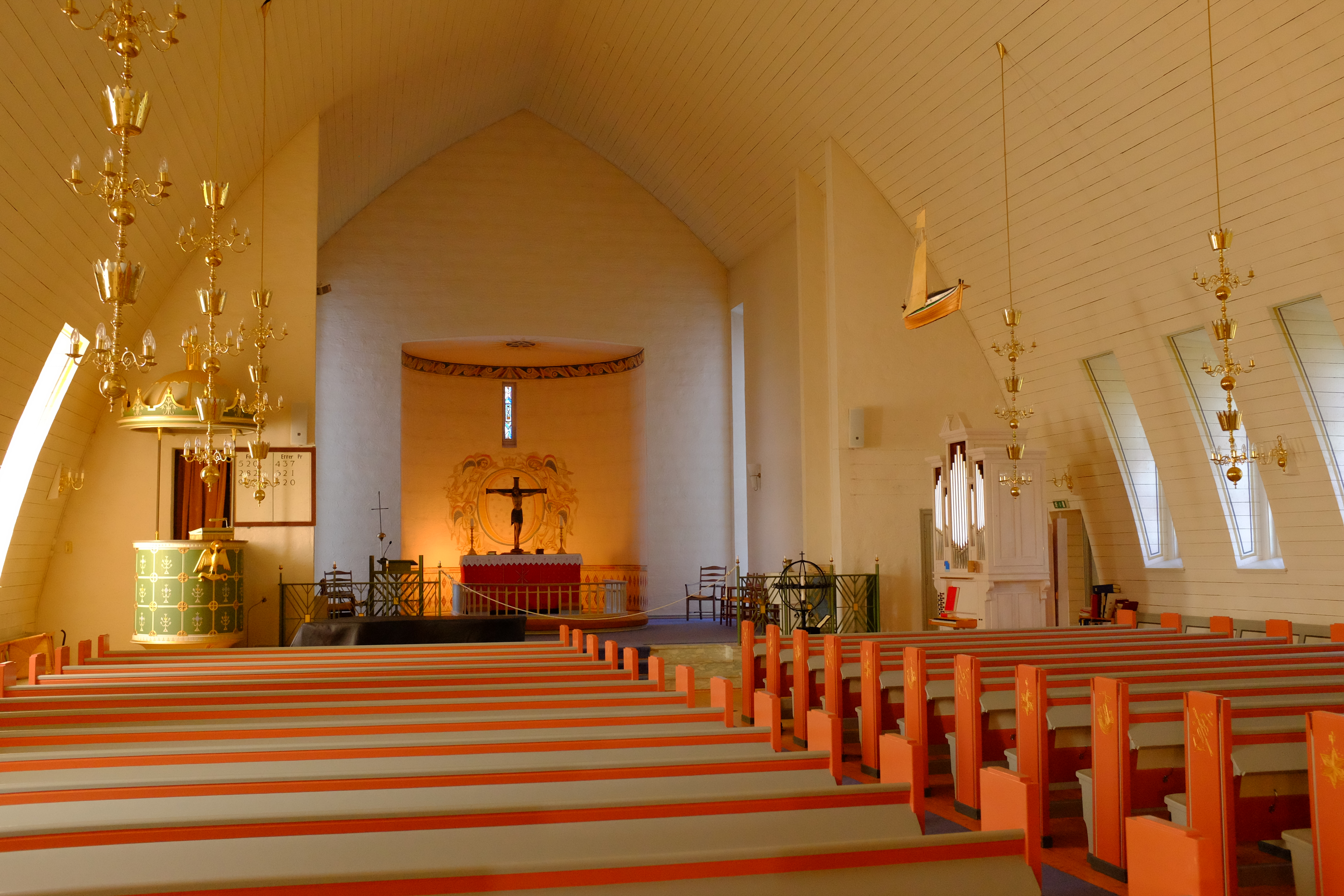

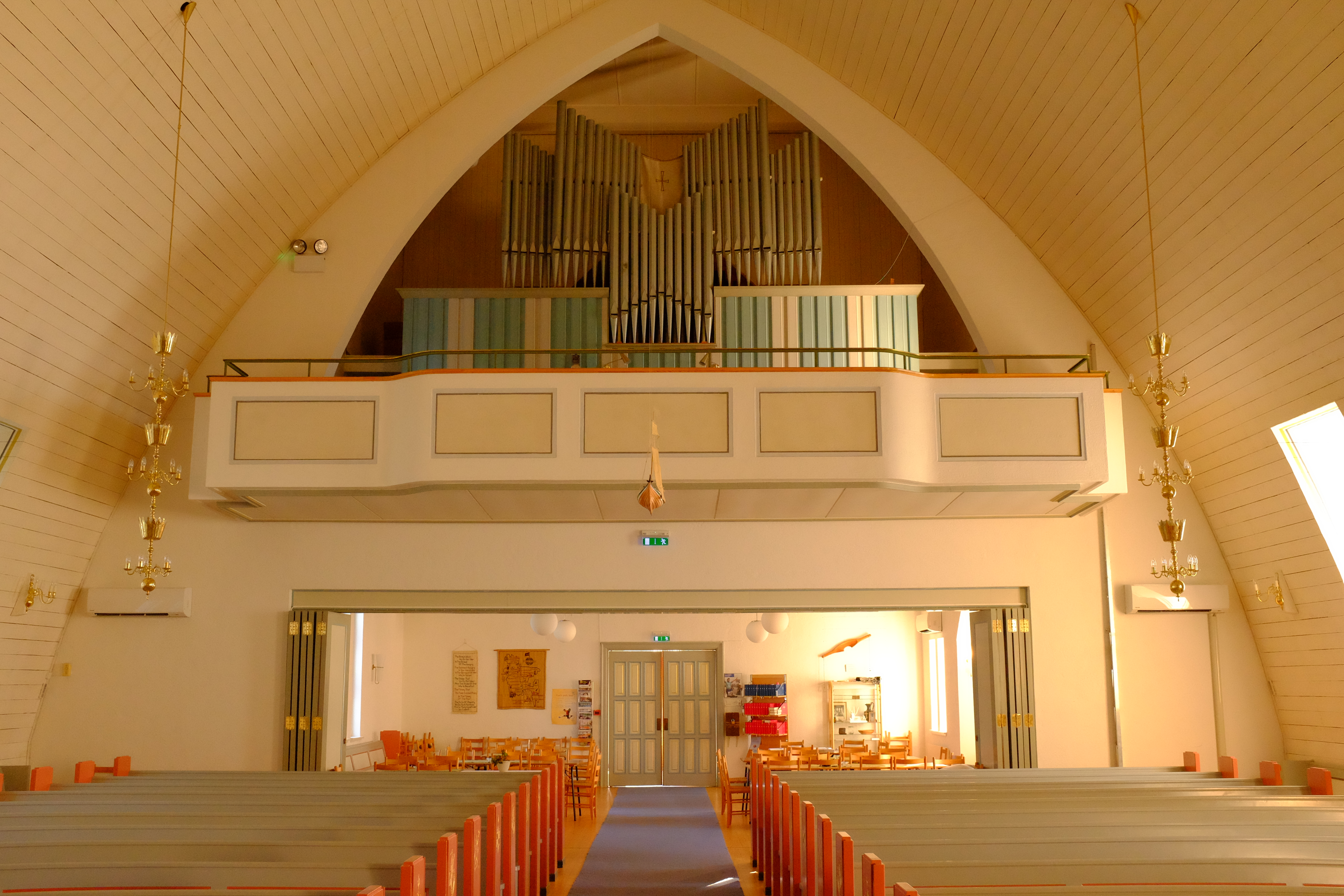

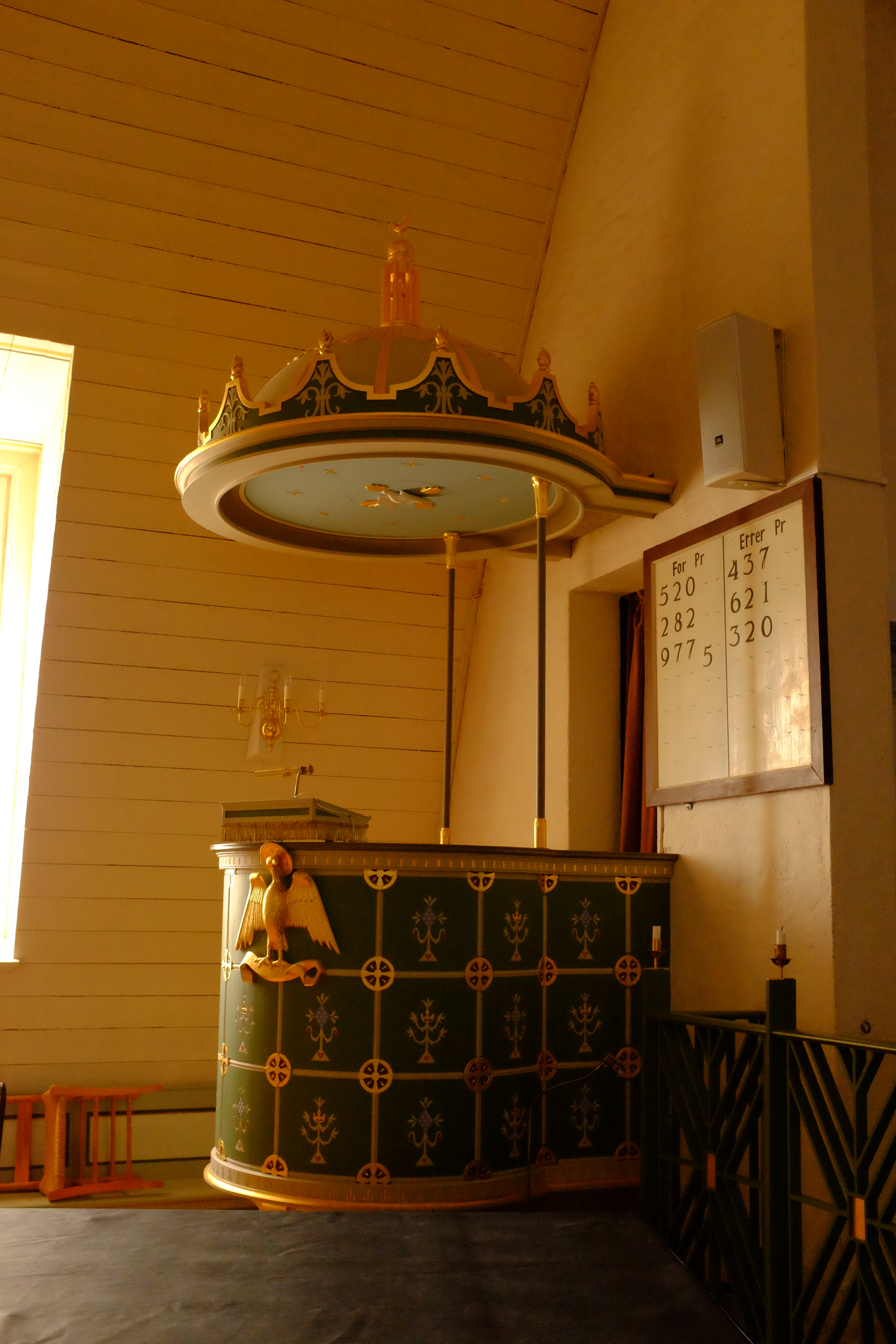

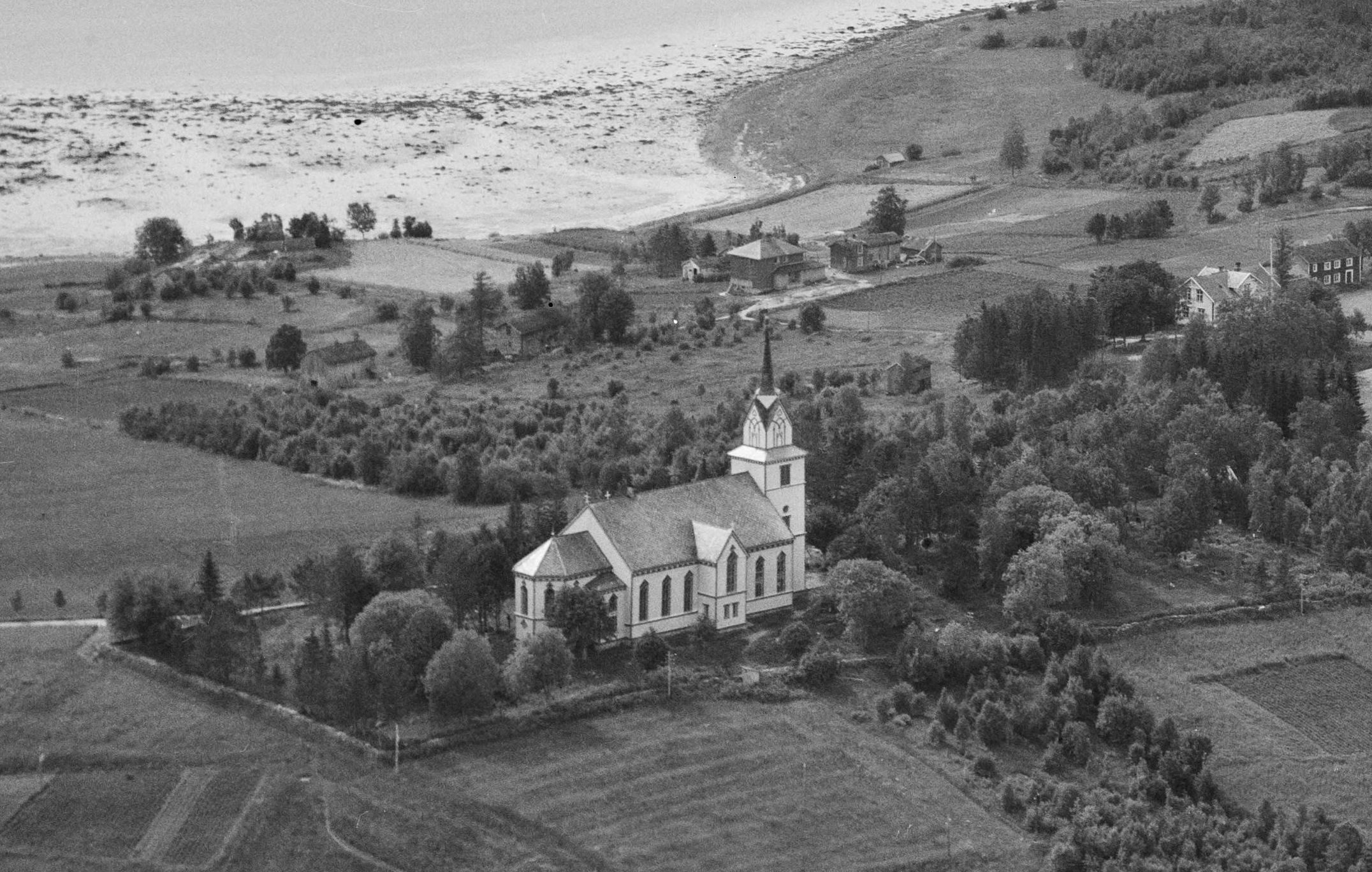
Old Skjerstad Church (1877-1955)

== See also ==
- List of churches in Sør-Hålogaland
