= Skjerstad Kraftlag =

Norwegian power company

Skjerstad Kraftlag A/L
- Industry: Power
- Founded: 2 March 1947
- Defunct: 19 November 2005
- Fate: Purchase
- Successor: BDF-Energi
- Headquarters: Skjerstad, Norway
- Products: Electricity

Skjerstad Kraftlag was a power company that operated in the former municipality of Skjerstad, Norway with about 1,000 subscribers. It was owned by the municipality.

== History ==
The company was established on 2 March 1947, though signings for shares had been done since 1943. When the municipality of Skjerstad was merged with Bodø on 1 January 2005 an agreement to sell the power company was made, and on 19 November 2005 the company BDF-Energi, owned by Bodø Energi (74%) and Fauske Lysverk (26%) bought the company for NOK 125 million. The purchase was strategically important to have control over a 3.3% stake in Salten Kraftsamband.
