= Daja Hydroelectric Power Station =

Daja Power Station
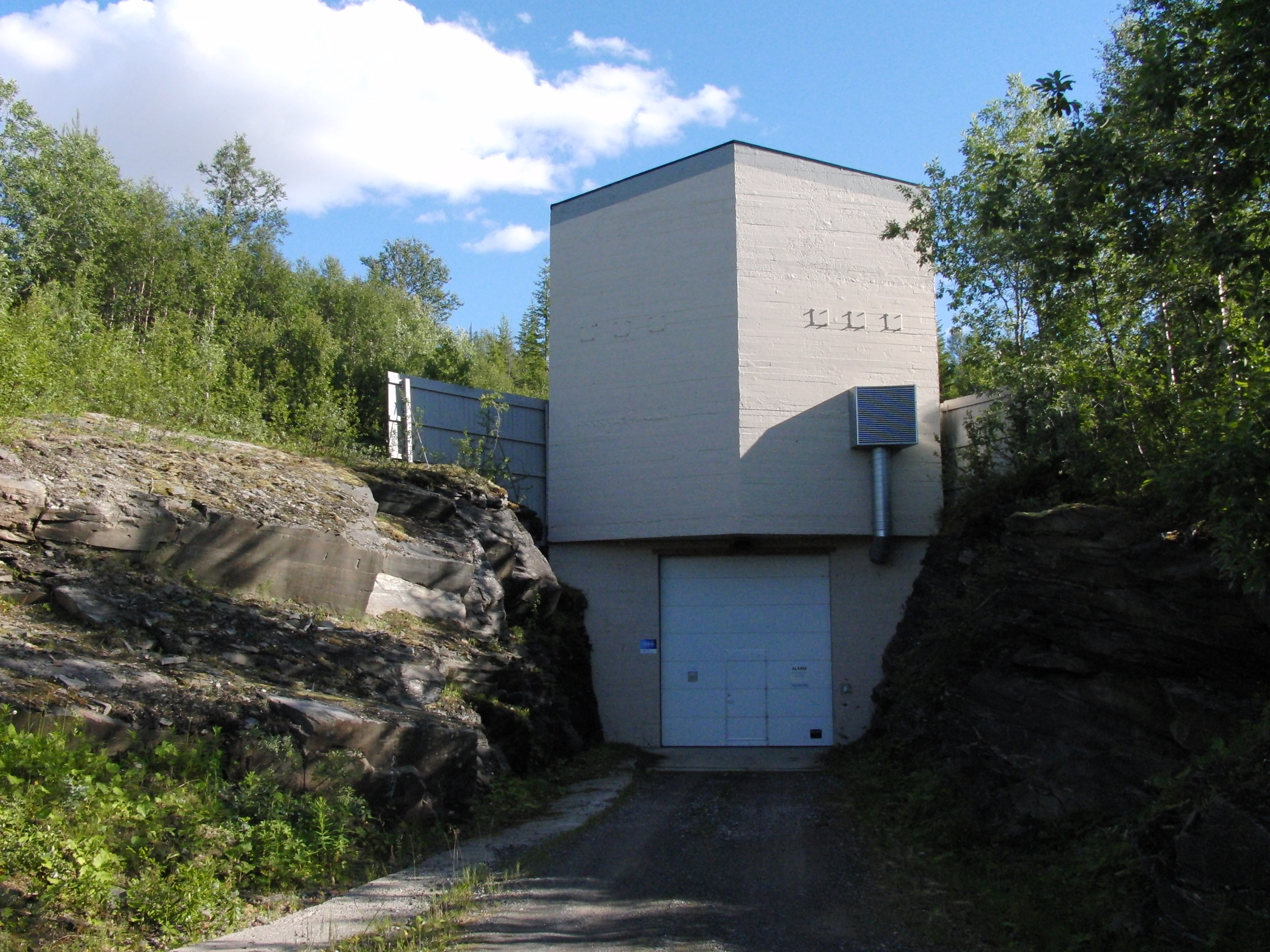
- Official name: Daja kraftverk
- Country: Norway
- Location: Fauske Municipality, Nordland
- Coordinates: 67°05′18″N 16°03′25″E
- Status: Operational
- Opening date: 1958; 67 years ago
- Owner(s): Salten Kraftsamband

Power Station
- Hydraulic head: 151 m
- Installed capacity: 30 MW
- Capacity factor: 59.7%
- Annual generation: 157 GW·h

The Daja Hydroelectric Power Station (Norwegian: Daja kraftverk or Daja kraftstasjon) is a hydroelectric power station in Fauske Municipality in Nordland county, Norway. It is located about 2.3 kilometers (1.4 mi) east-southeast of Jakobsbakken.

The plant utilizes a drop of 151 meters (495 ft) in the Balmi River between two lakes: Kjelvatnet (Lule Sami: Giebbnejávrre or Giebnejávri) at an elevation of 510 m (1,670 ft) and Nedre Daja (Lower Lake Daja; also Norwegian: Dajavatnet, Lule Sami: Vuolep Dája) at an elevation of 358 m (1,175 ft). The level of Kjelvatnet is regulated with water from two other lakes: Balvatnet (Lule Sami: Bállávrre) and Big Lake Dorro (Norwegian: Stor-Dorro, Lule Sami: Bajep Doarrojávrre). Nedre Daja is too small a body of water to rely on, and so electricity production must be coordinated with the Fagerli Hydroelectric Power Station, which utilizes the drop from Nedre Daja to Langvatnet (Long Lake). Today the plant has an installed capacity of 30 MW, with an average annual production of about 157 GWh from a catchment area of 404.6 square kilometers (156.2 sq mi).

The plant was built in 1958 by Balmi Kraftlag with Sulitjelma Mines as the main shareholder at 60%; Salten Kraftsamband (SKS) later acquired 40%. In 1983 the mining operations came under state ownership together with ownership of the watercourse. SKS operated the plant on behalf of the state until 1997, when it was able to buy the state's stake in the plant. Due to the former mining operations in Sulitjelma and the hope for new operations, there is still a clause for up to 30 GWh/year to be used at cost by any new mining operation.

== See also ==
- Fagerli Hydroelectric Power Station
