= Sjønstå Hydroelectric Power Station =

Sjønstå Power Station
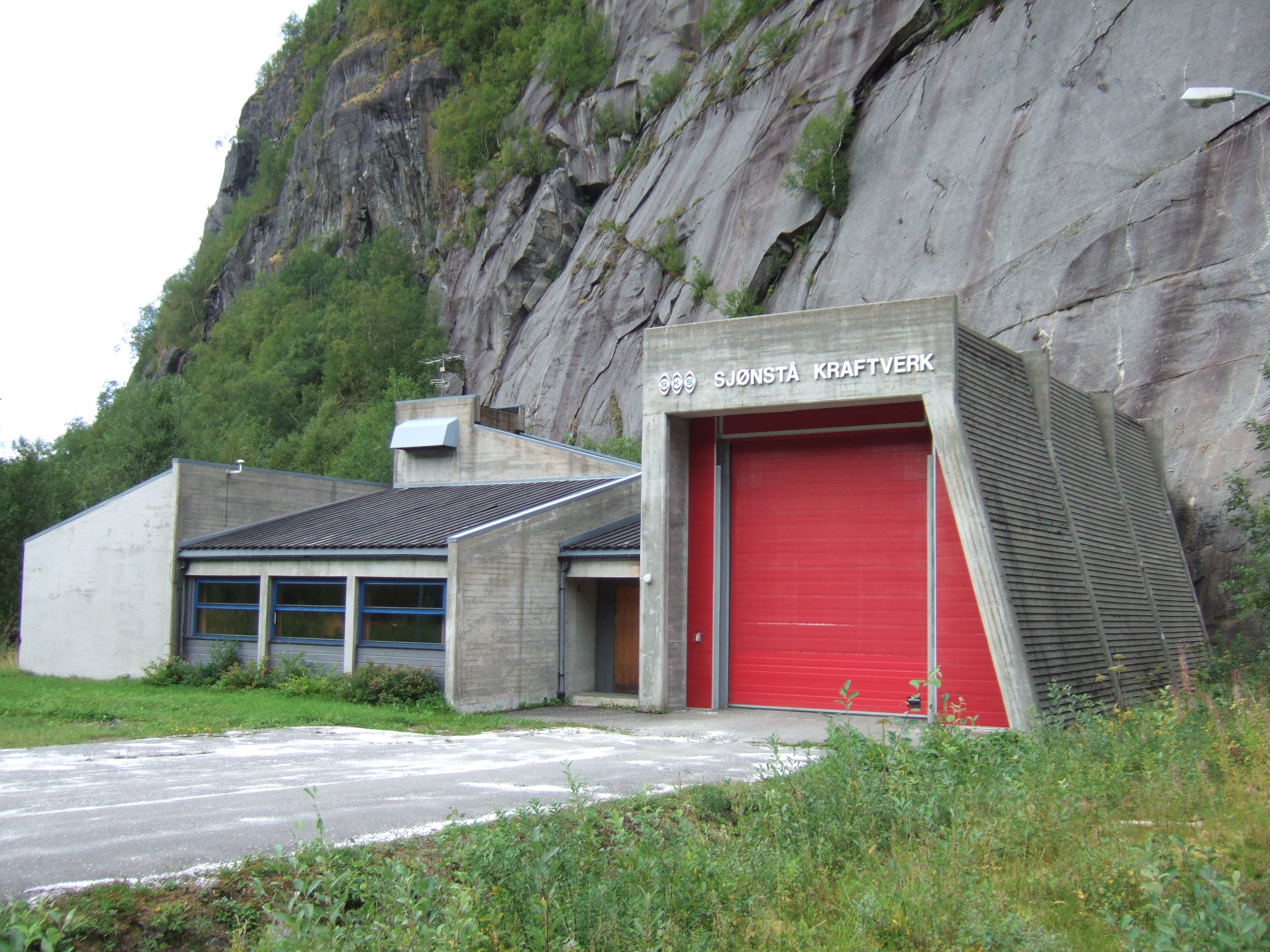
- Official name: Sjønstå kraftverk
- Country: Norway
- Location: Sjønstå, Nordland
- Coordinates: 67°11′40″N 15°42′31″E
- Status: Operational
- Opening date: 1983; 42 years ago
- Owner(s): Salten Kraftsamband

Power Station
- Hydraulic head: 126 m
- Turbines: 2 × 35 MW
- Installed capacity: 70 MW
- Capacity factor: 46.0%
- Annual generation: 282 GW·h

The Sjønstå Hydroelectric Power Station (Norwegian: Sjønstå kraftverk or Sjønstå kraftstasjon) is a hydroelectric power station in Fauske Municipality in Nordland county, Norway. It is located about 1.4 kilometers (0.87 mi) south-southwest of Sjønstå. It utilizes a drop of 126 meters (413 ft) in the Sjønstå River between Langvatnet (Long Lake) and Øvervatnet (Upper Lake). The plant is a river power station without its own reservoir. It also draws water from the Tverr River and one stream intake. The plant has two 35 MW Francis turbines for an installed capacity of 70 MW, with an average annual production of about 282 GWh. It is owned by Salten Kraftsamband and came into operation in 1983. The plant reuses water that was previously utilized by the Lomi and Fagerli hydroelectric power stations.
