= Lomi (disambiguation) =

Lomi or Pancit Lomi is a Chinese-Filipino noodle dish.

Lomi or LOMI may also refer to:

- Lomi salmon, a side dish in Pacific island cuisine
- lomilomi massage, Hawaiian massage
- LOMI or St. Petersburg Department of Steklov Institute of Mathematics of Russian Academy of Sciences
- Aurelio Lomi (1556 - 1622), Italian painter
- Lomi Hydroelectric Power Station, a hydroelectric power station in Nordland county, Norway
