= Balmielva =

Location
- Country: Norway
- County: Nordland
- Municipality: Fauske Municipality

Physical characteristics
- Source: Kjelvatnet
  - location: Fauske Municipality, Norway
  - coordinates: 67.07579°N 16.04635°E
  - elevation: 510 metres (1,670 ft)
- Mouth: Langvatnet
  - location: Fauske Municipality, Norway
  - coordinates: 67.1215°N 16.09299°E
  - elevation: 127 metres (417 ft)
- Length: 6.5 km (4.0 mi)
- Basin size: 439 km^{2} (169 sq mi)

The Balmielva or Balmi is a river in Fauske Municipality in Nordland county, Norway. It flows about 6.5 km (4.0 mi) from the lake Kjelvatnet (Lule Sami: Giebbnejávrre) at an elevation of 510 meters (1,670 ft) north to the lake Langvatnet at an elevation of 127 meters (417 ft). The river has a drainage basin of 439 square kilometers (169 sq mi). The river is located a short distance south of the village of Sulitjelma and about 35 kilometres (22 mi) southeast of the Fauske.

The Fagerli and Daja hydroelectric power stations, operated by Salten Kraftsamband, are located on the river.
