= Fauske Lysverk =

Private power company in Fauske, Norway

Fauske Lysverk AS
- Company type: Private
- Industry: Power
- Founded: 1913
- Headquarters: Fauske, Norway
- Area served: Norway
- Key people: Ove Sørdahl (CEO); Leif Roar Stavnes (Chairman)
- Revenue: ▲54 million kr (2009)
- Operating income: 7 million kr (2009)
- Net income: 4 million kr (2009)
- Number of employees: 36 (2007)
- Website: www.flv.no and www.fauskelv.no

Fauske Lysverk is a private power company that operates the power grid in Fauske Municipality in Nordland county, Norway with 6,000 customers and 440 kilometres (270 mi) of power lines. The company does not have any of its own power production. The largest owner is Fauske Municipality (44.64%), Bodø Energi (12.4%) and Salten Kraftsamband. Fauske Lysverk was founded in 1913. As of May 2004 the number of shareholders in the company were 552. The name was later changed to Indre Salten Energi.
