= Forså Hydroelectric Power Station =

Hydroelectric power station in Gildeskål, Nordland, Norway

Forså Power Station
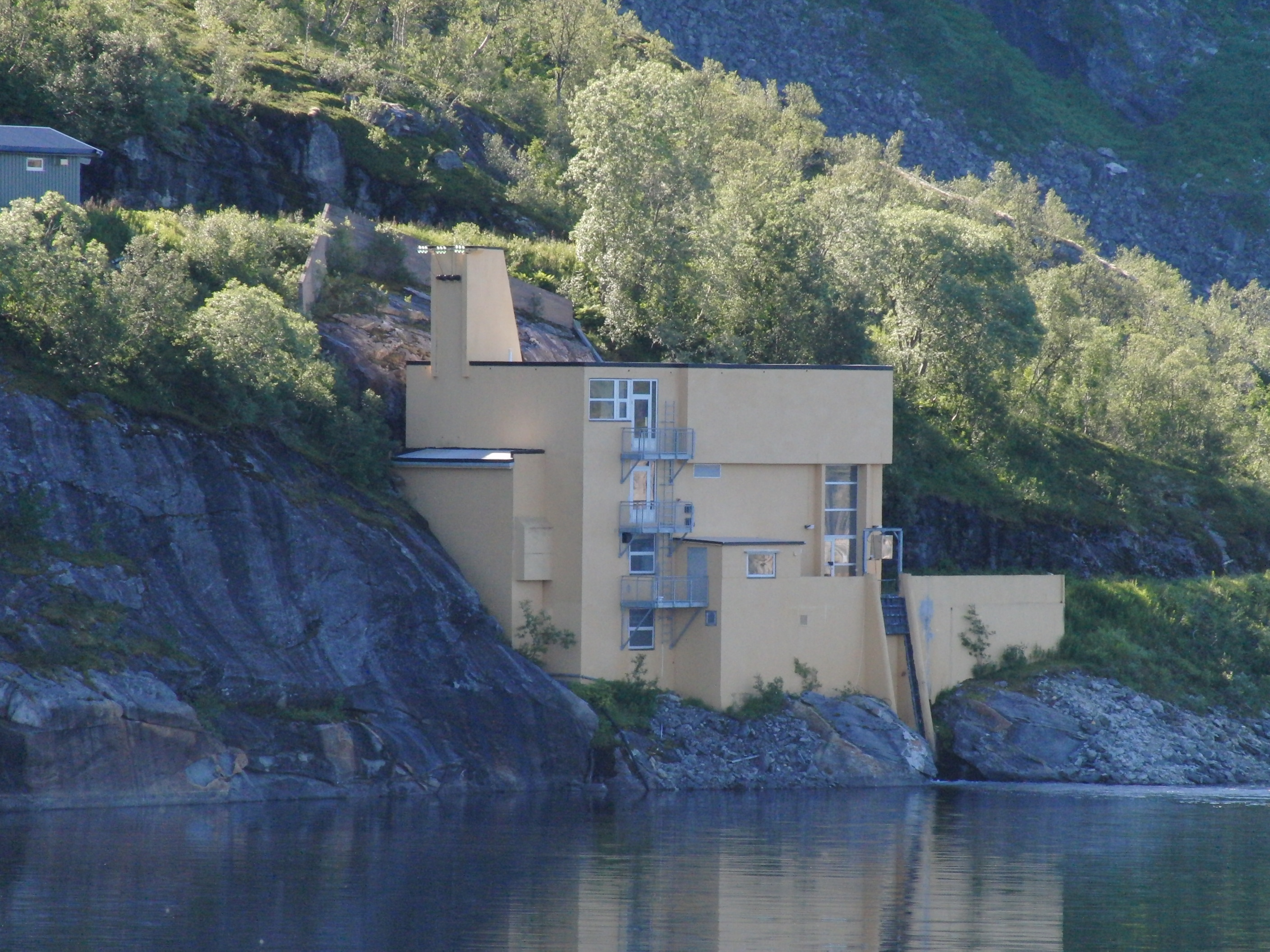
- Official name: Forså kraftverk
- Country: Norway
- Location: Gildeskål Municipality, Nordland
- Coordinates: 66°57′05″N 14°13′31″E
- Status: Operational
- Commission date: 1963
- Owner: Salten Kraftsamband
- Operator

Tidal power station
- Tidal range: 266 m (873 ft); 314 m (1,030 ft)

Power generation
- Nameplate capacity: 12 MW
- Annual net output: 48 GWh

The Forså Hydroelectric Power Station (Norwegian: Forså kraftverk or Forså kraftstasjon) is a hydroelectric power station in Gildeskål Municipality in Nordland county, Norway. Part of the plant's catchment area also lies in Beiarn Municipality.

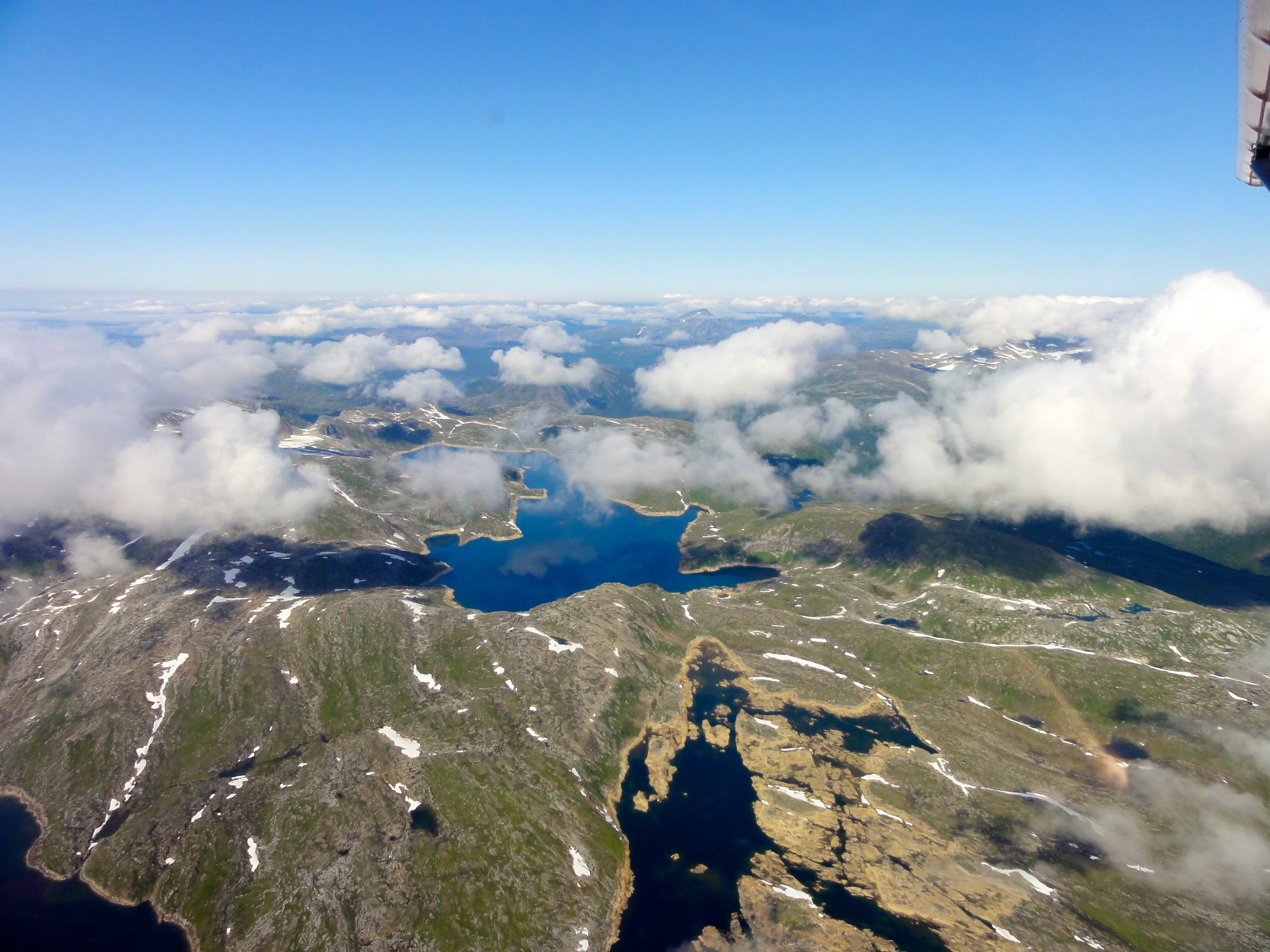
Øvre Nævervatnet is one of the reservoirs for the Forså power station. Part of another lake supplying the plant, Namnlausvatnet, lies in the foreground.

The plant utilizes a drop of 266 meters (873 ft) between two lakes: Litle Sokumvatnet (also Norwegian: Lille Sokumvann, Lule Sami: Såhkamjávrásj), which is linked to Namnlausvatnet and is regulated between an elevation of 645 m (2,116 ft) and 637 m (2,090 ft), and Øvre Nævervatnet (Lule Sami: Båssjukjávrre), which is regulated between an elevation of 604 m (1,982 ft) and 580 m (1,900 ft).

The plant has one turbine with an installed capacity of 12 megawatts (16,000 hp) and an average annual production of about 48 gigawatt-hours (170 TJ). Its catchment area is 25.5 square kilometers (9.8 sq mi). The plant was originally built by Norsk Hydro to supply industry at Glomfjord and is now owned by Salten Kraftsamband. It came into operation in 1963. The water that leaves the plant is later reused by the Sundsfjord Hydroelectric Power Station.
