= Litle Sokumvatnet =

Lake in Nordland, Norway

Litle Sokumvatnet (Norwegian); Såhkamjávrásj (Lule Sami)
- Interactive map of the lake
- Location: Gildeskål and Beiarn, Nordland
- Coordinates: 66.9602°N 14.2659°E
- Basin countries: Norway
- Max. length: 4 kilometres (2.5 mi)
- Max. width: 1.5 kilometres (0.93 mi)
- Surface area: 4.53 km^{2} (1.75 sq mi)
- Shore length^{1}: 22.73 kilometres (14.12 mi)
- Surface elevation: 649 metres (2,129 ft)
- References: NVE
- ^{1} Shore length is not a well-defined measure.

Litle Sokumvatnet (Norwegian) or Såhkamjávrásj (Lule Sami) is a lake that lies in Gildeskål Municipality (with a very small portion crossing into neighboring Beiarn Municipality) in Nordland county, Norway. Litle Sokumvatnet lies directly northeast of the larger lake Sokumvatnet. The lake serves as a reservoir for the Forså Hydroelectric Power Station.

== See also ==
- List of lakes in Norway
- Geography of Norway
