= Lomivatnet =

Lake in Fauske, Norway

Lomivatnet (Norwegian); Loamejávrre (Lule Sami)
- Historic: Loamejávri (Lule Sami); Låmivatnet (Norwegian); Loamevatnet (Norwegian)
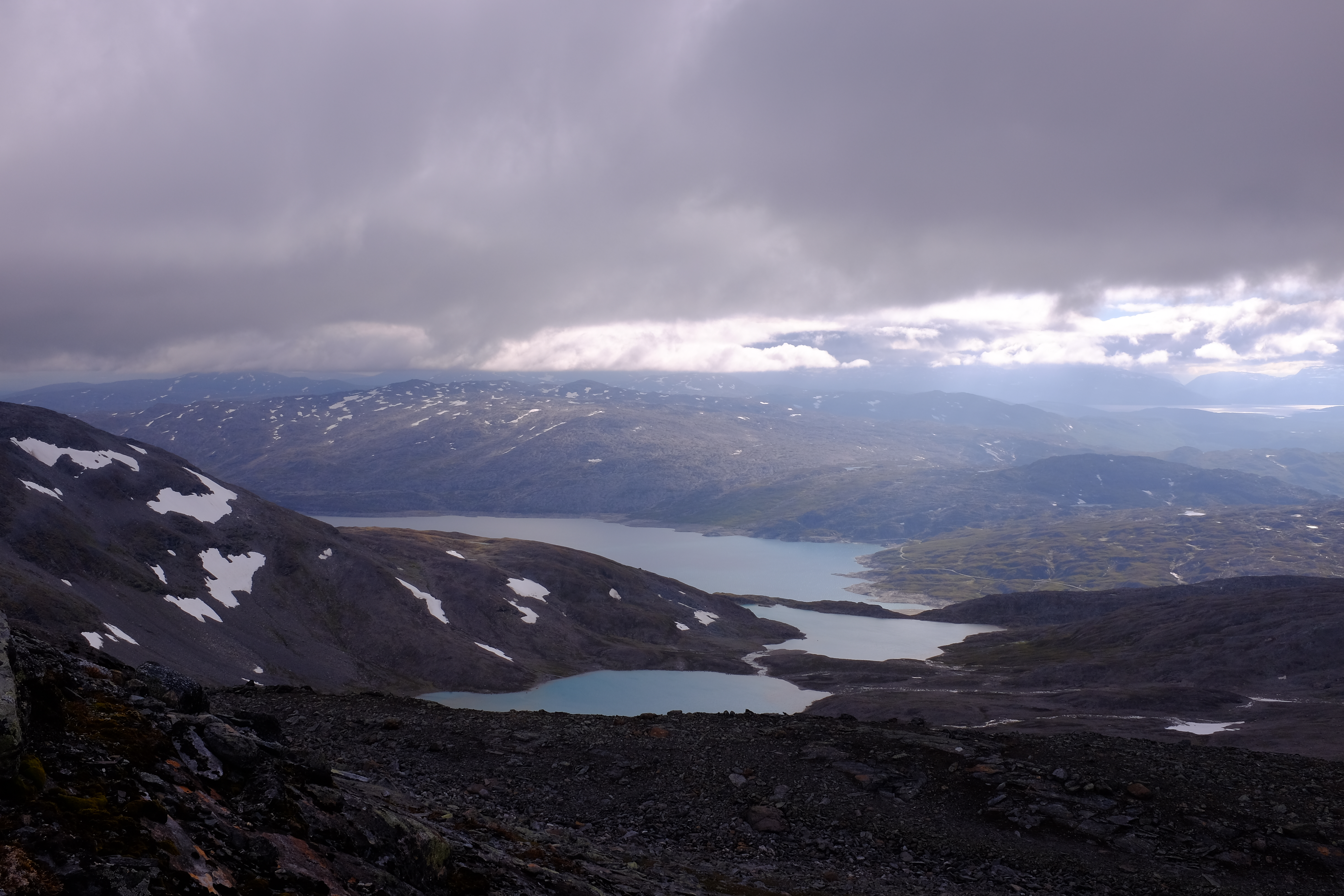
- Interactive map of the lake
- Location: Fauske Municipality, Nordland
- Coordinates: 67.0989°N 16.2616°E
- Basin countries: Norway
- Max. length: 6.5 kilometres (4.0 mi)
- Max. width: 2.5 kilometres (1.6 mi)
- Surface area: 11.43 km^{2} (4.41 sq mi)
- Shore length^{1}: 21.95 kilometres (13.64 mi)
- Surface elevation: 709 metres (2,326 ft)
- References: NVE
- ^{1} Shore length is not a well-defined measure.

Lomivatnet (Norwegian) or Loamejávrre (Lule Sami) is a lake in Fauske Municipality in Nordland county, Norway. The 11.43-square-kilometre (4.41 sq mi) lake lies about 5 kilometres (3.1 mi) east of the village of Sulitjelma, just south of the Sulitjelma Glacier and north of Junkerdal National Park. The border with Sweden is 3 kilometres (1.9 mi) east of the lake. The Lomi Hydroelectric Power Station uses the lake as a reservoir.

== See also ==
- List of lakes in Norway
- Geography of Norway
