= Lomi Hydroelectric Power Station =

Lomi Power Station
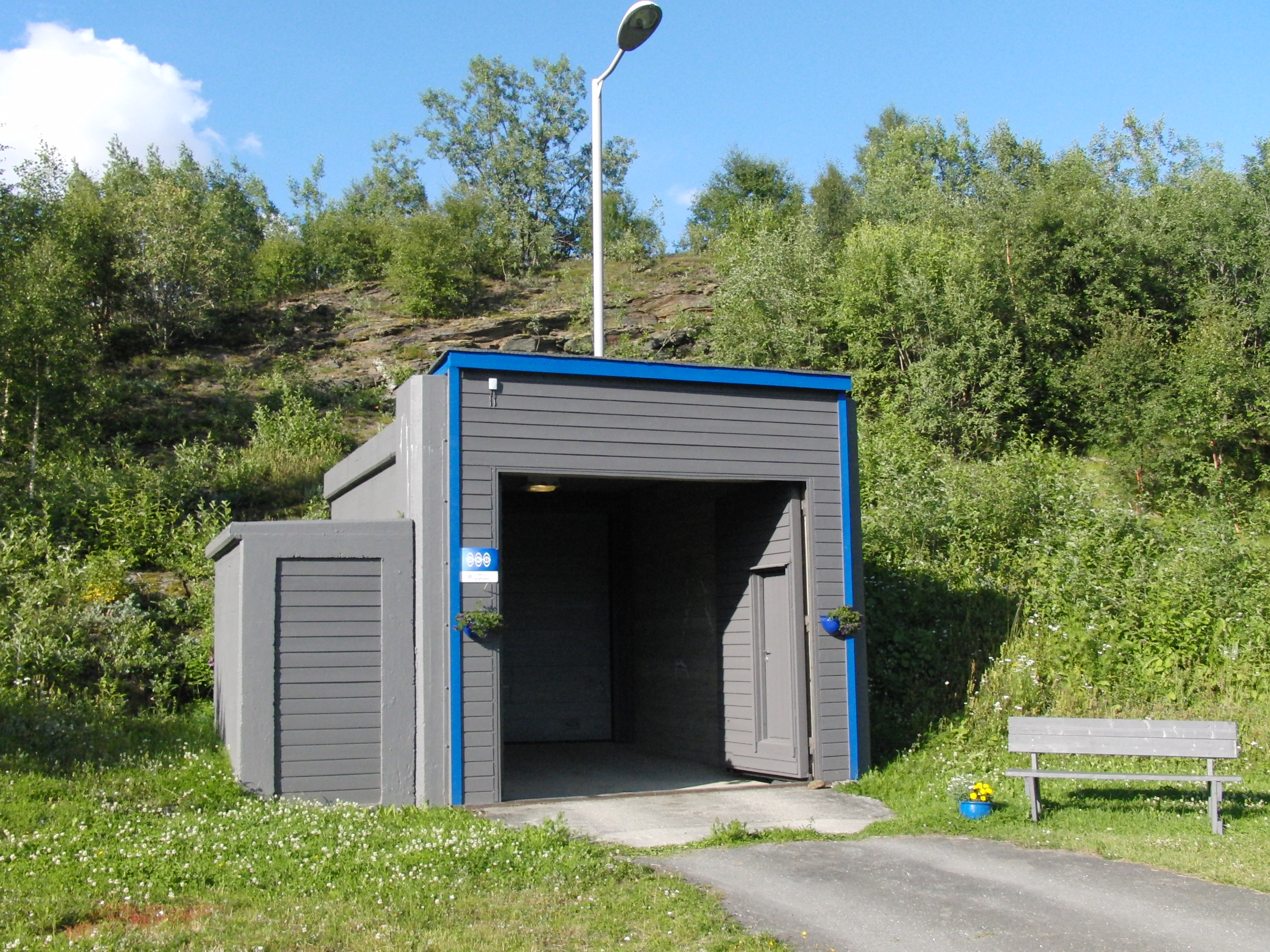
- Official name: Lomi kraftverk
- Country: Norway
- Location: Sulitjelma, Nordland
- Coordinates: 67°07′26″N 16°05′49″E
- Status: Operational
- Opening date: 1979; 46 years ago
- Owner(s): Salten Kraftsamband

Reservoir
- Creates: Lomivatnet

Power Station
- Hydraulic head: 580 m
- Turbines: 2
- Installed capacity: 120 MW
- Capacity factor: 34.5%
- Annual generation: 362 GW·h

The Lomi Hydroelectric Power Station (Norwegian: Lomi kraftverk or Lomi kraftstasjon) is a hydroelectric power station in Fauske Municipality in Nordland county, Norway. It utilizes a drop of 580 meters (1,900 ft) between its intake reservoir on Lomivatnet (Lake Lomi, Lule Sami: Loamejávrre), which can be regulated at a level between 708 m (2,323 ft) and 649 m (2,129 ft). The reservoir is supplied by water from Storelvvatnan (Lule Sami: Duolldagåpjávrre), a lake regulated at a level between 798 m (2,618 ft) and 792 m (2,598 ft), and also by some stream intakes. Part of the water supplying the plant is runoff from the Sulitjelma Glacier. The plant has two Francis turbines and operates at an installed capacity of 120 MW, with an average annual production of about 362 GWh. Its total catchment area is 145 square kilometers (56 sq mi). The plant is owned by Salten Kraftsamband and came into operation in 1979. The water is reused by the Sjønstå Hydroelectric Power Station further downstream in the Sulitjelma drainage system.
