= Kjelvatnet (Fauske) =

Lake in Fauske, Norway

Kjelvatnet (Norwegian) Giebbnejávrre (Lule Sami)
- Interactive map of the lake
- Location: Fauske Municipality, Nordland
- Coordinates: 67.0645°N 16.0296°E
- Basin countries: Norway
- Max. length: 3.5 kilometres (2.2 mi)
- Max. width: 2 kilometres (1.2 mi)
- Surface area: 3.85 km^{2} (1.49 sq mi)
- Shore length^{1}: 16.23 kilometres (10.08 mi)
- Surface elevation: 510 metres (1,670 ft)
- References: NVE
- ^{1} Shore length is not a well-defined measure.

Kjelvatnet (Norwegian) or Giebbnejávrre (Lule Sami) is a lake in Fauske Municipality in Nordland county, Norway. The 3.85-square-kilometre (1.49 sq mi) lake lies about 7 kilometres (4.3 mi) south of the village of Sulitjelma near the border with Junkerdal National Park. Water flows into the lake from the large lake Balvatnet (in Saltdal Municipality) and it flows out of the lake to the north along the Balmi River to the lake Langvatnet.

== See also ==
- List of lakes in Norway
- Geography of Norway
