= Sulitjelma Glacier =

Glacier in Norway and Sweden

Sulitjelma Glacier: Sulitjelmaisen (Norwegian); Sállajiegŋa (Lule Sami); Salajekna (Swedish)
- Historic: Sallajiegŋa, Sallajiegņa, Sállajiekna
- Aerial view of the glacier
- Interactive map of the glacier
- Type: Valley
- Location: Norway and Sweden
- Coordinates: 67.1362°N 16.3423°E
- Area: 24 km^{2} (9.3 sq mi)
- Thickness: 300 metres (980 ft)
- Highest elevation: 1,680 metres (5,510 ft)
- Lowest elevation: 830 metres (2,720 ft)

The Sulitjelma Glacier (also: Sulitjelmaisen (Norwegian), Sállajiegŋa (Lule Sami), or Salajekna (Swedish)) is one of the largest glaciers in mainland Norway. The 24-square-kilometre (9.3 sq mi) glacier is located in mostly in Norway, but the eastern part crosses over into Sweden. The Norwegian part is in Fauske Municipality in Nordland county, about 40 kilometres (25 mi) east of the town of Fauske. The Swedish part (where it is referred to as Salajekna) lies on the border of Arjeplog Municipality and Jokkmokk Municipality in Norrbotten County. When the whole glacier is considered, it is the largest glacier in Sweden.

The glacier's highest point is 1,680 metres (5,510 ft) above sea level and its lowest point is at an elevation of 830 metres (2,720 ft). The Sulitjelma mountain rises to 1,908 metres (6,260 ft). The glacier has retreated in recent years. The lake Låmivatnet lies just south of the glacier.

Stockholm University operates an automatic weather station near the glacier front.

== See also ==
- List of glaciers in Norway
