= Fagerli Hydroelectric Power Station =

Fagerli Power Station
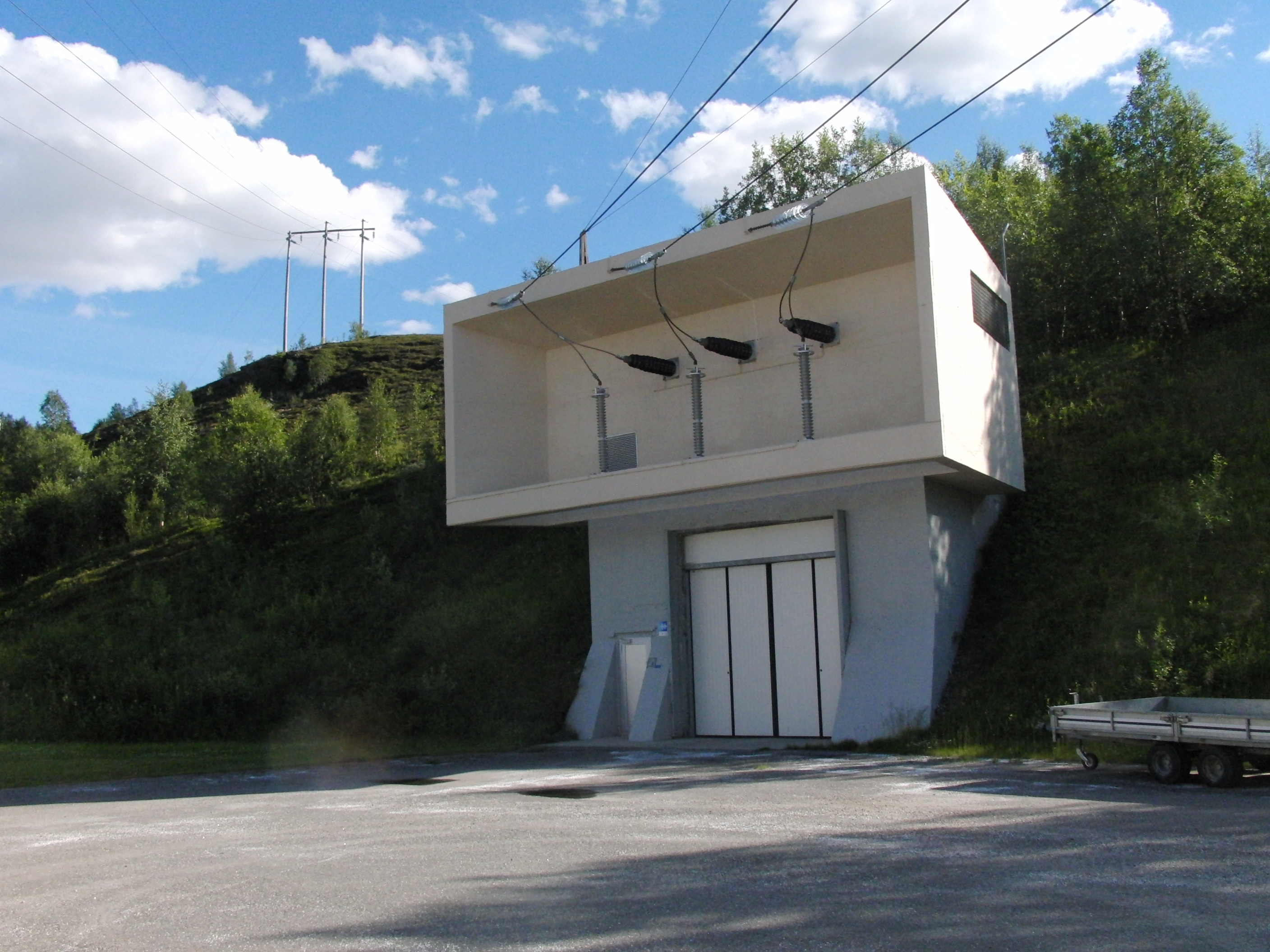
- Official name: Fagerli kraftverk
- Country: Norway
- Location: Sulitjelma, Nordland
- Coordinates: 67°07′09″N 16°04′38″E
- Status: Operational
- Opening date: 1975; 50 years ago
- Owner(s): Salten Kraftsamband

Upper reservoir
- Creates: Nedre Daja

Lower reservoir
- Creates: Langvatnet

Power Station
- Hydraulic head: 232 m
- Installed capacity: 48 MW
- Capacity factor: 59.9%
- Annual generation: 252 GW·h

The Fagerli Hydroelectric Power Station (Norwegian: Fagerli kraftverk or Fagerli kraftstasjon) is a hydroelectric power station in Fauske Municipality in Nordland county, Norway. It utilizes a drop of 232 meters (761 ft) between its intake reservoir at Nedre Daja (Lower Lake Daja; also Norwegian: Dajavatnet, Lule Sami: Vuolep Dája) and Langvatnet (Long Lake) in Sulitjelma. The plant operates at an installed capacity of 48 megawatts (64,000 hp), with an average annual production of about 252 gigawatt-hours (910 TJ). It is owned by Salten Kraftsamband and came into operation in 1975. The Fagerli plant was the first one built by Salten Kraftsamband, in cooperation with Sulitjelma Mines.

== The old Fagerli Power Station ==
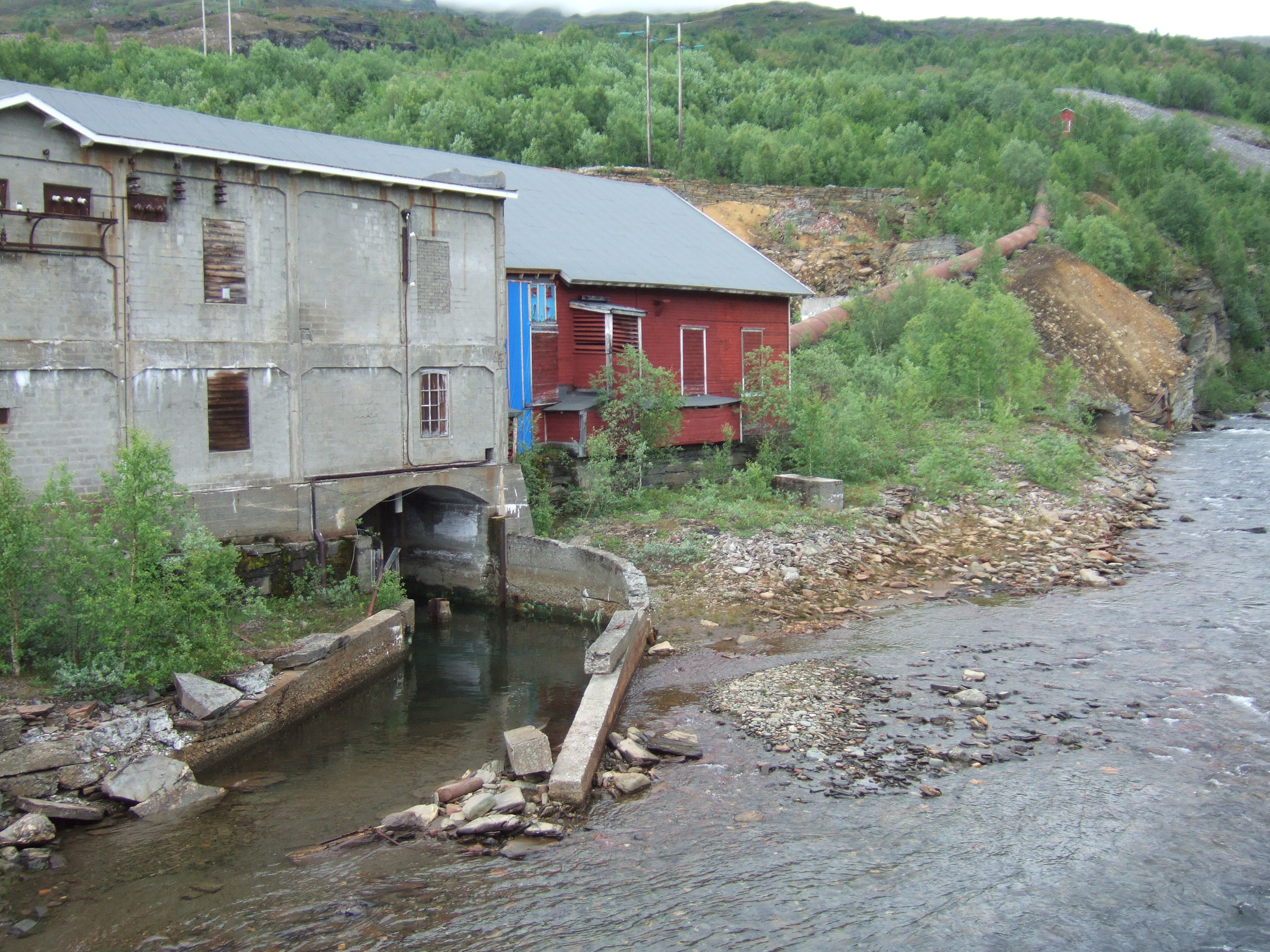
The old Fagerli power station was built by Sulitjelma Mines. The remaining buildings currently belong to the Sulitjelma Museum.

By 1898 a power station had been set up at the outflow of the Balmi River into Langvatnet, also named the Fagerli Power Station. It was built by Sulitjelma Mines and supplied electricity for general use in Sulitjelma and to the mine. It originally had an installed capacity of 175 kVA and a voltage of 5 kV. The power station was upgraded several times, and in 1929 a 4.2 MVA generator was installed with a 3.6 megawatts (4,800 hp) turbine. The gross head was 43 m (141 ft) with a maximum discharge of 10 m^{3}/s (350 cu ft/s). A particular problem was the large amount of sediment carried by the Balmi River, which caused extensive wear and tear to the turbines.

== See also ==
- Daja Hydroelectric Power Station
