= Salten Kraftsamband =

Norwegian HPS company

Salten Kraftsamband AS
- Type: Private
- Industry: Power
- Founded: 1956
- Headquarters: Fauske, Norway
- Area served: Salten
- Products: Hydroelectricity
- Number of employees: 150 (2007)
- Website: www.sks.no

Salten Kraftsamband or SKS is a Norwegian power company that operates twenty-one hydroelectric power stations with annual production of 2.2 TWh. Since 1997 the company has also sold power to end-users. Head offices are located in Fauske.

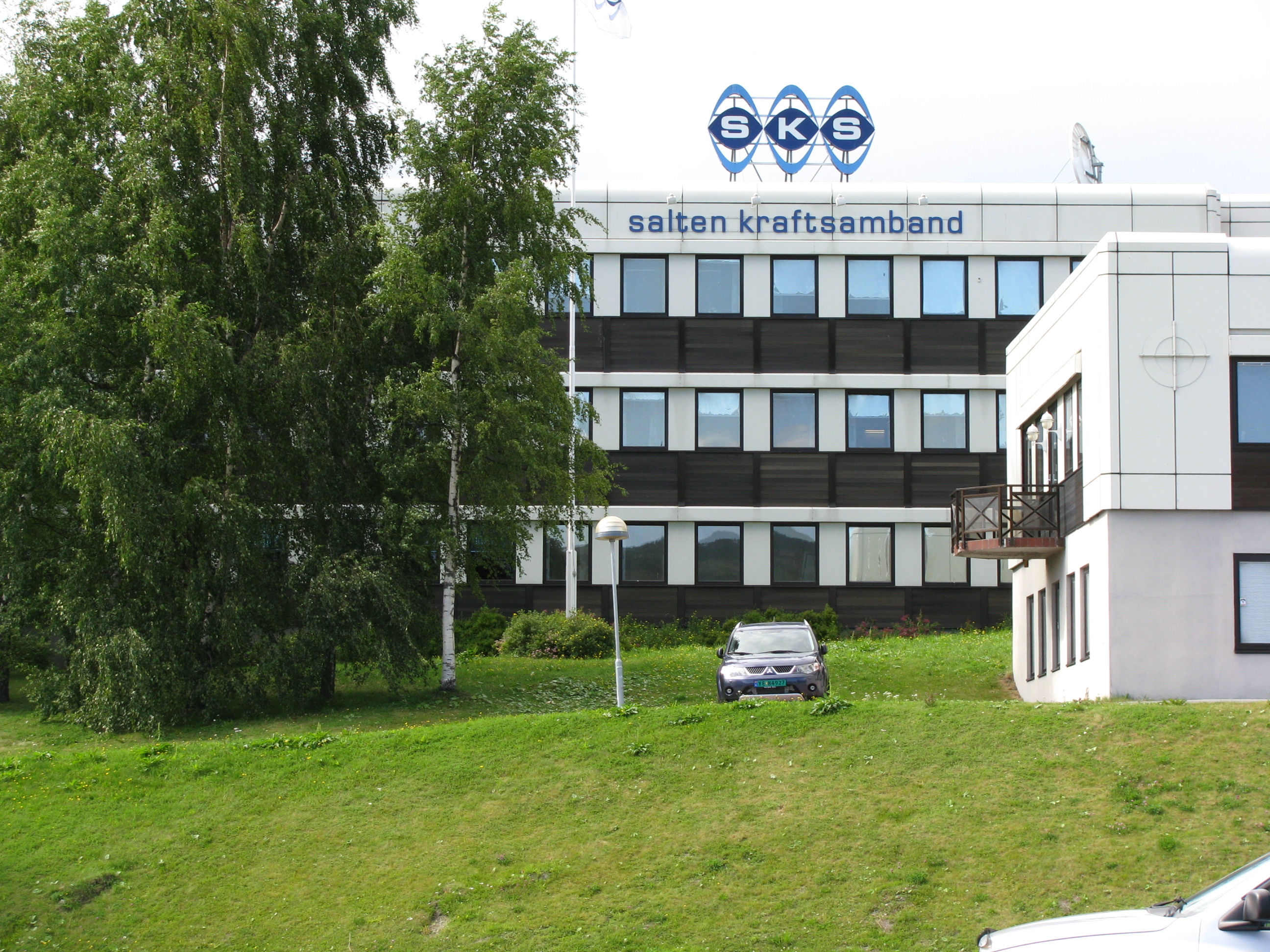
Head office in Fauske

The company is owned by Bodø Municipality (47.72%), Troms Kraft (20.35%), Fauske Municipality (12.83%), Nordkraft (8.86%), Sjøfossen Energi (6.92%) and Skjerstad Kraftlag (3.32%). DONG Energy bought its ownership from Elkem and Meløy Energi while Narvik Energi bought it from Skjerstad Kraftlag and Sørfold Municipality. In 2010, DONG Energy sold its stake to Troms Kraft.

== Operations ==
Salten Kraftsamband operates the Daja, Fagerli, Lomi, and Sjønstå power stations on the Sjønstå River in Sulitjelma and the Forså, Langvann, Sundsfjord, and Oldereid power stations in Salten. It also owns 58% of Rødøy-Lurøy Kraftverk and 60% of Nord-Norsk Vindkraft and part of Fauske Lysverk.

== History ==
SKS was founded in 1956 when Bodø Municipality, Bodin Municipality, and Fauske Municipality joined to create a power grid from the power stations in Sulitjelma to Outer Salten where the largest population was located. The municipalities had cooperated in building the power plants but needed a separate company to transport the electricity. In the end of the 50s SKS built the Deja station. The current structure of the company arose in 1975 with a merger of Salten Kraftlag. In the 1980s there was major work on creating a vertical integrated power company for all of Salten, and in the long term a county municipality owned company for all of Nordland. But local fluctuation and concern for every petty local job made a consolidation impossible. In 1991 the new energy law was passed, killing the process. In 2000 SKS tried to merge with Bodø Energi and Fauske Lysverk, but the fusion failed.
