= Bodø Energi =

Electricity company in Norway

Bodø Energi AS
- Type: Public
- Industry: Power
- Genre: Renewable energy
- Founded: 1909
- Founder: City of Bodø
- Headquarters: Bodø, Norway
- Area served: Bodø
- Key people: Monica Fjelstad Hansen (CEO); Ole-Wilhelm Meyer (Chairman)
- Owner: Bodø Municipality
- Number of employees: 12 (2025)
- Website: bodoenergi.no

Bodø Energi is a power company, with subsidiaries that conduct grid operations, contractor services, district heating and power sales. Bodø Energy is 100% owned by the Bodø Municipality.

As of December 31, 2019, the Group consists of the following companies:

- Bodø Energi AS (parent company, 100% owned by Bodø municipality)
- BE Power Sales AS (100% owned)
- BE Varme AS (100% owned)
- FJUEL Bodø AS (51% owned)
- PWR UP AS (49% owned)
- FROST Kraftentreprenør AS (51% owned)

== History ==
1909	Bodø Municipal Electricity Works is a reality after Bodø Municipality in 1908 decided to "build an electricity plant with Møllestø - Breivafos in the Breivaelven in Bodin with transmission lines to Bodø." Breiva Power Station was started on May 1, 1909. "The power station consists of 2 Generators of 175 kW, a total of 350 kW."
1917	Bertnes Power Station is commissioned in October 1917, a 450 kVA machine unit.
1921	A new machine unit is started at Bertnes Power Station - 550 kVA
1924	Bodin power station is completed after 6 years of construction. The plant at Heggmovatnet was able to supply 36 million kWh per year.
1940	On May 27, Bodø is bombed due to World War II. The power was gone from May 27 to June 6.
1948	A / L Kjerringøy Kraftlag is formally formed on January 11.
1949	Constituent general meeting of Salten Kraftlag A / L is held in Bodø, where Bodø and Skjerstad participated.
1954	On December 20, the power is switched on to the subscribers in Kjerringøy.
1956	Salten Kraftsamband A/L is constituted. Bodin and Bodø Municipality have a total of 50 shares out of a total of 61 in the company.
1959	Salten Kraftsamband A/L's administration is moved to Bodø under Bodø Elverk. Bodin Kraftverk puts out sea cables to Landegode.
1960	Breiva Power Station and Bertnes Power Station are closed.
1968	Merger between Bodin Municipality and Bodø Municipality. Bodø Power Plant is merged with Bodin Power Plant. At the same time Kjerringøy Kraftlag is bought.
1973	Bodø Elverk moves into new offices in Sivert Nielsensgate 52.
1975	Salten Kraftsamband AS expands by adding more municipalities as owners. Salten Kraftlag A/L is merged with Salten Kraftsamband AS. Salten Kraftsamband AS establishes its own administration in Sivert Nielsensgate 52.
1978	In December, the administration in Salten Kraftsamband AS moves to Fauske.
1981	The newly restored power station at Heggmoen goes into operation in November.
1983	The warehouse building in Olav V. Gate 104 is commissioned.
1984	Bodø Elverk is 75 years old. A book is being published in connection with the anniversary.
1992	Bodø Elverk changes name to Bodø Energi AS. What had to then been a municipal agency was transformed to a limited company.
1994	Stormyra district heating plant is put into operation which utilizes waste heat from Løvolds Industrier at Gamle Riksveg.
1995	Undfossen Power Plant was renewed and put into operation in October.
2002	On February 18, Bodø Energi AS moves into Energihuset in Jernbaneveien 85.
2006	Skjerstad Kraftlag was merged into Bodø Energi.
2007	From 1 January 2007, Bodø Energi AS was transformed into a group with a parent company, Bodø Energi AS and 4 subsidiaries, BE Power Sales AS, BE Nett AS, BE Energimontasje AS and BE Production AS.
2008	Bodø Energi purchased the grid in Beiarn and Gildeskål from Sjøfossen Energi.
2009	Bodø Energi AS celebrates its 100th anniversary, and celebrates this with several events for the city's residents. A separate anniversary book is also published.
2011	Bodø Energi AS sells BE production AS to the Salten Kraftsamband AS, and buys the regional grid in Salten and Northern Helgeland from Salten Kraftsamband AS.
2014	The grid operations of Dragefossen Kraftanlegg AS merge into Nordlandsnett AS. Dragefossen acquires 10.1% ownership in Nordlandsnett AS.
2015	The Bodø Energi Group's strategy is to play an active role in restructuring the industry in the region.
2016	Nordlandsnett acquired the grid and contracting business for Rødøy-Lurøy Kraftverk AS. The contracting business was transferred to BE Energimontasje AS. Bodø Energi AS bought Sjøfossen Entreprenør AS. Bodø Energi AS bought Fram Kraftentreprenør AS. BE Varme AS's biofuel plant, Emperor started operation with the supply of district heating based on short-delivered recycled wood waste as the main source.
2017	Bodø Energi AS and Troms Kraft AS form a joint contracting company; Frost Kraftentreprenør AS. Bodø Energi AS owns 51% and Troms Kraft AS 49% in the company.
2018	Bodø Energi and Helgelandskraft form a joint operating center for monitoring networks in both grid areas.
2020	Bodø Energi sells its high-speed fiber optic cable network in Bodø to Signal AS.

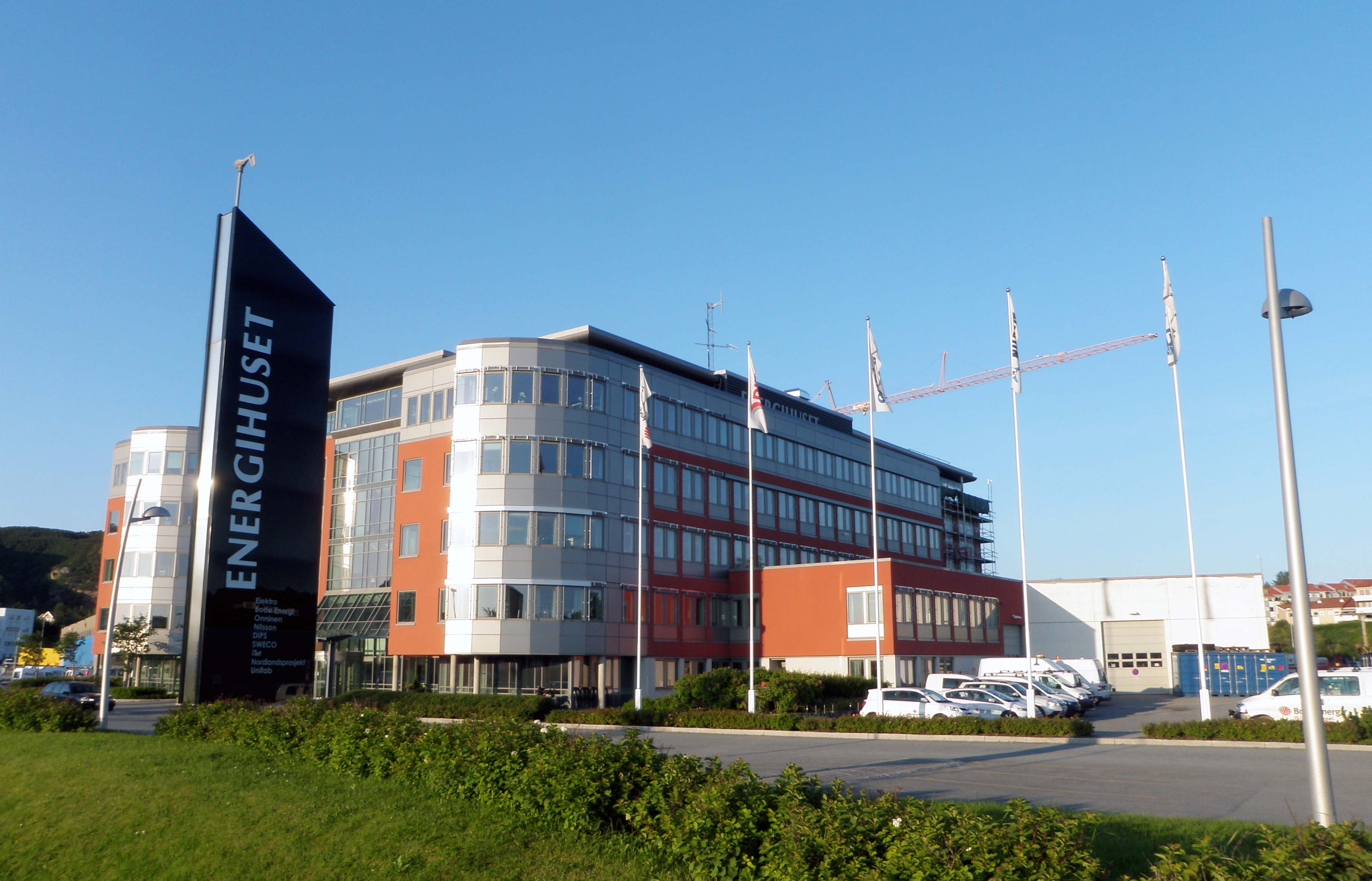
Bodø Energi's headquarters are housed in the office building Energihuset in Bodø
