= Røvassdalen =

Valley in Nordland, Norway

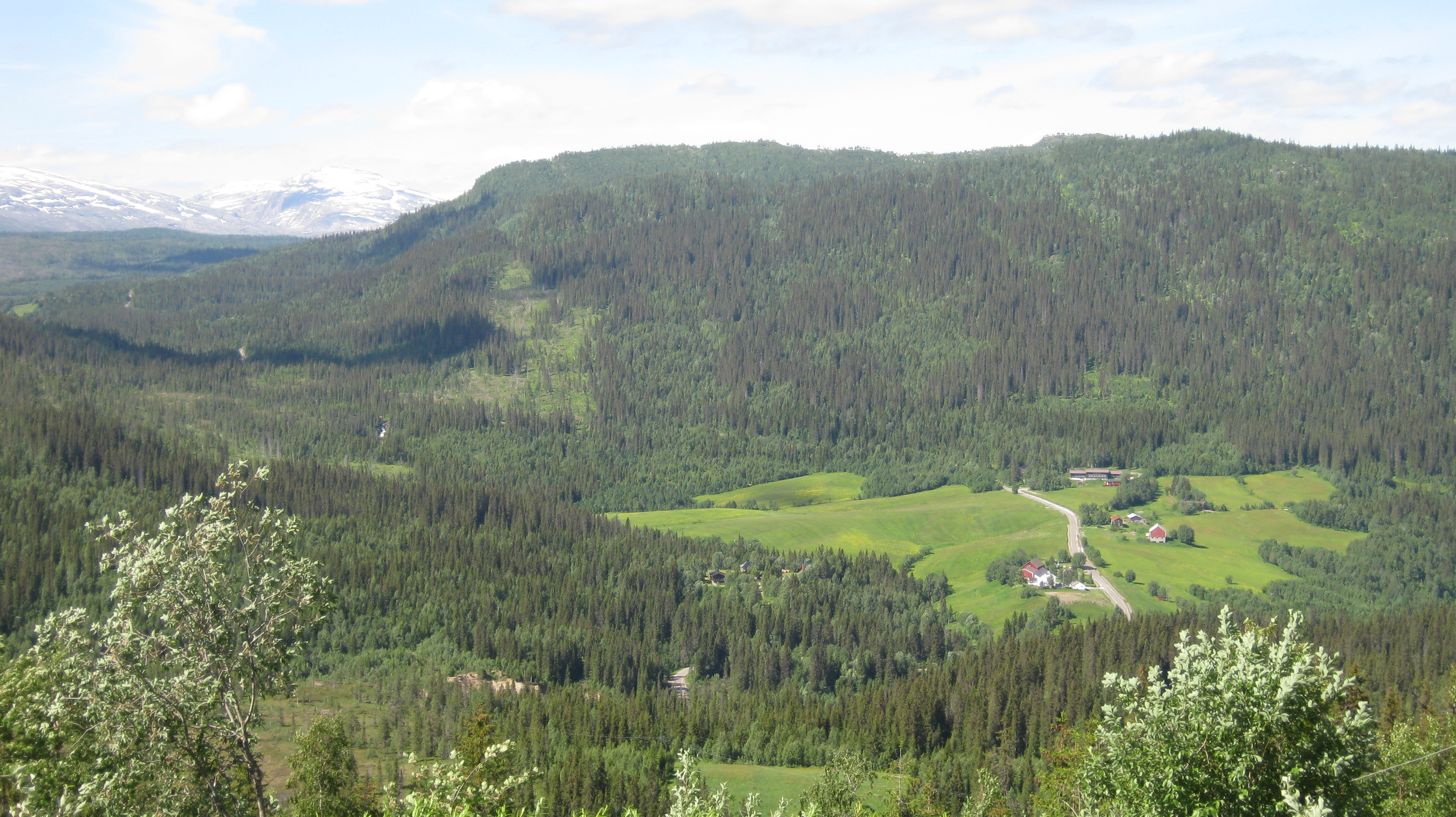
- View of the valley

Geology
- Type: River valley

Geography
- Location: Nordland, Norway
- Coordinates: 66.4717°N 14.4081°E
- Rivers: Røvassåga

Location
- Interactive map of the valley

Røvassdalen is a valley in Rana Municipality in Nordland county, Norway. The upper part of the valley is located within the Saltfjellet–Svartisen National Park. The river of Røvassåga flows through the valley, and later it joins with the rivers Blakkåga and Svartisåga and further down with the Langvassåga. The karst caves Setergrotta and Grønnligrotta are located in the valley.
