= Lossivatnet =

Lake in Nordland, Norway

Lossivatnet (Norwegian) Loasejávri (Northern Sami)
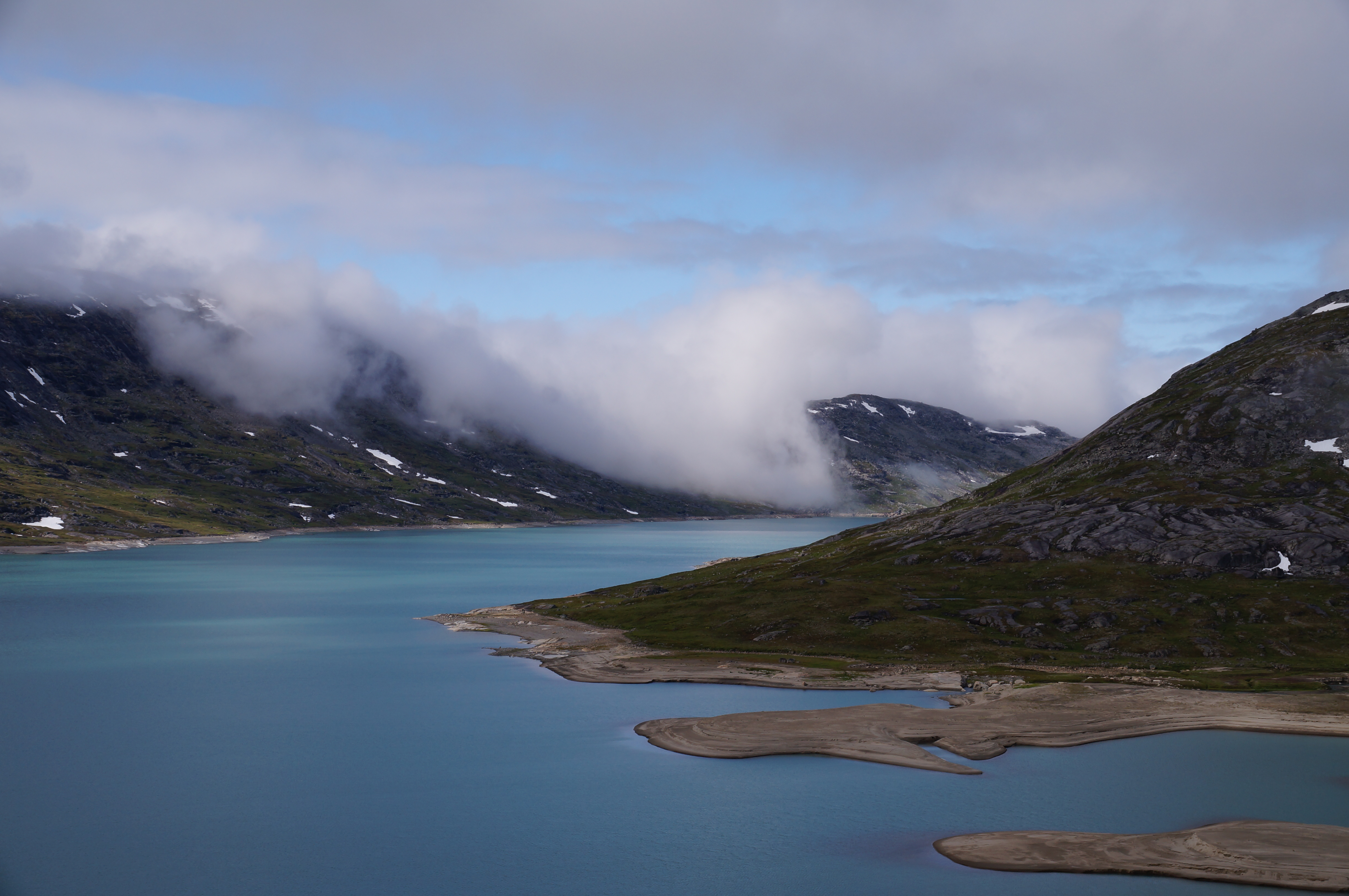
- Interactive map of the lake
- Location: Nordland
- Coordinates: 68.2094°N 17.6924°E
- Basin countries: Norway
- Max. length: 6 kilometres (3.7 mi)
- Max. width: 2 kilometres (1.2 mi)
- Surface area: 6.64 km^{2} (2.56 sq mi)
- Shore length^{1}: 16.21 kilometres (10.07 mi)
- Surface elevation: 735 metres (2,411 ft)
- References: NVE
- ^{1} Shore length is not a well-defined measure.

Lossivatnet (Norwegian) or Loasejávri (Northern Sami) is a lake in Narvik Municipality in Nordland county, Norway. The 6.64-square-kilometre (2.56 sq mi) lake lies just west of the mountain Storsteinfjellet and about 10 kilometres (6.2 mi) east of the village of Elvegård. The water is used for hydroelectric power production.

== See also ==
- List of lakes in Norway
