= Setergrotta =

Cave in Norway

Coordinates: 66°25′15″N 14°15′29″E

Setergrotta (or Setergrotten) is a karst cave in Røvassdalen in Rana Municipality in Nordland county, Norway. It has a total depth of 50 metres (160 ft) and an explored length of 2.4 kilometres (1.5 mi). It is probably connected to the nearby Grønligrotta. The cave contains large galleries and sediments from the latest ice age and younger. It was created 200,000–300,000 years ago.
