= Sealggajávri =

Lake in Nordland, Norway

- Interactive map of the lake
- Location: Nordland
- Coordinates: 68.2480°N 17.9909°E
- Basin countries: Norway
- Max. length: 9 kilometres (5.6 mi)
- Max. width: 800 metres (2,600 ft)
- Surface area: 4.38 km^{2} (1.69 sq mi)
- Shore length^{1}: 23.66 kilometres (14.70 mi)
- Surface elevation: 787 metres (2,582 ft)
- References: NVE
- ^{1} Shore length is not a well-defined measure.

Sealggajávri is a lake in Narvik Municipality in Nordland county, Norway. The 4.38-square-kilometre (1.69 sq mi) lake lies just north of the Storsteinfjellet mountain, about 15 kilometres (9.3 mi) southeast of the village of Beisfjord. The ending -jávri is the word for "lake" in the Northern Sami language.

== See also ==
- List of lakes in Norway
