= Grønnligrotta =

Cave in Rana, Norway

Coordinates: 66.4131°N 14.2743°E

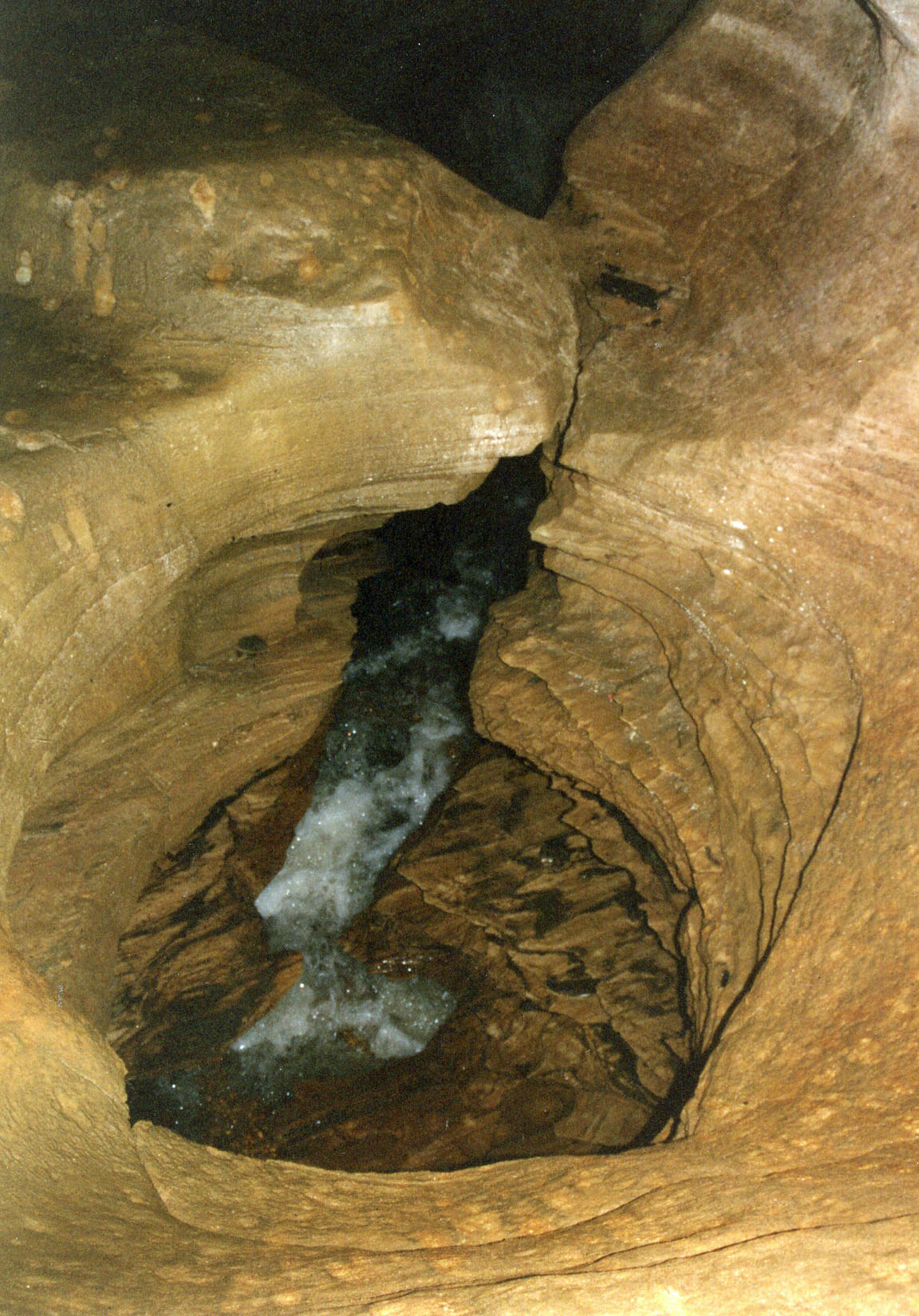
Grønnligrotta

Grønnligrotta is a marble karst cave in Rana Municipality in Nordland county, Norway. It is located in the valley of Røvassdalen, and was first explored in 1914. It has a total depth of 107 metres (351 ft) and explored length of 2 kilometres (1.2 mi). It is probably connected to the nearby Setergrotta. The cave is equipped with artificial lights and open for tourists.
