= Storsteinsfjellet =

Mountain in Narvik, Norway

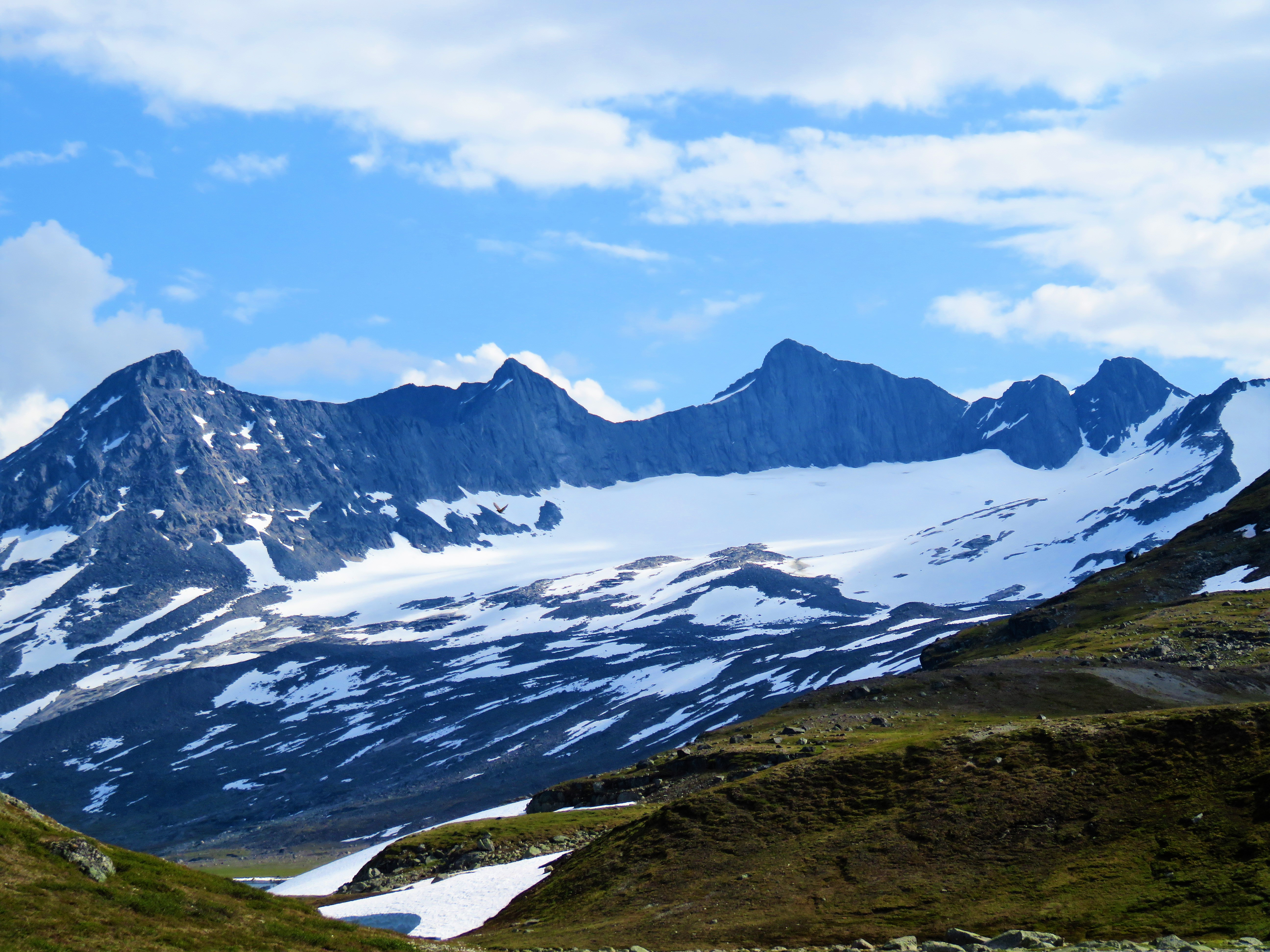

Highest point
- Elevation: 1,894 m (6,214 ft)
- Prominence: 1,186.2 to 1,186.4 m (3,892 to 3,892 ft)
- Isolation: 28.68 to 28.7 km (17.82 to 17.83 mi) to Šielmmáčohkka
- Coordinates: 68.2315°N 17.8768°E

Geography
- Interactive map of the mountain
- Location: Nordland, Norway

Storsteinsfjellet is a mountain ridge in Narvik Municipality in Nordland county, Norway. The mountain ridge is about 13 kilometres (8.1 mi) long and it has six peaks over 1,700 metres (5,600 ft) in elevation. The highest peak is Kirken at 1,894 metres (6,214 ft) above sea level. Storsteinsfjellet lies about 30 kilometres (19 mi) southeast of the town of Narvik. The lake Sealggajávri lies immediately north of the mountain and the lake Lossivatnet lies just west of the mountain.
