= Langvassåga =

River in Nordland, Norway

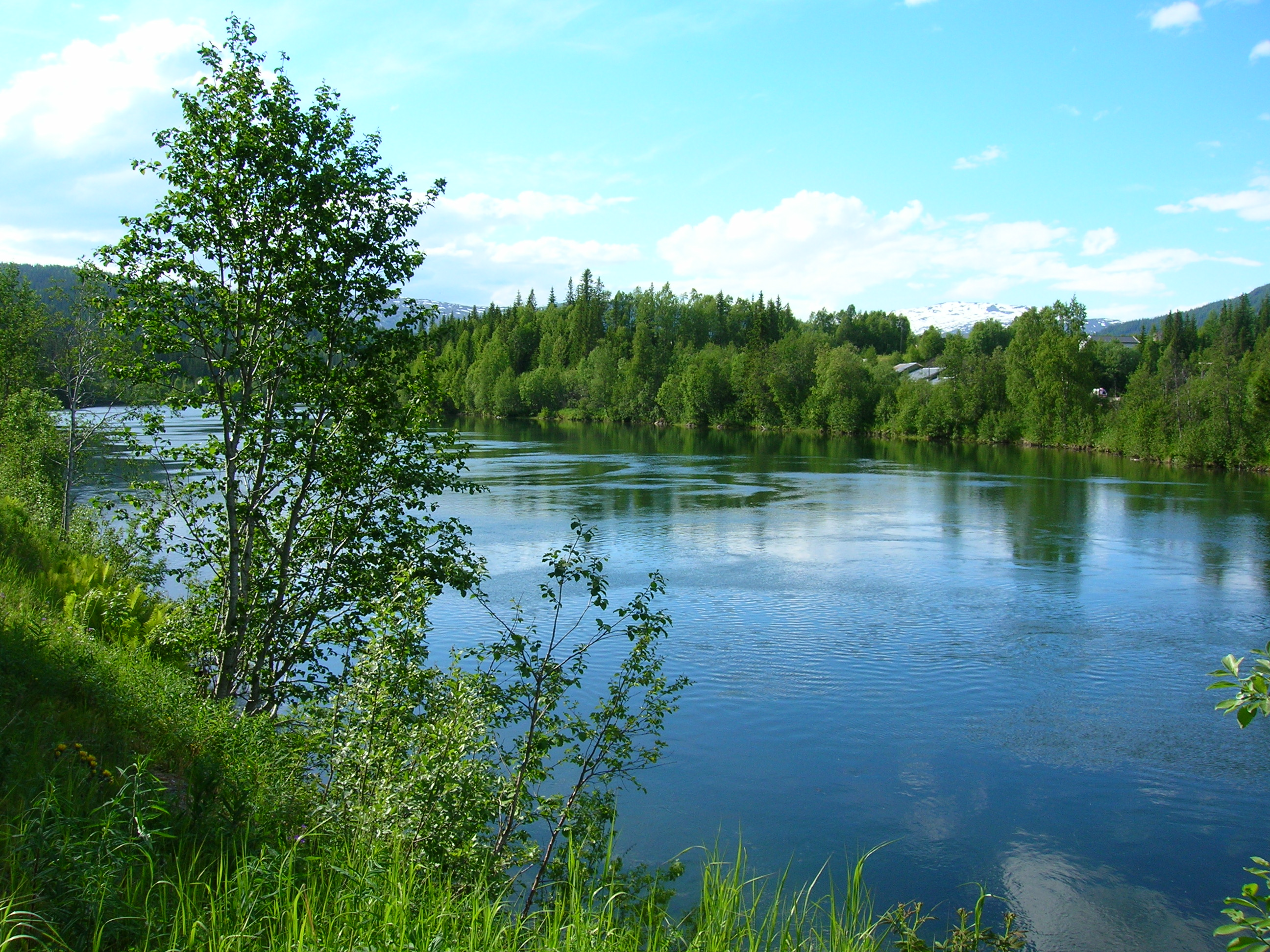
- Langvassåga west of the bridge
- Interactive map of the river

Location
- Country: Norway
- County: Nordland
- Municipalities: Rana Municipality

Physical characteristics
- Source: Langvatnet
  - location: Rana Municipality, Norway
  - coordinates: 66.3818257°N 14.2541416°E
  - elevation: 46 metres (151 ft)
- Mouth: Ranelva
  - location: Rana Municipality, Norway
  - coordinates: 66.3532831°N 14.3185419°E
  - elevation: 44 metres (144 ft)
- Length: 6.5 km (4.0 mi)
- Basin size: 1,114 km^{2} (430 sq mi)

Basin features
- River system: Ranelva

Langvassåga is a river that flows out of the lake Langvatnet in Rana Municipality in Nordland county, Norway. It flows in a southeastern direction and almost immediately, it is joined by the river Røvassåga. It then continues a short distance southwards before joining the main river Ranelva, just south of the village of Røssvoll. The Langvassåga catchment area covers about 1,114 square kilometres (430 sq mi). The river passes by the Mo i Rana Airport, Røssvoll.

== Media gallery ==
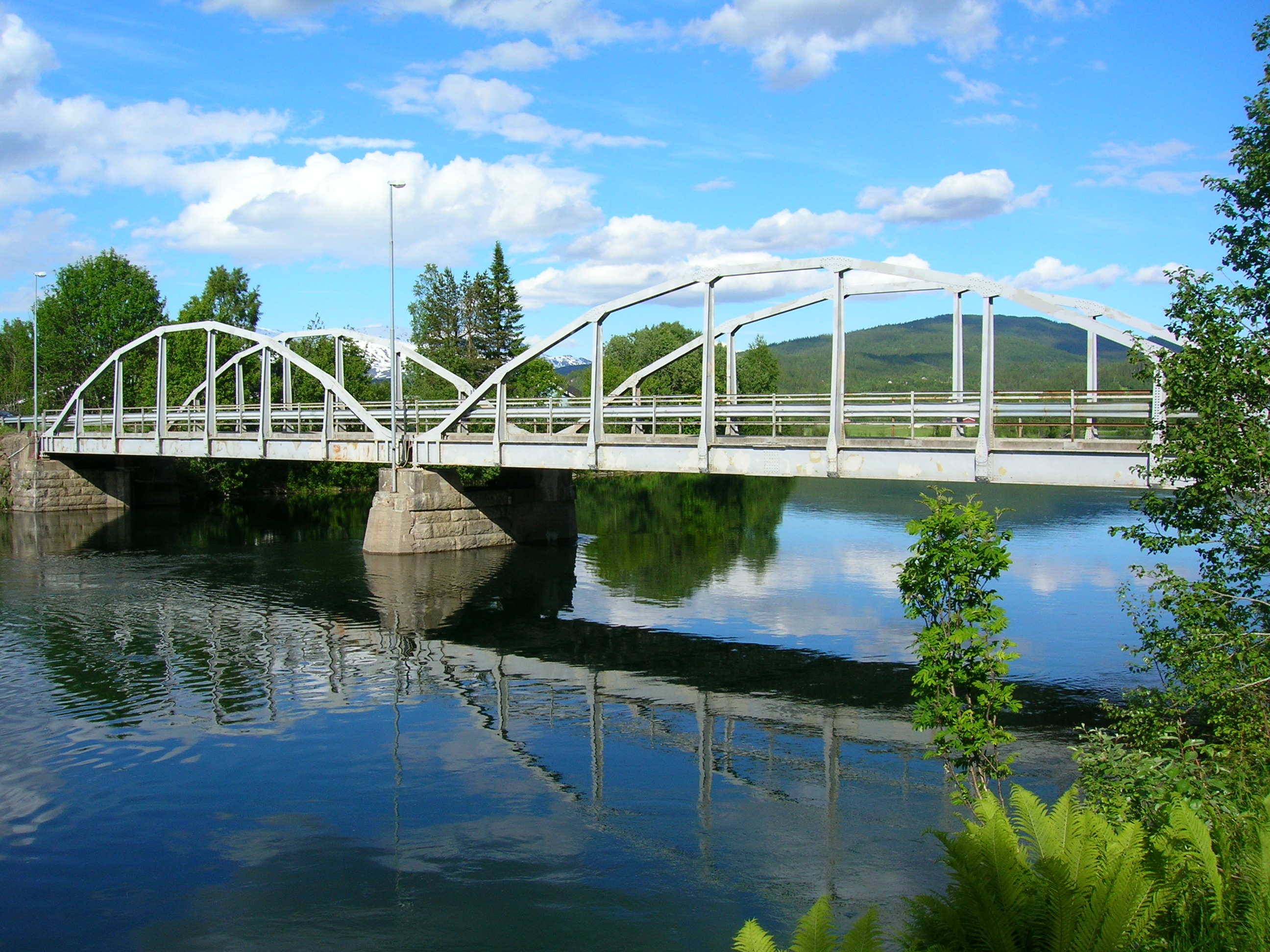
Bridge on E6 above Langvassåga just before it meets Ranelva

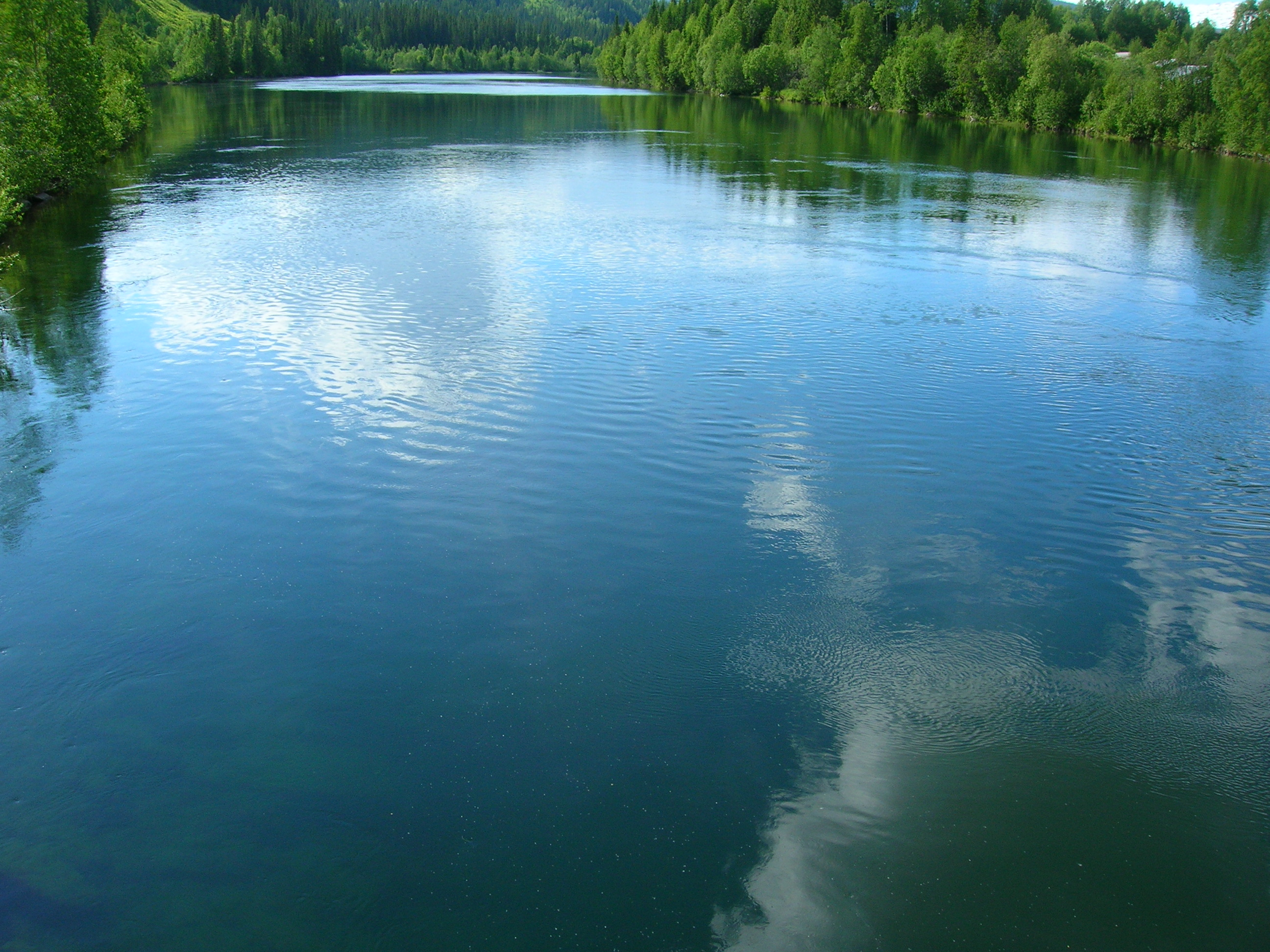
Langvassåga west of the bridge

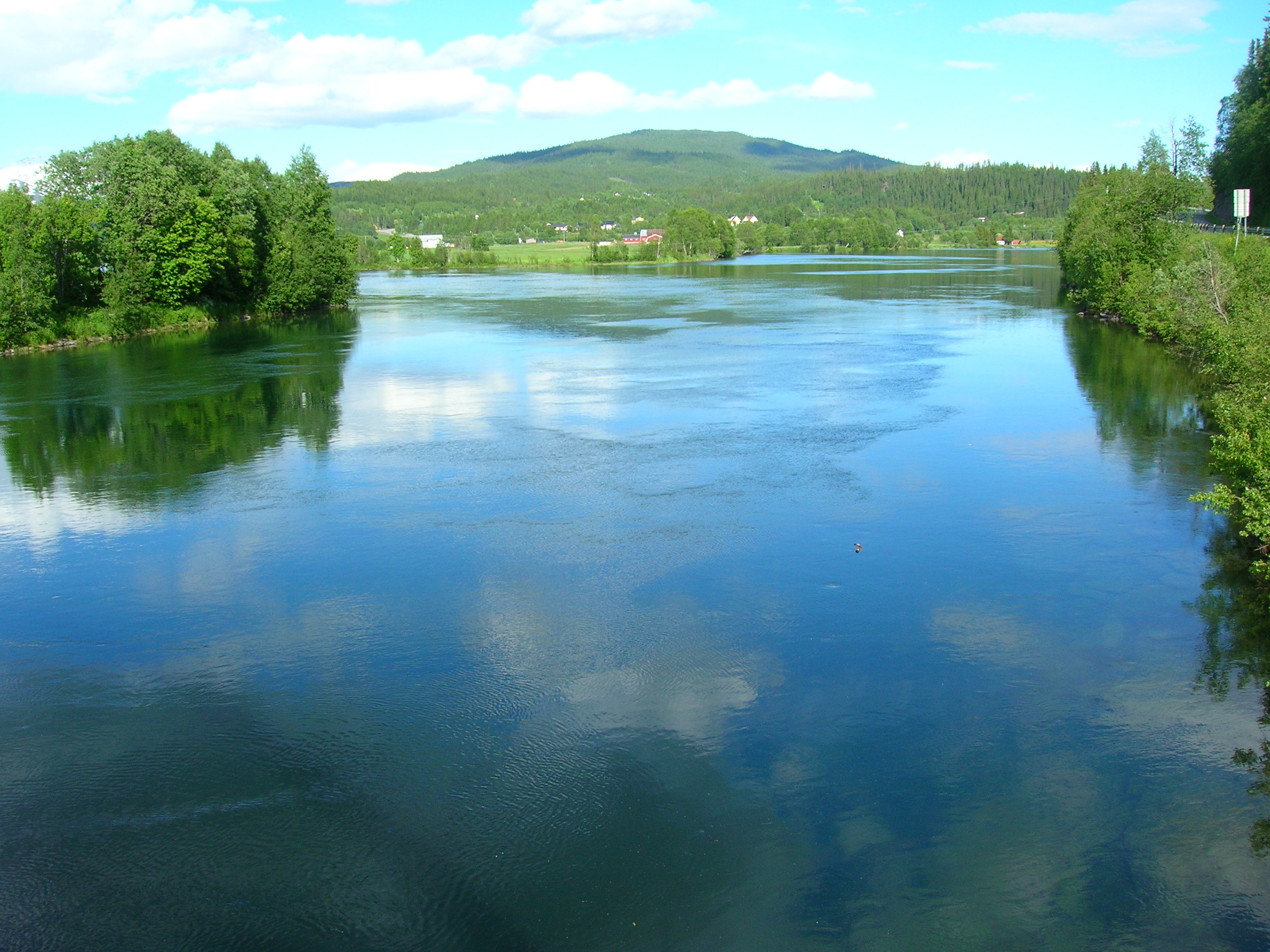
Langvassåga meets Ranelva east of the bridge

== See also ==
- List of rivers in Norway
