= Nordland =

County in Northern Norway

Nordland County Nordland fylke Nordlánda fylkka Nordlaante (Southern Sami) Nordlánda (Northern Sami)
- County
- Nordlandenes amt (historic name)
- Lofoten

- Flag Coat of arms

- Nordland within Norway
- Coordinates: 66°50′00″N 14°40′00″E
- Country: Norway
- County: Nordland
- District: Nord-Norge
- Established: 1662
- Administrative centre: Bodø

Government
  - Body: Nordland County Municipality
  - Governor (2019): Tom Cato Karlsen (FrP)
  - County mayor (2023): Eivind Holst (H)

Area
  - Total: 38,155 km^{2} (14,732 sq mi)
  - Land: 35,759 km^{2} (13,807 sq mi)
  - Water: 2,396 km^{2} (925 sq mi) 6.3%
  - Rank: #4 in Norway

Population (2021)
  - Total: 240,345
  - Rank: #11 in Norway
  - Density: 6.7/km^{2} (17/sq mi)
  - Change (10 years): ▲ +1.9%
- Demonym: Nordlending

Official language
  - Norwegian form: Neutral
- Time zone: UTC+01:00 (CET)
  - Summer (DST): UTC+02:00 (CEST)
- ISO 3166 code: NO-18
- Income (per capita): 128,600 kr (2001)
- GDP (per capita): 202,039 kr (2001)
- GDP national rank: #9 in Norway (3.15% of country)
- Website: Official website

Nordland (Norwegian pronunciation: [ˈnûːrlɑn]; Lule Sami: Nordlánnda, Southern Sami: Nordlaante, Northern Sami: Nordlánda, lit. 'Northland') is one of the three northernmost counties in Norway in the Northern Norway region, bordering Troms in the north, Trøndelag in the south, Norrbotten County in Sweden to the east, Västerbotten County to the south-east, and the Atlantic Ocean (Norwegian Sea) to the west. The county was formerly known as Nordlandene amt. The county administration is in the town of Bodø. The remote Arctic island of Jan Mayen has been administered from Nordland since 1995. In the southern part of the county is Vega, listed on the UNESCO World Heritage Site list.

== Districts ==
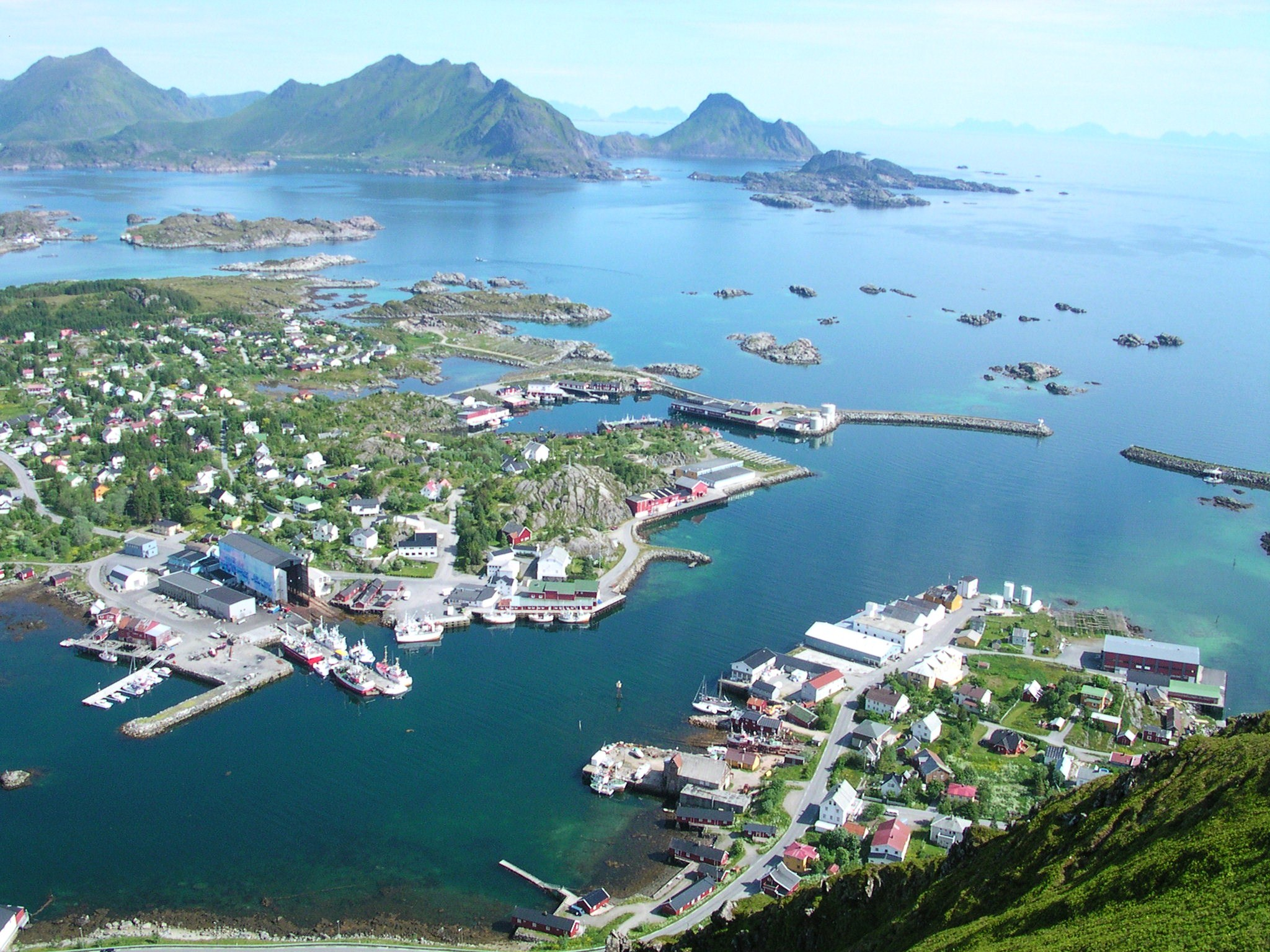
Ballstad in Lofoten

The county is divided into traditional districts. These are Helgeland in the south (south of the Arctic Circle), Salten in the centre, and Ofoten in the north-east. In the north-west lie the archipelagoes of Lofoten and Vesterålen.

== Geography ==
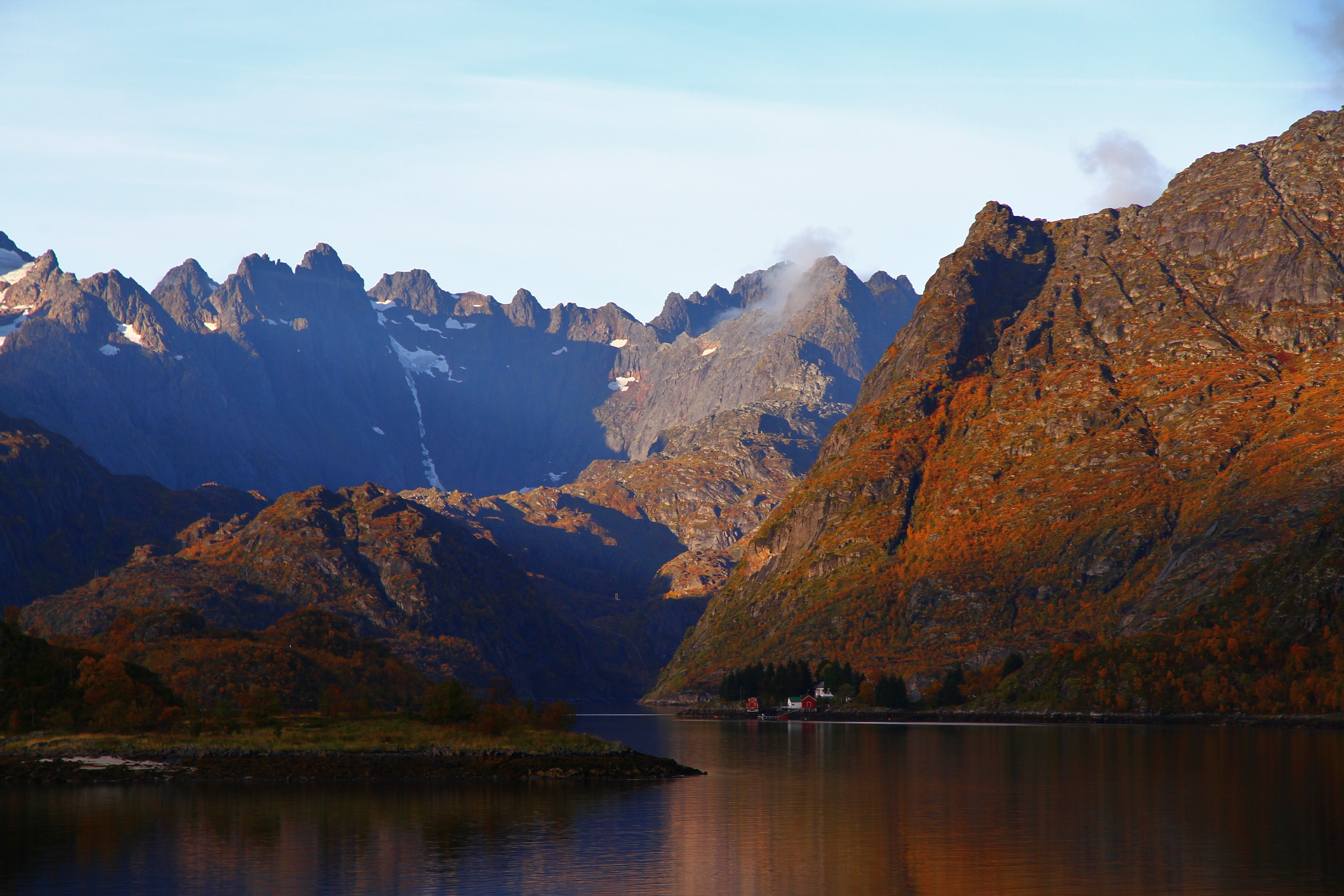
Autumn near Trollfjord in Hadsel Municipality. Nordland is home to innumerable fjords and fjord branches.

Nordland is located along the northwestern coast of the Scandinavian Peninsula in Northern Norway. Due to the large distance to the densely populated parts of Europe, this is one of the least polluted areas in Europe. Nordland extends about 500 kilometres (310 mi) from Trøndelag to Troms county. The distance by road from Bindal Municipality in the far south of the county to Andenes on the northern tip of Andøy Municipality in the northern edge of Nordland is roughly 800 kilometres (500 mi).

Nordland has a rugged coastline, with many fjords. From south to north, the main fjords are Bindalsfjord, Vefsnfjorden, Ranfjorden, Saltfjorden-Skjerstadfjorden, Folda, Tysfjorden, Ofotfjorden (the longest) and Andfjorden, which is shared with Troms county. The best-known is perhaps the Vestfjorden, which is not really a fjord, but an open stretch of sea between the Lofoten island group and the mainland. The Raftsundet strait, with its famous branch Trollfjorden, is the shortest waterway connecting Lofoten and Vesterålen. The continental shelf is very narrow west of Andenes, nowhere else in Norway is the deep ocean only a few kilometres from shore. Saltstraumen whirlpool is just south-east of Bodø, and Moskenstraumen is located in southern Lofoten.

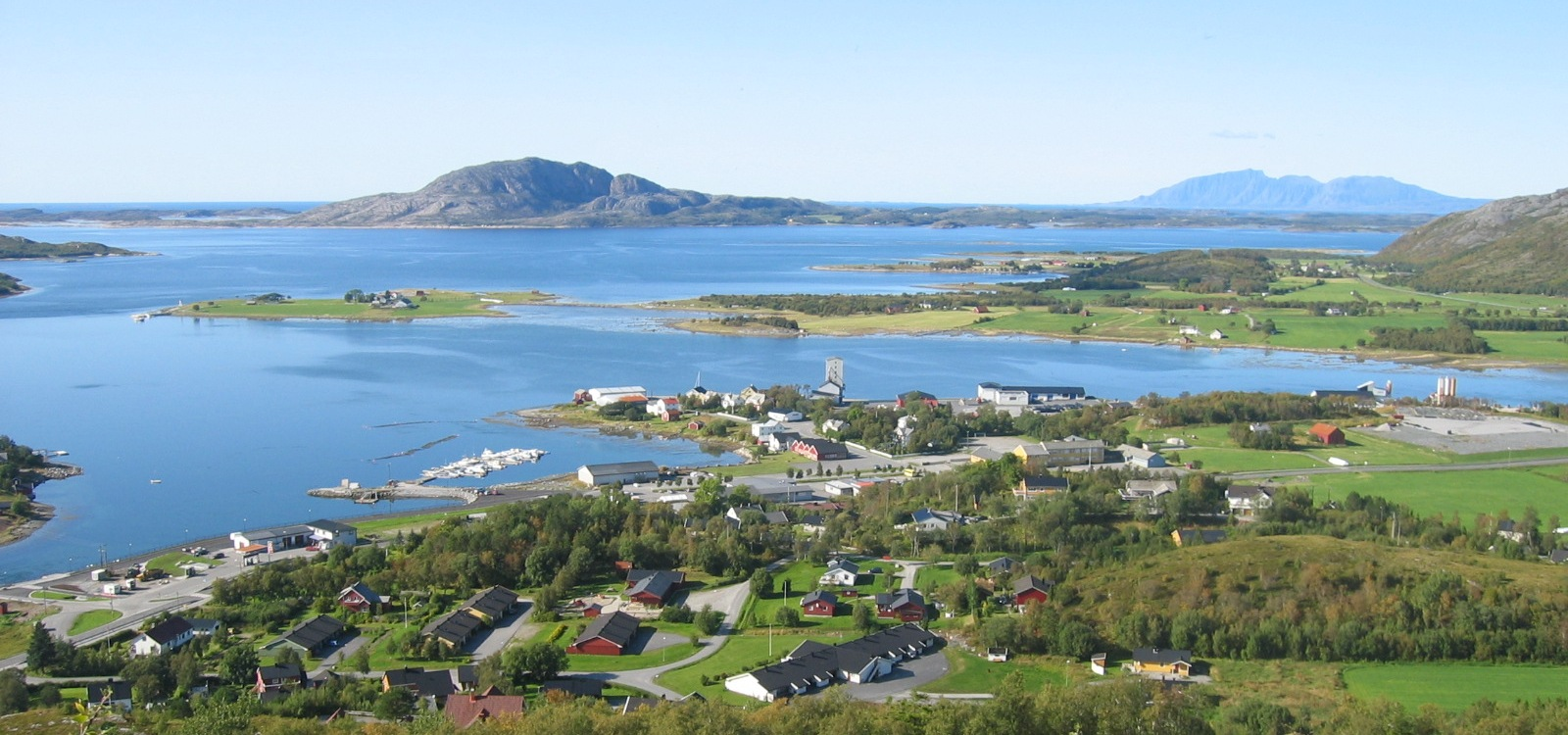
The majority of the population is located at the Strandflaten lowland. Berg in Sømna Municipality.

Steep mountains near the sea and an almost flat lowland area in between the mountains and the sea (Strandflaten, coastal brim) is very typical for the long coastline in Nordland, and Strandflaten often continues out from the shore, the result is numerous islands (skerries), of which Helgeland have thousands; these islands are usually mountainous, but with smaller or larger strandflate areas. The southern part of Norway's largest island (apart from Svalbard), Hinnøya is in Nordland, as is the third-largest island, Langøya. In the fjords, the coastal brim is much less developed: There might be a more gradual slope, with hills, towards the mountains, or no lowland at all. There are often valleys at the head of fjords (the fjord is an extension of the valley), usually with a river at the centre of the valley. Mo i Rana, Mosjøen, and Rognan are situated in such valleys.

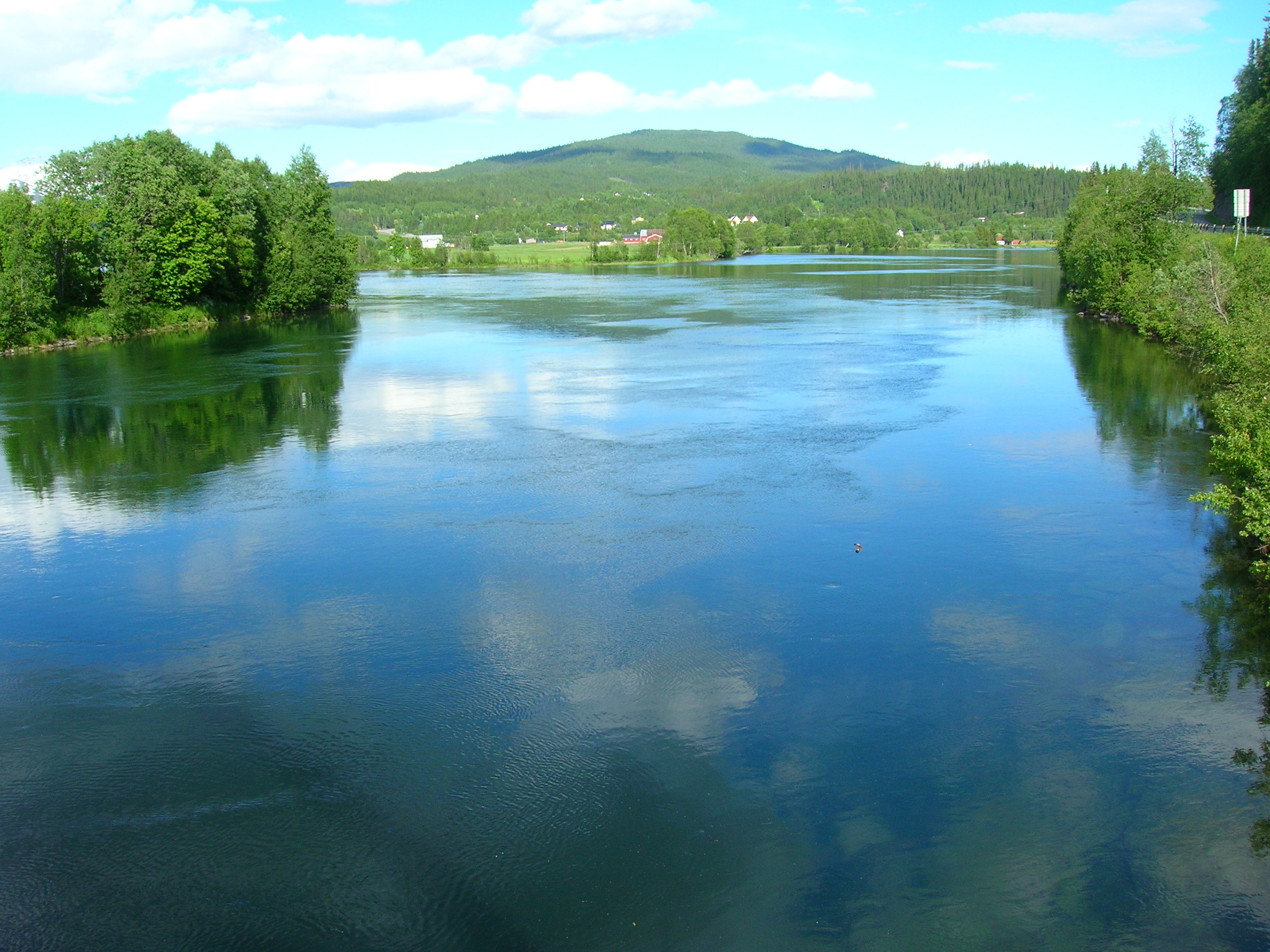
The largest rivers follow the longest inland valleys. Ranelva at the confluence with Langvassåga in Rana Municipality.

Norway's second-largest glacier, Svartisen, the second-largest lake, Røssvatnet, and the second-deepest fjord, Tysfjorden (897 m) are all located in Nordland. The largest river (waterflow) is Vefsna which forms the Laksforsen waterfall.

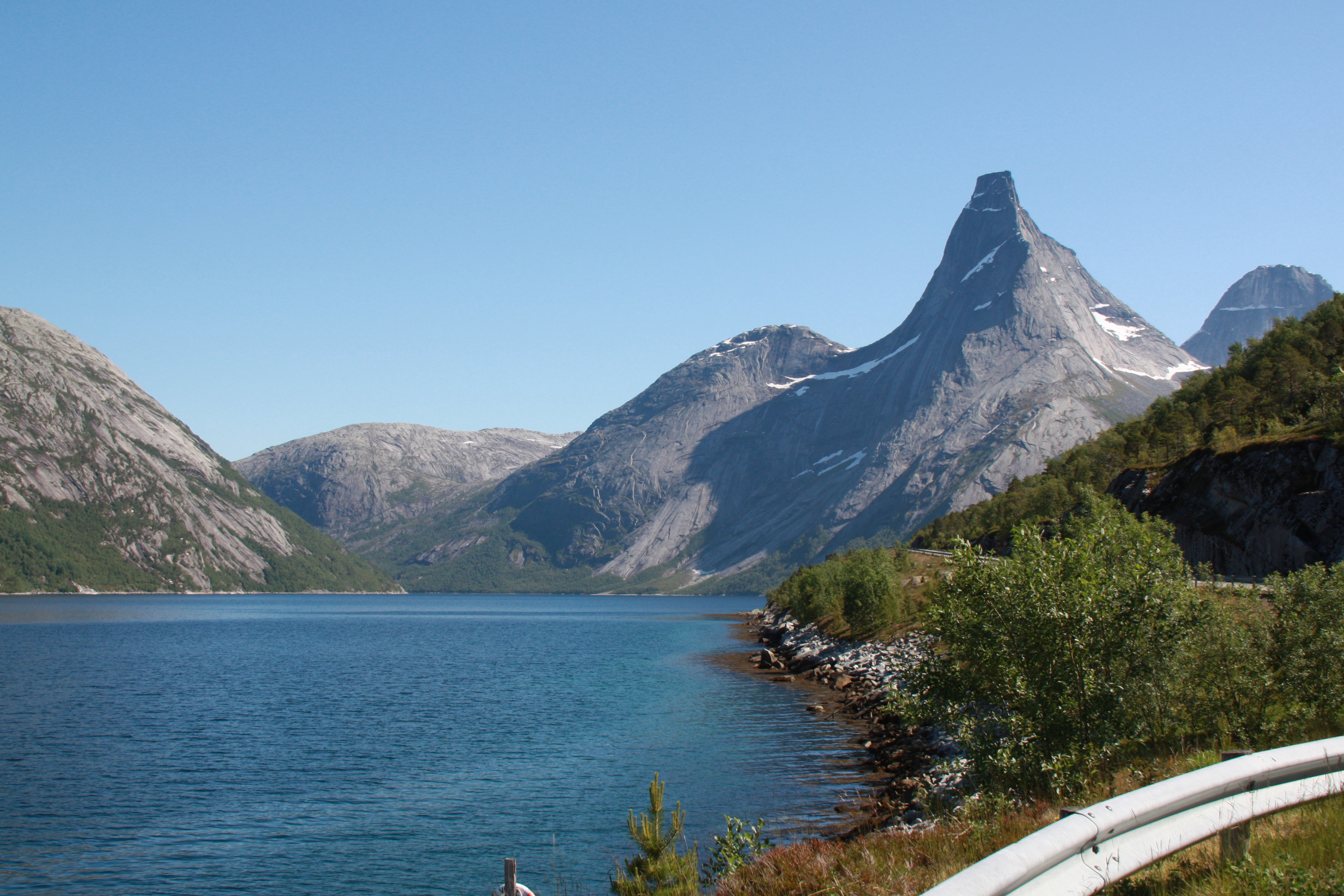
Stetinden towering over a branch of the Tysfjorden; voted Norway's national mountain.

The Saltfjellet mountain range forms a natural border between Helgeland and Salten, and is where the Arctic Circle cuts through the county. The western part of this mountain range is dominated by steep mountains and fjord inlets, with glaciers stretching towards the sea, while the eastern part of the mountains is more gentle and rounded, with some forested valleys, and is well suited for hiking. The interior of Nordland, towards the border with Sweden, is dominated by the Kjølen Mountains (Scandinavian Mountains). The highest mountain in Nordland is Oksskolten 1,915 metres (6,283 ft) in Okstindan range, the second-highest is Suliskongen 1,907 metres (6,257 ft) in Fauske Municipality, and the third is Storsteinfjellet 1,894 metres (6,214 ft) in Narvik Municipality. Stetinden in Narvik has been voted as Norway's national mountain.

There are many glaciers in the mountains, like Blåmannsisen, Okstindbreen, the Sulitjelma Glacier, and Frostisen—7 of the 15 largest glaciers in continental Norway are located in Nordland.

=== Geology ===
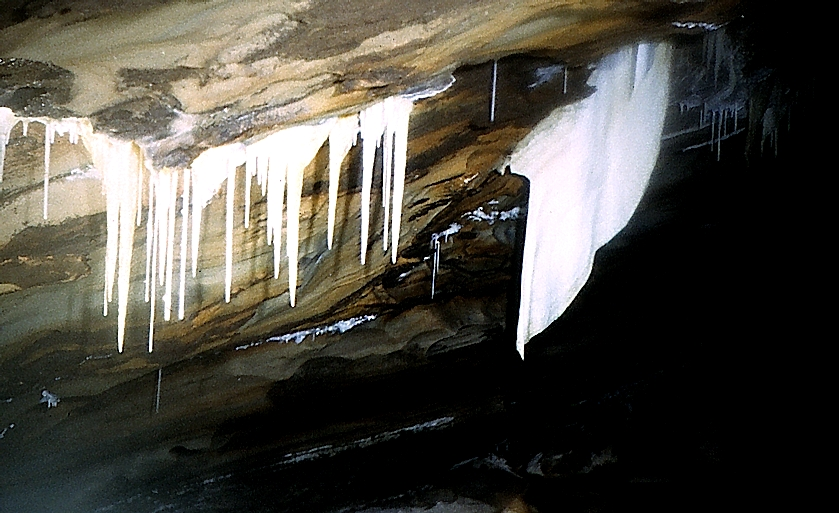
Inside Vikgrotta (cave) in Saltdal Municipality

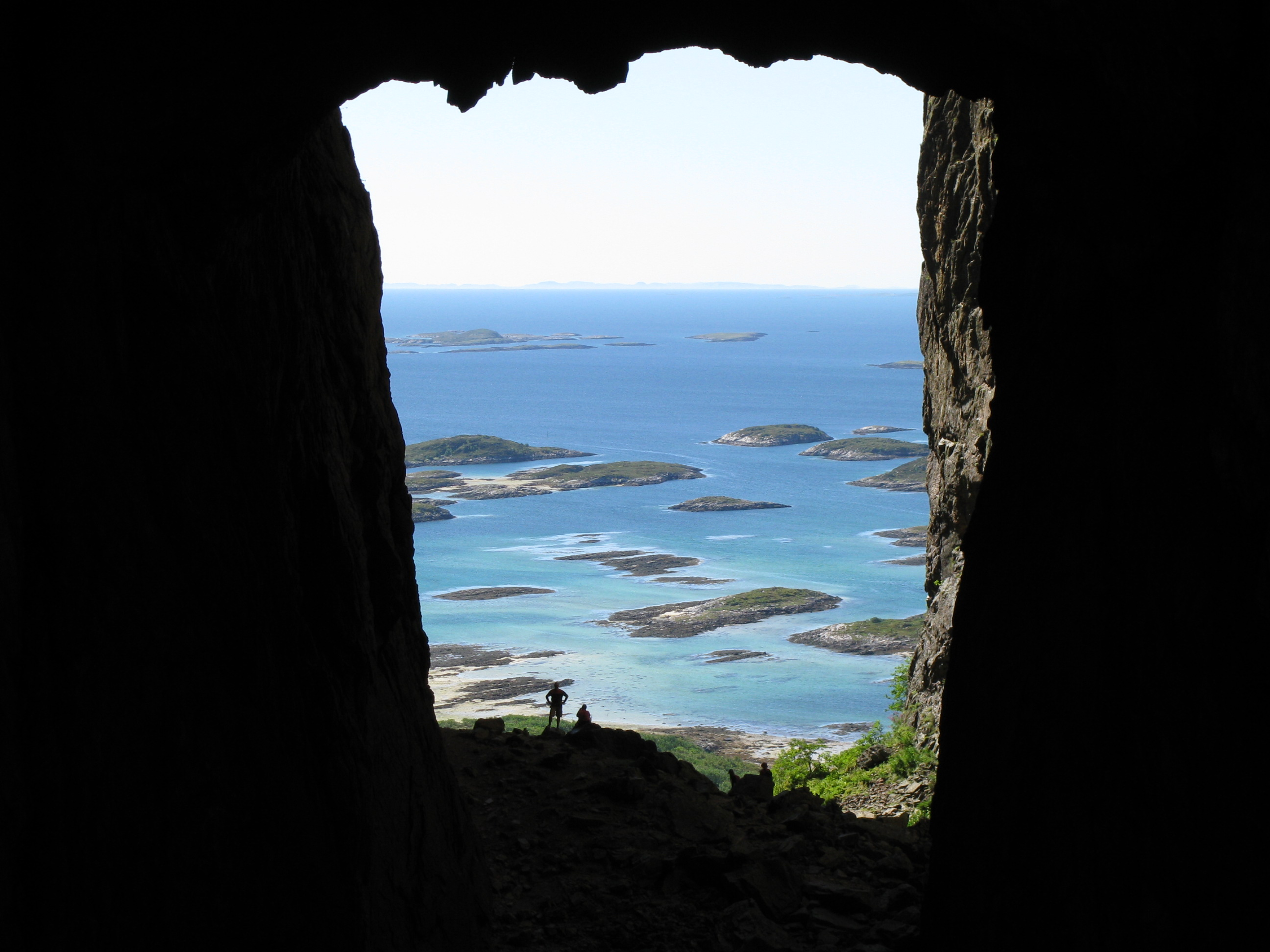
Torghatten, in Brønnøy Municipality, with its characteristic hole. July 2008.

In the geological past, a collision with Greenland pushed long slices of the seabed on top of the existing bedrock, today forming the bedrock from Dovrefjell and Trollheimen south of Trondheim stretching north in Trøndelag and through Nordland to just north of Tromsø. This Cambrian—Silurian bedrock, much of it mica schist, is by far the largest area in Norway with soft bedrock rich in nutritions good for plant growth. It forms the bedrock in the fjord areas, while the islands off the coast and some of the easternmost areas along the border with Sweden are made up of hard bedrock (usually granite). In some areas, as in Hamarøy Municipality and Sørfold Municipality, the bedrock is a mix of soft bedrock and hard granite.

Much of the Lofoten mountains are of precambrian eruptive origin and 3.5 billion years old, among the oldest on earth. The youngest rock in Norway is on Andøya, also known for its fossils of dinosaurs and other life forms. As the land was depressed by the ice sheet in the ice age, substantial areas in the lowest altitudes was beneath the surface of the sea for thousands of years acquiring marine deposits. Due to post-glacial rebound, this is now dry land, reaching 120 metres (390 ft) above sea level today in Saltdal, 100 metres (330 ft) in Narvik and Brønnøysund, and 30 metres (98 ft) to 50 metres (160 ft) in Lofoten and Vesterålen. Limestone is very common in Nordland, with many caves throughout the county, such as Grønligrotta in Rana. There are more caves in Rana Municipality than any other area in northern Europe. In August 2006 the Tjoarvekrajgge cave in Sørfold Municipality was explored and verified as the longest cave in Scandinavia 22 kilometres (14 mi) long); Raggejavreraige in Tysfjord is the deepest in Scandinavia and Svarthamarhola in Fauske Municipality has the largest cavity. There are more than 900 caves in Nordland, one of these have a 70 metres (230 ft) high waterfall. Marble is found in several locations. Fauske is sometimes referred to as the marble capital, and has exported marble worldwide (one customer being the UN building in New York City).

=== Climate ===
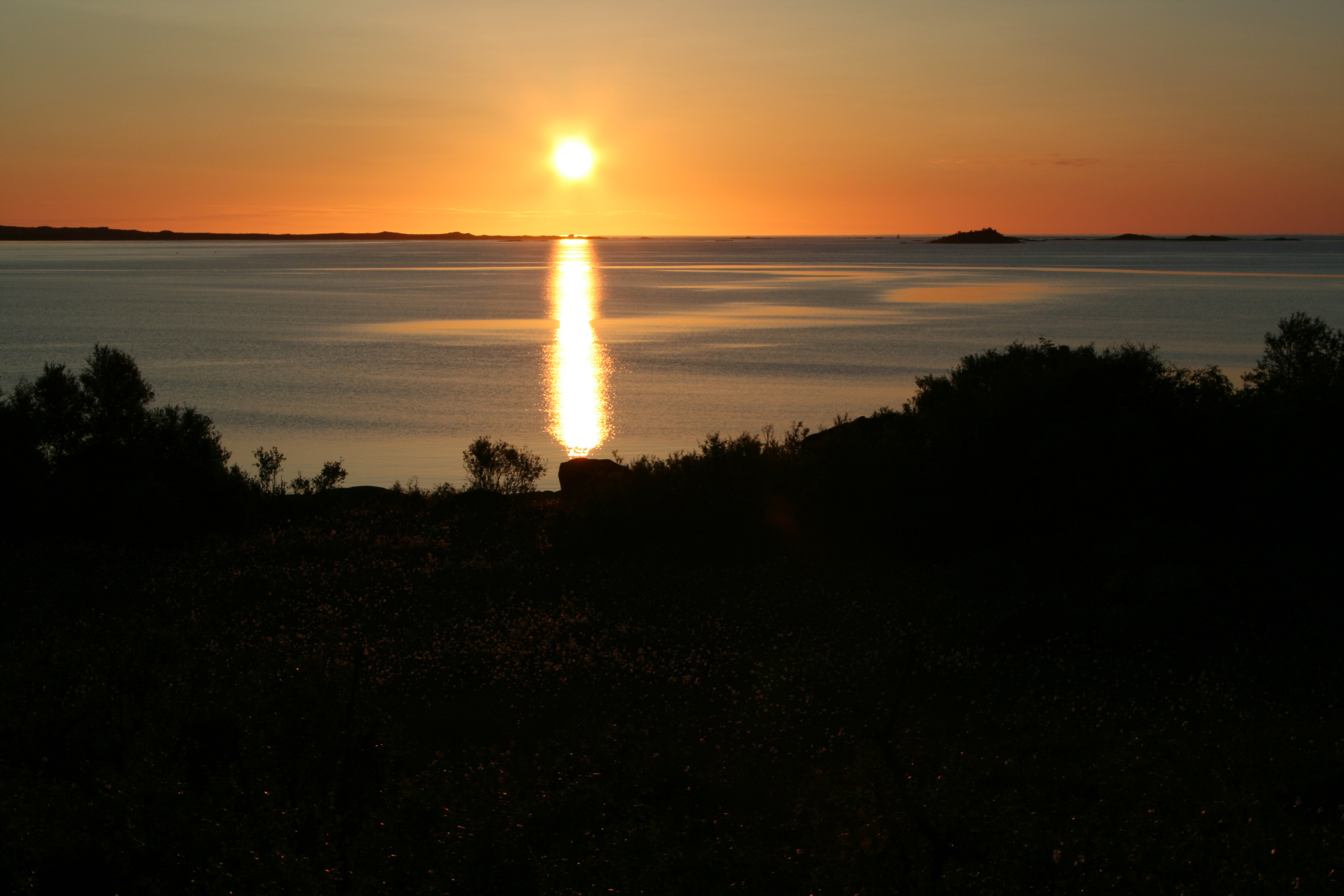
Midnight sun seen from Holm, Sortland Municipality.

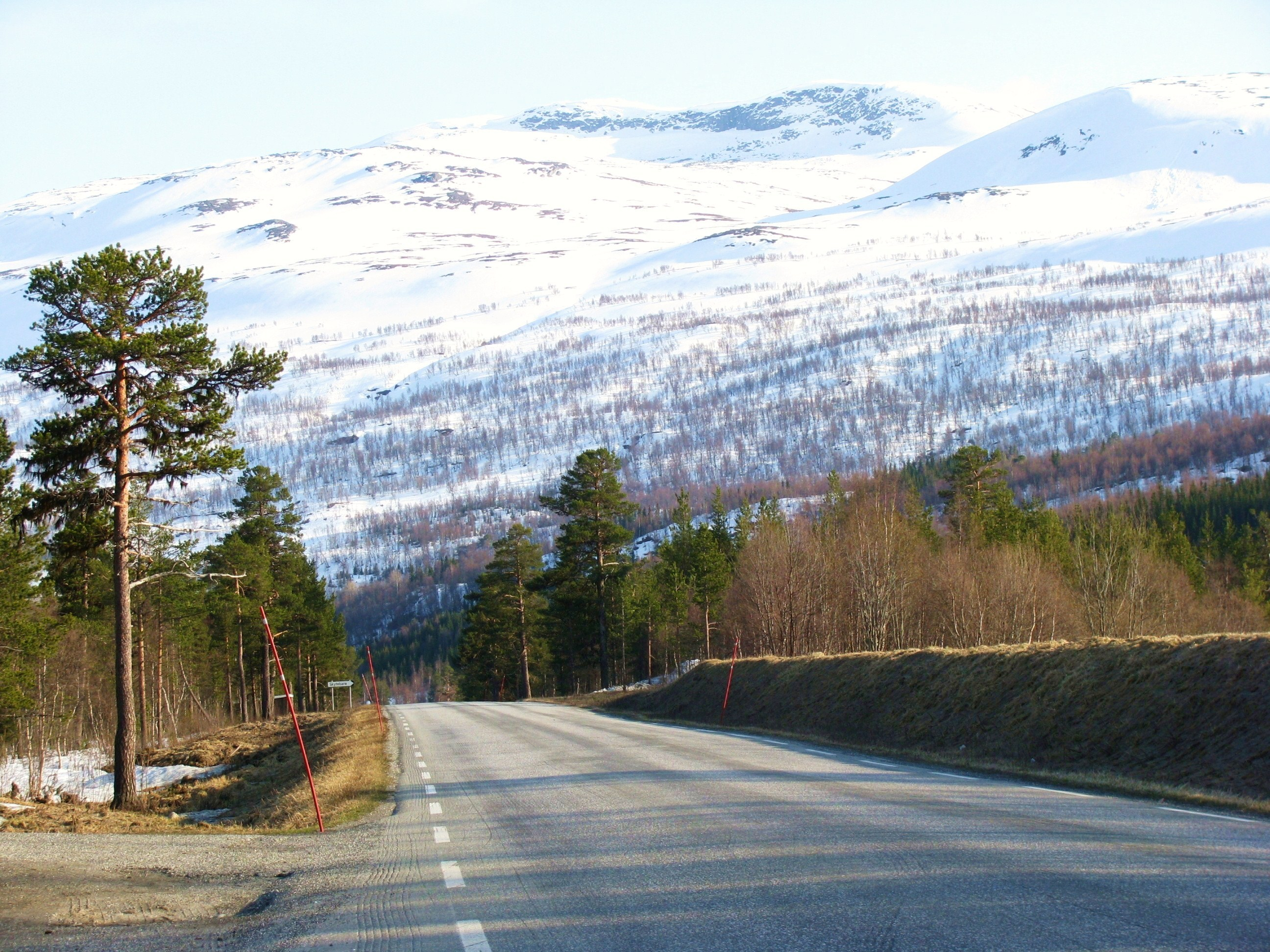
The Saltfjell mountains still snow-covered in May. Most areas except the outer seaboard have at least four months with snowfall; at least six months in the highlands, and all year in the highest mountains.

The largest area of Nordland, including fjord areas, inland areas and highlands below the treeline, the area is dominated by the boreal climate (Dfc), but an atypical oceanic variant with relatively mild winters, lack of permafrost, and often with autumn as wettest season. Towns with this climate include Mosjøen, Mo i Rana, Rognan, Fauske and Narvik. Along the coast and on islands (including Vega) along the southern and middle part of Nordland is a warmer, temperate oceanic climate (Cfb) with winter mean temperature above 0 °C (32 °F) and a four-month long summer. This includes Brønnøysund, Sandnessjøen and some islands north to Skrova. Just inland of this is a narrow area with coldest winter month mean temperature just below 0 °C (32 °F) but still a four-month long summer, this area has a humid continental climate (Dfb), and includes the county seat Bodø.

On the outer islands from Myken in Rødøy Municipality in the south and north including most of Lofoten and Vesterålen, the summers become slightly shorter; winter months are still relatively mild (above −3 °C (27 °F); some areas above 0 °C (32 °F) like Værøy Municipality and Bø Municipality), making this an area with subpolar oceanic climate (Cfc). Towns within this area includes Leknes, Stokmarknes, Sortland and Andenes.

The strongest climate gradient in Nordland is seen in winter, as the interior inland away from the fjords, as well as mountains, have much colder winters than the coast. Large fjords bring with them significant oceanic moderation in winter temperatures to the surrounding land area, as seen in Fauske Municipality and Narvik Municipality. Temperatures will generally drop 0.7 °C (1.3 °F) as elevation increases by 100 metres (330 ft). Snow cover can persist all year at altitudes above 1,100 metres (3,600 ft) to 1,500 metres (4,900 ft). Annual snow accumulation can exceed 5 metres (16 ft) in the mountains, this is the main reason for the many glaciers in Nordland. With mountains in almost all areas, alpine tundra is common in Nordland.

Easterly winds give dry, sunny weather (the air must climb the Kjølen mountains), with warmth in summer and cold, clear air in winter. Southwesterly winds are common, bringing moist and mild air from the Atlantic Ocean. Autumn and winter is the wettest season along the coast of Nordland, while April–June on average is the driest. The strongest winds occur in late autumn and winter, as the Atlantic low-pressure systems are strongest then. High-pressure weather can occur in all seasons, and in summer this brings 24-hour sunshine north of the Arctic Circle.

Lurøy Municipality 115 metres (377 ft), west of Saltfjell, averages 3,066 millimetres (120.7 in) precipitation annually; the wettest location in North Norway and in the world at such high latitude. Some of the wettest areas along the coast (a narrow band) north to Glomfjord fulfills the climatic criteria for a temperate rainforest. East of the mountains, upper part of Saltdal Municipality has an annual precipitation less than 300 millimetres (12 in).

Many locations in Nordland have recorded what Norwegians know as "tropical nights" when the overnight low does not fall below 20 °C (68 °F). The warmest night ever recorded in Norway was 29 July 2019 at Sømna-Kvaløyfjellet 302 metres (991 ft) in Sømna Municipality near Brønnøysund with overnight low 26.1 °C (79.0 °F).

The warmest temperature recorded in Nordland is 35 °C (95 °F) recorded 27 July 2019 at Mosjøen Airport, this is also a tie with the national high for July. On the same day, Laksfors south of Mosjøen recorded 35.6 °C (96.1 °F) but this recording was not approved due to too much vegetation and gravel near the weather station. Also on the same day, Saltdal Municipality recorded 34.6 °C (94.3 °F), this is the warmest temperature ever recorded in Norway north of the Arctic Circle.

The warmest month recorded in Nordland was July 2014 with mean 19.3 °C (66.7 °F) at Mosjøen airport and Mo i Rana airport, while the warmest average daily high was at Laksfors with 26.6 °C (79.9 °F) the same month. The coldest low ever recorded in Nordland is −44.5 °C (−48.1 °F) on 30 December 1978 in Svenningdal valley in Grane Municipality.

Climate data for Brønnøysund Airport 1991–2020 (9 m, precipitation 1961–90, extremes 1873-2020 includes earlier stations)
| Month | Jan | Feb | Mar | Apr | May | Jun | Jul | Aug | Sep | Oct | Nov | Dec | Year |
|---|---|---|---|---|---|---|---|---|---|---|---|---|---|
| Record high °C (°F) | 10.2 (50.4) | 10.9 (51.6) | 14.7 (58.5) | 21.1 (70.0) | 27.2 (81.0) | 30.3 (86.5) | 32.1 (89.8) | 30.1 (86.2) | 24.6 (76.3) | 20.3 (68.5) | 17.6 (63.7) | 12.2 (54.0) | 32.1 (89.8) |
| Mean daily maximum °C (°F) | 2 (36) | 2 (36) | 4 (39) | 8 (46) | 12 (54) | 15 (59) | 18 (64) | 17 (63) | 14 (57) | 9 (48) | 6 (43) | 4 (39) | 9 (49) |
| Daily mean °C (°F) | 1.1 (34.0) | 0.4 (32.7) | 1.4 (34.5) | 4.7 (40.5) | 8.1 (46.6) | 11.2 (52.2) | 14.3 (57.7) | 14 (57) | 11.1 (52.0) | 6.8 (44.2) | 4 (39) | 1.9 (35.4) | 6.6 (43.8) |
| Mean daily minimum °C (°F) | 0 (32) | −1 (30) | −1 (30) | 2 (36) | 5 (41) | 9 (48) | 12 (54) | 12 (54) | 9 (48) | 5 (41) | 2 (36) | 1 (34) | 5 (40) |
| Record low °C (°F) | −17.1 (1.2) | −18.4 (−1.1) | −15.5 (4.1) | −10.1 (13.8) | −5 (23) | 0 (32) | 1 (34) | 1.1 (34.0) | −4.4 (24.1) | −5.2 (22.6) | −11.3 (11.7) | −18.2 (−0.8) | −18.4 (−1.1) |
| Average precipitation mm (inches) | 138 (5.4) | 102 (4.0) | 114 (4.5) | 97 (3.8) | 66 (2.6) | 83 (3.3) | 123 (4.8) | 113 (4.4) | 180 (7.1) | 192 (7.6) | 145 (5.7) | 157 (6.2) | 1,510 (59.4) |
Source 1: yr.no - Meteorologisk Institutt
Source 2: Weatheronline.co.uk

Climate data for Harstad/Narvik Airport, Evenes 1991–2020 (26 m, precipitation 1961–90, extremes 2002–2024)
| Month | Jan | Feb | Mar | Apr | May | Jun | Jul | Aug | Sep | Oct | Nov | Dec | Year |
|---|---|---|---|---|---|---|---|---|---|---|---|---|---|
| Record high °C (°F) | 10 (50) | 8 (46) | 11 (52) | 19 (66) | 27.9 (82.2) | 28.7 (83.7) | 32.2 (90.0) | 30.8 (87.4) | 23.7 (74.7) | 19.1 (66.4) | 13 (55) | 10.1 (50.2) | 32.2 (90.0) |
| Mean daily maximum °C (°F) | −2 (28) | −1 (30) | 1 (34) | 6 (43) | 11 (52) | 14 (57) | 17 (63) | 16 (61) | 12 (54) | 7 (45) | 2 (36) | 0 (32) | 7 (45) |
| Daily mean °C (°F) | −3.5 (25.7) | −3.9 (25.0) | −2 (28) | 1.8 (35.2) | 6.4 (43.5) | 10.1 (50.2) | 13.3 (55.9) | 12.2 (54.0) | 8.5 (47.3) | 3.5 (38.3) | 0.2 (32.4) | −2.3 (27.9) | 3.7 (38.6) |
| Mean daily minimum °C (°F) | −6 (21) | −6 (21) | −6 (21) | −1 (30) | 4 (39) | 7 (45) | 10 (50) | 9 (48) | 6 (43) | 2 (36) | −2 (28) | −4 (25) | 1 (34) |
| Record low °C (°F) | −25.5 (−13.9) | −24 (−11) | −24.2 (−11.6) | −20.6 (−5.1) | −6.6 (20.1) | 0.1 (32.2) | 4.2 (39.6) | −0.3 (31.5) | −4.9 (23.2) | −9.8 (14.4) | −20.9 (−5.6) | −24.5 (−12.1) | −25.5 (−13.9) |
| Average precipitation mm (inches) | 108 (4.3) | 100 (3.9) | 74 (2.9) | 68 (2.7) | 53 (2.1) | 65 (2.6) | 75 (3.0) | 89 (3.5) | 106 (4.2) | 155 (6.1) | 107 (4.2) | 120 (4.7) | 1,120 (44.1) |
Source 1: Norwegian Meteorological Institute
Source 2: Weatheronline climate robot (avg highs/lows)

Research using sediment in lakes near the Okstind Glacier has shown that the summer climate in Nordland was up to 2.5 °C (4.5 °F) warmer 9,000 to 6,000 years ago, and then slowly cooled—it was 0.5 °C (0.90 °F) warmer 2,000 years before present (see Holocene climatic optimum). This research also concluded that the eastern Okstind Glacier did not melt completely during this warm period, the first glacier in Norway known to have survived since the Ice age.

== Light ==
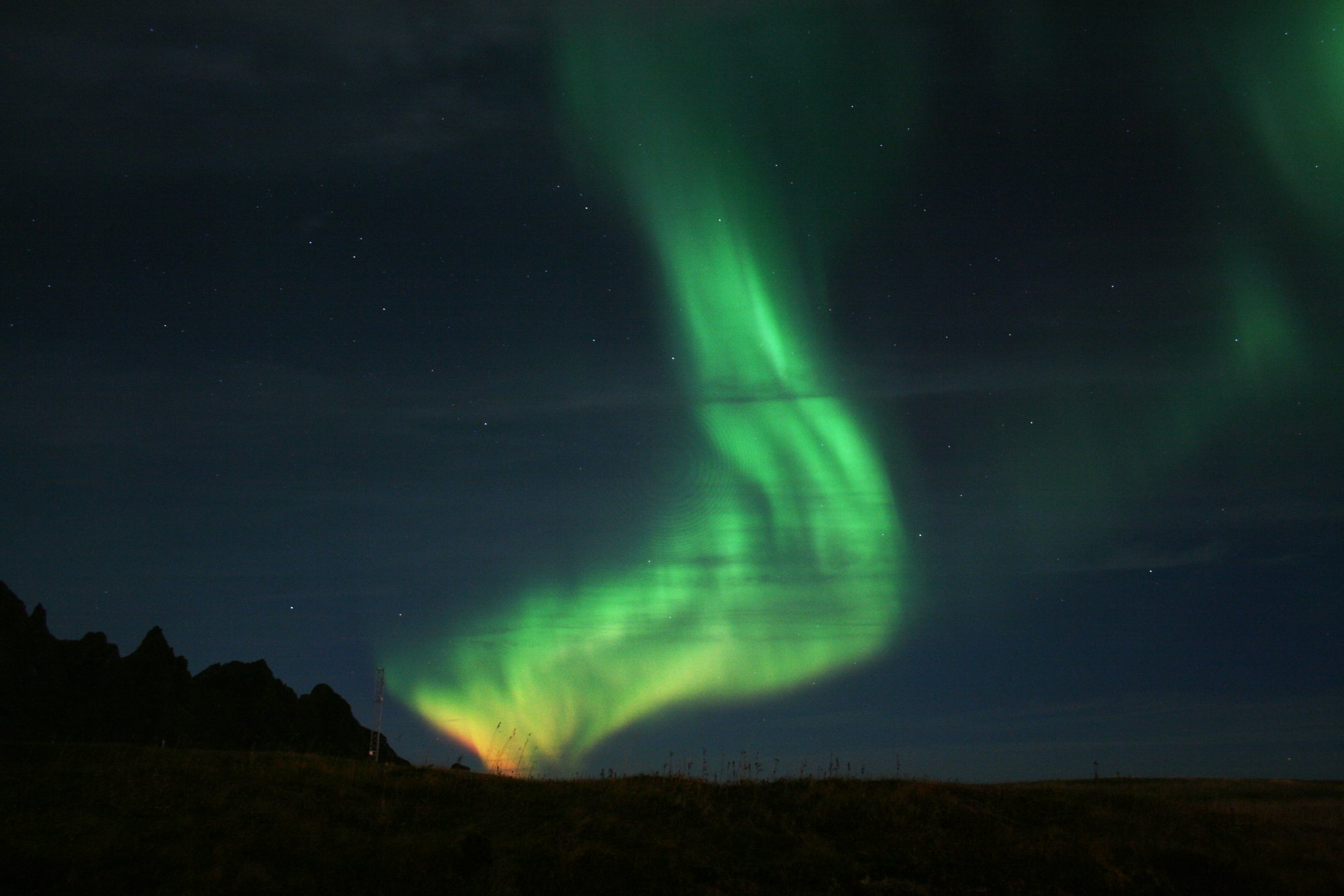
The Aurora Borealis can be seen in much of the year, but not in summer. Andøy, October 2007.

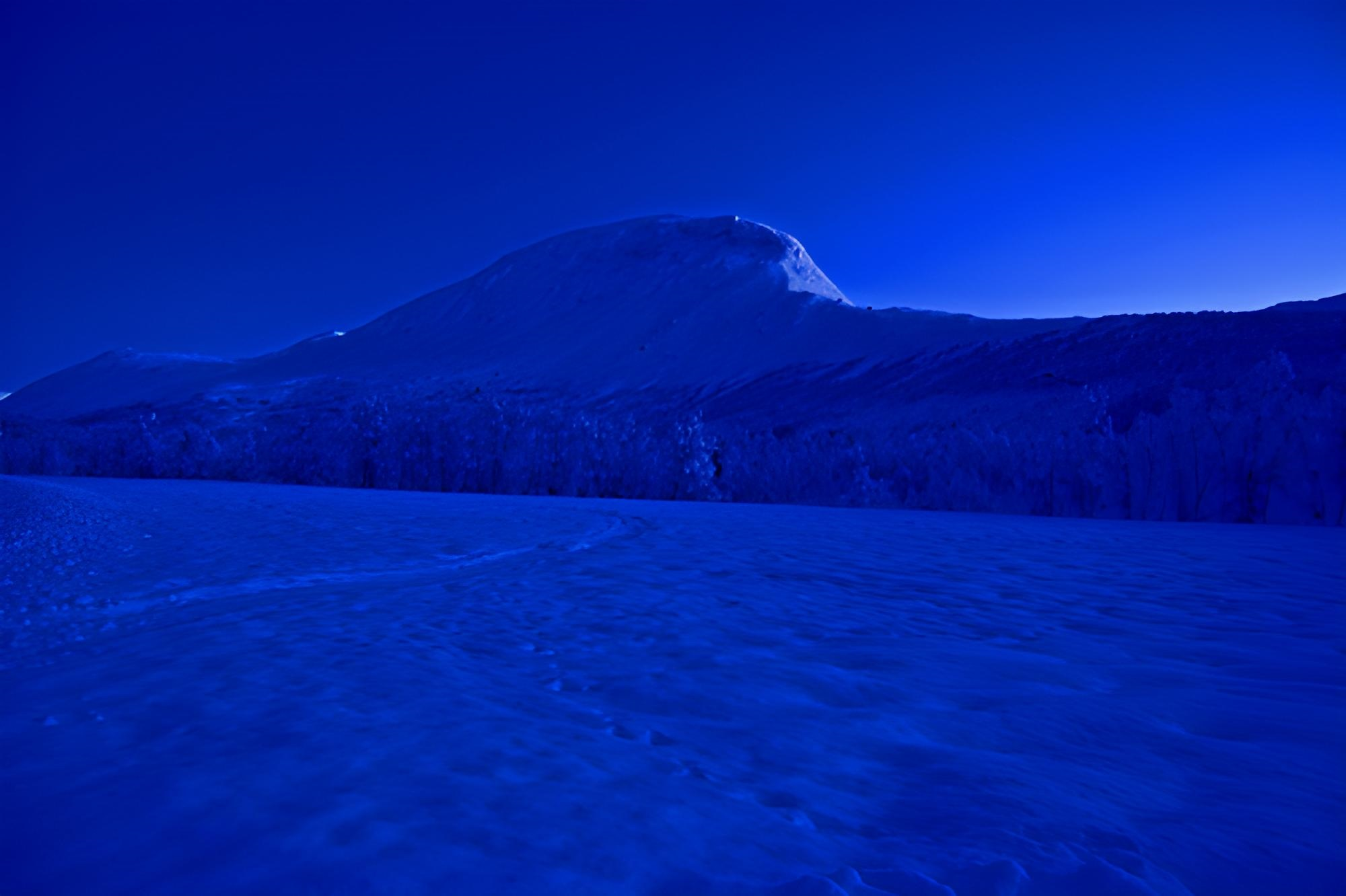
Bluish light in the mountains just before 15:00 in mid-January

The light conditions vary considerably from north to south; Andenes in the north will have midnight sun from 22 May to 20 July, and the sun is below the horizon from 28 November to 16 January (Narvik daylight). In Bodø, the sun is above the horizon from 3 June to 8 July. Helgeland is situated south of the Arctic Circle; at the winter solstice the sun is above the horizon approximately 3 hours a day (Mosjøen daylight). There is not a true midnight sun in Helgeland, although the upper part of the sun disc will be above the horizon all night in June as far south as Mosjøen. With the transitional period with a short dusk included, there are three full months (from early May to early August) without darkness in Nordland.

In Laukvik is the polarlightcenter, with lots of information about the Aurora Borealis (polarlight).

| Month | Jan | Feb | Mar | Apr | May | Jun | Jul | Aug | Sep | Oct | Nov | Dec |
|---|---|---|---|---|---|---|---|---|---|---|---|---|
| Bodø sunrise & sunset, 15. of the month | 10:18 - 14:05 | 08:16 - 16:18 | 06:24 - 18:02 | 05:16 - 20:51 | 03:06 - 22:56 | Midnight sun | 01:40 - 00:30 | 04:27 - 21:43 | 06:20 - 19:34 | 08:02 - 17:33 | 09:04 - 14:29 | 11:18 - 12:37 |
| Average sunhours in Bodø | 8 | 43 | 114 | 159 | 219 | 221 | 172 | 167 | 98 | 54 | 16 | 0.4 |
Source: Almanakk for Norge; University of Oslo, 2010. Sunhours:Norwegian Meteorologicial Institute. Note: The very low sun is blocked by mountains in December and the first week of January. In mid-July, the sun sets after midnight due to daylight savings.

== Wildlife ==
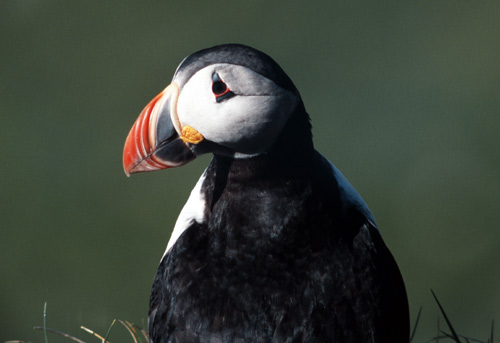
Røst Municipality has the largest seabird colonies along the Norwegian coast, including colonies of puffins.

The sea along the coast has a rich marine life, and the cod fisheries in Lofoten have lasted for more than 1,000 years. In addition to cod, coalfish, haddock, herring, wolf fish and halibut are all common along the coast and in the fjords. Nordland also features many lakes. The largest deep water coral reef (Lophelia pertusa) in the world, the Røst Reef, 40 kilometres (25 mi) long, is located west of Røst Municipality, and protected from trawling since 2003. The coast of Nordland has the highest density of white-tailed eagles in Europe.

Just off the coast, the islands of Røst Municipality have the largest colonies of seabirds in Norway. Røst offers a range of habitats and serves as a stop-over point for many birds that are migrating even further north. The municipality is home to one of the largest bird cliffs in the North Atlantic, where birdwatchers can find puffin, shag, kittiwake, and cormorant colonies.

Lovund also has a well-known colony of puffins.

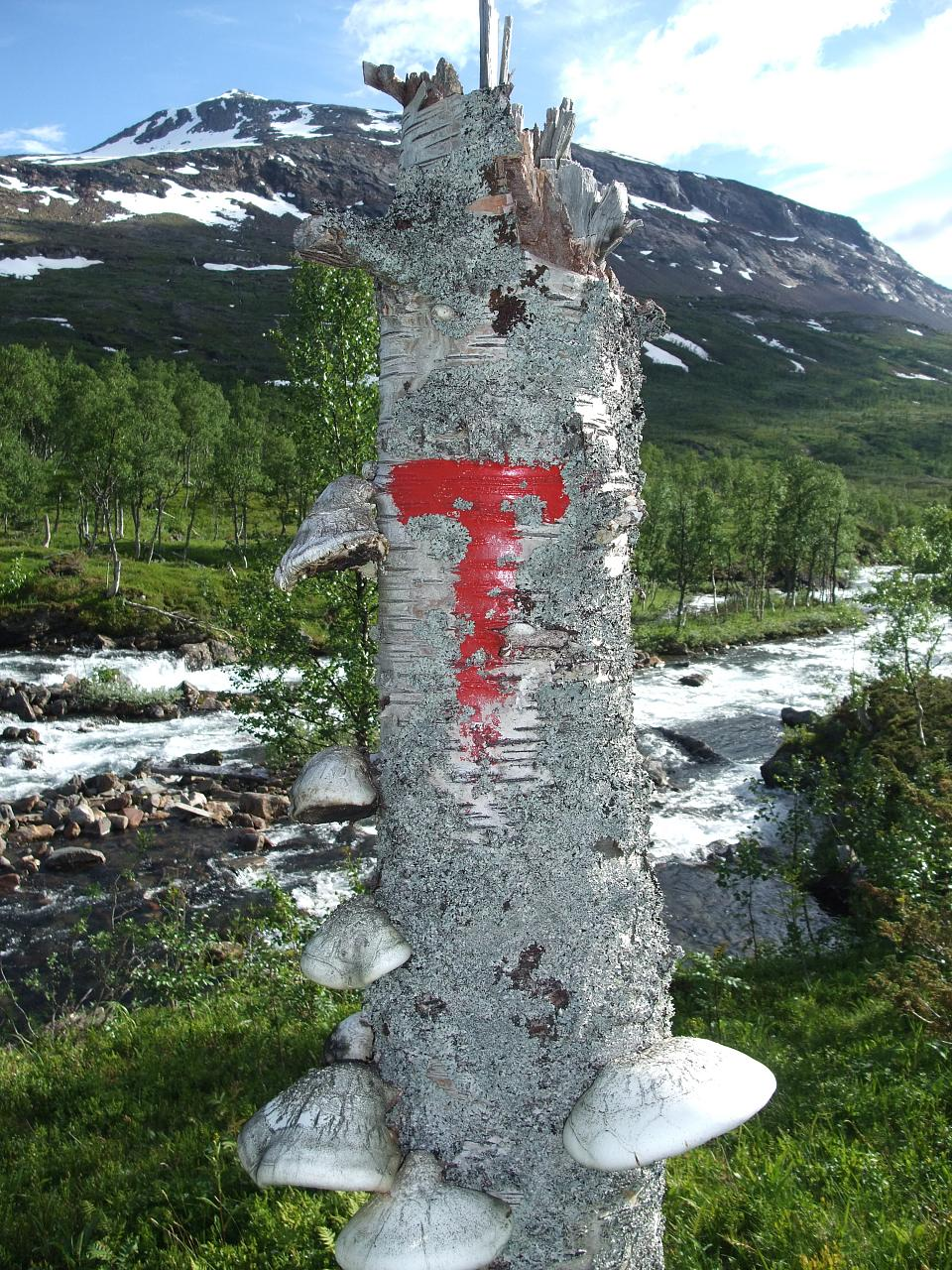
Marked hiking route in Junkerdal National Park.

Otters are very common along the coast and fjords, as are harbour porpoises, grey seals and harbour seals. The largest fish in the sea is the basking shark, which used to be hunted. The most frequent birds along the coast, common in all areas including the fjords, are gulls, Eurasian oystercatcher and Arctic terns, and the grey heron has also become common. The Eurasian eagle-owl has a stronghold along the Helgeland coast, whilst predatory birds like golden eagle, gyrfalcon, and peregrine falcon nest in some inaccessible areas. Orcas are common along the coast and in the Vestfjord area (even in the fjords) in winter, and the world's largest predator, the sperm whale, hunts for prey in the deep waters west of Andøya. Tysfjord and Folda fjord is home to the world's northernmost lobster population.

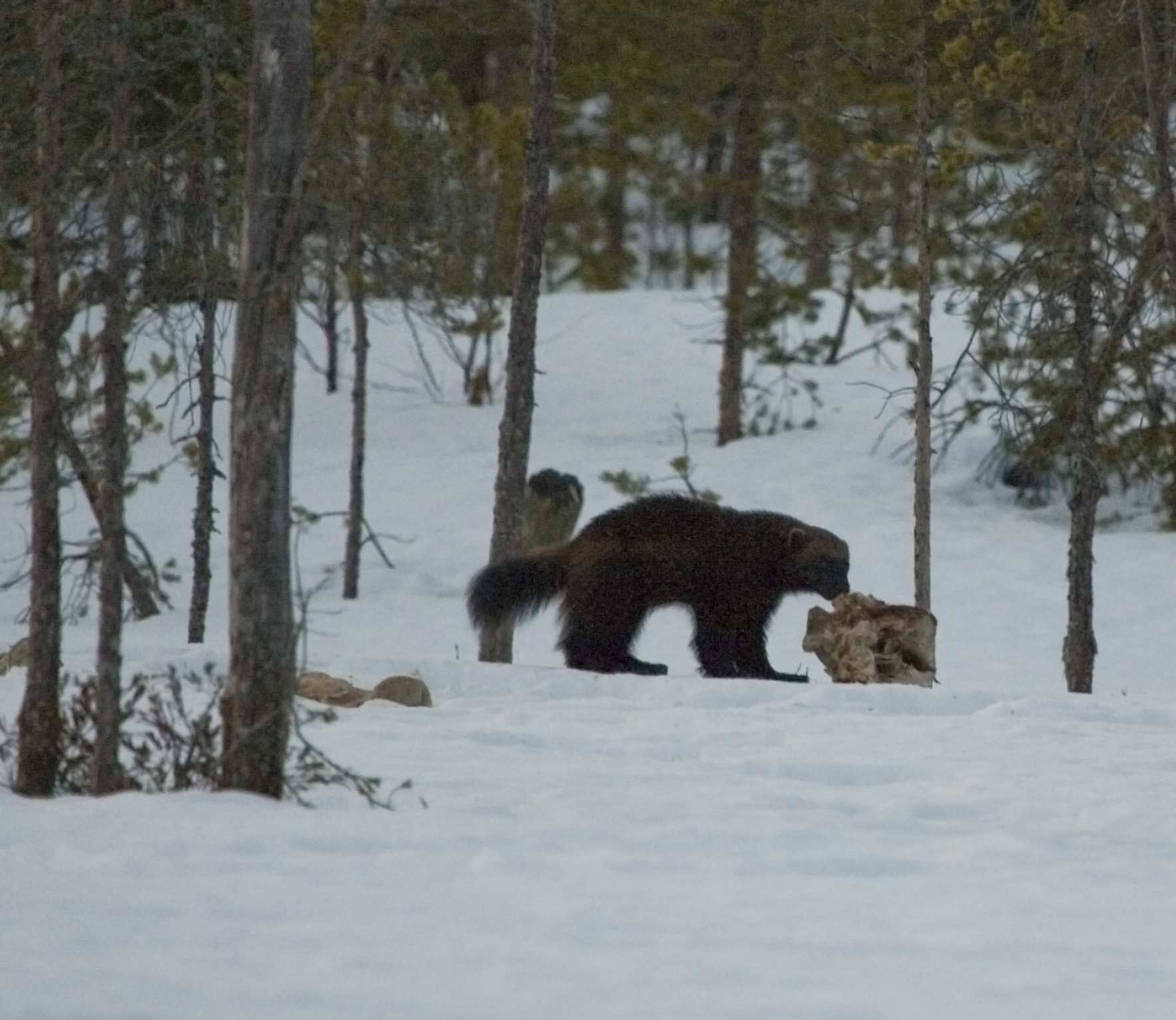
The long inland mountain range with alpine tundra and the subarctic forest is part of the core area for wolverine in western Europe.

Spruce forest expansion has been blocked by Saltfjell and Kjølen mountains, thus spruce forest naturally grows only in Helgeland, but are commonly planted in the whole county for economic reasons, sparking some debate. Sitka spruce is also commonly planted in Nordland, particularly in coastal areas. The coastal areas belong to the Scandinavian coastal conifer forests ecoregion; some small areas have been classified as rainforests using botanical criteria as well as precipitation data. Inland areas up to the conifer treeline belong to the Scandinavian and Russian taiga ecoregion, while the highlands and mountains belong to the Scandinavian Montane Birch forest and grasslands ecoregion.

Other common trees in Nordland are birch, rowan, willow, grey alder, bird cherry, aspen and Scots pine, more rarely seen is wych elm and common hazel (elm north to Beiarn Municipality, hazel north to Steigen Municipality, small-leaved lime north to Brønnøy Municipality, forest apple north to Moskenes Municipality). The Nordland whitebeam (Nordlandsasal) is one of very few endemic trees in Norway and only grows in Bindal Municipality in Nordland.

In the mountain areas in the interior, reindeer can be seen (these have Sami owners), hunted by the indigenous wolverine. There are also a few brown bears in the interior. The Arctic fox is now in danger of extinction on the mainland, but a few are left in these mountain areas, particularly in the mountains of Børgefjell National Park. Red foxes, moose, hares, red squirrels, small rodents, pine marten (inland valleys) and stoats are all common in the forests. As of 2008, there were a minimum of 50 European lynx in Nordland residing in the forests in all Nordland except Lofoten and Vesterålen. In lowland areas, roe deer now occur in most of Nordland, and red deer are seen in the southern part of Nordland. The badger and the common viper have their most northerly habitat in southerly coastal areas of Nordland. Grey wolves have been observed in inland areas of Helgeland. There are few species of amphibians, although the common frog is common in all Nordland except mountain areas and the smooth newt has its most northerly habitat in the world in the river Vefsna. There are seven national parks in, or partly in, Nordland. From south to north, these are Børgefjell National Park, Lomsdal–Visten National Park, Saltfjellet–Svartisen National Park, Junkerdal National Park, Rago National Park, Sjunkhatten National Park and Møysalen National Park. The national park centre for Nordland is situated in Saltdal.

== Economy ==
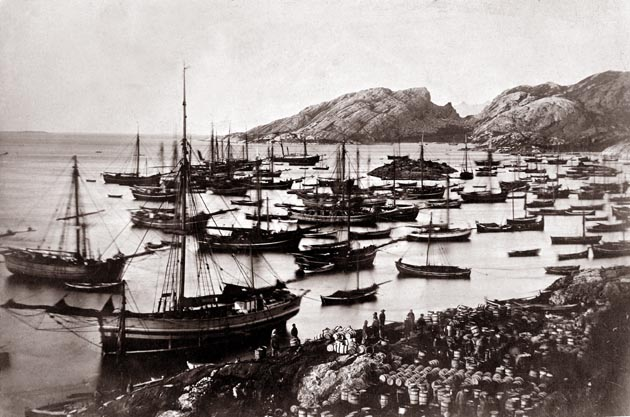
Herring fisheries could bring a large catch in a short time. The picture was taken around 1870.

Historical population
| Year | Pop. | ±% |
|---|---|---|
| 1951 | 221,809 | — |
| 1961 | 237,530 | +7.1% |
| 1971 | 240,951 | +1.4% |
| 1981 | 244,493 | +1.5% |
| 1991 | 239,403 | −2.1% |
| 2001 | 238,295 | −0.5% |
| 2011 | 237,280 | −0.4% |
| 2021? | 247,891 | +4.5% |
| 2031? | 254,897 | +2.8% |
Source: Statistics Norway.

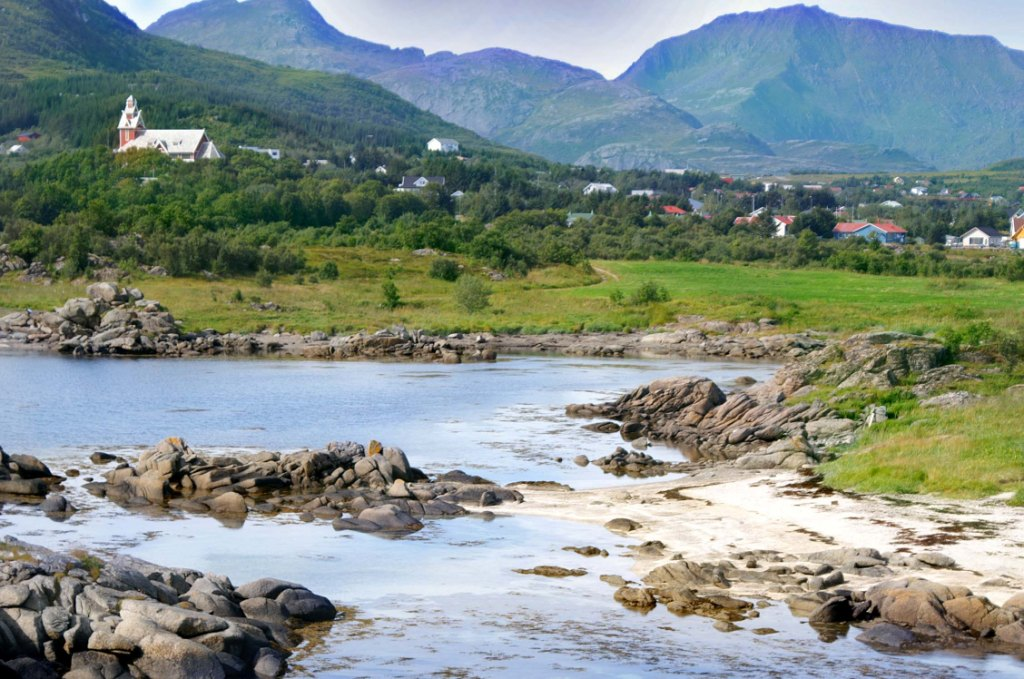
Gravdal, where the local hospital in Lofoten is situated.

Religion in Nordland
| religion | percent |
| Christianity | 89.92% |
| Islam | 0.43% |
| Buddhism | 0.06% |
| Other | 9.59% |

The key industries are fisheries and offshore petroleum exploration. Nordland is well known for the fishing of codfish and fish farming of salmon. Main export markets are Germany, Scandinavia, Britain, Netherlands, Italy, Spain, France, Russia and Japan.

Tourism is important, mainly in the summer season, although there are some winter visitors looking for good skiing or wanting to see the Northern Lights, especially from February to April. Tourists are attracted by the scenic coast, especially Lofoten, which is also visited by many cruise ships in the summer, while the rest of the county often is ignored by tourists. Mountain hiking is popular among natives and some tourists.

Whale watching attracts tourists to Andøy Municipality and the Hamarøy Municipality/Lødingen Municipality /Vågan Municipality area. Fishing is also popular along the coast and in the salmon and trout rivers; there is also Arctic char in some rivers. Saltstraumen has the world record for coalfish using a fishing rod, and Røst has the world record for halibut, 202 kilograms (445 lb) ().

Farming is another regional economy and consists mainly of dairy farming and livestock such as sheep, and domesticated reindeer graze the inland highlands. There is also some forestry, particularly in the Helgeland district, but also further north. In earlier days, grain was grown in Nordland (mostly barley, some oats). Nordlandshest is the smallest of the three Norwegian horse breeds. The Norwegian Lundehund was bred to hunt puffins and was only saved from extinction due to a few remaining dogs in Lofoten.

There is a long history of mining. Sulitjelma has the largest copper deposits in the county, as well as pyrite, the latter is also found in several other locations, but the mining here has been discontinued for economic reasons. In earlier days, silver was mined in the Dunderland Valley in Rana, and until 2002 nickel and olivine was mined in Ballangen. There are several limestone, marble, and dolomite rock quarries, dolomite in Vefsn, Fauske, Sørfold, and Ballangen. As of 2008, mining of gold in Bindal is in testing stages.

The port of Narvik has a direct rail connection to the well-known and profitable Kiruna-Gällivare iron-ore fields in Sweden. There are many dams for hydroelectric power.

Nordland has an increasingly diverse economy, with fledgling research and development in aerospace and space exploration at the Andøya Rocket Range, which primarily is known for its satellite launches. This vast province, Norway's second largest, almost the size of Denmark, traditionally was very important for NATO, and the Royal Norwegian Air Force has two squadrons of F-16 fighters stationed at Bodø Airport and all its P-3 Orion maritime surveillance aircraft stationed at Andøya Air Station. The decommissioning of closing military bases has led to a regional shift towards a new knowledge-based economy.

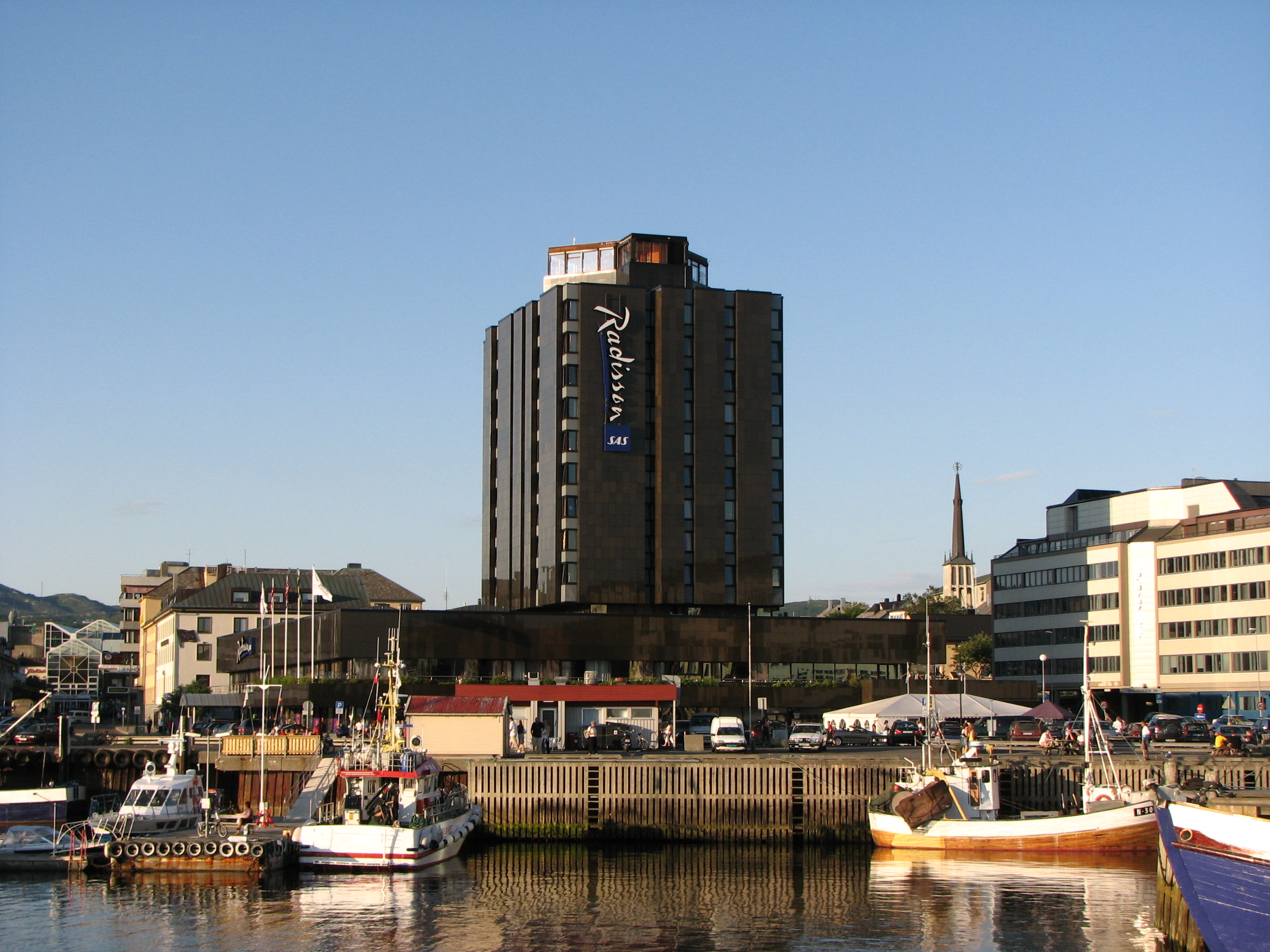
Bodø has an airport, railway station and a harbour within walking distance, and numerous hotels.

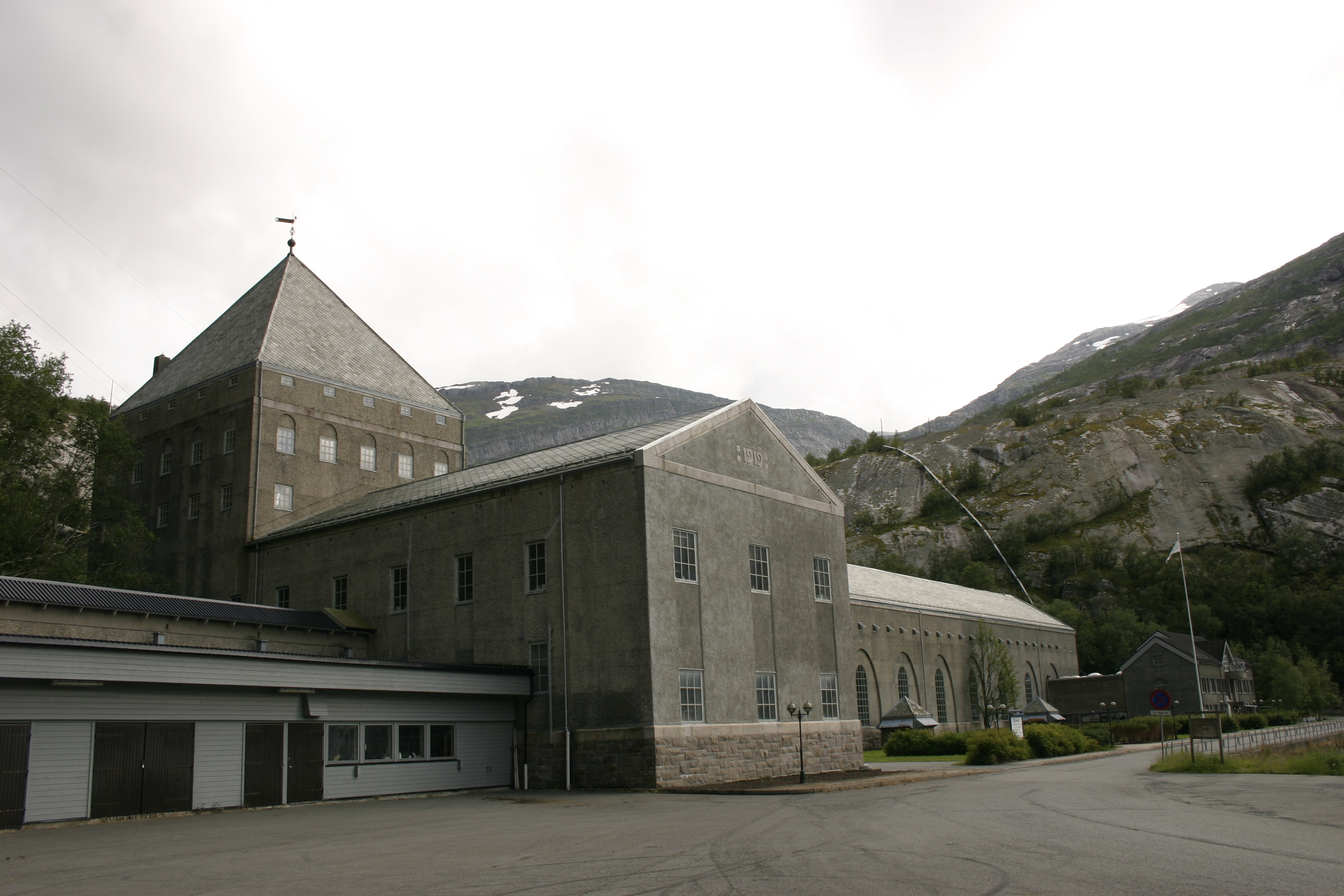
Glomfjord hydroelectric powerplant in Meløy Municipality. Nordland has the largest hydroelectric potential among Norway's counties, and some power-intensive factories.

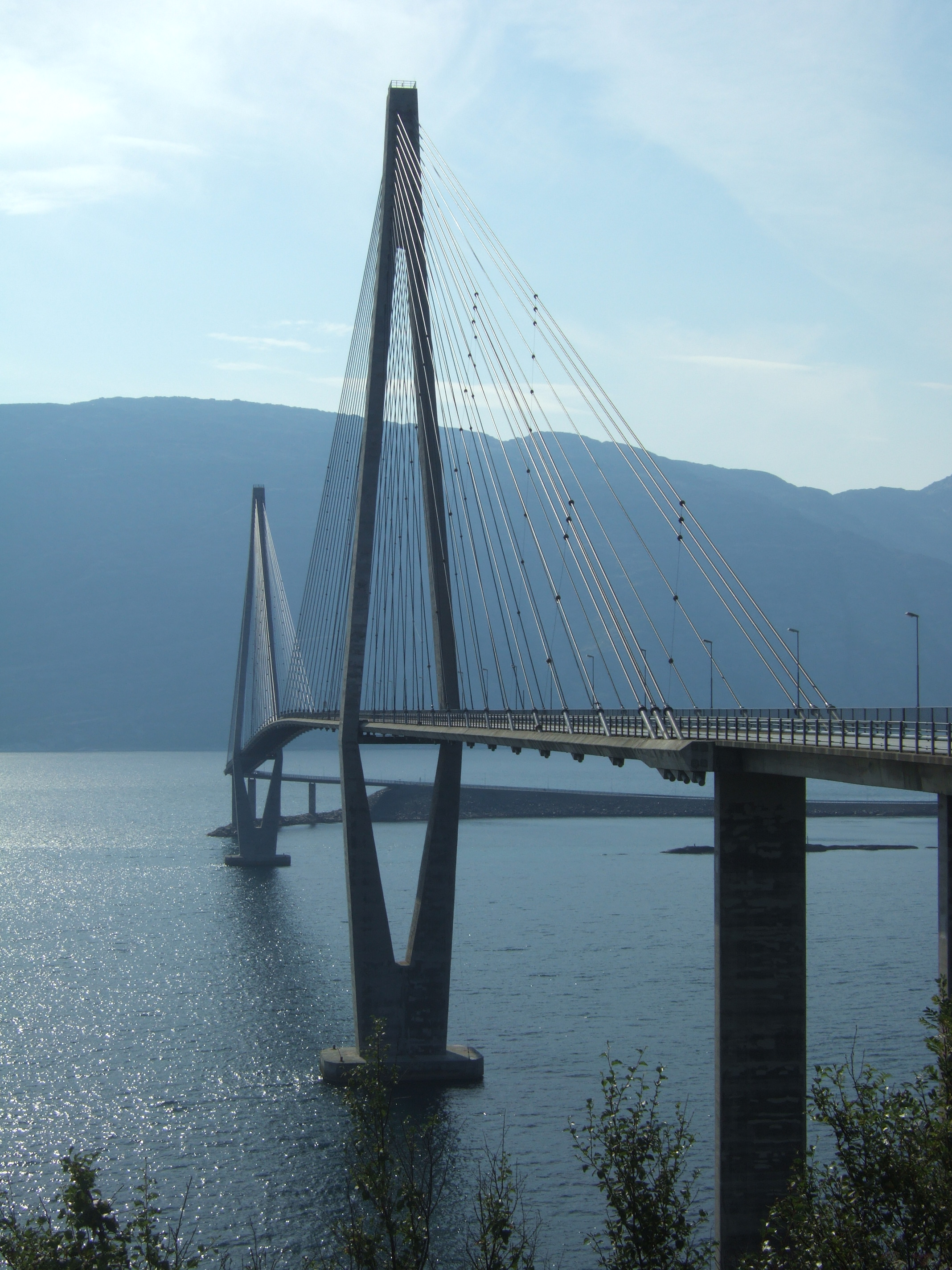
Helgeland Bridge connecting Alsten island to the mainland. With many deep fjords, islands and straits, Nordland is a county of bridges.

Bodø Airport is the busiest airport and a hub for many smaller airports in Nordland. Harstad/Narvik Airport, Evenes in the north also has non-stop flights to Oslo. The European route E6 runs along the entire length of Nordland. There are many tunnels and bridges; some of the largest are Helgeland Bridge, Gimsøystraumen Bridge, Raftsund Bridge, Skjomen Bridge, Rombak Bridge, Hadsel Bridge, Sortland Bridge, Andøy Bridge, Saltstraumen Bridge, Kjellingstraumen Bridge and Brønnøysund Bridge. Even with improved communications, population numbers in Nordland have actually decreased slightly since 1990, as many young people move to larger cities in Norway. Bodø Municipality is the only municipality in the county with significant growth in population.

There are local hospitals in Mosjøen, Sandnessjøen, Mo i Rana, Bodø (the largest), Gravdal, Narvik and Stokmarknes.

== History ==
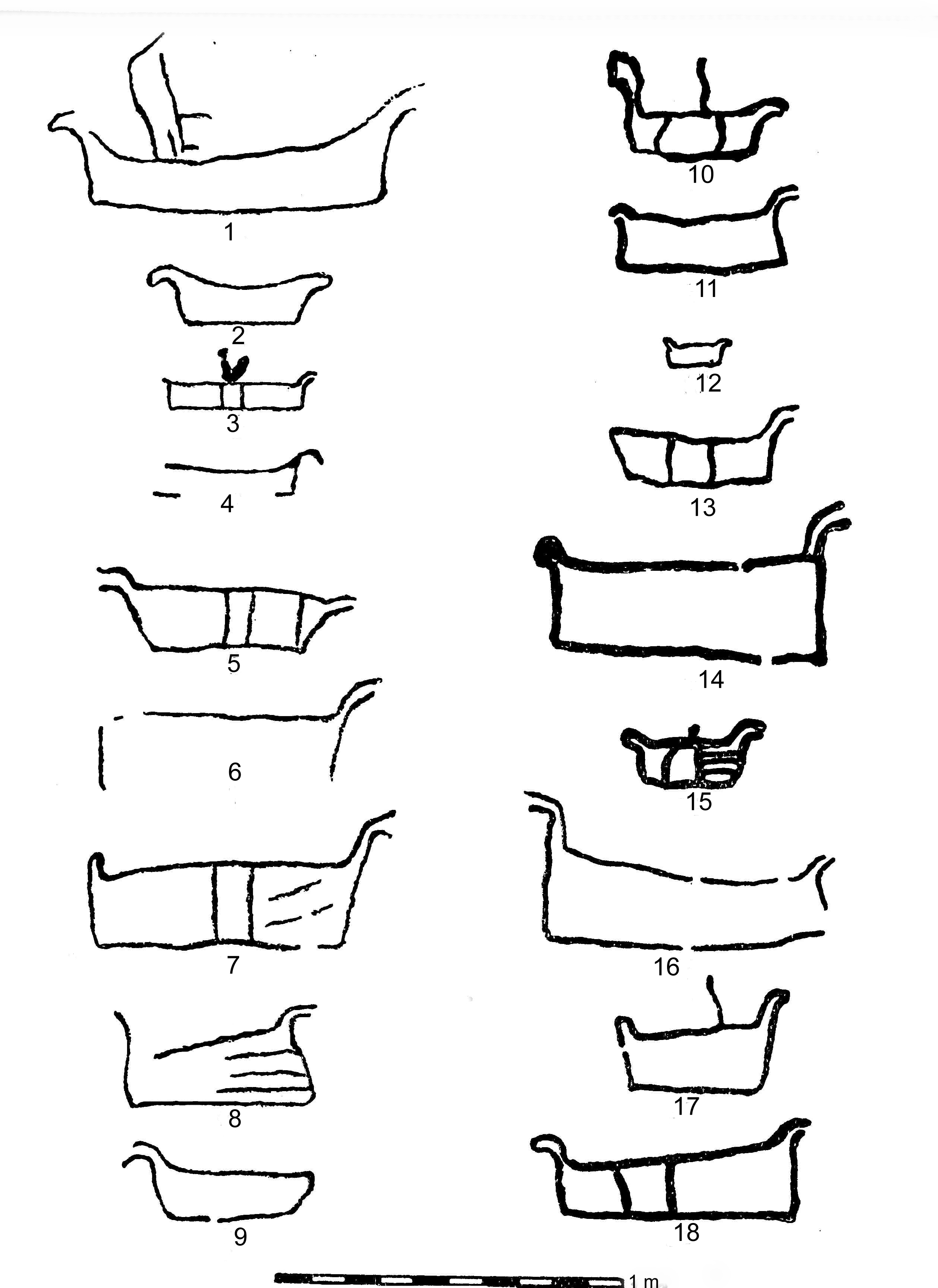
Prehistoric rock drawings showing boats, 1-2 from Skjomen, 3-4 from Rødøy Municipality, the other from Frosta Municipality.

There is evidence of human settlement in Nordland as far back as 10,500 years ago, about as early as in southern Norway. These Stone Age people lived near the coast, often on islands and typically along straits near the open sea, with a rich provision of marine resources. Such archeological evidence has been found on Vega, in the Leirfjorden, and along the Saltstraumen. There are at least 15 locations with prehistoric rock carvings in Nordland, from Helgeland in the south to Narvik in the north (see Fosna-Hensbacka culture).

Some of the oldest houses known in Norway were excavated on Langhågan on the island Sanna in Træna Municipality; the oldest house was oval, 6 metres (20 ft) by 4.5 metres (15 ft), and is dated to 4000 BC. A 65 metres (213 ft) long stone paved "trail" from the house down to a small harbour, today 23 metres (75 ft) above sea level, is still visible.

The 4,600-year-old rock drawings at Rødøy Municipality, which depict a man on skis holding a stick, is the oldest known reference of skis being used. The location is somewhat surprising, as this island has unreliable snow cover, and the Scandinavian climate was warmer in the Stone Age. This rock drawing was used as a pictogram in the Lillehammer Olympic Games in 1994.

The first agricultural culture has been dated to the Bronze Age. This culture left large burial cairns close to the sea, for instance in Steigen Municipality and Vestvågøy Municipality, and the northernmost location is around Harstad Municipality in southern Troms. These locations have significant areas of lowland suited for agriculture, they are close to the sea and they have many natural harbours.

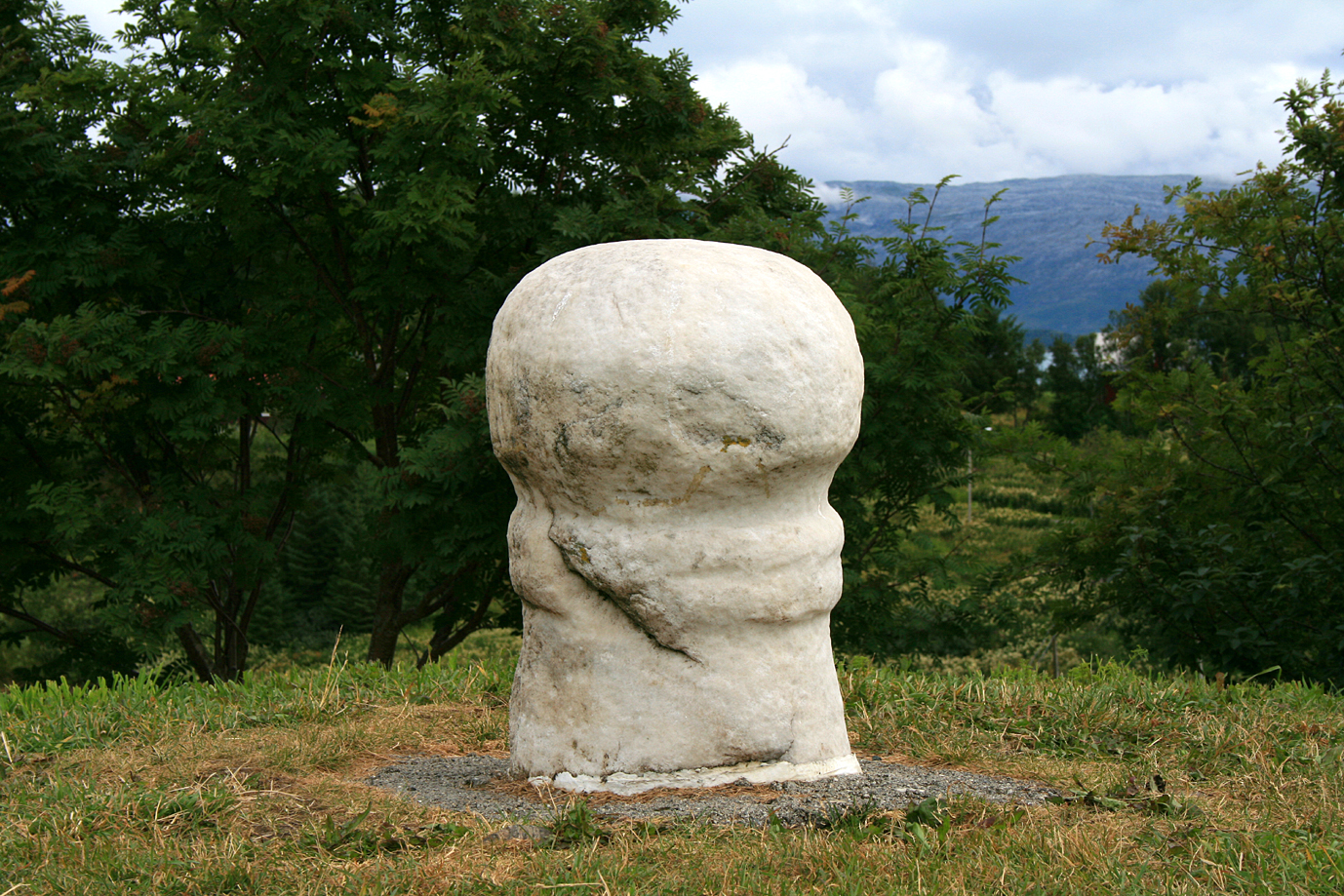
Marble phallus on the island of Dønna, estimated to have been built between the 4th and 6th centuries

The oldest remains of a boat ever found in Norway were discovered in a bog in Sømna Municipality. Known as Haugvikbåten, the well-preserved piece, kept in the Museum of Science (Vitenskapsmuseet) in Trondheim, has been dated to 800–400 BC—the Nordic Bronze Age ().

For many generations, Hålogaland had been the northernmost area of Norse settlement. The remnants of large longhouses near Borg (Vestvågøy) and in Steigen are dated to the Merovinger period (ca 600 AD). There is substantial archeological evidence of a Norse iron-based culture along the coast from approximately 200 AD.

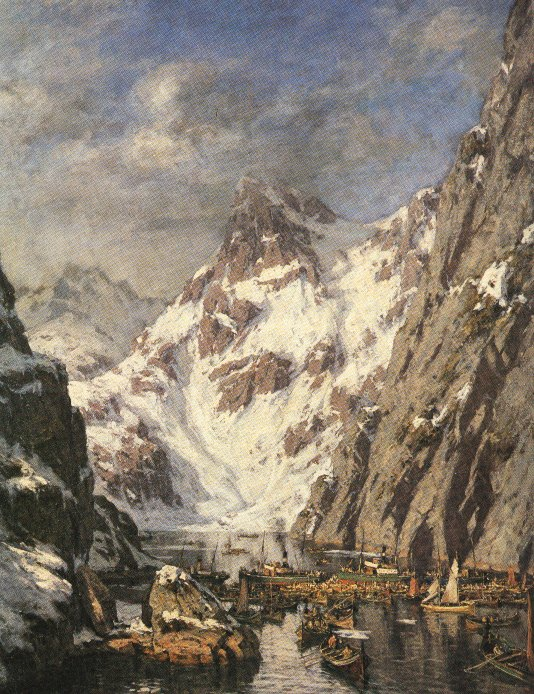
Trollfjordslaget - The battle of Trollfjord by Gunnar Berg

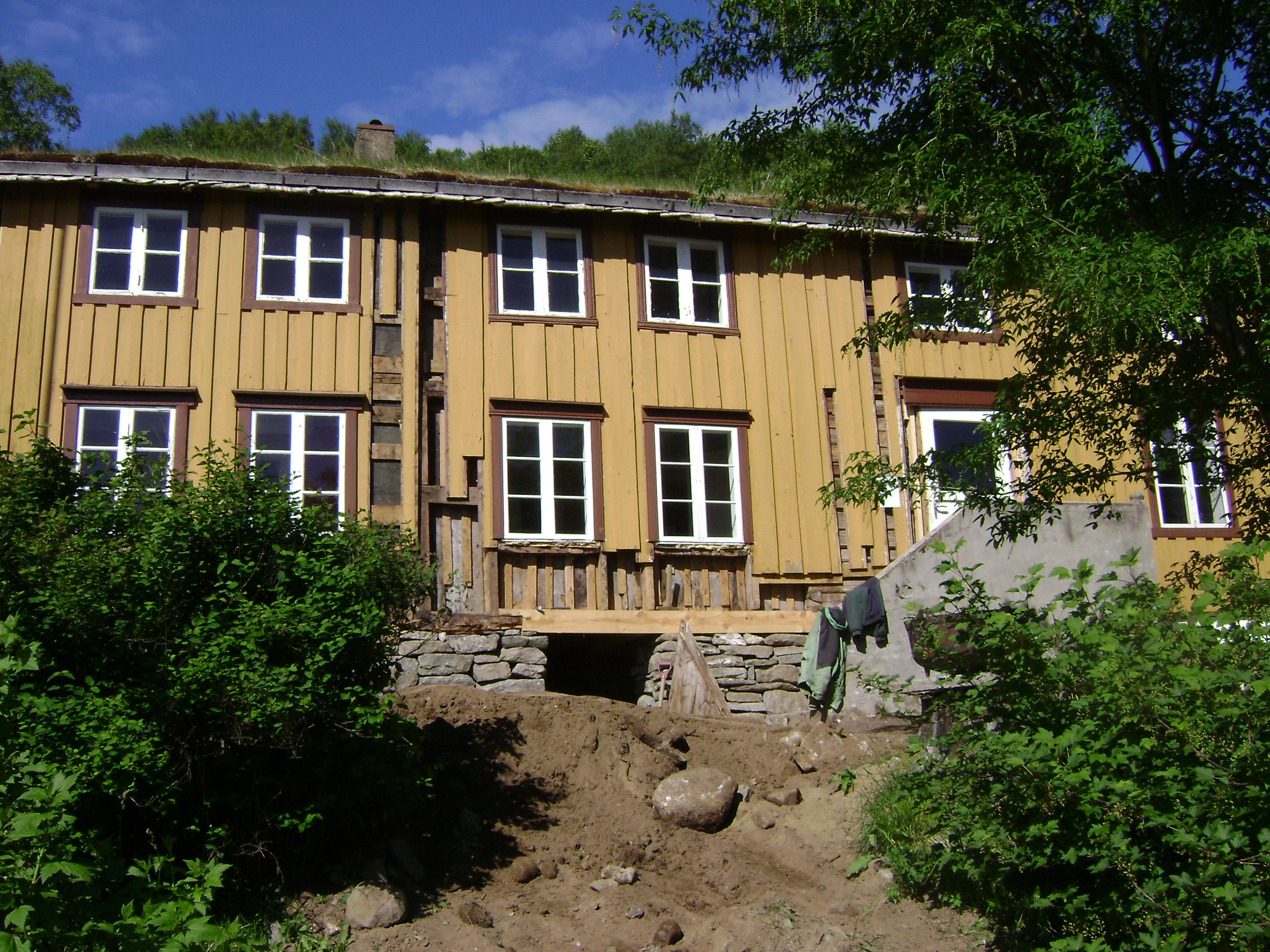
Hamsun Farm, Hamarøy Municipality, part of the Norwegian Cultural Heritage.

Nordland is regarded as part of Sápmi. The Sami (or Sámi), which are not of Norse origins, have lived in Nordland for at least 2,000 years. Not just inland, but also along the fjords and, in the northern part of Nordland, even on the coast and larger islands, such as Hinnøya. There is a story in Heimskringla about a Viking who became a contender for the throne, Sigurd Slembe. He was on the run from the king and was helped by Sami in what is probably Lødingen Municipality today. The Sami even built him a boat, which the saga mention was made from pine wood (viking ships were typically made from oak wood, but the oak does not grow naturally this far north). Tysfjord today is a centre for the Lule Sami culture.

The current county of Nordland was part of the petty kingdom of Hålogaland in the Viking era. This kingdom also included the southern part of Troms.

In January 1432, an Italian trade ship going from Crete to Flanders was hit by a storm and taken far north where it was wrecked; some of the crew survived and came ashore on a small island in Røst Municipality. They were taken care of by the people of Røst. The story, told by one of the men, Pietro Querini, gives one of the very few descriptions of life in Nordland in this time period (Querini - Norw txt). Querini sees the people of Røst (in all 120 people) as very trusting and good Catholics, the inner circle of paradise. He also mentions a German priest, which they could talk to in Latin. People lived from fishing cod and halibut, which they traded for other goods (like grain) in Bergen—the cod as stockfish. Each family also had about 5 cows and collected eggs from semi-domesticated ducks. The shipwrecked men did not lack food during their winter stay, usually fish, but Querini also mentions milk, meat, butter, and pancakes. The people of Røst lived in round, wooden houses, and mostly used clothes made of wool. By late May, sailing in 24-hour daylight, the Italians were taken south to Bergen.

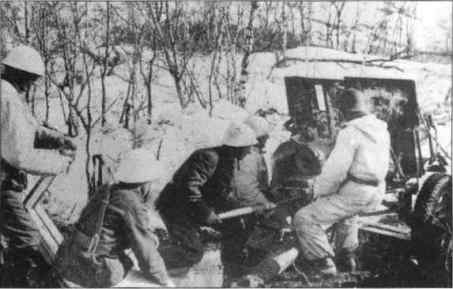
The Battle of Narvik saw the hardest fighting in Norway in World War II; about 7,500 Norwegian soldiers took part in the battle, along with British, French and Polish troops. The recapture of Narvik was the first time the Nazi German war machine had to withdraw from a captured town.

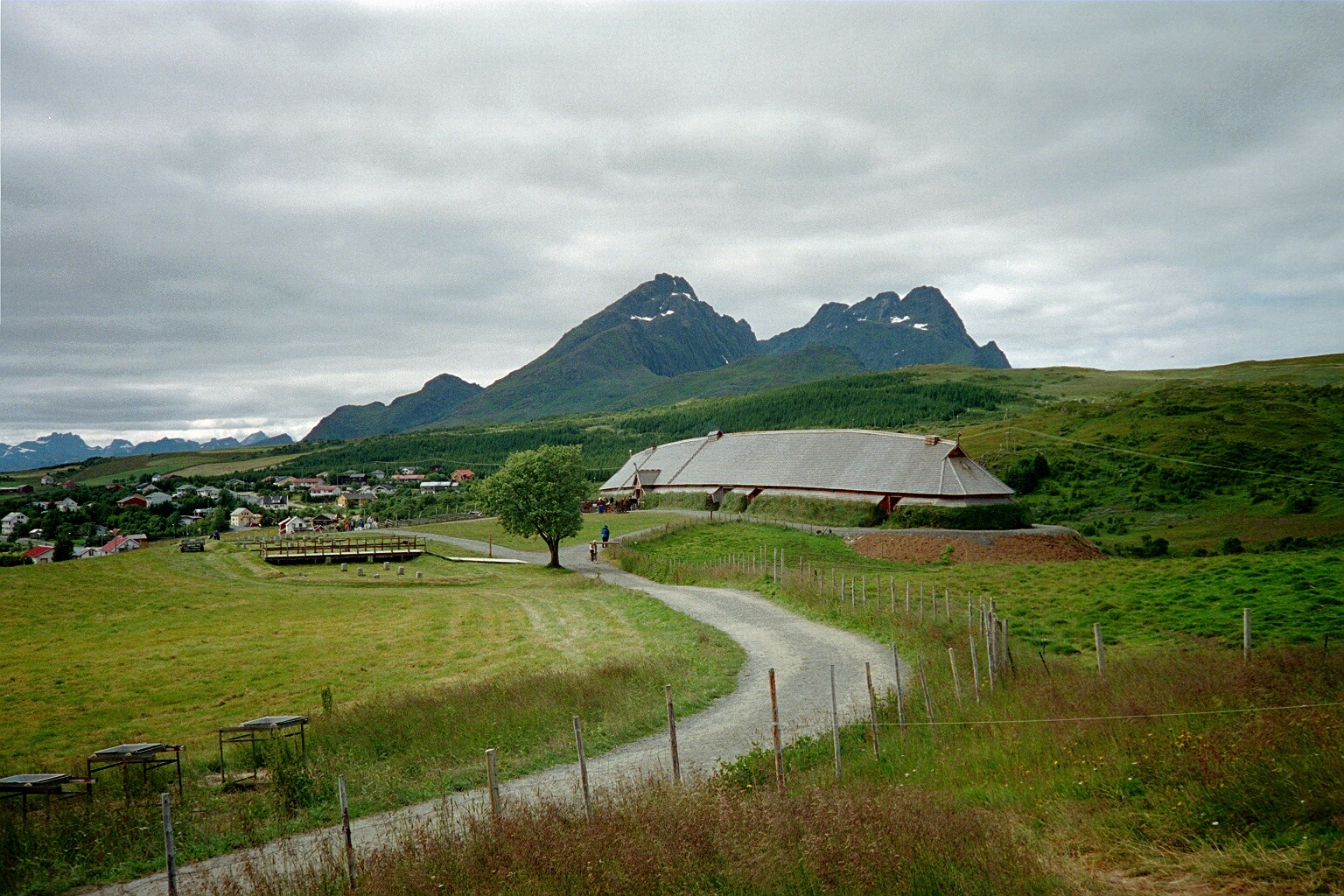
The reconstructed chieftain house, Lofotr Viking Museum, Borg in Vestvågøy Municipality.

The largest ship disaster ever in Norway took place in 1944 when Rigel transporting German prisoners was bombed by British Fleet Air Arm aircraft near Sandnessjøen (Alstahaug Municipality), with more than 2,500 casualties. The ship was grounded on Rosøya, where it remained, half sunk until it was demolished in 1970.

Petter Dass lived in Alstahaug Municipality, and the Nobel laureate author Knut Hamsun grew up in Hamarøy Municipality after his family moved there when he was 3 years old.

Nordland County is identical to the Diocese of Sør-Hålogaland.

== Government ==
A county (fylke) is the chief local administrative area in Norway. The whole country is divided into 15 counties (from 2024). A county is also an election area, with popular votes taking place every 4 years. In Nordland, the government of the county is the Nordland County Municipality. It includes 45 members who are elected to form a county council (Fylkesting). Heading the Fylkesting is the county mayor (fylkesordførar). Since October 2023, the Nordland County Municipality has been led by Eivind Holst, the county mayor. The County Municipality elects a County Cabinet, which is the executive body of Nordland County Council. Since October 2023 Svein Øien Eggesvik is head of the County Cabinet.

The county also has a County Governor (fylkesmann) who is the representative of the King and Government of Norway. Tom Cato Karlsen is the current County Governor of Nordland.

The municipalities in Nordland are divided among several district courts (tingrett): Midtre Hålogaland District Court, Helgeland District Court, and Salten og Lofoten District Court. These courts are subordinate to the Hålogaland Court of Appeal district based in Tromsø.

== Coat of arms ==
The coat of arms was granted on 15 January 1965. The official blazon is "Or, a boat with mast sable" (Norwegian: På gull bunn en svart båt med mast og råseil). This means the arms have a field (background) has a tincture of Or which means it is commonly colored yellow, but if it is made out of metal, then gold is used. The charge is a black nordlandsbåt (Nordland boat). The boat is the traditional boat of Nordland which was widely used for fishing in the region in old times, now they are still used for recreation. The black colour symbolizes the tar that was used on the boats. The golden background refers to the sun. The municipal flag has the same design as the coat of arms.

== Twin region ==
- Lower Silesia, Poland
- Zhejiang, China
- Veneto, Italy

== Municipalities ==
Nordland County has a total of 41 municipalities:

| Municipal Number | Name | Adm. Centre | Location in the county | Established | Includes (former municipalities) |
|---|---|---|---|---|---|
| 1804 | Bodø Municipality | Bodø | | 1 Jan 1838 | 1842 Skjerstad Municipality; 1843 Bodin Municipality; 1844 Kjerringøy Municipality; 1846 Nordfold-Kjerringøy Municipality (part) |
| 1806 | Narvik Municipality | Narvik | | 1 Jan 2020 | 1805 Narvik (town); 1850 Tysfjord Municipality (part); 1853 Ofoten Municipality; 1854 Ballangen Municipality; 1855 Ankenes Municipality |
| 1811 | Bindal Municipality | Terråk | | 1 Jan 1838 | |
| 1812 | Sømna Municipality | Vik | | 1 Jan 1977 | |
| 1813 | Brønnøy Municipality | Brønnøysund | | 1 Jan 1977 | 1801 Brønnøysund (town); 1813 Velfjord Municipality; 1814 Brønnøy Municipality |
| 1815 | Vega Municipality | Gladstad | | 1 Jan 1838 | 1817 Tjøtta Municipality (part) |
| 1816 | Vevelstad Municipality | Forvika | | 1 Jan 1916 | |
| 1818 | Herøy Municipality | Silvalen | | 1 Jan 1864 | |
| 1820 | Alstahaug Municipality | Sandnessjøen | | 1 Jan 1838 | 1821 Stamnes Municipality (part); 1817 Tjøtta Municipality (part) |
| 1822 | Leirfjord Municipality | Leland | | 1 July 1915 | 1821 Stamnes Municipality (part); 1817 Tjøtta Municipality (part) |
| 1824 | Vefsn Municipality | Mosjøen | | 1 Jan 1838 | 1802 Mosjøen (town); 1823 Drevja Municipality; 1829 Elsfjord Municipality |
| 1825 | Grane Municipality | Trofors | | 1 July 1927 | |
| 1826 | Hattfjelldal Municipality | Hattfjelldal | | 1 Jan 1862 | |
| 1827 | Dønna Municipality | Solfjellsjøen | | 1 Jan 1962 | 1819 Nordvik Municipality; 1827 Dønnes Municipality |
| 1828 | Nesna Municipality | Nesna | | 1 Jan 1838 | |
| 1832 | Hemnes Municipality | Korgen | | 1 Jan 1838 | 1830 Korgen Municipality; 1831 Sør-Rana Municipality (part) |
| 1833 | Rana Municipality | Mo i Rana | | 1 Jan 1964 | 1803 Mo (town); 1828 Nesna Municipality (part); 1831 Sør-Rana Municipality (part); 1833 Nord-Rana Municipality |
| 1834 | Lurøy Municipality | Lurøy | | 1 Jan 1838 | |
| 1835 | Træna Municipality | Husøya | | 1 Jan 1872 | |
| 1836 | Rødøy Municipality | Vågaholmen | | 1 Jan 1838 | |
| 1837 | Meløy Municipality | Ørnes | | 1 Jan 1884 | |
| 1838 | Gildeskål Municipality | Inndyr | | 1 Jan 1838 | |
| 1839 | Beiarn Municipality | Moldjord | | 1 Jan 1853 | |
| 1840 | Saltdal Municipality | Rognan | | 1 Jan 1838 | |
| 1841 | Fauske Municipality | Fauske | | 1 Jan 1905 | |
| 1845 | Sørfold Municipality | Straumen | | 1 Jan 1887 | 1845 Folden Municipality; 1846 Nordfold Municipality (part); 1846 Nordfold-Kjerringøy Municipality (part) |
| 1848 | Steigen Municipality | Leinesfjord | | 1 Jan 1838 | 1846 Nordfold Municipality (part); 1846 Nordfold-Kjerringøy Municipality (part); 1847 Leiranger Municipality |
| 1851 | Lødingen Municipality | Lødingen | | 1 Jan 1838 | |
| 1853 | Evenes Municipality | Bogen | | 1 Jan 1884 | 1853 Ofoten Municipality |
| 1856 | Røst Municipality | Røstlandet | | 1 Jan 1928 | |
| 1857 | Værøy Municipality | Sørland | | 1 Jan 1838 | |
| 1859 | Flakstad Municipality | Ramberg | | 1 Jan 1976 | 1858 Moskenes Municipality |
| 1860 | Vestvågøy Municipality | Leknes | | 1 Jan 1963 | 1860 Buksnes Municipality; 1861 Hol Municipality; 1862 Borge Municipality; 1863 Valberg Municipality |
| 1865 | Vågan Municipality | Svolvær | | 1 Jan 1838 | 1806 Svolvær (town); 1864 Gimsøy Municipality |
| 1866 | Hadsel Municipality | Stokmarknes | | 1 Jan 1838 | |
| 1867 | Bø Municipality | Straume | | 1 Jan 1838 | |
| 1868 | Øksnes Municipality | Myre | | 1 Jan 1838 | 1869 Langenes Municipality |
| 1870 | Sortland Municipality | Sortland | | 1 Jan 1841 | |
| 1871 | Andøy Municipality | Andenes | | 1 Jan 1964 | 1871 Bjørnskinn Municipality; 1872 Dverberg Municipality; 1873 Andenes Municipality |
| 1874 | Moskenes Municipality | Reine | | 1 Jan 1976 | 1858 Moskenes Municipality |
| 1875 | Hamarøy Municipality | Oppeid | | 1 Jan 2020 | 1849 Hamarøy Municipality; 1850 Tysfjord Municipality (part) |

== See also ==
- Hålogalandsallmenningen
