= Leiranger Municipality =

Former municipality in Nordland, Norway

Leiranger Municipality Leiranger herred
- Former municipality
- Ledingen herred (historic name)
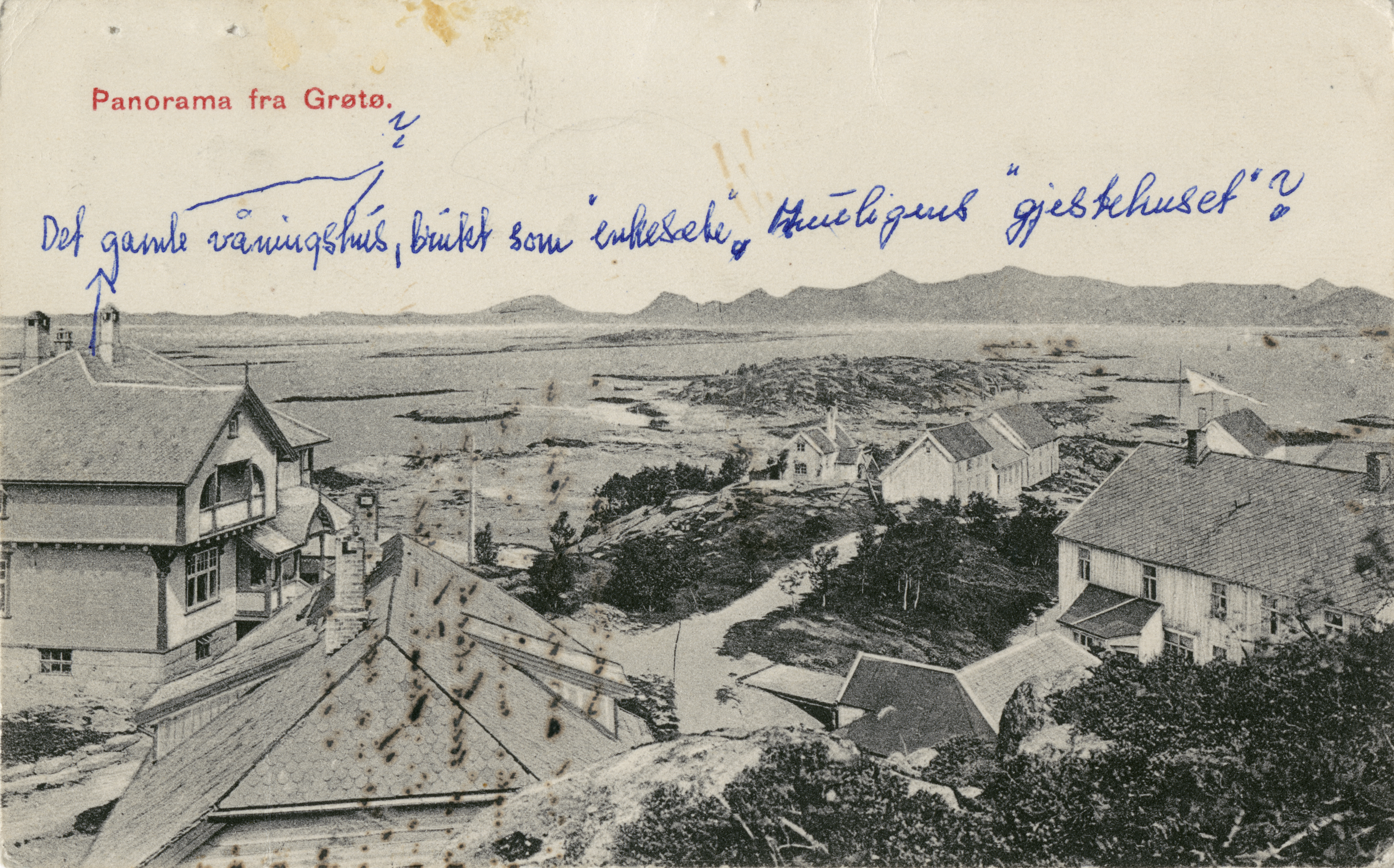
- View of Grøtøy (c. 1910)

- Nordland within Norway

- Leiranger within Nordland
- Coordinates: 67°44′17″N 14°48′22″E
- Country: Norway
- County: Nordland
- District: Salten
- Established: 1 Sept 1900
  - Preceded by: Steigen Municipality
- Disestablished: 1 Jan 1964
  - Succeeded by: Steigen Municipality
- Administrative centre: Leines

Government
  - Mayor (1961–1963): Trygve Aasjord (LL)

Area (upon dissolution)
  - Total: 185.2 km^{2} (71.5 sq mi)
  - Rank: #393 in Norway
- Highest elevation: 1,045 m (3,428 ft)

Population (1963)
  - Total: 1,417
  - Rank: #550 in Norway
  - Density: 7.7/km^{2} (20/sq mi)
  - Change (10 years): ▼ −5%
- Demonym: Leirangerværing

Official language
  - Norwegian form: Bokmål
- Time zone: UTC+01:00 (CET)
  - Summer (DST): UTC+02:00 (CEST)
- ISO 3166 code: NO-1847

Leiranger is a former municipality in Nordland county, Norway. The 185-square-kilometre (71 sq mi) municipality existed from 1900 until its dissolution in 1964. The municipality was encompassed the around the Leinesfjorden and the islands surrounding the mouth of the fjord in what is now Steigen Municipality. The administrative centre of Leiranger was the village of Leines. The village of Leinesfjorden lies at the end of the fjord.

Prior to its dissolution in 1963, the 185.2-square-kilometre (71.5 sq mi) municipality was the 393rd largest by area out of the 689 municipalities in Norway. Leiranger Municipality was the 550th most populous municipality in Norway with a population of about 1,417. The municipality's population density was 7.7 inhabitants per square kilometre (20/sq mi) and its population had decreased by 5% over the previous 10-year period.

== General information ==
The municipality was established on 1 September 1900 when the southern district of Steigen Municipality was separated to become the new municipality of Ledingen. Initially, the municipality had 1,117 residents. In 1910, the name was changed to Leiranger. uring the 1960s, there were many municipal mergers across Norway due to the work of the Schei Committee. On 1 January 1964, the following areas were merged to form a new, larger Steigen Municipality:

- all of Leiranger Municipality (population: 1,397)
- all of Steigen Municipality (population: 1,829)
- most of Nordfold Municipality, except for the Mørsvikbotn area (population: 1,212)
- the area south of the Sagfjorden in Hamarøy Municipality (population: 77)
- the Brennsund area of Kjerringøy Municipality (population: 30)

=== Name ===
The municipality was originally named Ledingen after the old name for the local fjord that is now called Leinesfjorden (Old Norse: Leiðangrar). The first element is leir which means "clay". The last element is angr which means "fjord". Thus the name means the "clay fjord". On 3 July 1909, a royal resolution changed the spelling of the name of the municipality to Leiranger, to give it a modern version of the Old Norse name.

=== Churches ===
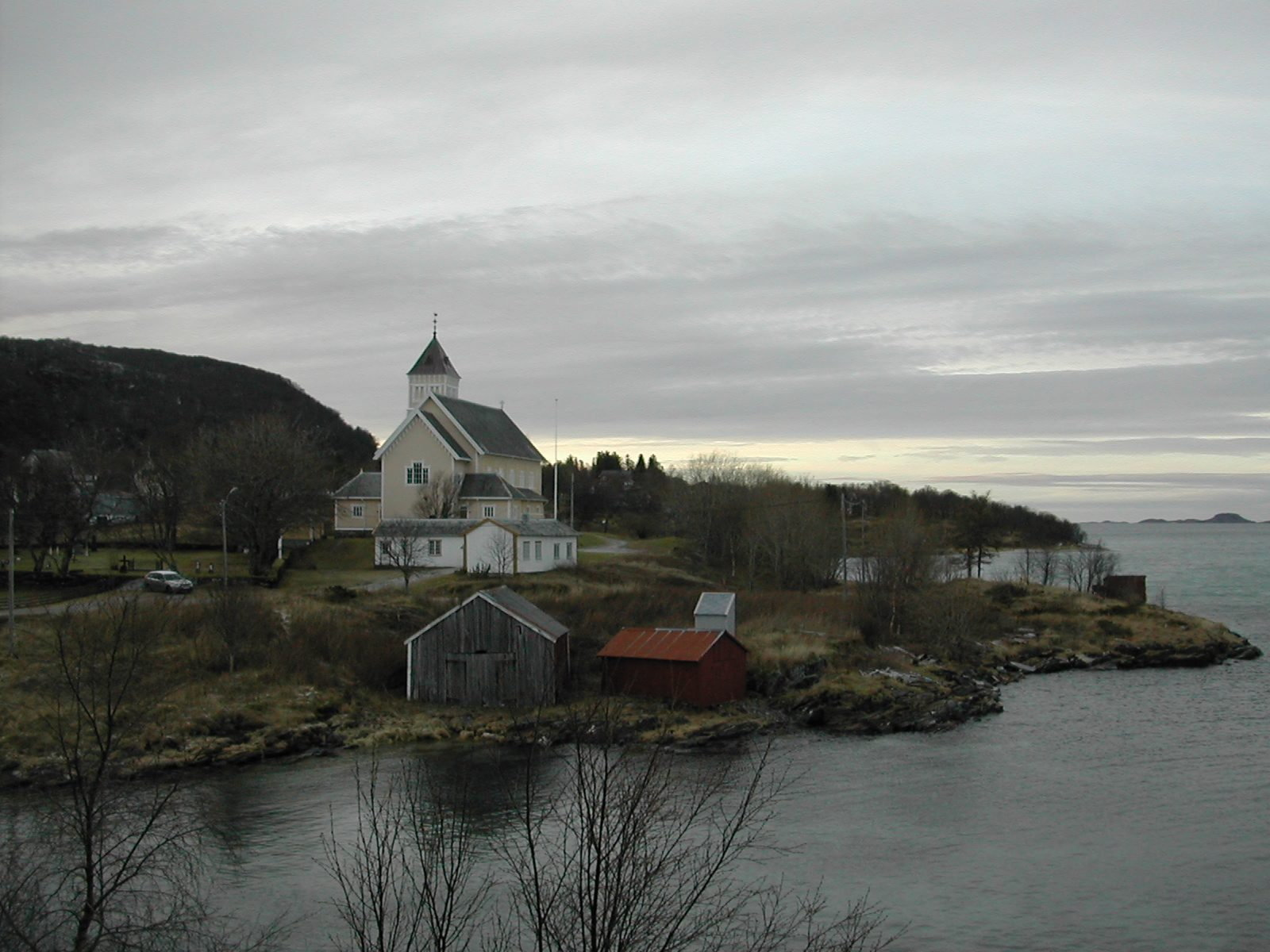
View of the Leiranger Church

The Church of Norway had one parish (sokn) within Leiranger Municipality. At the time of the municipal dissolution, it was part of the Steigen prestegjeld and the Nordre Salten prosti (deanery) in the Diocese of Sør-Hålogaland.

Churches in Leiranger Municipality
| Parish (sokn) | Church name | Location of the church | Year built |
|---|---|---|---|
| Leiranger | Leiranger Church | Leines | 1911 |
| Leiranger | Leinesfjord Chapel | Leinesfjorden | 1912 |
| Leiranger | Sørskot Chapel | Sørskot | 1953 |

== Geography ==
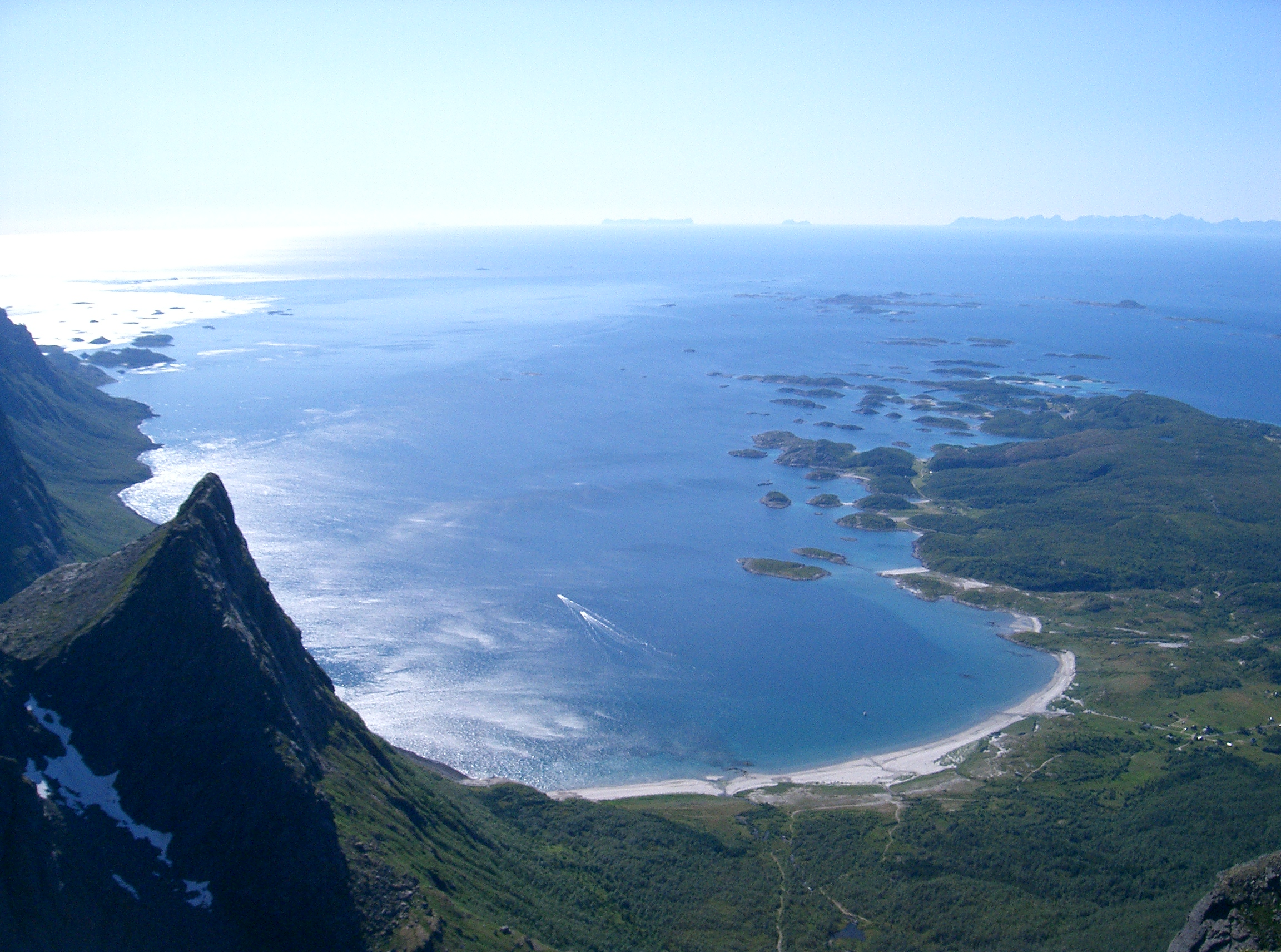
View of the Brennviksanden beach in southern Leiranger Municipality

The municipality included all the area around the Leinesfjorden. To the north was Steigen Municipality, to the east was Nordfold Municipality, and to the south was Kjerringøy Municipality. The highest point in the municipality was the 1,045-metre (3,428 ft) tall mountain Kråktindan.

== Government ==
While it existed, Leiranger Municipality was responsible for primary education (through 10th grade), outpatient health services, senior citizen services, welfare and other social services, zoning, economic development, and municipal roads and utilities. The municipality was governed by a municipal council of directly elected representatives. The mayor was indirectly elected by a vote of the municipal council. Hålogaland Court of Appeal.

=== Municipal council ===
The municipal council (Herredsstyre) of Leiranger Municipality was made up of representatives that were elected to four year terms. The tables below show the historical composition of the council by political party.

Leiranger herredsstyre 1959–1963
| Party name (in Norwegian) | Number of representatives |
|---|---|
| Labour Party (Arbeiderpartiet) | 9 |
| Joint List(s) of Non-Socialist Parties (Borgerlige Felleslister) | 5 |
| Local List(s) (Lokale lister) | 3 |
| Total number of members: | 17 |
Note: On 1 January 1964, Leiranger Municipality became part of Steigen Municipality.

Leiranger herredsstyre 1955–1959
| Party name (in Norwegian) | Number of representatives |
|---|---|
| Labour Party (Arbeiderpartiet) | 9 |
| Joint List(s) of Non-Socialist Parties (Borgerlige Felleslister) | 8 |
| Total number of members: | 17 |

Leiranger herredsstyre 1951–1955
| Party name (in Norwegian) | Number of representatives |
|---|---|
| Labour Party (Arbeiderpartiet) | 6 |
| Local List(s) (Lokale lister) | 10 |
| Total number of members: | 16 |

Leiranger herredsstyre 1947–1951
| Party name (in Norwegian) | Number of representatives |
|---|---|
| Labour Party (Arbeiderpartiet) | 8 |
| Local List(s) (Lokale lister) | 8 |
| Total number of members: | 16 |

Leiranger herredsstyre 1945–1947
| Party name (in Norwegian) | Number of representatives |
|---|---|
| Labour Party (Arbeiderpartiet) | 10 |
| Local List(s) (Lokale lister) | 6 |
| Total number of members: | 16 |

Leiranger herredsstyre 1937–1941*
| Party name (in Norwegian) | Number of representatives |
|---|---|
| Labour Party (Arbeiderpartiet) | 6 |
| Joint List(s) of Non-Socialist Parties (Borgerlige Felleslister) | 3 |
| Local List(s) (Lokale lister) | 7 |
| Total number of members: | 16 |
Note: Due to the German occupation of Norway during World War II, no elections were held for new municipal councils until after the war ended in 1945.

=== Mayors ===
The mayor (Norwegian: ordfører) of Leiranger Municipality was the political leader of the municipality and the chairperson of the municipal council. The following people have held this position:

- 1900–1904: Arne Schønning
- 1905–1912: Normann Johan Aasjord
- 1913–1934: Eilert Olsen (V)
- 1935–1937: Ingvald Albriktsen
- 1937–1941: Sverre Aasjord
- 1942–1944: Svein Nordskott (NS)
- 1944–1944: Haakon Myrvold (NS)
- 1945–1946: Sverre Aasjord
- 1946–1959: Hillmar Olsen (Ap)
- 1959–1961: Ole Skjelstad (Ap)
- 1961–1963: Trygve Aasjord (LL)

== See also ==
- List of former municipalities of Norway
