= Forsvatnet (Steigen) =

Lake in Nordland, Norway

- Interactive map of the lake
- Location: Steigen and Hamarøy, Nordland
- Coordinates: 67.9193°N 15.6837°E
- Basin countries: Norway
- Max. length: 4 kilometres (2.5 mi)
- Max. width: 1.3 kilometres (0.81 mi)
- Surface area: 4.83 km^{2} (1.86 sq mi)
- Shore length^{1}: 13.89 kilometres (8.63 mi)
- Surface elevation: 258 metres (846 ft)
- References: NVE
- ^{1} Shore length is not a well-defined measure.

Forsvatnet is a lake that lies on the border of Steigen Municipality and Hamarøy Municipality in Nordland county, Norway. The 4.83-square-kilometre (1.86 sq mi) lake lies just south of the Steigen Tunnel in the northeast part of Steigen Municipality.

== See also ==
- List of lakes in Norway
