= Straumsfjorden =

Straumsfjorden or Straumfjorden may refer to the following places in Norway:

== Straumsfjorden ==
- Straumsfjorden, Agder, a lake in Bygland and Valle municipalities in Agder county
- Straumsfjorden, Troms, a strait in Tromsø and Balsfjord municipalities in Troms county
- Straumsfjorden, Trøndelag, a fjord in Hitra municipality in Trøndelag county
- Straumsfjorden, Vestland, a fjord in Solund municipality in Vestland county

== Straumfjorden ==
- Straumfjorden, Nordland, a fjord in Bø municipality in Nordland county
- Straumfjorden, Sortland, a fjord arm off the Eidsfjorden in Sortland municipality in Nordland county
- Straumfjorden, Steigen, a fjord arm off the Sagfjorden in Steigen municipality in Nordland county
- Straumfjorden, Troms, a fjord arm off the Reisafjorden in Nordreisa municipality in Troms county

== Vinland ==
- Straumfjörð, Straumsfjord or Straumfjord, a fjord in Vinland according to the Saga of Erik the Red

== See also ==
- Straumfjordvatnet, a lake with a similar name
