= Prestegårdsskogen Nature Reserve =

Nature reserve in Norway

Coordinates: 67.9266°N 15.0210°E

- IUCN category Ia (strict nature reserve)
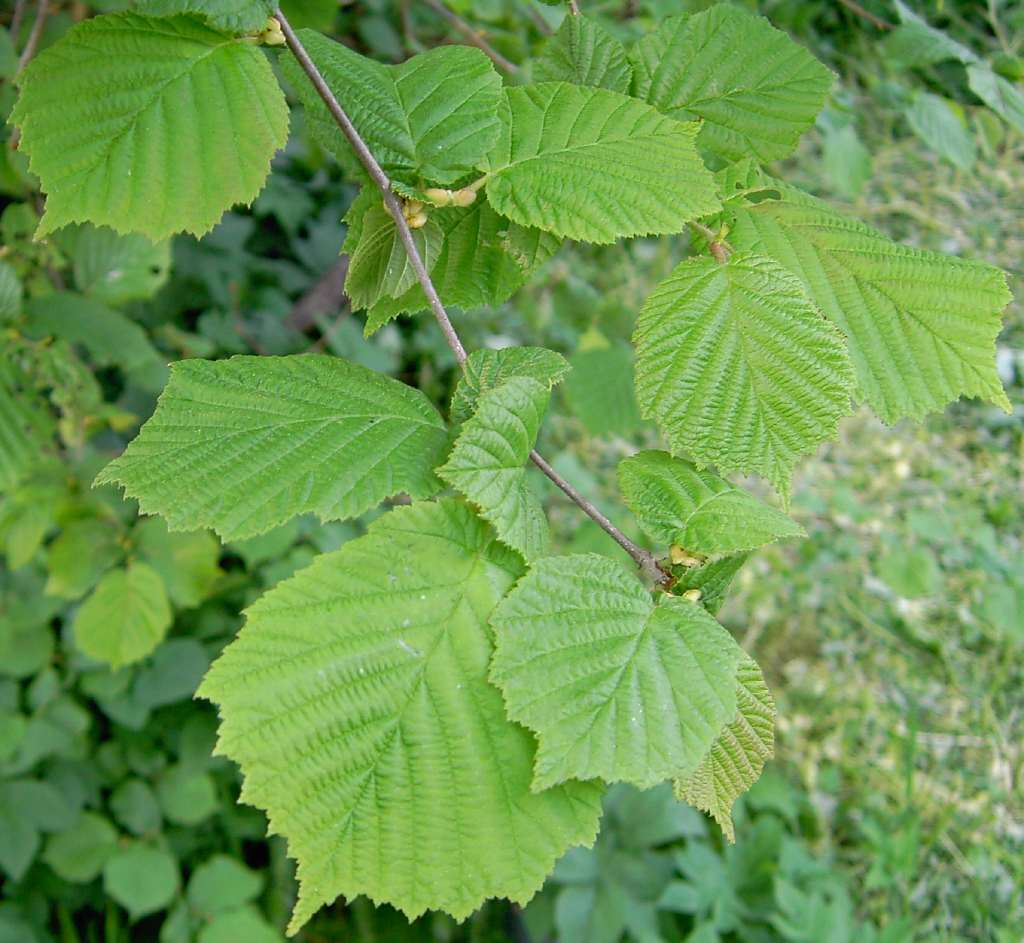
- Hazel tree
- Interactive map of Prestegårdsskogen Nature Reserve
- Location: Steigen Municipality, Norway
- Created: 2000

Prestegårdsskogen Nature Reserve (Norwegian: Prestegårdsskogen naturreservat) is a nature reserve on the southern side of the island of Engeløya in Steigen Municipality in Nordland county, Norway. It is a heavily hazel-forested area; other than a few far smaller exceptions, it is the northernmost known hazel forest. Various other species find their northernmost extent here.

The 276-decare (68-acre; 27.6-hectare) nature reserve was created in 2000, and it has since been expanded to the east to a total of 1,153 decares (285 acres; 115.3 ha). The elevation of the reserve ranges from 20 to 500 metres (66 to 1,640 ft) above sea level.
