= Berit Woie Berg =

Norwegian politician

Berit Helene Woie Berg
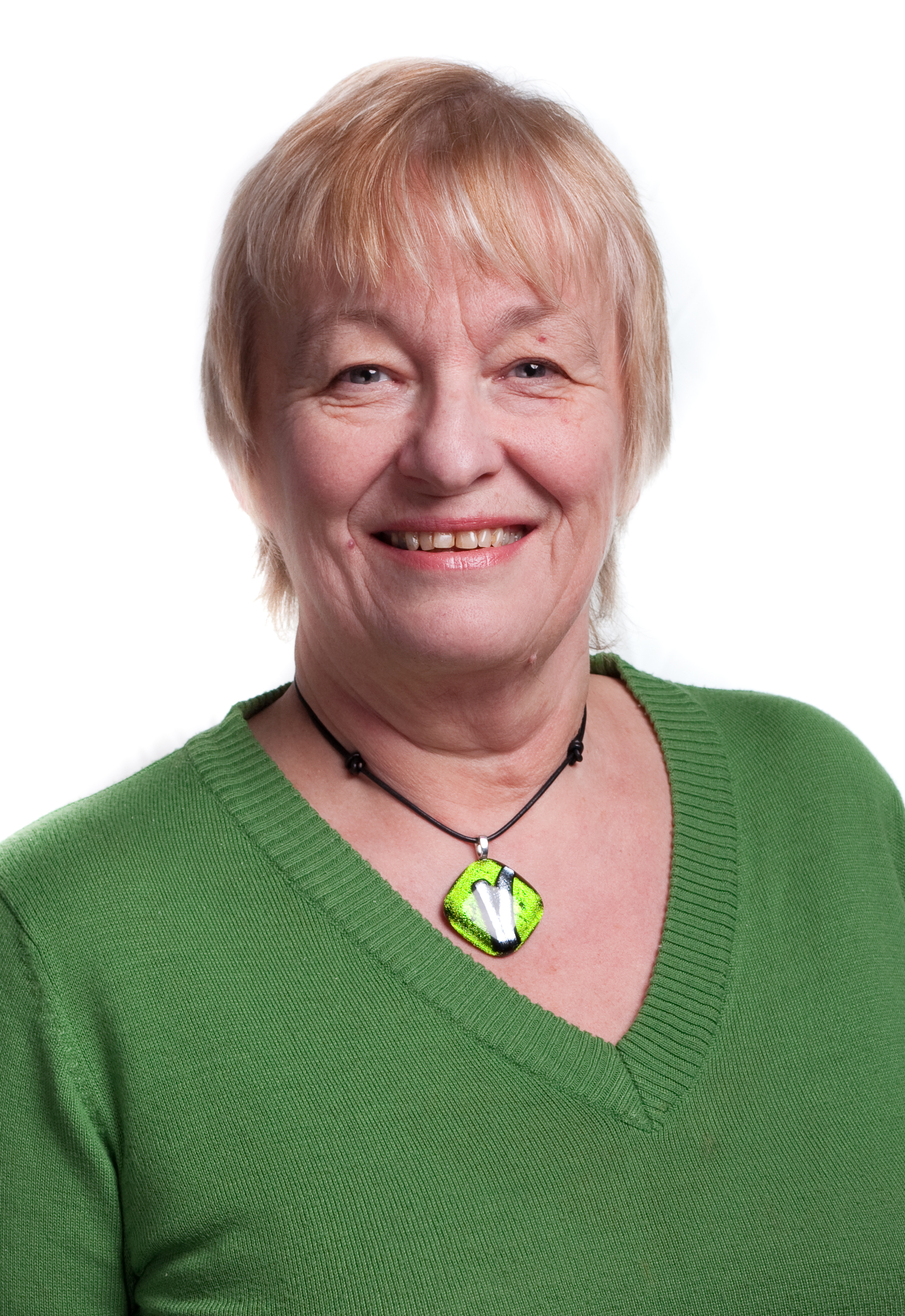
- Berit Woie Berg

Mayor of Steigen Municipality
- In office 2003–2007

Deputy Mayor of Steigen Municipality
- In office 1999–2003

Personal details
- Born: 1951 (age 74–75) Austre Moland Municipality
- Party: Venstre
- Occupation: Politician

Berit Helene Woie Berg (born in 1951 in Austre Moland Municipality) is a Norwegian Venstre party politician from Leines in Steigen Municipality. Woie Berg served as the deputy mayor of Steigen Municipality from 1999 to 2003 and as mayor from 2003 to 2007. She was the leader of Nordland Venstre from 2008 to 2010.

== Early life and career ==
Woie Berg worked as a teacher at Leines School, later at Steigen Central School from 1977 to 1990. From 1990, she was a project manager, and from 1991 to 2003, she served as the managing director of the foundation Kvinneuniversitetet Nord (KUN) which was opened in Steigen in October 1991. In December 1995, she was elected as the leader of Steigen Venstre, and in 1999, she was elected to the municipal council where she held the position of deputy mayor in the subsequent period. In 2003, Woie Berg was elected as Steigen's first female mayor.

In December 2007, Woie Berg was employed as a senior adviser at KUN, and from 2009 to 2021, she worked as the Nav leader in Steigen.
