= 40.6 cm SK C/34 gun =

German coastal defence artillery

Coordinates: 68.8339°N 16.5831°E

40.6 cm SK C/34
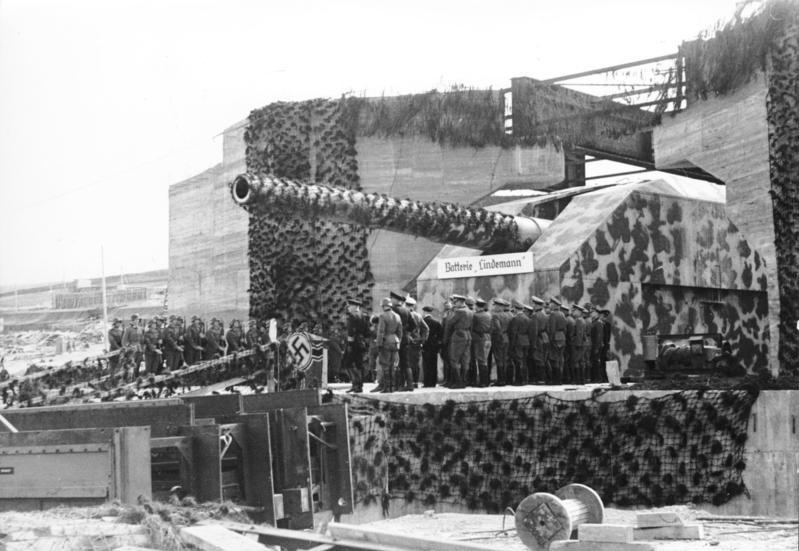
- Batterie "Lindemann" 1942
- Type: (Intended) Naval gun, (Actual) Coastal defence gun

Service history
- In service: 1940–1945
- Used by: Nazi Germany
- Wars: World War II

Production history
- Designer: Krupp
- Designed: 1934
- Manufacturer: Krupp

Specifications
- Mass: 1,475 metric tons (1,452 long tons; 1,626 short tons)
- Length: 21.13 m (69 ft 4 in)
- Barrel length: 19.75 m (64 ft 10 in) (52 calibers)
- Shell: L/4.2, L/4.8 and L/4.4
- Shell weight: 1,030 kg (2,270 lb) (L/4.8 and L/4.4); 600 kg (1,300 lb) (L/4.2)
- Caliber: 406 mm (16.0 in)
- Elevation: 52 degrees
- Rate of fire: 2 rounds per minute
- Muzzle velocity: 1,000 m/s (3,300 ft/s) (long range shell); 810 m/s (2,700 ft/s) (standard shell)
- Effective firing range: 56 km (35 mi) (long range shell); 42 km (26 mi) (standard shell)

The 40.6 cm SK C/34, (Note: SK - Schnelladekanone (quick loading cannon); C - Construktionsjahr (year of design)) sometimes known as the Adolfkanone (lit. 'Adolf gun'), was a German naval gun, designed in 1934 by Krupp and originally intended for the early H-class battleships.

== Description ==
Intended to be mounted in battleship turrets, the guns were produced in left and right-handed pairs. These pairs were split for individual mounting in the coastal defence role. The gun's barrel was approximately 20 metres (66 ft) long. In a coastal defence emplacement the gun could be elevated to 52 degrees, giving it a range of 56 kilometres (35 mi) with the special 600 kilograms (1,300 lb) long range shell called the Adolf-shell. It used the standard German naval system of ammunition where the base charge was held in a metallic cartridge case and supplemented by another charge in a silk bag. In terms of construction the 406 millimetres (16.0 in) guns were identical to the 38 cm SK C/34 - only the calibre of the barrel was different. The rate of fire for the weapon was around 2 rounds per minute as coastal artillery.

== Original naval specifications ==
- Date of design - 1934
- Entered service - 1940 (as coastal defense guns)
- Bore - 406 mm (16.0 in)
- Length of barrel with rear piece - 21.5 m (71 ft)
- Weight of barrel - 158 metric tons (158,664 kg)
- Rate of fire - 2 rounds per minute
- Shell weight - standard explosive and armour-piercing shell 1,020–1,030 kg (2,250–2,270 lb) German type L/4.8 and L/4.4
- Adolf shell (long range shell) 600 kg (1,300 lb) German type L/4.2
- Propellant weight - 2 part charge total weight 302 kg for ordinary shell and 312 kg for long range shell
- Maximum range - Standard shell 42,800 m (42.8 km); long-range shell 56,000 m (56 km)
- Muzzle Velocity - Standard shell 810 m/s (2,700 ft/s); long-range shell 1,000 m/s (3,300 ft/s)
- Mountings - 2 gun turret Drh LC/34 (1,475 metric tons)

== Coastal defense ==
Since the intended 56,000-ton H-class battleships “H” and “J” were never completed, the guns that had been designed for them were used as coastal defense artillery during the Second World War. At least twelve guns were produced; seven were sited in Norway, and three were used in Poland near Danzig. Soon after their first training shots, the Polish guns were moved to France and sited near Sangatte and renamed Batterie Lindemann in honour of the fallen captain of the battleship Bismarck, Kapitän zur See Ernst Lindemann. One of the remaining guns was used to replace the worn-out gun #2 at Batterie Lindemann, while serial #11 has not been accounted for yet (it may have also been used as replacement at Batterie Lindemann).

=== Gun sites in Poland ===
The first three guns were situated at the Hel Fortified Area, Poland as Battery Schleswig-Holstein (German unit MKB 2 / MAA 119) during 1940 to protect the Bay of Danzig. All three guns were fired during May and June 1941 and shortly after the guns were dismounted and transported to France for use as Battery Lindemann. From this new location near Sangatte in France, they were used to fire at Dover, in the county of Kent in England and shipping in the English Channel. There is a Museum of Coastal Defence located in the remains of the battery in Hel.

=== Gun sites in Norway ===
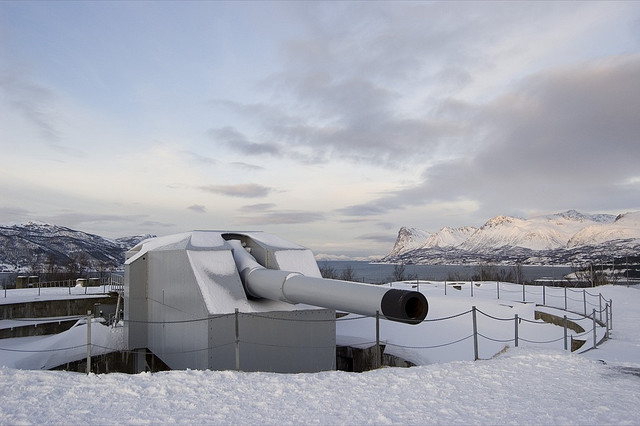
Adolf Gun at Trondenes near Harstad, Norway (2007)

The seven guns that reached their destinations in Norway were split into two batteries:

- Battery Dietl with three guns on the island of Engeløya, Steigen. German unit MKB 4 / MAA 516
- Battery Theo with four guns mounted at Trondenes Fort near Harstad. German unit MKB 5 / MAA 511

After the end of the war the Trondenes guns were taken over by the Norwegian Army, along with 1,227 shells. The battery was last fired in 1957 and formally decommissioned in 1964. The three Engeløya guns were sold for scrap in 1956 but the four guns at Trondenes were spared and one is open as a museum. In the summer there are normally three or four guided tours per day.

=== Gun sites in France ===
The three guns from Hel, re-sited in France and renamed Batterie Lindemann (German unit MKB 6 / MAA 244), saw considerable service. The three guns were emplaced singly in turrets, protected by massive concrete encasements in places four metres thick. The battery fired 2,226 shells at Dover between 1940 and 1944. The guns were not put out of action by bombing despite being hit many times, thanks to the thick concrete. Only Bruno turret was damaged, on 3 September 1944, when a shell from a British railway gun hit its elevating gear; the battery was captured shortly afterwards.

== Naval projectiles ==
- L/4.4 m Bd Z Hb (AP) - 1,030 kg. (25 kg. bursting charge) Armour-piercing shell, rear fuse
- L/4.8 m KZ m Hb (HE) - 1,030 kg. (80 kg. bursting charge) High-explosive shell, front fuse
- L/4.6 m Bd Z Hb (SAP)- 1,030 kg. (45 kg. bursting charge) High-explosive shell, rear fuse

== Coastal artillery projectiles ==
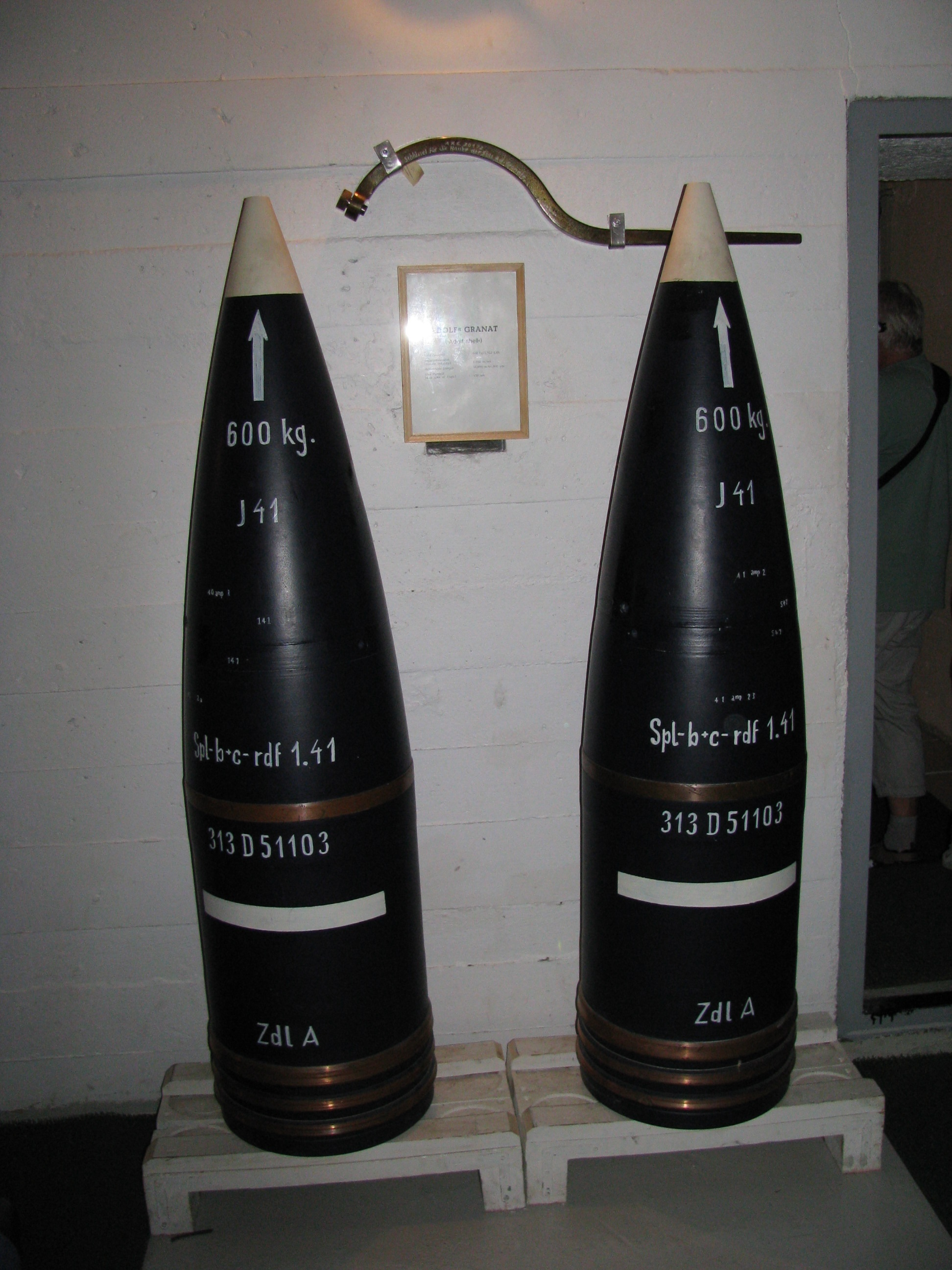
600 kg "Adolf" shells with extended range; Harstad

- L/4.2 m KZ m Hb (Adolf) (HE)- 600 kg. 50 kg. bursting charge. Both front and rear fuse
- L/4.1 m KZ m Hb (HE) - 610 kg. 50 kg. bursting charge.

== See also ==
- List of the largest cannon by caliber

=== Weapons of comparable role, performance and era ===
- 16"/45 caliber Mark 6 gun and 16"/50 caliber Mark 7 gun US equivalents
- BL 16 inch Mk I naval gun British equivalent
- 41 cm/45 3rd Year Type naval gun Japanese equivalent
