= Hopvatnet =

Lake in Nordland county, Norway

- Interactive map of the lake
- Location: Steigen Municipality, Nordland
- Coordinates: 67.8058°N 15.6516°E
- Basin countries: Norway
- Max. length: 5 kilometres (3.1 mi)
- Max. width: 1 kilometre (0.62 mi)
- Surface area: 3.83 km^{2} (1.48 sq mi)
- Shore length^{1}: 15 kilometres (9.3 mi)
- Surface elevation: 5 metres (16 ft)
- References: NVE
- ^{1} Shore length is not a well-defined measure.

Hopvatnet is a lake in Steigen Municipality in Nordland county, Norway. The 3.83-square-kilometre (1.48 sq mi) lake lies about 15 kilometres (9.3 mi) northeast of the village of Nordfold. The lake is located just above sea level and it empties into the nearby Nordfolda branch of the Folda fjord.

== See also ==
- List of lakes in Norway
