= Leines =

Village in Steigen Municipality, Norway

- Village
- Interactive map of Leines
- Location within Nordland Location within Norway
- Coordinates: 66.0438°N 12.7028°E
- Country: Norway
- Region: Northern Norway
- County: Nordland
- District: Salten
- Municipality: Steigen Municipality
- Elevation: 18 m (59 ft)
- Time zone: UTC+01:00 (CET)
  - Summer (DST): UTC+02:00 (CEST)
- Post Code: 8285 Leines

Leines is a small village in Steigen Municipality in Nordland county, Norway. It is located on the southern shore of the mouth of the Leinesfjorden, about 20 kilometres (12 mi) west of Nordfold. The villages of Leinesfjorden and Sørskot are located a few kilometres across the fjord on the opposite shore. Leiranger Church is located in Leines.
