= Måløy–Skarholmen Lighthouse =

Coastal lighthouse in Steigen, Norway

Måløy–Skarholmen Lighthouse Måløy–Skarholmen fyrstasjon
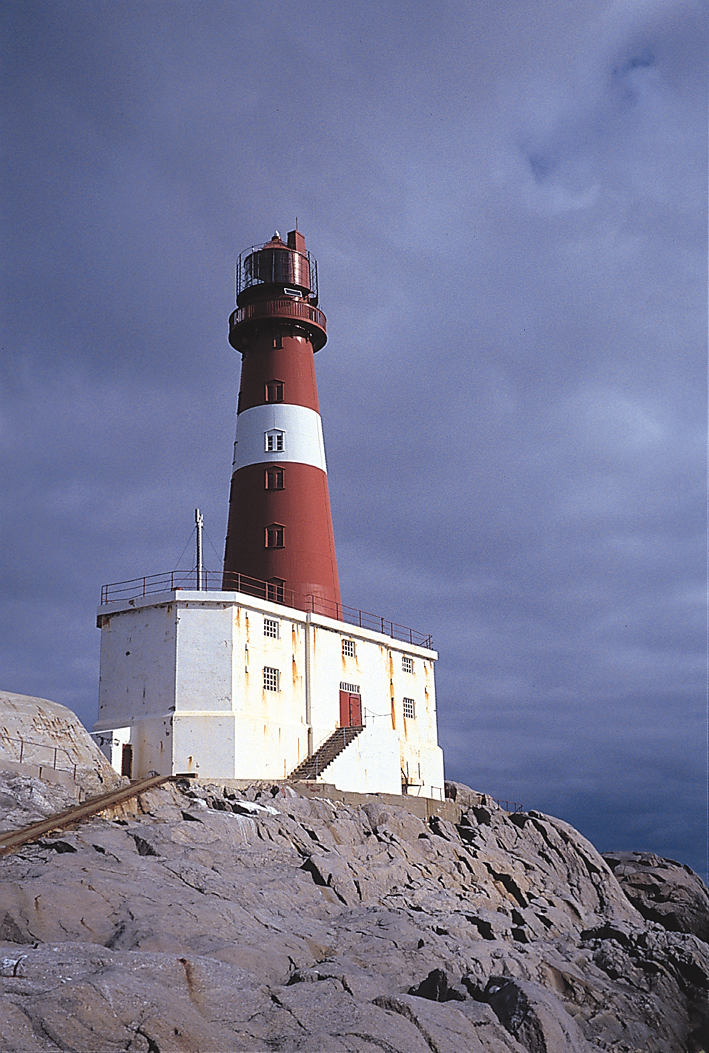
- View of the lighthouse
- Location of the lighthouse
- Location: Nordland, Norway
- Coordinates: 67°46′04″N 14°24′04″E

Tower
- Constructed: 1922
- Construction: cast iron
- Automated: 1979
- Height: 34.2 metres (112 ft)
- Shape: cylindrical
- Markings: red with 1 white stripe
- Heritage: cultural heritage preservation in Norway
- Racon: M

Light
- Focal height: 42.3 metres (139 ft)
- Lens: original 2nd order Fresnel lens
- Intensity: 139,100 candela
- Range: Red: 17.1 nmi (31.7 km; 19.7 mi) Green: 15.5 nmi (28.7 km; 17.8 mi) White: 18 nmi (33 km; 21 mi)
- Characteristic: Oc WRG 8s
- Norway no.: 711000

Måløy–Skarholmen Lighthouse (Norwegian: Måløy–Skarholmen fyr) is a coastal lighthouse in Steigen Municipality in Nordland county, Norway. The lighthouse marks the entrance to the upper Vestfjorden, the broad sound between the mainland and the Lofoten Islands. It is located on the tiny islet of Måløyvær, about 25 kilometres (16 mi) straight west of the village of Leinesfjorden. It was first established in 1922 and was automated in 1979. It was listed as a protected site in 1999.

The light burns year-round except between 2 May and 4 August each year when it is unnecessary due to the midnight sun. The light is located at an elevation of 42.3 metres (139 ft) above sea level. The light is white, red, or green depending on direction, occulting twice every 8 seconds. The 139,100-candela light can be seen for up to 18 nautical miles (33 km; 21 mi). The 34-metre (112 ft) tall round cast iron tower is centered on a 2-story concrete block keeper's house. The tower is painted red with one white horizontal band and the keeper's house is painted white. The house has dwelling units for three keepers and was in use until the lighthouse was automated in 1979.

== See also ==
- Lighthouses in Norway
- List of lighthouses in Norway
