= Bogen Chapel (Steigen) =

Church in Nordland, Norway

- Bogen kapell
- Bogen Chapel
- 67.8976975°N 15.19708915°E
- Location: Steigen Municipality, Nordland
- Country: Norway
- Denomination: Church of Norway
- Churchmanship: Evangelical Lutheran

History
- Status: Chapel
- Founded: 1926
- Consecrated: 16 June 1926

Architecture
- Functional status: Active
- Architect: Sverre Kristiansen
- Architectural type: Long church
- Completed: 1926 (100 years ago)

Specifications
- Materials: Wood

Administration
- Diocese: Sør-Hålogaland
- Deanery: Salten prosti
- Parish: Steigen
- Norwegian Cultural Heritage Site
- Type: Church
- Status: Not protected
- ID: 83922

Bogen Chapel (Norwegian: Bogen kapell) is a chapel of the Church of Norway in Steigen Municipality in Nordland county, Norway. It is located in the village of Leirvikbogen. It is an annex chapel in the Steigen parish which is part of the Salten prosti (deanery) in the Diocese of Sør-Hålogaland. The white, wooden chapel was built in a long church style in 1926 using plans drawn up by the architect Sverre Kristiansen. In 1945, the chapel was temporarily occupied by the invading German army and used as a barracks for several months. In 1972, the chapel was extensively remodeled and restored.

== See also ==
- List of churches in Sør-Hålogaland
