= Engeløy Airport, Grådussan =

Airport in Steigen, Norway

Engeløy Airport, Grådussan Engeløy flyplass, Grådussan
- IATA: none; ICAO: ENEN

Summary
- Location: Engeløya, Steigen, Norway
- Elevation AMSL: 3 m / 10 ft
- Coordinates: 67°58′02″N 014°59′33″E
- Website: engeloyflyplass.no

Map
- Location within Norway

Runways
Direction	Length		Surface
Direction	m	ft	Surface
05/23	600	1,969	Grass
- Reference: ENEN Aerodrome Chart

Engeløy Airport, Grådussan (Norwegian: Engeløy flyplass, Grådussan) (ICAO: ENEN) is an airport located on the northwest tip of Engeløya, an island in Steigen Municipality in Nordland county, Norway.

The airport was built in 2009 and opened in earnest in 2010. It has a grass runway designated 05/23 which measures 600 by 22 metres (1,969 ft × 72 ft). The airport is usable most of the year, but runway conditions must always be checked in advance. Approval from the owners is required before use (PPR).
