= Steigen Church =

Church in Nordland, Norway

- Steigen kirke
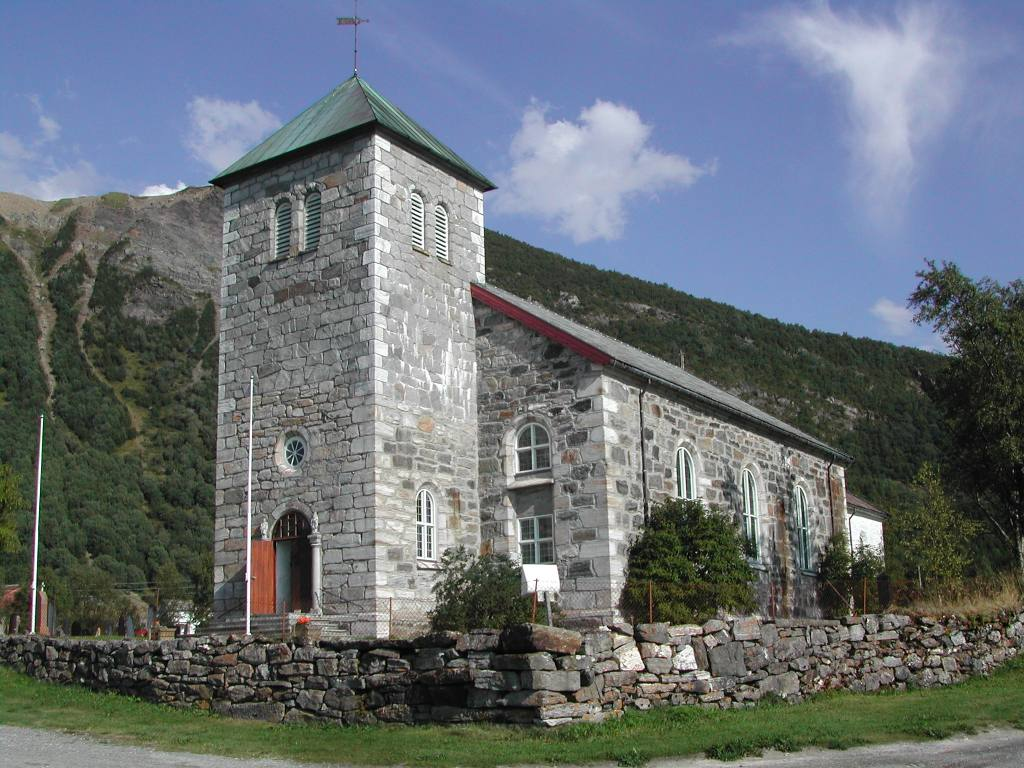
- View of the church
- Steigen Church
- 67.9360983°N 14.9795086°E
- Location: Steigen Municipality, Nordland
- Country: Norway
- Denomination: Church of Norway
- Previous denomination: Catholic Church
- Churchmanship: Evangelical Lutheran

History
- Status: Parish church
- Founded: 11th century
- Consecrated: c. 1250

Architecture
- Functional status: Active
- Architectural type: Long church
- Completed: c. 1250 (776 years ago)

Specifications
- Capacity: 400
- Materials: Stone

Administration
- Deanery: Salten prosti
- Parish: Steigen
- Norwegian Cultural Heritage Site
- Type: Church
- Status: Automatically protected
- ID: 85561

Steigen Church (Norwegian: Steigen kirke) is a parish church of the Church of Norway in Steigen Municipality in Nordland county, Norway. It is located in the small village of Steigen on the southwestern side of the island of Engeløya. It is the main church for the Steigen parish which is part of the Salten prosti (deanery) in the Diocese of Sør-Hålogaland. The brown and gray, stone church was originally built in a long church style around the year 1250, and it has since been renovated and expanded several times. The church seats about 400 people.

== History ==
The earliest existing records of the church at Steigen date back to 1432, however there are records of the priest of Steigen dating back to 1321. The church building was likely built around the year 1250 based on archaeological excavations around the building. There is evidence that there was an earlier wooden church on the same site as well as a Christian graveyard under what is now the site of the church. This first church was likely built during the 11th century.

The present stone church was originally rectangular measuring about 23 by 11.4 metres (75 ft × 37 ft). In 1868-1869, the church was expanded. The western part of the church was torn down and rebuilt in the long church style. The remaining eastern half of the old building was converted into the chancel and a new nave and tower was built on the west end of the old building.

== Tombs ==
Underneath the church, there is a large basement tomb that was historically used for the local upper classes and priests and their families. There are about 300 people buried underneath Steigen Church. There is a stairway by the altar in the front of the church that leads down to the tomb. In 1805, there was a ban on burying people inside of a church, so the remains under the church are all very old. Only some of the remains are inside a coffin, and only eight of the remains have nameplates by them.

== Media gallery ==
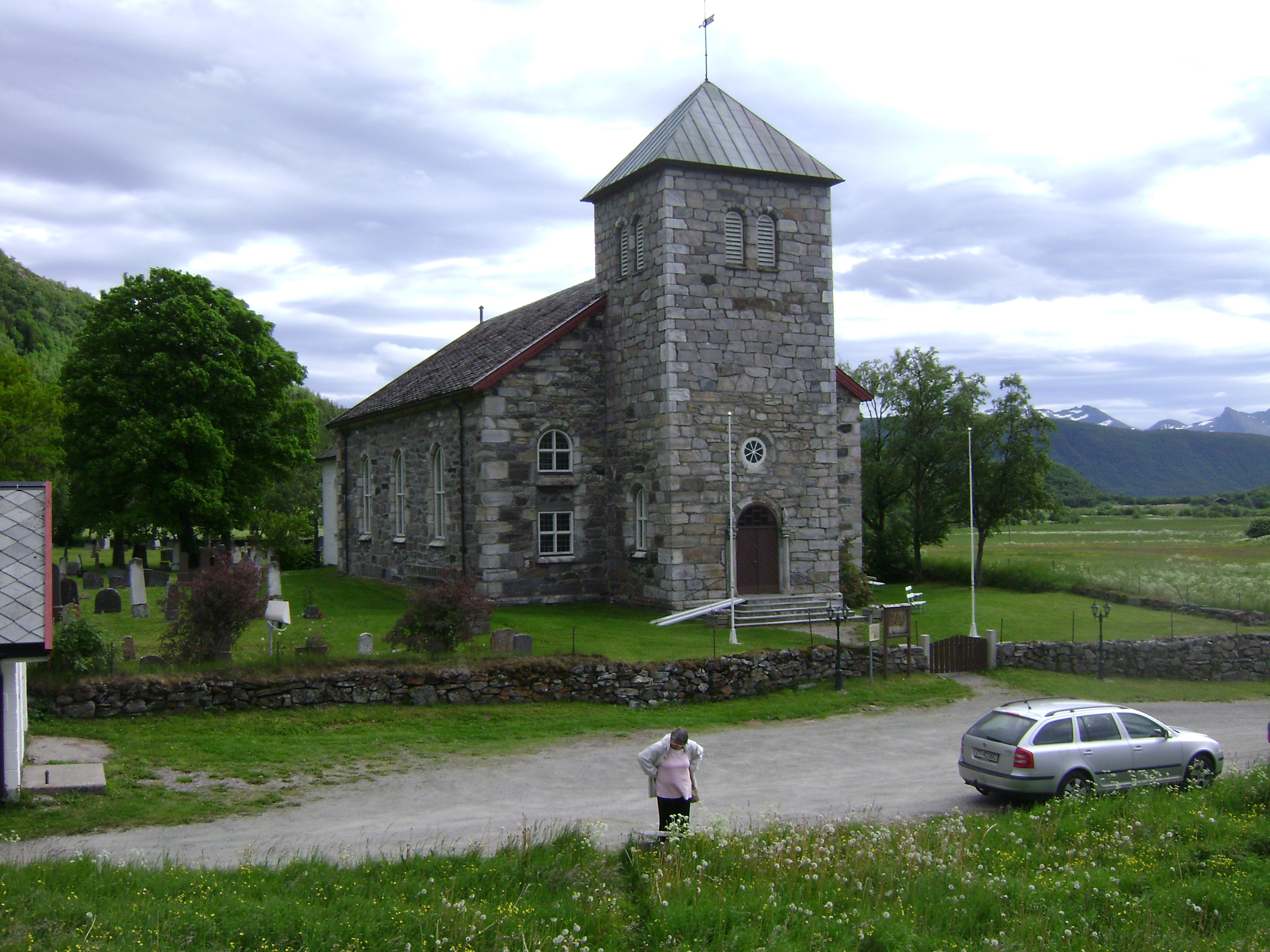

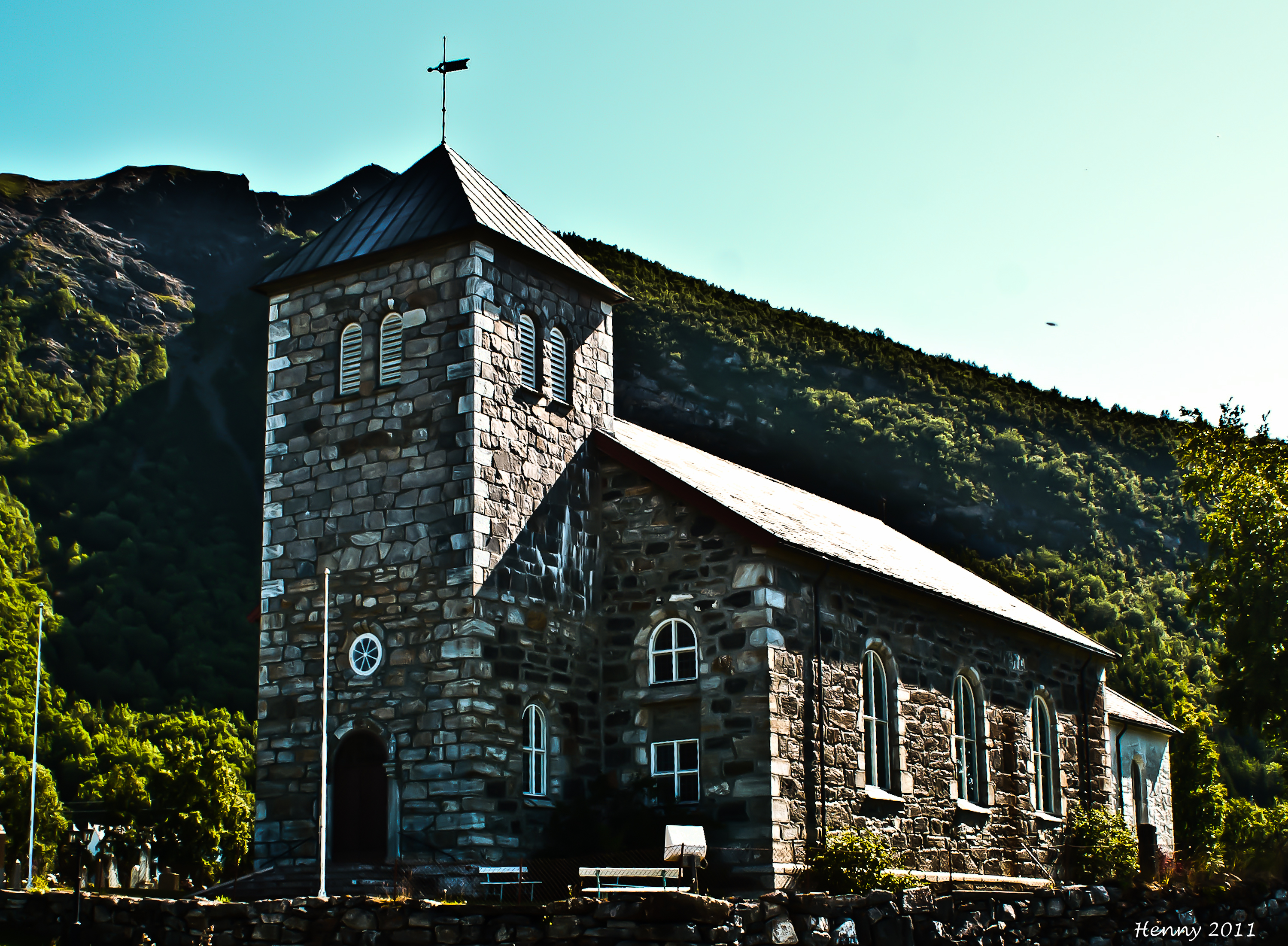

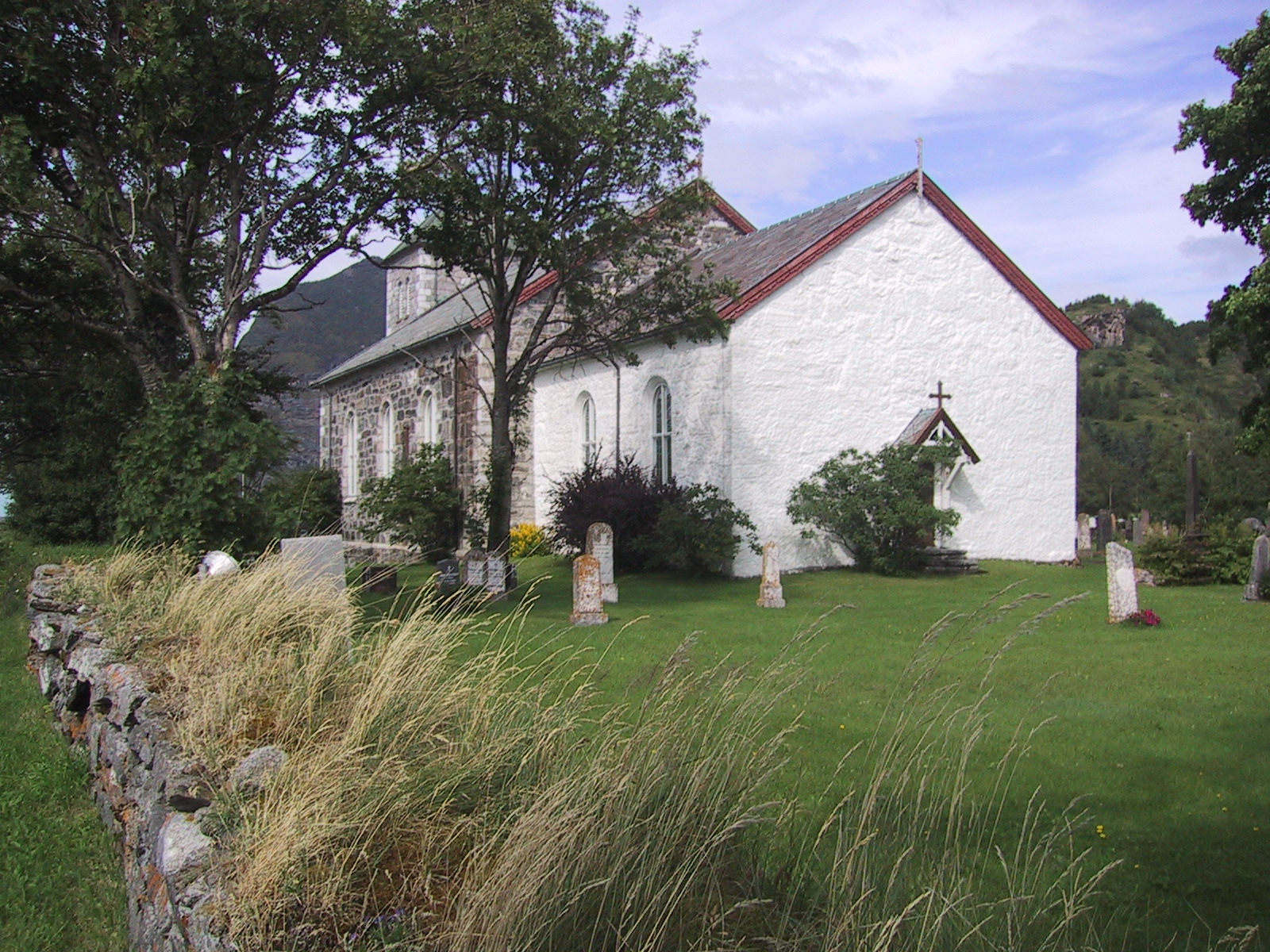

== See also ==
- List of churches in Sør-Hålogaland
