= Straumfjordvatnet =

Lake in Nordland, Norway

- Interactive map of the lake
- Location: Steigen Municipality, Nordland
- Coordinates: 67.8853°N 15.5039°E
- Basin countries: Norway
- Max. length: 5 kilometres (3.1 mi)
- Max. width: 1 kilometre (0.62 mi)
- Surface area: 3.72 km^{2} (1.44 sq mi)
- Shore length^{1}: 14.37 kilometres (8.93 mi)
- Surface elevation: 0 metres (0 ft)
- References: NVE
- ^{1} Shore length is not a well-defined measure.

Straumfjordvatnet is a lake in Steigen Municipality in Nordland county, Norway. The 3.72-square-kilometre (1.44 sq mi) lake lies about 15 kilometres (9.3 mi) east of the village of Bogen.

== See also ==
- List of lakes in Norway
