= Leirvikbogen =

Village in Steigen Municipality, Norway

Leirvikbogen Bogen
- Village
- Interactive map of Leirvikbogen
- Location within Nordland Location within Norway
- Coordinates: 67.8987°N 15.1925°E
- Country: Norway
- Region: Northern Norway
- County: Nordland
- District: Salten
- Municipality: Steigen Municipality
- Elevation: 16 m (52 ft)
- Time zone: UTC+01:00 (CET)
  - Summer (DST): UTC+02:00 (CEST)
- Post Code: 8288 Bogøy

Leirvikbogen or simply Bogen is a village in Steigen Municipality in Nordland county, Norway. It is located about 15 kilometres (9.3 mi) northeast of the municipal centre of Leinesfjorden. The Engeløy Bridges connect Leirvikbogen to the nearby island of Engeløya to the north. Leirvikbogen and its surrounding villages have a total of about 210 residents (2016). Bogen Chapel is located in the village.
