= Steigen Tunnel =

Road tunnel in Nordland, Norway

- Interactive map of Steigen Tunnel

Overview
- Location: Nordland, Norway
- Coordinates: 67.9279°N 15.7616°E
- Status: In use
- Route: Fv835
- Start: Tømmerneset
- End: Forsan

Operation
- Opened: 1990
- Operator: Statens vegvesen
- Traffic: Automotive

Technical
- Length: 8,079 metres (5.0 mi)
- No. of lanes: 1
- Tunnel clearance: 4.2 metres (14 ft)
- Width: 6.5 metres (21 ft)

The Steigen Tunnel (Norwegian: Steigentunnelen) is a road tunnel in Nordland county, Norway. The 8,079-metre (5.02 mi) long tunnel is located on the Norwegian County Road 835 highway in Hamarøy Municipality and Steigen Municipality. The tunnel begins at the village of Tømmerneset in Hamarøy Municipality and heads northwest through the Veggfjellan mountain to the northwest, exiting the mountain at the Forsan farm in Steigen Municipality. The tunnel is 6.5 metres (21 ft) wide and has an interior height of about 4.2 metres (14 ft).

The tunnel was completed in 1990 and from 1990 until 2005, it was the longest road tunnel in Nordland county. The Steigen Tunnel gave Steigen Municipality a ferry-free road connection. Prior to 1990, the only way to get to Steigen Municipality was by using the ferries between Skutvika and Leirvikbogen and between Røsvika and Nordfold. After the tunnel opened, those two ferry routes were closed.

Like many other tunnels in Norway, the Steigen Tunnel is plagued with condensation problems. The condensation can lead to dangerous situations because car windows will suddenly fog up when one enters the tunnel.
