= Sørskot Chapel =

Church in Nordland, Norway

- Sørskot kapell
- Sørskot Chapel
- 67.810339°N 14.7942924°E
- Location: Steigen Municipality, Nordland
- Country: Norway
- Denomination: Church of Norway
- Churchmanship: Evangelical Lutheran

History
- Status: Chapel
- Founded: 1977
- Consecrated: 22 April 1977

Architecture
- Functional status: Active
- Architectural type: Rectangular
- Completed: 1953 (73 years ago)

Specifications
- Capacity: 70
- Materials: Wood

Administration
- Diocese: Sør-Hålogaland
- Deanery: Salten prosti
- Parish: Leiranger
- Norwegian Cultural Heritage Site
- Type: Church
- Status: Automatically protected

Sørskot Chapel (Norwegian: Sørskot kapell) is a chapel of the Church of Norway in Steigen Municipality in Nordland county, Norway. It is located in the village of Sørskot. It is an annex chapel in the Leiranger parish which is part of the Salten prosti (deanery) in the Diocese of Sør-Hålogaland. The white, wooden chapel (with attached church hall) was built in a rectangular style in 1953 as a school, but on 22 April 1977 it was consecrated for use by the Church of Norway. The chapel seats about 70 people.

== See also ==
- List of churches in Sør-Hålogaland
