= Steigen Municipality =

Municipality in Nordland, Norway

Steigen Municipality Steigen kommune
- Municipality
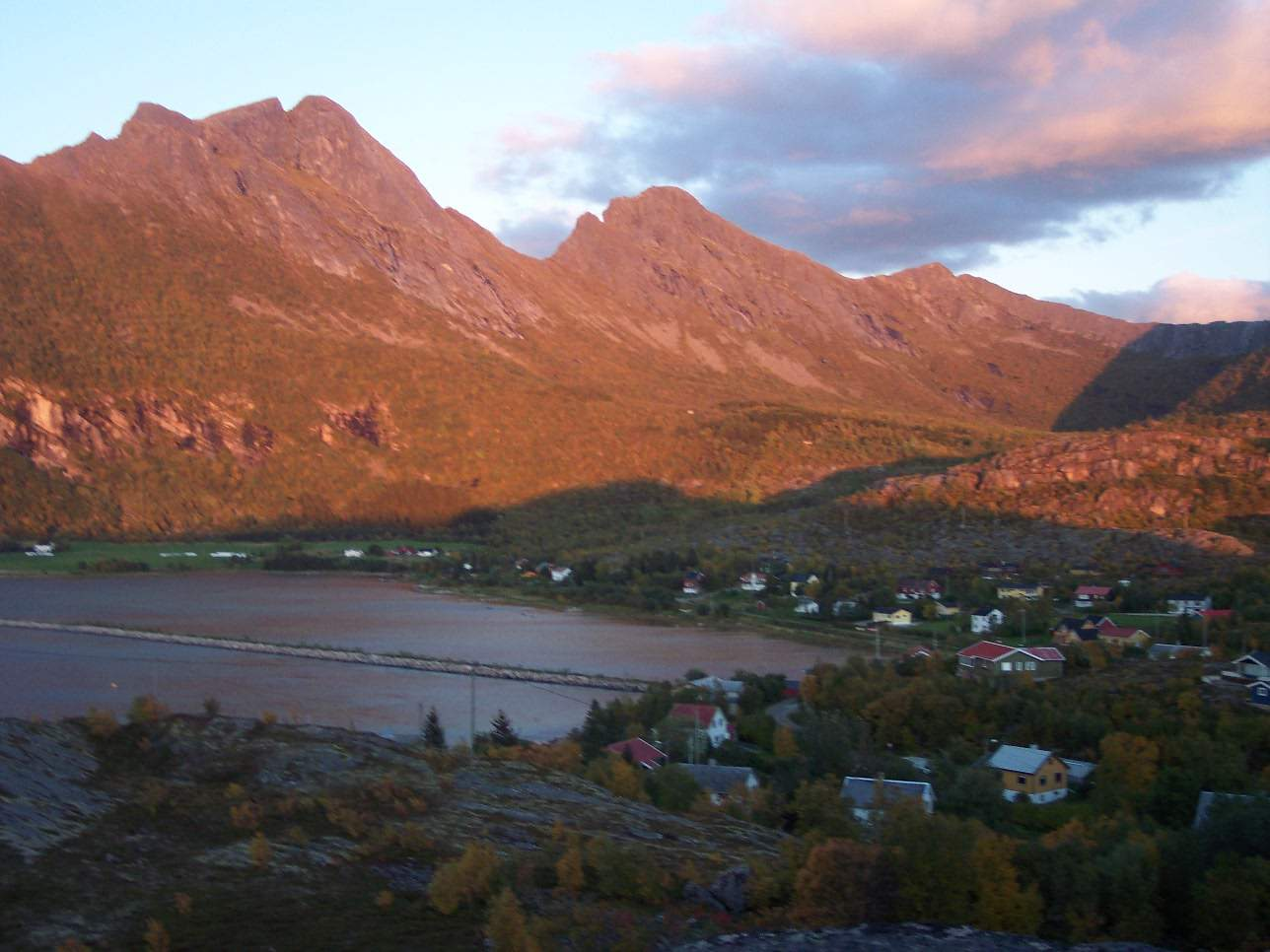
- View of the village of Nordskot

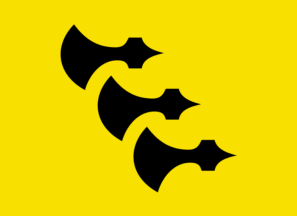
- Flag Coat of arms

- Nordland within Norway

- Steigen within Nordland
- Coordinates: 67°47′54″N 15°10′19″E
- Country: Norway
- County: Nordland
- District: Salten
- Established: 1 Jan 1838
  - Created as: Formannskapsdistrikt
- Administrative centre: Leinesfjorden

Government
  - Mayor (2019): Aase Refsnes (SV)

Area
  - Total: 1,009.26 km^{2} (389.68 sq mi)
  - Land: 963.58 km^{2} (372.04 sq mi)
  - Water: 45.68 km^{2} (17.64 sq mi) 4.5%
  - Rank: #114 in Norway
- Highest elevation: 1,351.15 m (4,432.9 ft)

Population (2024)
  - Total: 2,672
  - Rank: #245 in Norway
  - Density: 2.6/km^{2} (6.7/sq mi)
  - Change (10 years): ▲ +3.6%
- Demonym: Steigværing

Official language
  - Norwegian form: Bokmål
- Time zone: UTC+01:00 (CET)
  - Summer (DST): UTC+02:00 (CEST)
- ISO 3166 code: NO-1848
- Website: Official website

Steigen (Norwegian pronunciation: [ˈstæɪɡn̩]) is a municipality in Nordland county, Norway. It is part of the traditional district of Salten. The administrative centre of the municipality is the village of Leinesfjorden. Other villages include Leirvikbogen, Leines, Nordfold, Nordskot, and Sørskot. Engeløy Airport, Grådussan is located in the northern part of the municipality. Måløy–Skarholmen Lighthouse is located in the Vestfjorden in the western part of the municipality. The only road access to the municipality is via the Steigen Tunnel.

The 1,009-square-kilometre (390 sq mi) municipality is the 114th largest by area out of the 357 municipalities in Norway. Steigen Municipality is the 245th most populous municipality in Norway with a population of 2,672. The municipality's population density is 2.6 inhabitants per square kilometre (6.7/sq mi) and its population has increased by 3.6% over the previous 10-year period.

== General information ==
The municipality of Steigen was established on 1 January 1838 (see formannskapsdistrikt law). The southern part of Steigen Municipality was separated on 1 September 1900 to form the new Ledingen Municipality. This left 2,216 residents in Steigen Municipality.

During the 1960s, there were many municipal mergers across Norway due to the work of the Schei Committee. On 1 January 1964, a major municipal merger took place. A new Steigen Municipality was created by the merging the following areas:

- all of Steigen Municipality (population: 1,829)
- all of Leiranger Municipality (population: 1,397)
- most of Nordfold Municipality except the Mørsvikbotn area (population: 1,212)
- the small Brennsund area of Kjerringøy Municipality (population: 30)
- the part of Hamarøy Municipality that was south of the Sagfjorden and between the lake Storvatnet and the Veggfjellan mountain area (population: 77)

Prior to the merger, the population of Steigen Municipality was 1,843, and after the merger, the new municipality had 4,545 residents.

=== Name ===
The municipality (originally the parish) is named after the old Steigen farm (Old Norse: Steig) since the first Steigen Church was built there. The name is derived from the verb stíga which means "mount" or "rise". This is referring to the high and steep mountain Steigtinden (-tinden means "the peak") behind the farm.

=== Coat of arms ===
The coat of arms was granted on 12 October 1988, but they were not formally approved by the government until 11 January 1991. The official blazon is "Or three axe blades sable in bend" (Norwegian: I gull tre svarte øksehoder i skrå rekke). This means the arms have a field (background) that has a tincture of Or which means it is commonly colored yellow, but if it is made out of metal, then gold is used. The charge is three axe heads from the Viking Age that are lined up diagonally. The design was chosen to represent the Viking history of the municipality. There are three axe heads to represent that three municipalities were merged in 1964 to form the present municipality. The arms were designed by Henry Tømmerås, the municipal cultural secretary at the time.

=== Churches ===
The Church of Norway has three parishes (sokn) within Steigen Municipality. It is part of the Salten prosti (deanery) in the Diocese of Sør-Hålogaland.

Churches in Steigen Municipality
Parish (sokn)	Church name	Location of the church	Year built
Leiranger	Leiranger Church	Leines	1911
Leiranger	Leinesfjord Chapel	Leinesfjorden	1912
Leiranger	Sørskot Chapel	Sørskot	1953
Nordfold	Nordfold Church	Nordfold	1976
Steigen	Steigen Church	Steigen (Engeløya)	1250
Steigen	Bogen Chapel	Leirvikbogen	1926

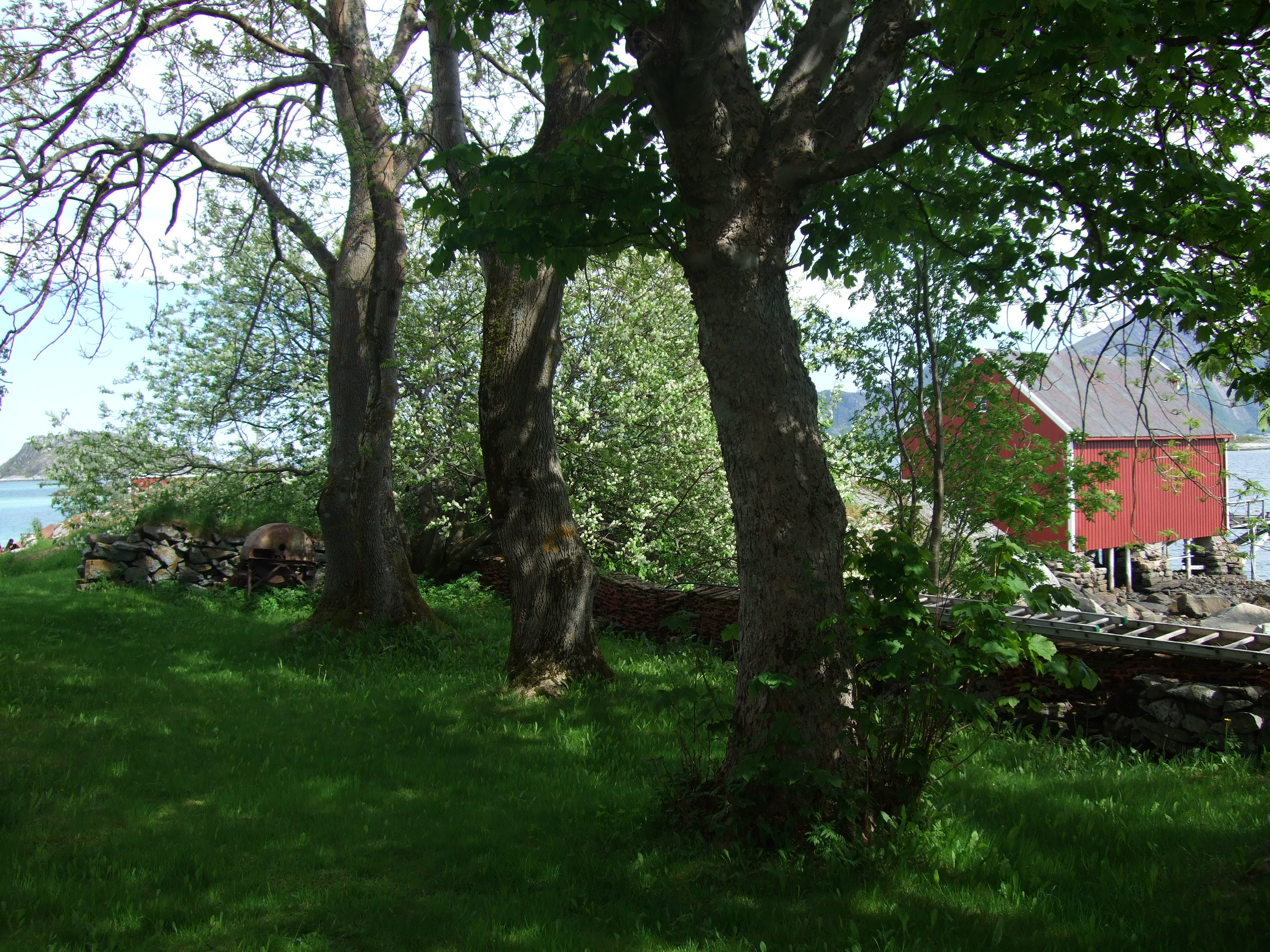
Part of the old garden at Løvøy

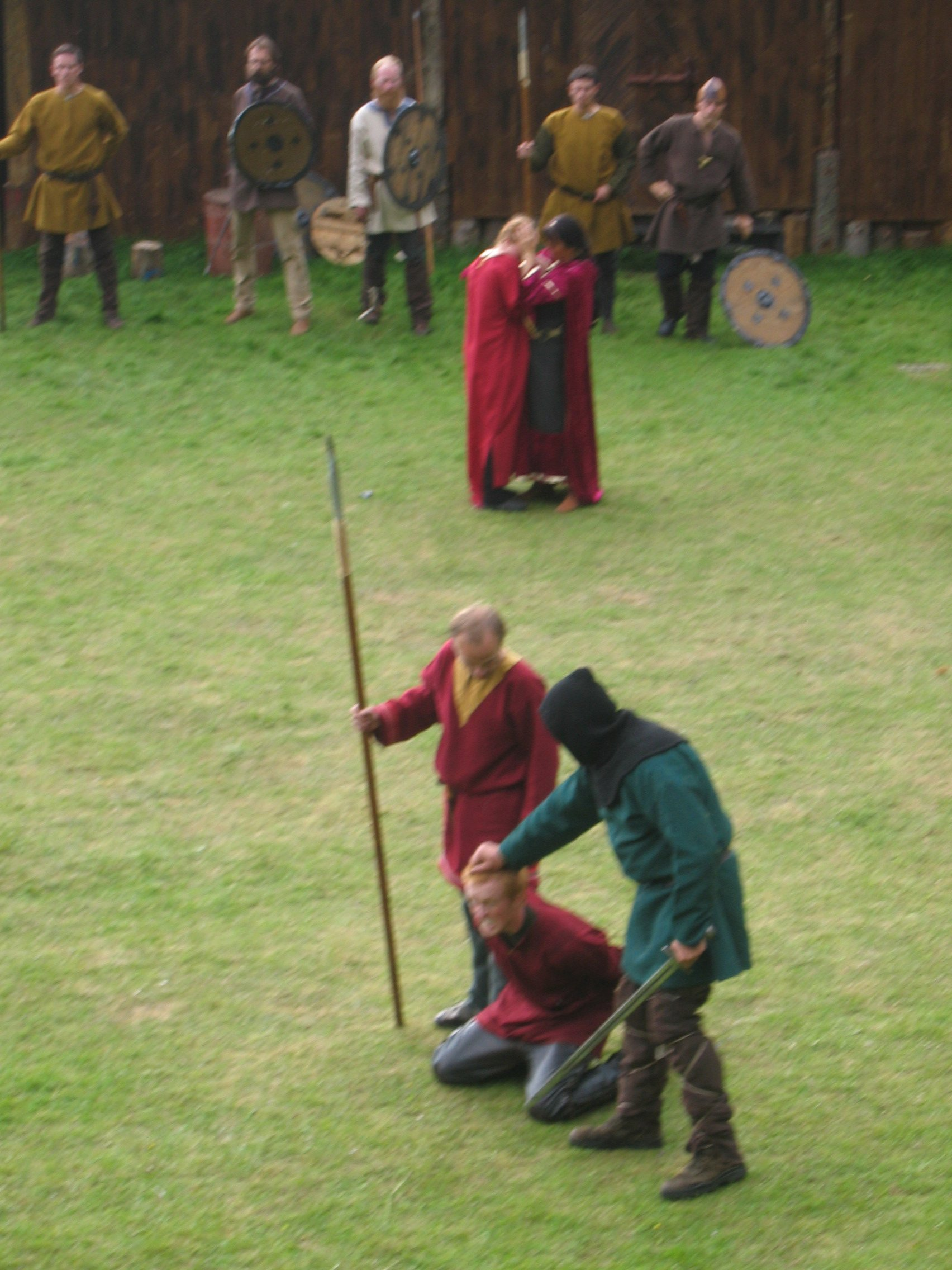
Steigen Sagaspill (historical play), based on an old tale

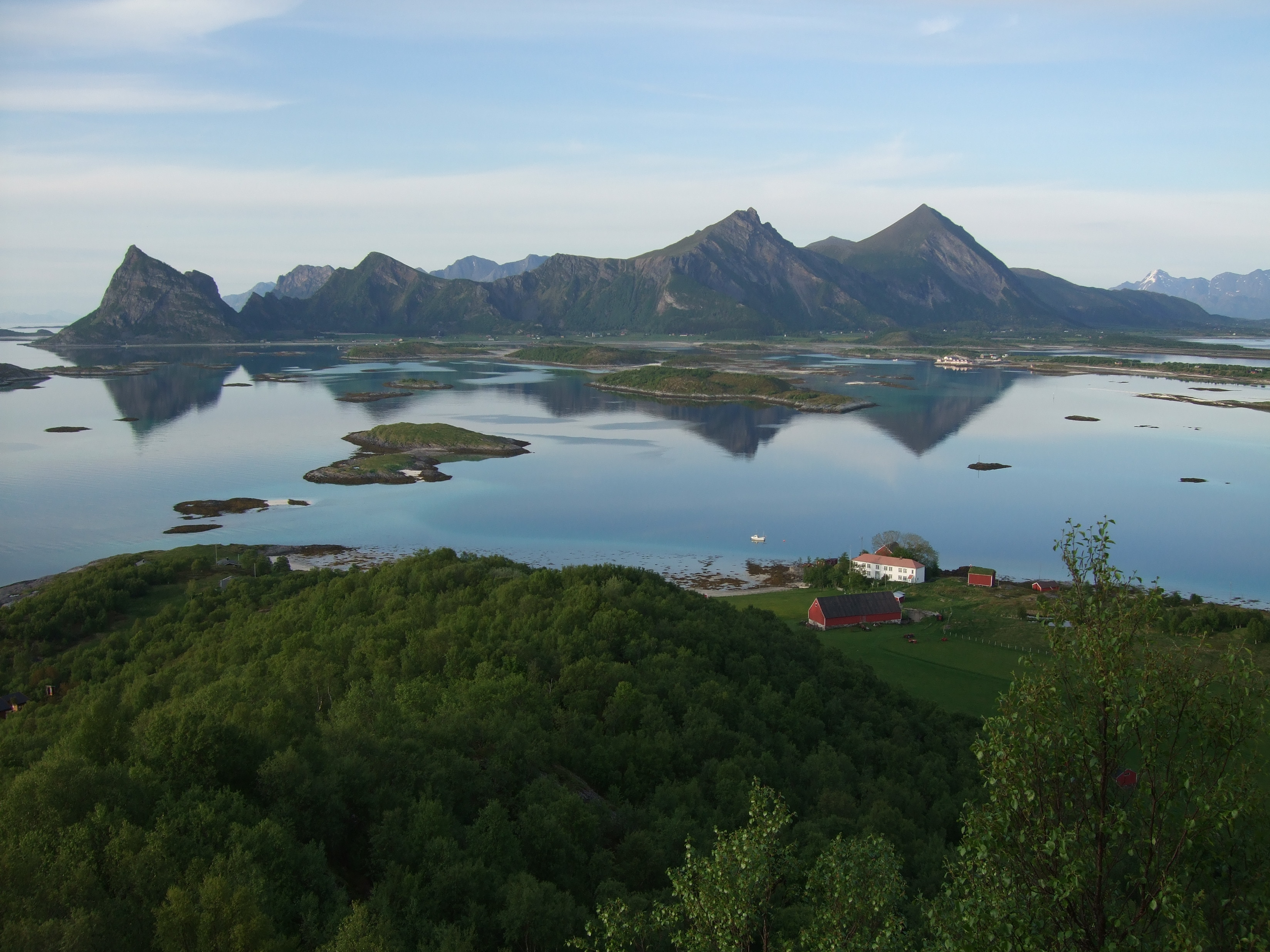
Løvøy old trading centre in Steigen

== Geography ==
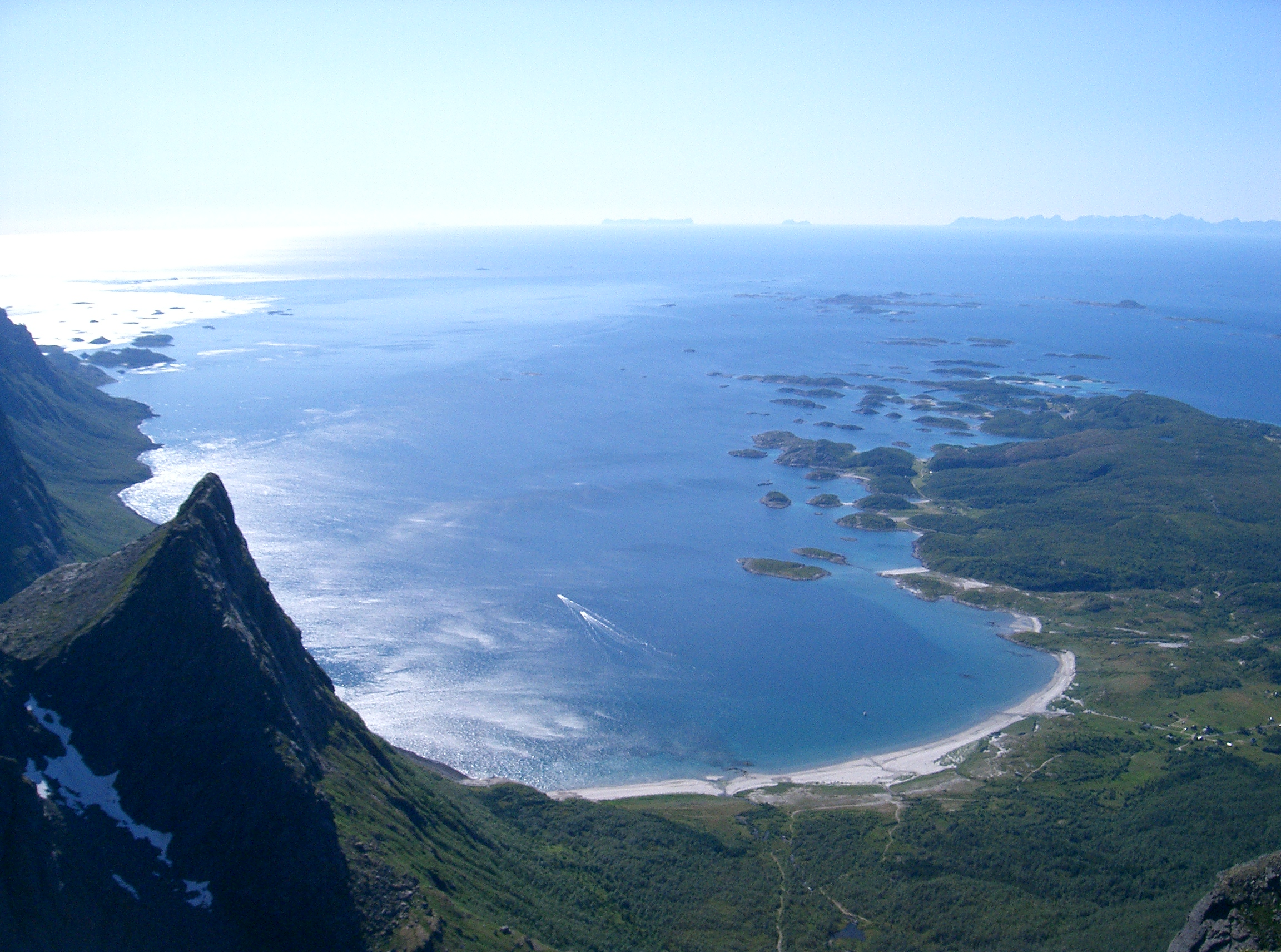
Brennviksanden beach and Vestfjord seen from the 1048 m high mountain Kråktind

The municipality is located along the coast of the Vestfjorden, about 100 kilometres (62 mi) north of the town of Bodø, well inside the Arctic Circle. The road to Steigen departs from European route E6 and makes use of the 8 kilometres (5.0 mi) long Steigentunnelen (see World's longest tunnels). Steigen borders Hamarøy Municipality in the north and Sørfold Municipality to the south. The Vestfjorden and Lofoten are located west of Steigen. The Sagfjorden lies on the north and the Folda fjord in the south.

The municipality is mainly located on a peninsula dissected by many fjords. Steigen also includes several islands. The largest island is Engeløya, where there are ancient burial mounds (such as Sigarshaugen) and the world's most northerly naturally occurring Hazel forest in Prestegårdsskogen Nature Reserve. The largest glacier is Helldalsisen encircling a 1,361 metres (4,465 ft) mountain. The island of Engeløya is connected to the mainland by the Engeløy Bridges and just to the north of that lies the uninhabited island of Lundøya. The highest point in the municipality is the 1,351.15-metre (4,432.9 ft) tall mountain Helldalisen.

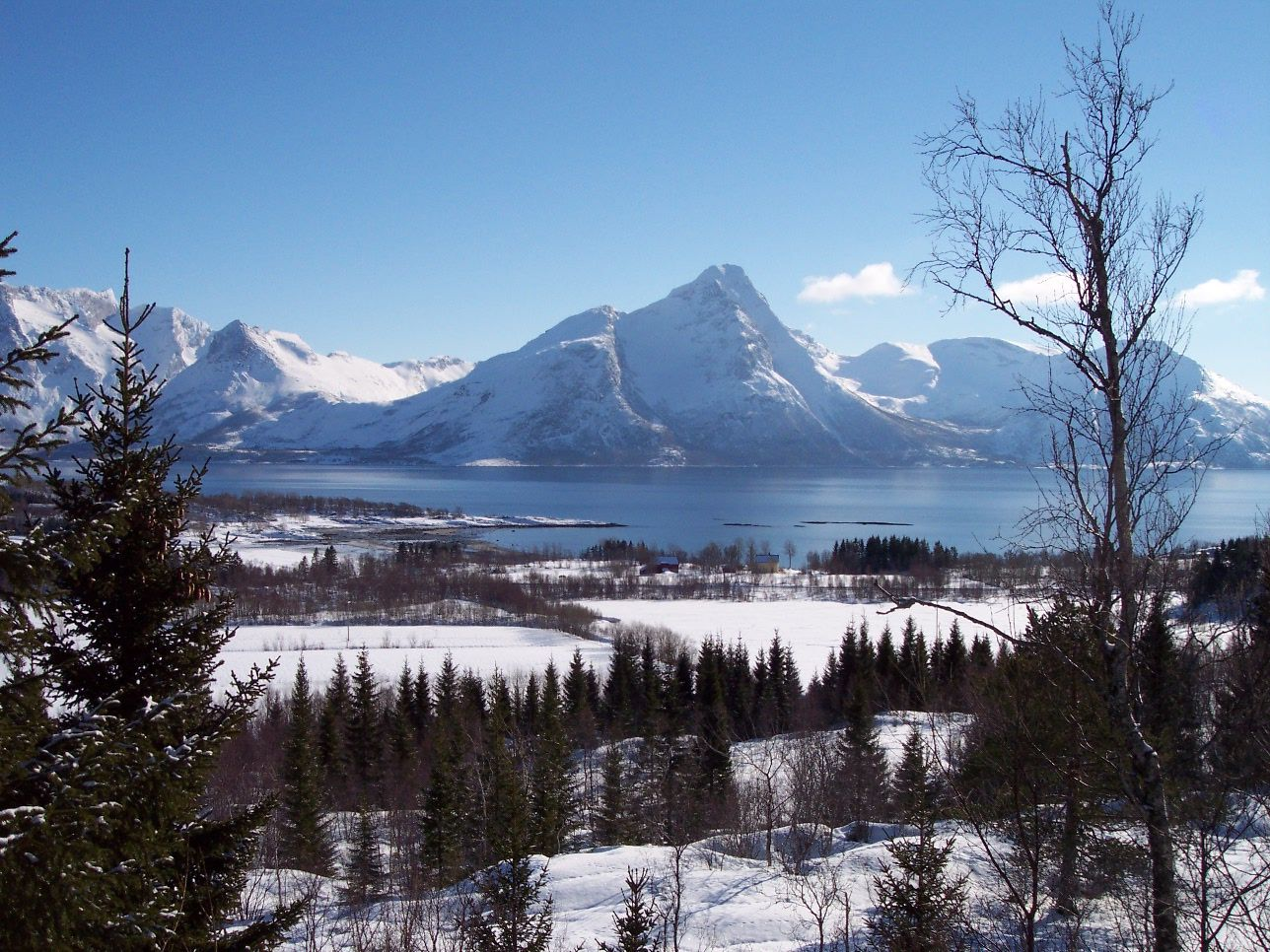
Steigen winter panorama

Steigen has fertile lowlands in between the mountains and the sea. There are several archeological sites showing settlements from the Bronze Age, Iron Age, and Viking Age. Lakes in the region include Forsanvatnet, Hopvatnet, Makkvatnet, and Straumfjordvatnet.

=== Climate ===
The monthly 24-hr averages range from −1 °C (30 °F) in January and February to 13 °C (55 °F) in July and August, with precipitation ranging from 49 millimetres (1.9 in) in May to 146 millimetres (5.7 in) in October; annual average is 970 millimetres (38.2 in) and mean annual temperature is 5.1 °C (41 °F).

== Government ==
Steigen Municipality is responsible for primary education (through 10th grade), outpatient health services, senior citizen services, welfare and other social services, zoning, economic development, and municipal roads and utilities. The municipality is governed by a municipal council of directly elected representatives. The mayor is indirectly elected by a vote of the municipal council. The municipality is under the jurisdiction of the Salten og Lofoten District Court and the Hålogaland Court of Appeal.

=== Municipal council ===
The municipal council (Kommunestyre) of Steigen Municipality is made up of 17 representatives that are elected for four year terms. The tables below show the current and historical composition of the council by political party.

Steigen kommunestyre 2023–2027
Party name (in Norwegian)	Number of representatives
Labour Party (Arbeiderpartiet)	4
Progress Party (Fremskrittspartiet)	1
Conservative Party (Høyre)	2
Red Party (Rødt)	1
Centre Party (Senterpartiet)	3
Socialist Left Party (Sosialistisk Venstreparti)	5
Liberal Party (Venstre)	1
Total number of members:	17

Steigen kommunestyre 2019–2023
Party name (in Norwegian)	Number of representatives
Labour Party (Arbeiderpartiet)	3
Progress Party (Fremskrittspartiet)	1
Conservative Party (Høyre)	1
Red Party (Rødt)	1
Centre Party (Senterpartiet)	7
Socialist Left Party (Sosialistisk Venstreparti)	3
Liberal Party (Venstre)	1
Total number of members:	17

Steigen kommunestyre 2015–2019
Party name (in Norwegian)	Number of representatives
Labour Party (Arbeiderpartiet)	4
Progress Party (Fremskrittspartiet)	1
Conservative Party (Høyre)	2
Pensioners' Party (Pensjonistpartiet)	1
Red Party (Rødt)	2
Centre Party (Senterpartiet)	5
Socialist Left Party (Sosialistisk Venstreparti)	1
Liberal Party (Venstre)	1
Total number of members:	17

Steigen kommunestyre 2011–2015
Party name (in Norwegian)	Number of representatives
Labour Party (Arbeiderpartiet)	4
Progress Party (Fremskrittspartiet)	1
Conservative Party (Høyre)	1
Christian Democratic Party (Kristelig Folkeparti)	1
Pensioners' Party (Pensjonistpartiet)	2
Red Party (Rødt)	1
Centre Party (Senterpartiet)	3
Socialist Left Party (Sosialistisk Venstreparti)	1
Liberal Party (Venstre)	3
Total number of members:	17

Steigen kommunestyre 2007–2011
Party name (in Norwegian)	Number of representatives
Labour Party (Arbeiderpartiet)	4
Progress Party (Fremskrittspartiet)	2
Conservative Party (Høyre)	1
Christian Democratic Party (Kristelig Folkeparti)	1
Centre Party (Senterpartiet)	6
Socialist Left Party (Sosialistisk Venstreparti)	1
Liberal Party (Venstre)	2
Total number of members:	17

Steigen kommunestyre 2003–2007
Party name (in Norwegian)	Number of representatives
Labour Party (Arbeiderpartiet)	4
Progress Party (Fremskrittspartiet)	1
Conservative Party (Høyre)	1
Christian Democratic Party (Kristelig Folkeparti)	1
Centre Party (Senterpartiet)	5
Socialist Left Party (Sosialistisk Venstreparti)	2
Liberal Party (Venstre)	3
Total number of members:	17

Steigen kommunestyre 1999–2003
Party name (in Norwegian)	Number of representatives
Labour Party (Arbeiderpartiet)	6
Conservative Party (Høyre)	3
Christian Democratic Party (Kristelig Folkeparti)	1
Centre Party (Senterpartiet)	5
Socialist Left Party (Sosialistisk Venstreparti)	1
Liberal Party (Venstre)	2
Cross-party list for Steigen (Tverrpolitisk liste for Steigen)	3
Total number of members:	21

Steigen kommunestyre 1995–1999
Party name (in Norwegian)	Number of representatives
Labour Party (Arbeiderpartiet)	4
Conservative Party (Høyre)	2
Christian Democratic Party (Kristelig Folkeparti)	1
Centre Party (Senterpartiet)	7
Socialist Left Party (Sosialistisk Venstreparti)	1
Liberal Party (Venstre)	1
Cross-party list (Tverrpolitisk liste)	5
Total number of members:	21

Steigen kommunestyre 1991–1995
Party name (in Norwegian)	Number of representatives
Labour Party (Arbeiderpartiet)	7
Conservative Party (Høyre)	3
Christian Democratic Party (Kristelig Folkeparti)	1
Centre Party (Senterpartiet)	7
Socialist Left Party (Sosialistisk Venstreparti)	1
Cross-party list (Tverrpolitisk list)	2
Total number of members:	21

Steigen kommunestyre 1987–1991
Party name (in Norwegian)	Number of representatives
Labour Party (Arbeiderpartiet)	10
Progress Party (Fremskrittspartiet)	1
Conservative Party (Høyre)	5
Christian Democratic Party (Kristelig Folkeparti)	2
Centre Party (Senterpartiet)	8
Socialist Left Party (Sosialistisk Venstreparti)	2
Liberal Party (Venstre)	1
Total number of members:	29

Steigen kommunestyre 1983–1987
Party name (in Norwegian)	Number of representatives
Labour Party (Arbeiderpartiet)	11
Conservative Party (Høyre)	5
Christian Democratic Party (Kristelig Folkeparti)	3
Centre Party (Senterpartiet)	7
Socialist Left Party (Sosialistisk Venstreparti)	2
Liberal Party (Venstre)	1
Total number of members:	29

Steigen kommunestyre 1979–1983
Party name (in Norwegian)	Number of representatives
Labour Party (Arbeiderpartiet)	7
Conservative Party (Høyre)	5
Christian Democratic Party (Kristelig Folkeparti)	3
Centre Party (Senterpartiet)	10
Socialist Left Party (Sosialistisk Venstreparti)	2
Liberal Party (Venstre)	2
Total number of members:	29

Steigen kommunestyre 1975–1979
Party name (in Norwegian)	Number of representatives
Labour Party (Arbeiderpartiet)	8
Christian Democratic Party (Kristelig Folkeparti)	3
Centre Party (Senterpartiet)	11
Liberal Party (Venstre)	1
Free voters non-party list (Frie velgeres upolitiske liste)	3
Fishing industry non-party list (Fiskerinæringens upolitiske liste)	3
Total number of members:	29

Steigen kommunestyre 1971–1975
Party name (in Norwegian)	Number of representatives
Labour Party (Arbeiderpartiet)	10
Conservative Party (Høyre)	2
Centre Party (Senterpartiet)	14
Liberal Party (Venstre)	3
Total number of members:	29

Steigen kommunestyre 1967–1971
Party name (in Norwegian)	Number of representatives
Labour Party (Arbeiderpartiet)	12
Conservative Party (Høyre)	3
Centre Party (Senterpartiet)	7
Liberal Party (Venstre)	2
Local List(s) (Lokale lister)	5
Total number of members:	29

Steigen kommunestyre 1963–1967
Party name (in Norwegian)	Number of representatives
Labour Party (Arbeiderpartiet)	8
Conservative Party (Høyre)	5
Christian Democratic Party (Kristelig Folkeparti)	2
Centre Party (Senterpartiet)	8
Local List(s) (Lokale lister)	6
Total number of members:	29

Steigen herredsstyre 1959–1963
Party name (in Norwegian)	Number of representatives
Labour Party (Arbeiderpartiet)	4
Christian Democratic Party (Kristelig Folkeparti)	2
Joint List(s) of Non-Socialist Parties (Borgerlige Felleslister)	11
Total number of members:	17

Steigen herredsstyre 1955–1959
Party name (in Norwegian)	Number of representatives
Labour Party (Arbeiderpartiet)	5
Christian Democratic Party (Kristelig Folkeparti)	2
Joint List(s) of Non-Socialist Parties (Borgerlige Felleslister)	5
Local List(s) (Lokale lister)	5
Total number of members:	17

Steigen herredsstyre 1951–1955
Party name (in Norwegian)	Number of representatives
Labour Party (Arbeiderpartiet)	3
Local List(s) (Lokale lister)	13
Total number of members:	16

Steigen herredsstyre 1947–1951
Party name (in Norwegian)	Number of representatives
Local List(s) (Lokale lister)	16
Total number of members:	16

Steigen herredsstyre 1945–1947
Party name (in Norwegian)	Number of representatives
Labour Party (Arbeiderpartiet)	2
Local List(s) (Lokale lister)	14
Total number of members:	16

Steigen herredsstyre 1937–1941*
Party name (in Norwegian)	Number of representatives
List of workers, fishermen, and small farmholders (Arbeidere, fiskere, småbrukere liste)	3
Joint List(s) of Non-Socialist Parties (Borgerlige Felleslister)	6
Local List(s) (Lokale lister)	7
Total number of members:	16
Note: Due to the German occupation of Norway during World War II, no elections were held for new municipal councils until after the war ended in 1945.

=== Mayors ===
The mayor (Norwegian: ordfører) of Steigen Municipality is the political leader of the municipality and the chairperson of the municipal council. Here is a list of people who have held this position:

- 1838–1839: Christian B. Stoltenberg
- 1839–1840: Hans P. Meisler
- 1840–1847: Martin Adolph Sigholt
- 1848–1851: Thomas Aagesen
- 1852–1864: Peder Hansen
- 1865–1868: Fredrik Nikolai Jensen
- 1869–1870: Thomas Aagesen
- 1871–1878: Peder Hansen
- 1878–1879: Jonas Svensen
- 1879–1880: Gerhard Schøning
- 1881–1884: Johan C.R. Wisløff
- 1885–1886: Ole Nilssen
- 1887–1892: Johan C.R. Wisløff
- 1893–1894: Lars Fremmerlid
- 1895–1896: Peter M. Kristiansen
- 1897–1901: Kristian B. Kristensen
- 1902–1913: Søren S. Svendsen
- 1914–1916: Hartvig Olsen
- 1917–1928: Søren S. Svendsen
- 1929–1931: Peder Hansen
- 1932–1937: Søren S. Svendsen
- 1938–1941: Sigurd Vik (NS)
- 1941–1945: Johan Beck (NS)
- 1945–1945: Jakob Aalstad
- 1946–1955: Gudmund Storsæther (LL)
- 1956–1959: Ludvig Fjellbakk (Ap)
- 1960–1963: Sverre Kristiansen (Ap)
- 1964–1965: Trygve Aasjord (H)
- 1966–1967: Erling J. Vindenes (V)
- 1968–1971: Johan O. Skjelstad (Ap)
- 1972–1979: Jan A. Laxaa (Sp)
- 1980–1985: Tor Johan Aalstad (Sp)
- 1985–1991: Ragnar Kildahl (Sp)
- 1991–1999: Svein Benoni (Sp)
- 1999–2003: Arne Marhaug (Ap)
- 2003–2007: Berit Woie Berg (V)
- 2007–2019: Asle Schrøder (Sp)
- 2019–present: Aase Refsnes (SV)

== Notable people ==
- Marit Elveos (born 1965 in Steigen), a cross-country skier who competed at the 1988 Winter Olympics
- Tom Erik Breive (born 1980 in Steigen), a retired football midfielder with over 100 club caps
