= Sørskot =

Village in Steigen Municipality, Norway

- Village
- Interactive map of Sørskot
- Location within Nordland Location within Norway
- Coordinates: 67.8125°N 14.7886°E
- Country: Norway
- Region: Northern Norway
- County: Nordland
- District: Salten
- Municipality: Steigen Municipality
- Elevation: 5 m (16 ft)
- Time zone: UTC+01:00 (CET)
  - Summer (DST): UTC+02:00 (CEST)
- Post Code: 8283 Leinesfjord

Sørskot is a village in Steigen Municipality in Nordland county, Norway. It is located about 2 kilometres (1.2 mi) south of the village of Nordskot and about 15 kilometres (9.3 mi) northwest of the administrative centre, Leinesfjorden. Sørskot Chapel was built here in 1953.
