= Leiranger Church =

Church in Nordland, Norway

- Leiranger kirke
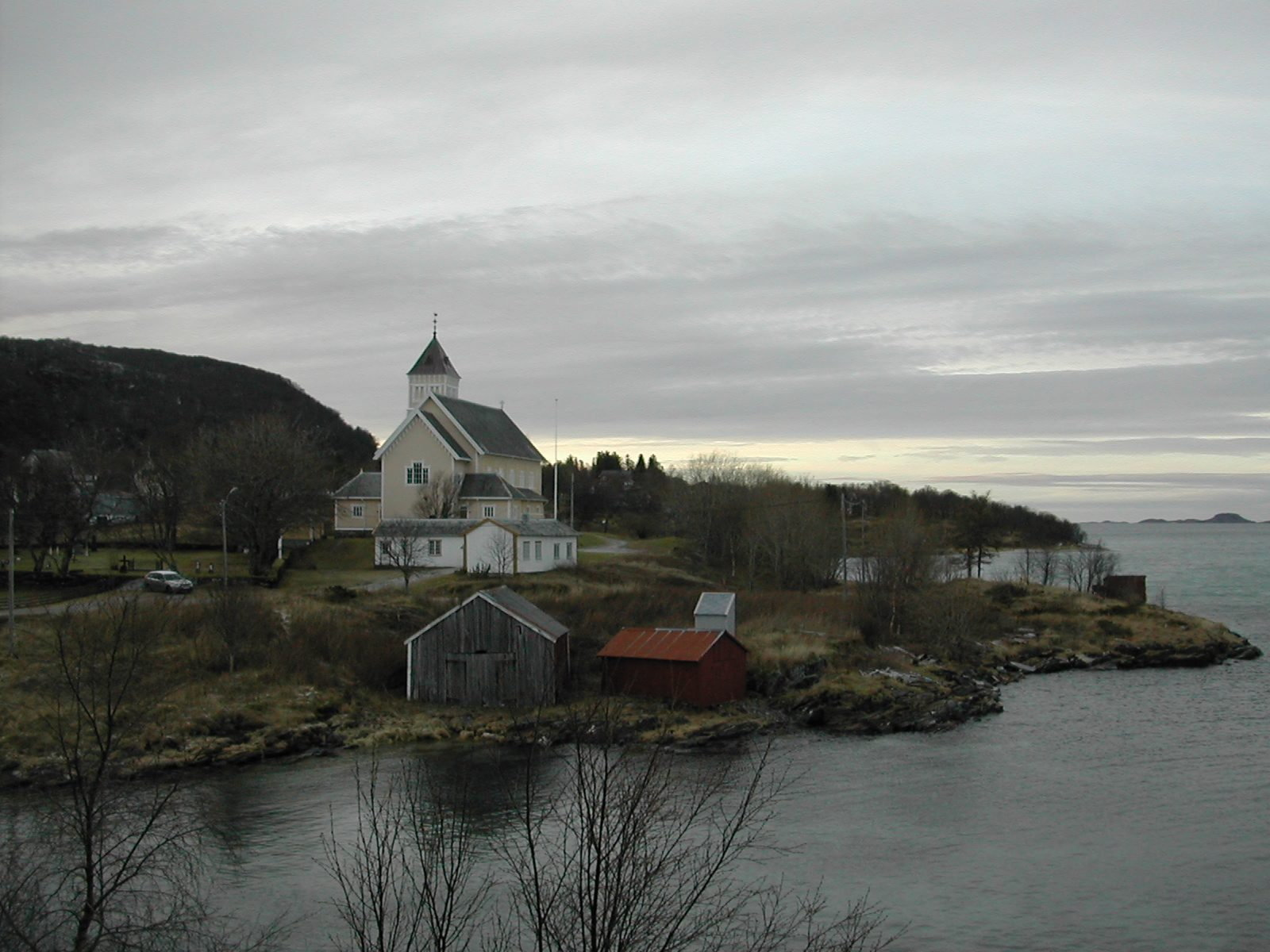
- View of the church
- Leiranger Church
- 67.73824842°N 14.8064348°E
- Location: Steigen Municipality, Nordland
- Country: Norway
- Denomination: Church of Norway
- Churchmanship: Evangelical Lutheran

History
- Status: Parish church
- Founded: 16th century
- Consecrated: 1911

Architecture
- Functional status: Active
- Architect: Nils Ryjord
- Architectural type: Long church
- Completed: 1911 (115 years ago)

Specifications
- Capacity: 500
- Materials: Wood

Administration
- Diocese: Sør-Hålogaland
- Deanery: Salten prosti
- Parish: Leiranger
- Norwegian Cultural Heritage Site
- Type: Church
- Status: Listed
- ID: 84280

Leiranger Church (Norwegian: Leiranger kirke) is a parish church of the Church of Norway in Steigen Municipality in Nordland county, Norway. It is located in the village of Leines. It is the main church for the Leiranger parish which is part of the Salten prosti (deanery) in the Diocese of Sør-Hålogaland. The yellow, wooden church was built in a long church style in 1911 by the architect Nils Ryjord. The church seats about 500 people.

== History ==
The earliest existing historical records of this church date back to 1589, but it had been built some time before then. One of the existing church bells has the date 1523, so this could be the year of the church's founding. In 1690, the church was described as a small wooden church with a small choir and sacristy. As the church aged, it was no longer in good condition. In 1721, the choir was rebuilt. In 1734, the old church was torn down and replaced with a new church on the same site. The new building was a log cruciform design with no tower or steeple. In December 1795, this church burned down after a lightning bolt hit the church and started a fire. A new church was finished in 1801, located on a higher plateau, just to the northwest of the graveyard which surrounded the old church. This timber-framed church was also a cruciform design. In 1909, the church burned again, from another lightning strike. The present church was completed in 1911.

== See also ==
- List of churches in Sør-Hålogaland
