= Leinesfjord Chapel =

Church in Nordland, Norway

- Leinesfjord kapell
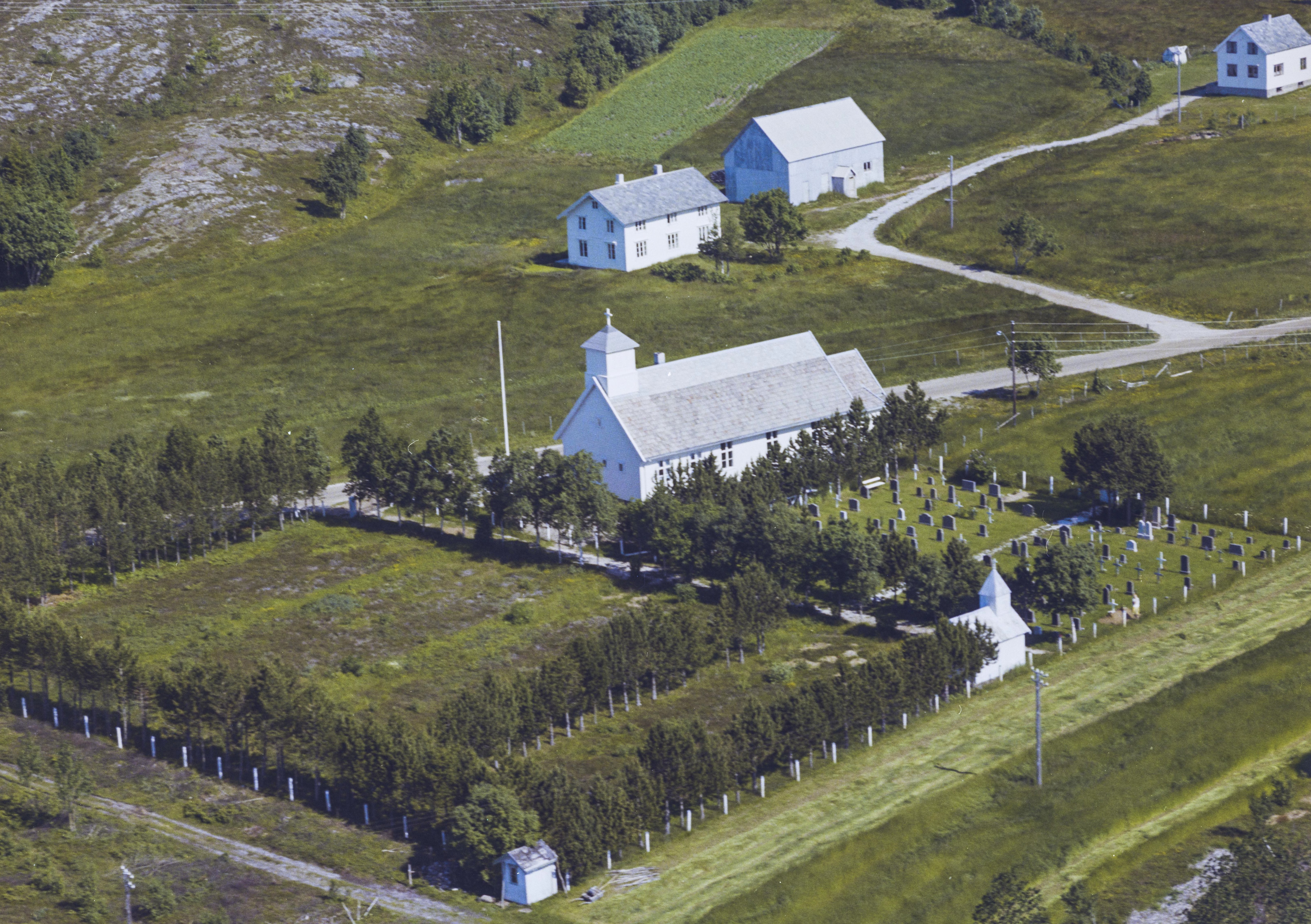
- View of the chapel
- Leinesfjord Chapel
- 67.772894°N 15.0356389°E
- Location: Steigen Municipality, Nordland
- Country: Norway
- Denomination: Church of Norway
- Churchmanship: Evangelical Lutheran

History
- Status: Chapel
- Founded: 1912
- Consecrated: 26 May 1963

Architecture
- Functional status: Active
- Architect(s): Hans Willumsen, Odd Møland, and Weugel Knudsen
- Architectural type: Long church
- Completed: 1912 (114 years ago)

Specifications
- Capacity: 150
- Materials: Wood

Administration
- Diocese: Sør-Hålogaland
- Deanery: Salten prosti
- Parish: Leiranger
- Norwegian Cultural Heritage Site
- Type: Church
- Status: Not protected
- ID: 84278

Leinesfjord Chapel (Norwegian: Leinesfjord kapell) is a chapel of the Church of Norway in Steigen Municipality in Nordland county, Norway. It is located in the village of Leinesfjorden. It is an annex chapel in the Leiranger parish which is part of the Salten prosti (deanery) in the Diocese of Sør-Hålogaland. The white, wooden chapel was built in a long church style in 1912 using plans drawn up by the architects Hans Willumsen, Odd Møland, and Weugel Knudsen. The chapel seats about 150 people. It was originally built as a bedehuskapell, but on 26 May 1963, the building was "upgraded" to a full chapel when it was consecrated by the Bishop Hans Edvard Wisløff. Steigen Municipality owned and operated the chapel until 2004 when the parish congregation took over.

== See also ==
- List of churches in Sør-Hålogaland
