= Engeløya =

Island in Steigen, Norway

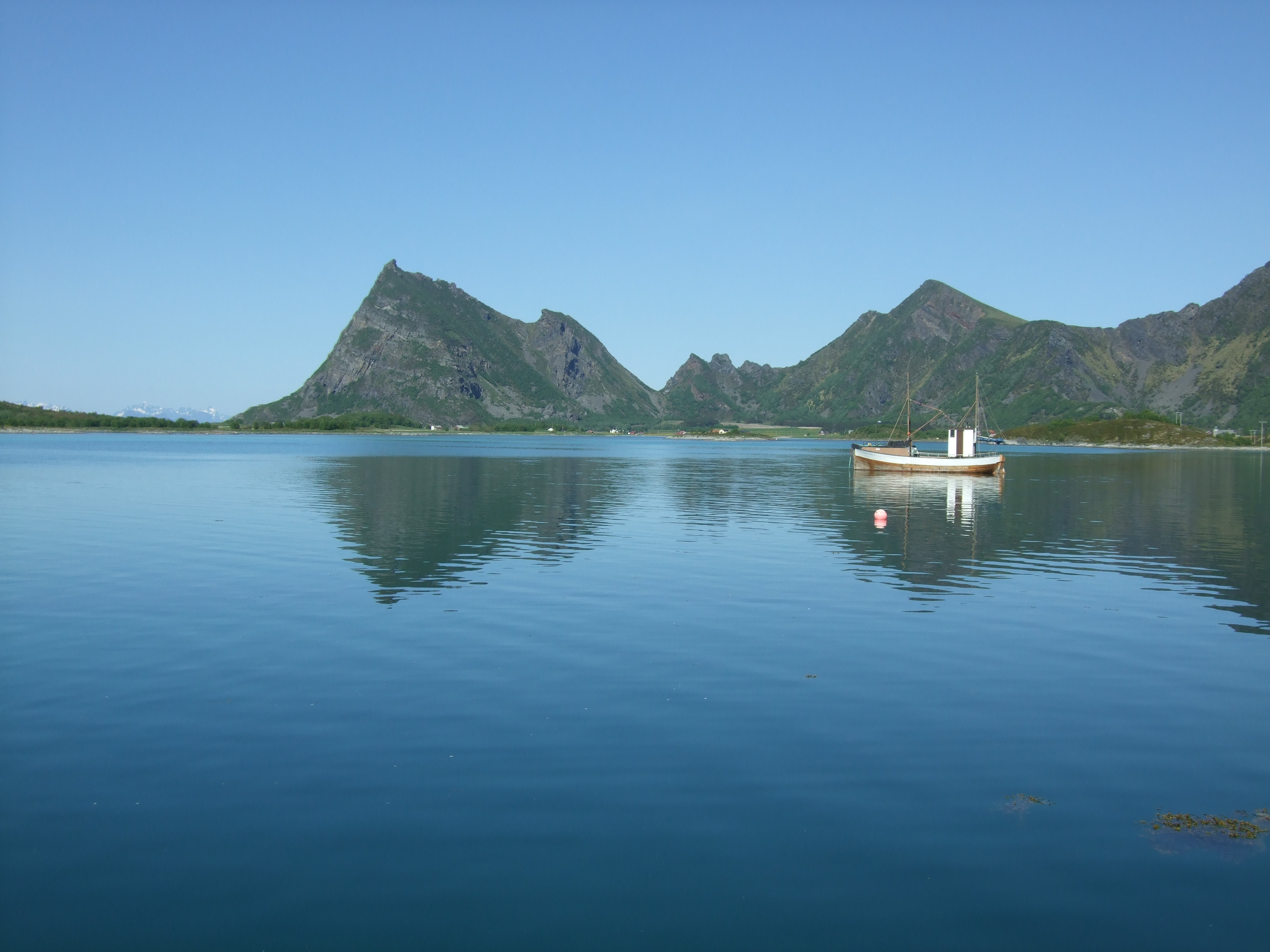
- The western mountains of Engeløya, known as "Napoleons profile"
- Interactive map of Engeløya

Geography
- Location: Nordland, Norway
- Coordinates: 67.9490°N 15.0003°E
- Area: 69 km^{2} (27 sq mi)
- Length: 15.6 km (9.69 mi)
- Width: 9.6 km (5.97 mi)
- Highest elevation: 649 m (2129 ft)
- Highest point: Trohornet

Administration
- Norway
- County: Nordland
- Municipality: Steigen Municipality

Demographics
- Population: 615 (2016)

Engeløya is an island in the northern part of Steigen Municipality in Nordland county, Norway. The island has an area of 69 square kilometres (27 sq mi). The highest point on the island is the 649-metre (2,129 ft) Trohornet mountain. The rocky, mountainous island has grassy slopes that are fertile and it has some of the better farmland in the municipality. The island sits in the entrance to the Sagfjorden, just south of the island of Lundøya.

Engeløya is connected to the mainland by the Engeløy Bridges. The Engeløy Airport, Grådussan is located on the northwestern tip of the island. Steigen Church is located on the southwestern side of the island.

The name Engeløya translates as "Angel Island" in the English language.

During WWII, the German Battery Dietl was constructed with three 40.6 cm SK C/34 guns as part of the Atlantic Wall.

== Gallery ==
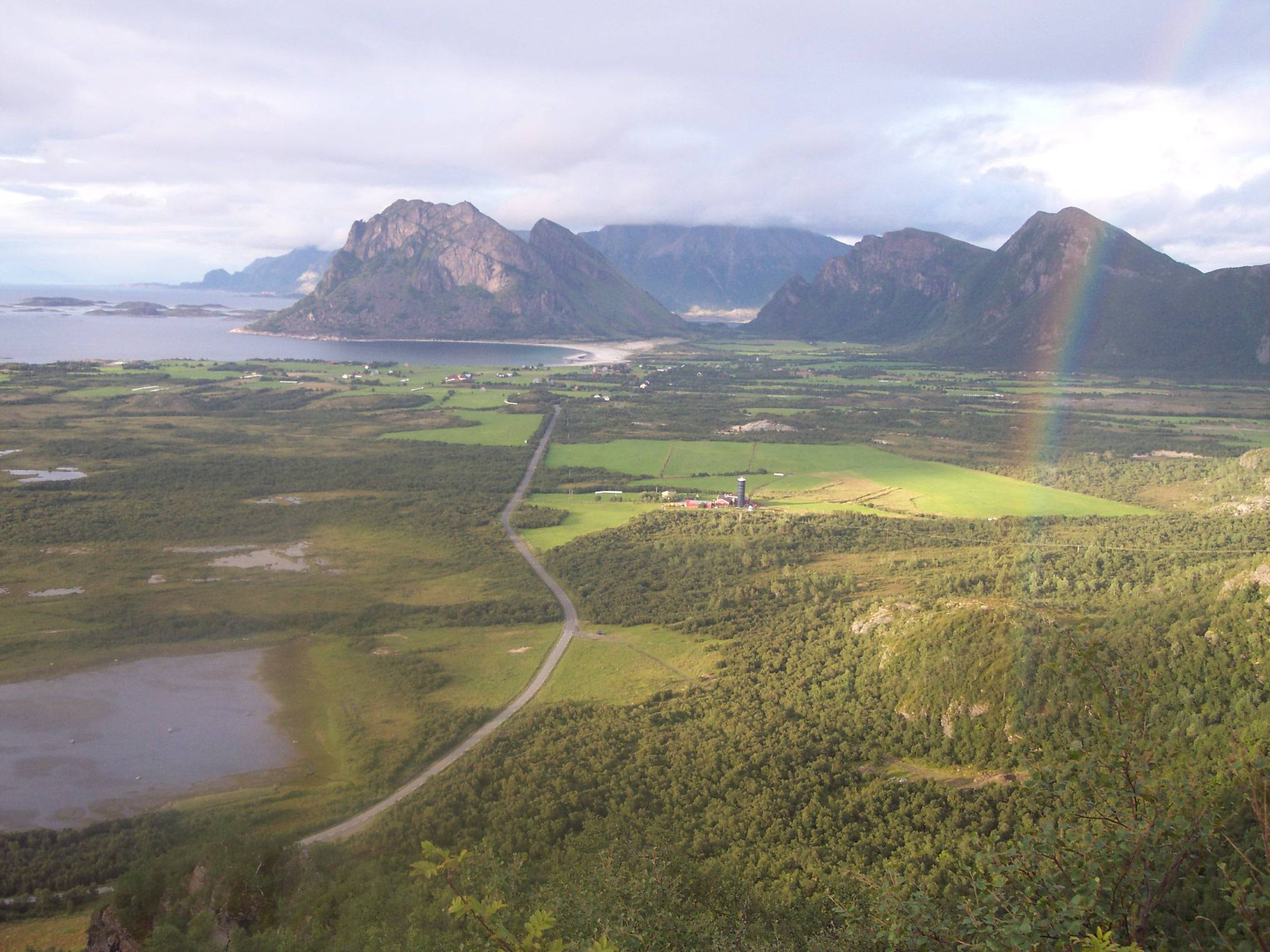
Overlooking forestry and farmland on Engeløya

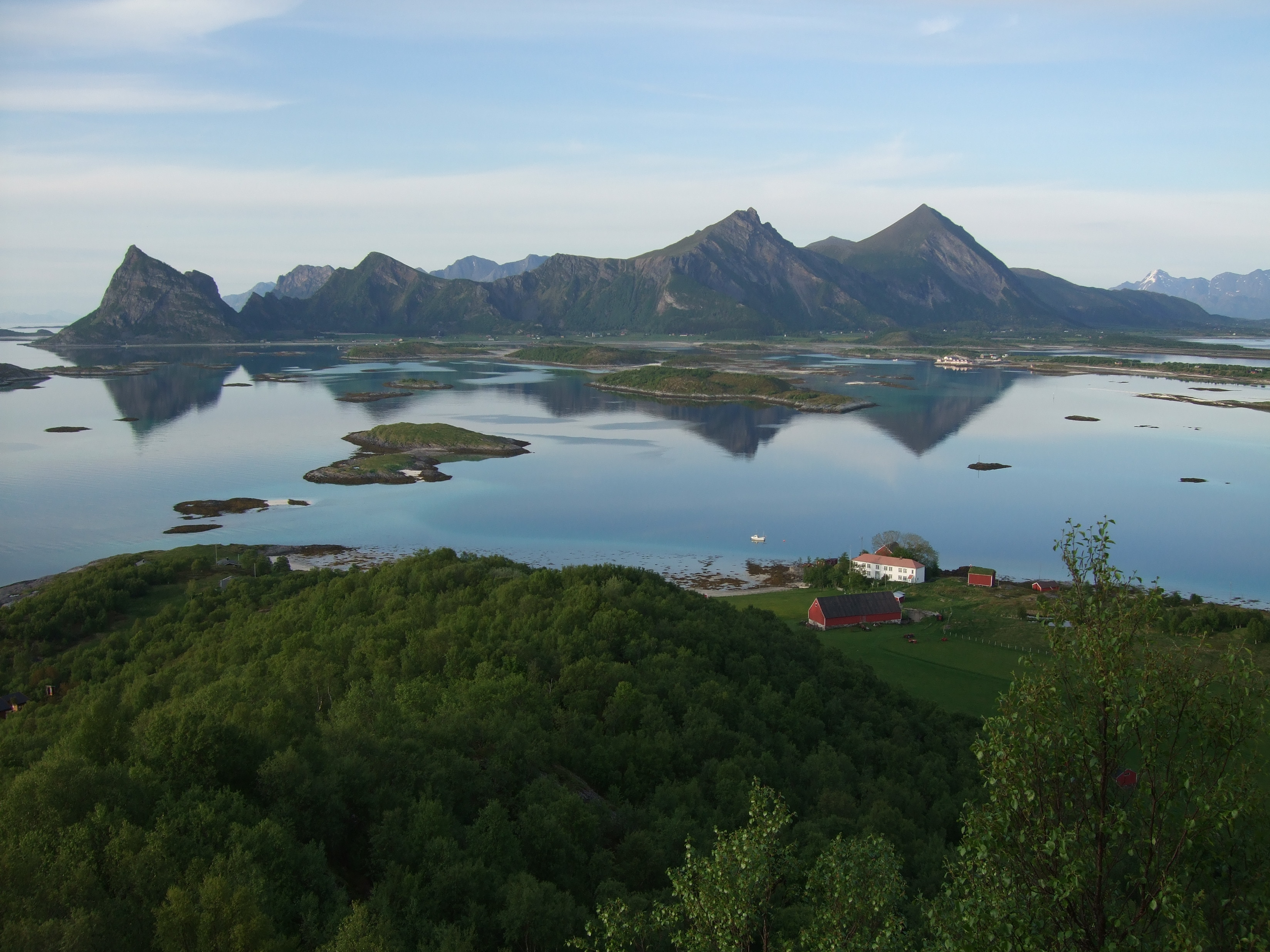
Engeløya in background

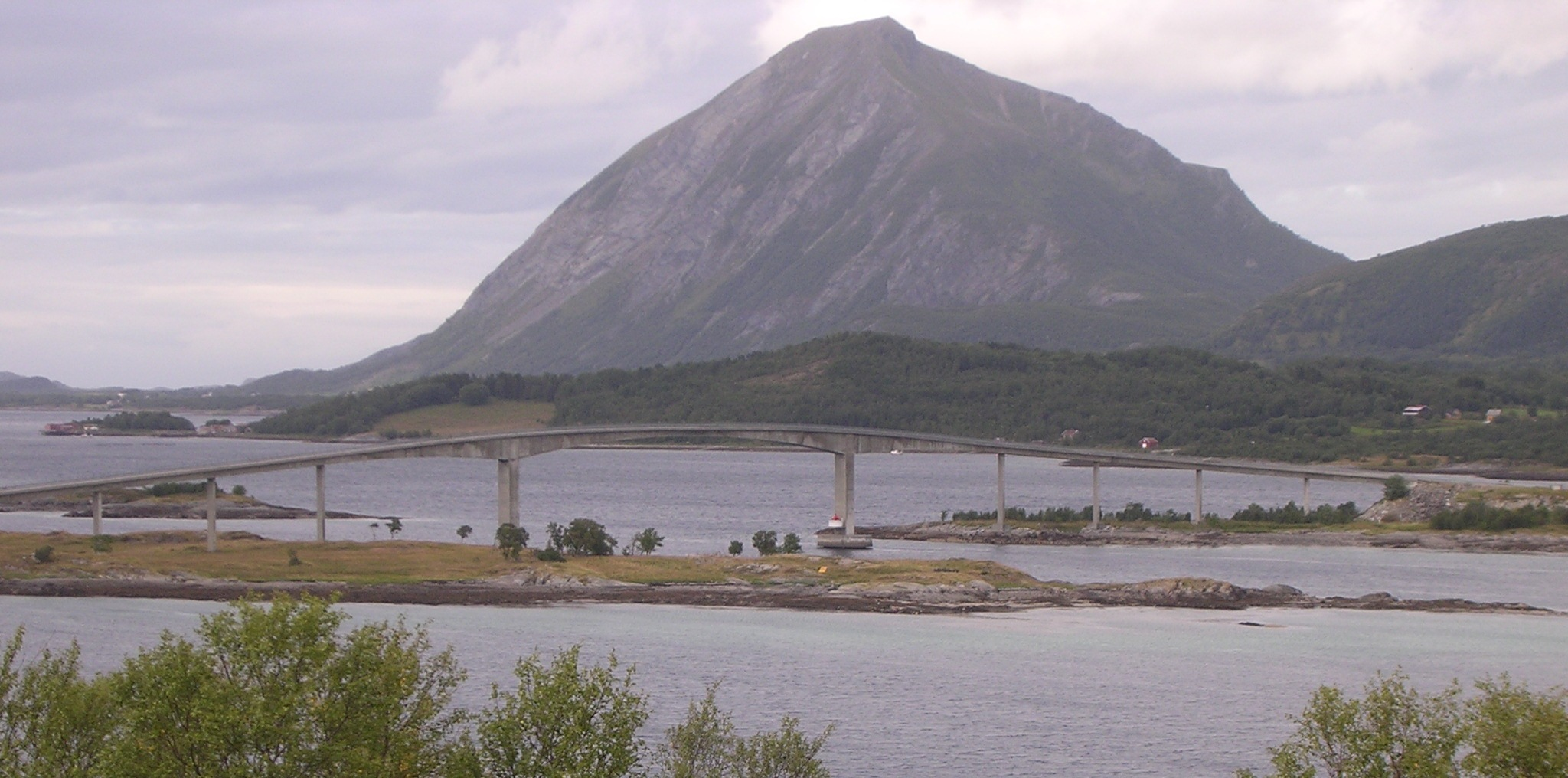
View of the Engeløya bridge

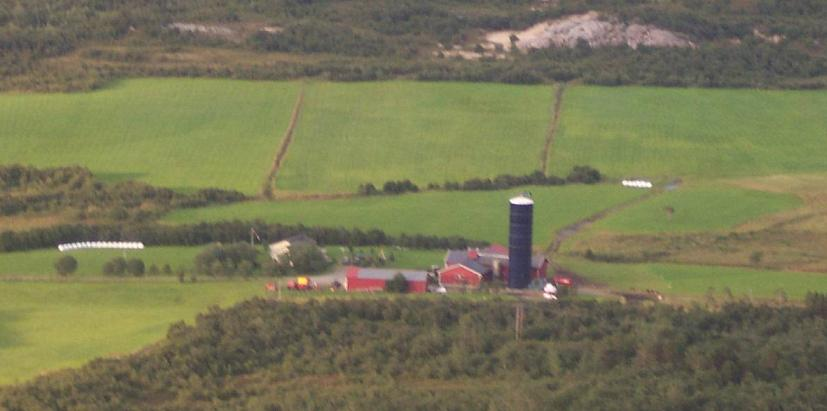
Farm on Engeløya

== See also ==
- List of islands of Norway
- Trondenes Fort, the four gun Battery Theo of WWII
