= Nordfold =

Village in Steigen Municipality, Norway

- Village
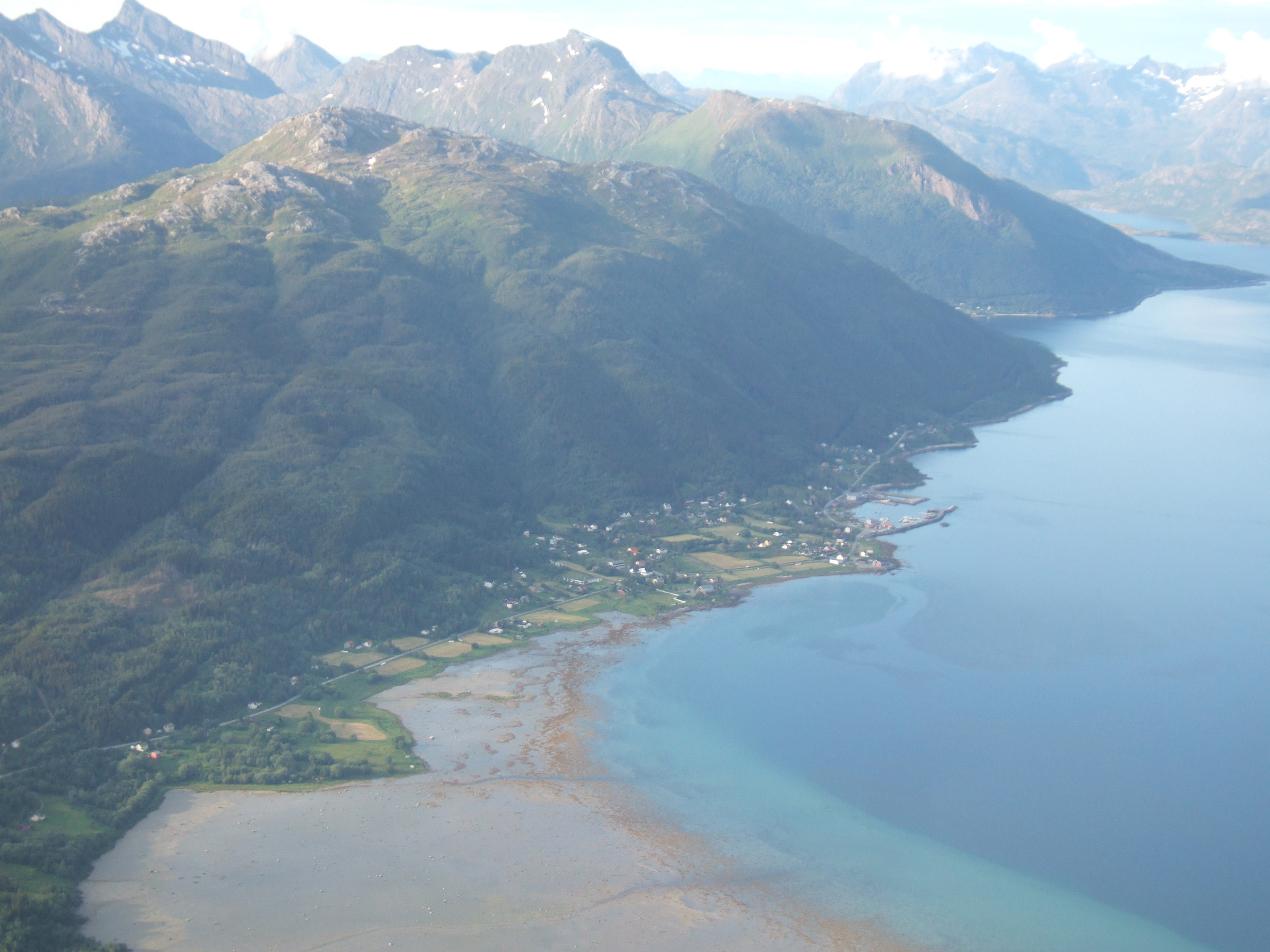
- View of the village
- Interactive map of Nordfold
- Location within Nordland Location within Norway
- Coordinates: 67.7623°N 15.2302°E
- Country: Norway
- Region: Northern Norway
- County: Nordland
- District: Salten
- Municipality: Steigen Municipality
- Elevation: 5 m (16 ft)
- Time zone: UTC+01:00 (CET)
  - Summer (DST): UTC+02:00 (CEST)
- Post Code: 8286 Nordfold

Nordfold is a village in Steigen Municipality in Nordland county, Norway. The village of Nordfold lies along the Nordfolda, a northern branch of the main Folda fjord. The village lies about 15 kilometres (9.3 mi) east of the municipal centre of Leinesfjorden. Nordfold is the location of the Nordfold Church.

== History ==
The village was the administrative centre of the old Nordfold Municipality which existed from 1906 until 1964. Prior to the opening of the Steigen Tunnel in 1990, there was no road access to the municipality and Nordfold was the ferry quay for the regular ferry routes connecting Steigen to the rest of the country.
