= Leinesfjorden =

Village in Steigen Municipality, Norway

Leinesfjorden Myklebostad
- Village
- Interactive map of Leinesfjorden; Myklebostad
- Location within Nordland Location within Norway
- Coordinates: 67.7746°N 15.0161°E
- Country: Norway
- Region: Northern Norway
- County: Nordland
- District: Salten
- Municipality: Steigen Municipality

Area
  - Total: 0.27 km^{2} (0.10 sq mi)
- Elevation: 7 m (23 ft)

Population (2023)
  - Total: 251
  - Density: 930/km^{2} (2,400/sq mi)
- Time zone: UTC+01:00 (CET)
  - Summer (DST): UTC+02:00 (CEST)
- Post Code: 8283 Leinesfjord

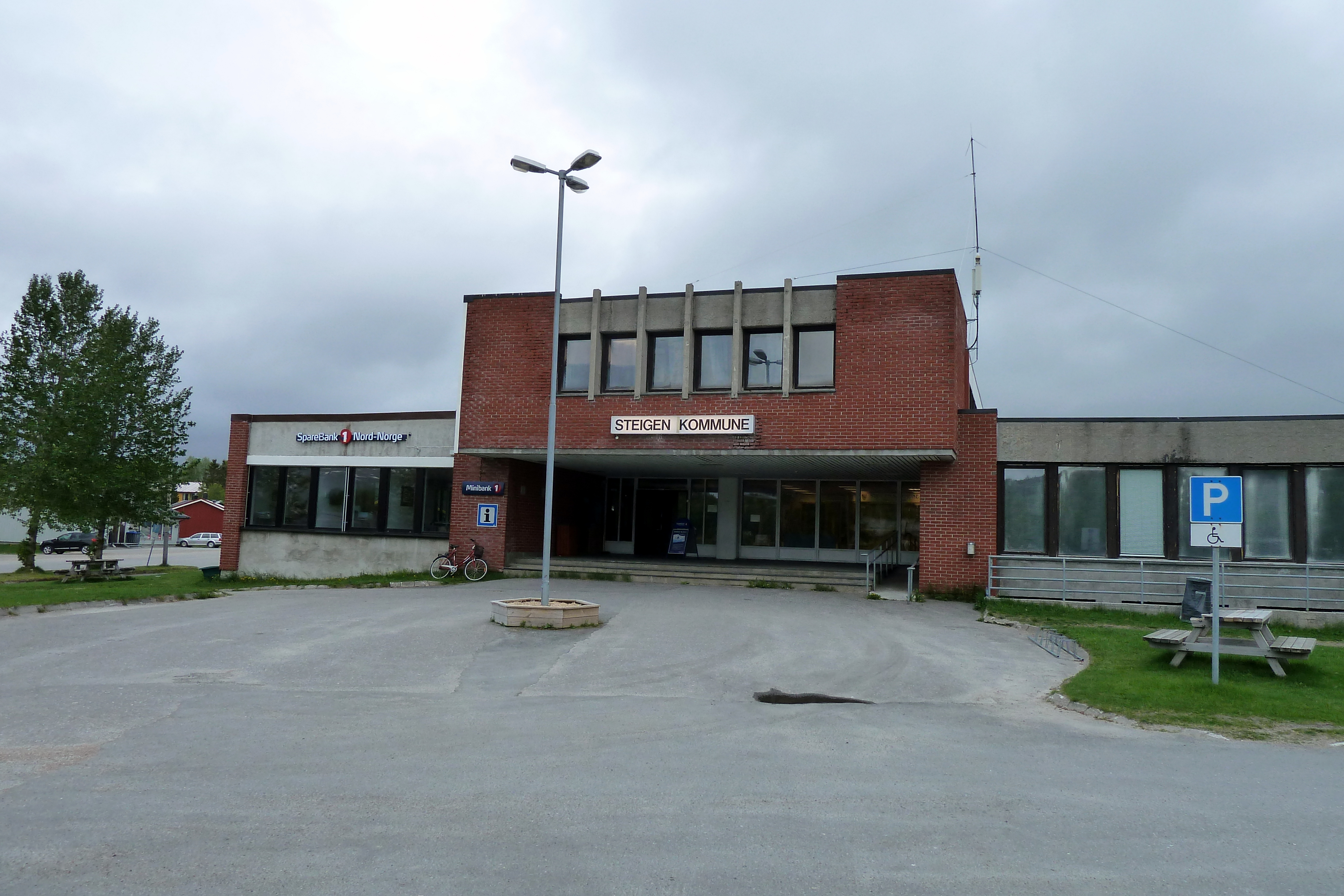
Steigen municipality's administration building in Leinesfjord.

Leinesfjorden or Myklebostad is the administrative centre of Steigen Municipality in Nordland county, Norway. The village is located about 10 kilometres (6.2 mi) west of the village of Nordfold along the Leinesfjorden, the fjord after which the village is named. The local school is located here as well as Leinesfjord Chapel.

The 0.27-square-kilometre (67-acre) village has a population (2023) of 251 and a population density of 930 inhabitants per square kilometre (2,400/sq mi).
