= Kjerringøy trading post =

Museum in Nordland, Norway

Coordinates: 67°31′09″N 14°45′14″E

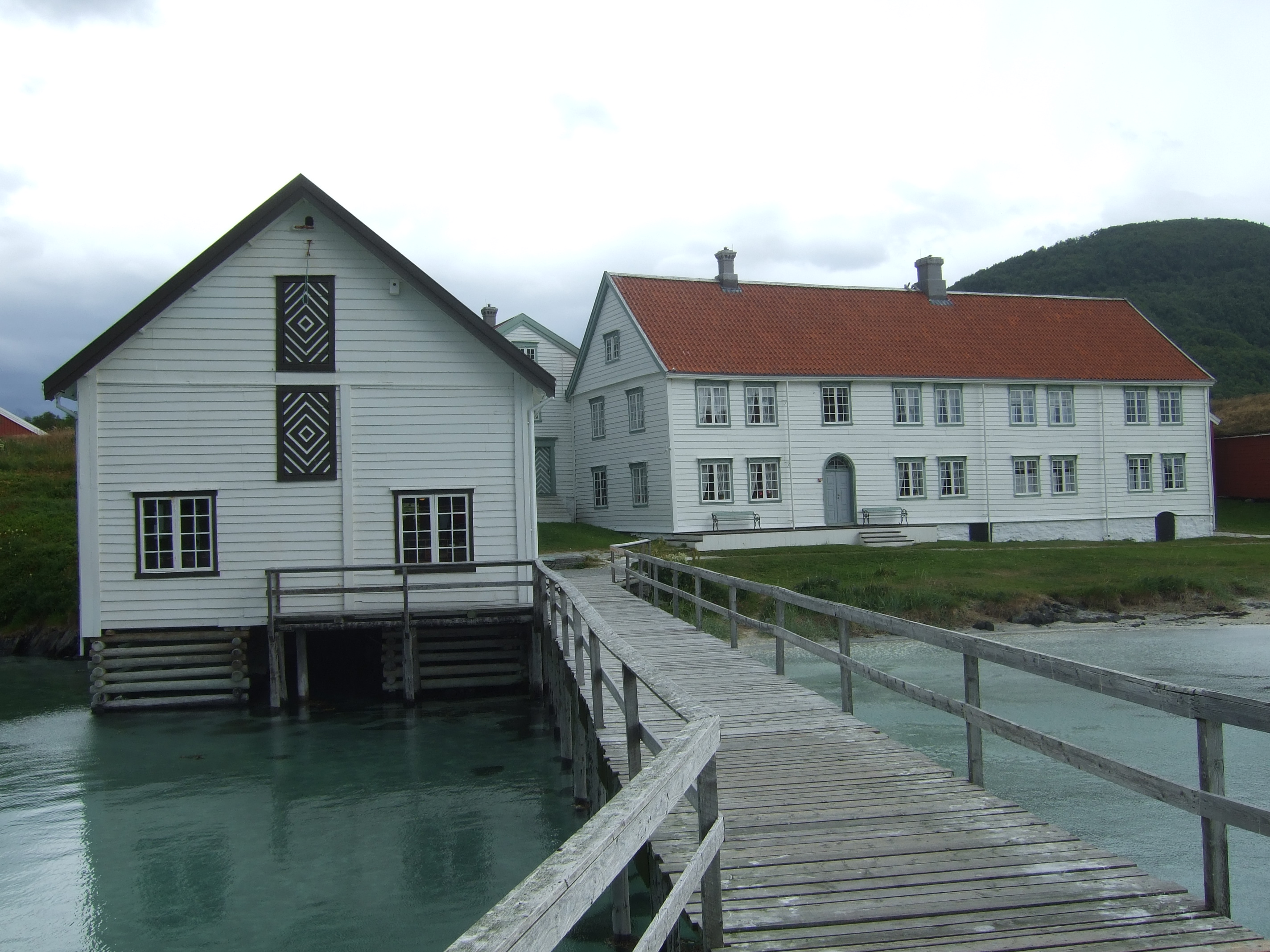
Kjerringøy trading post

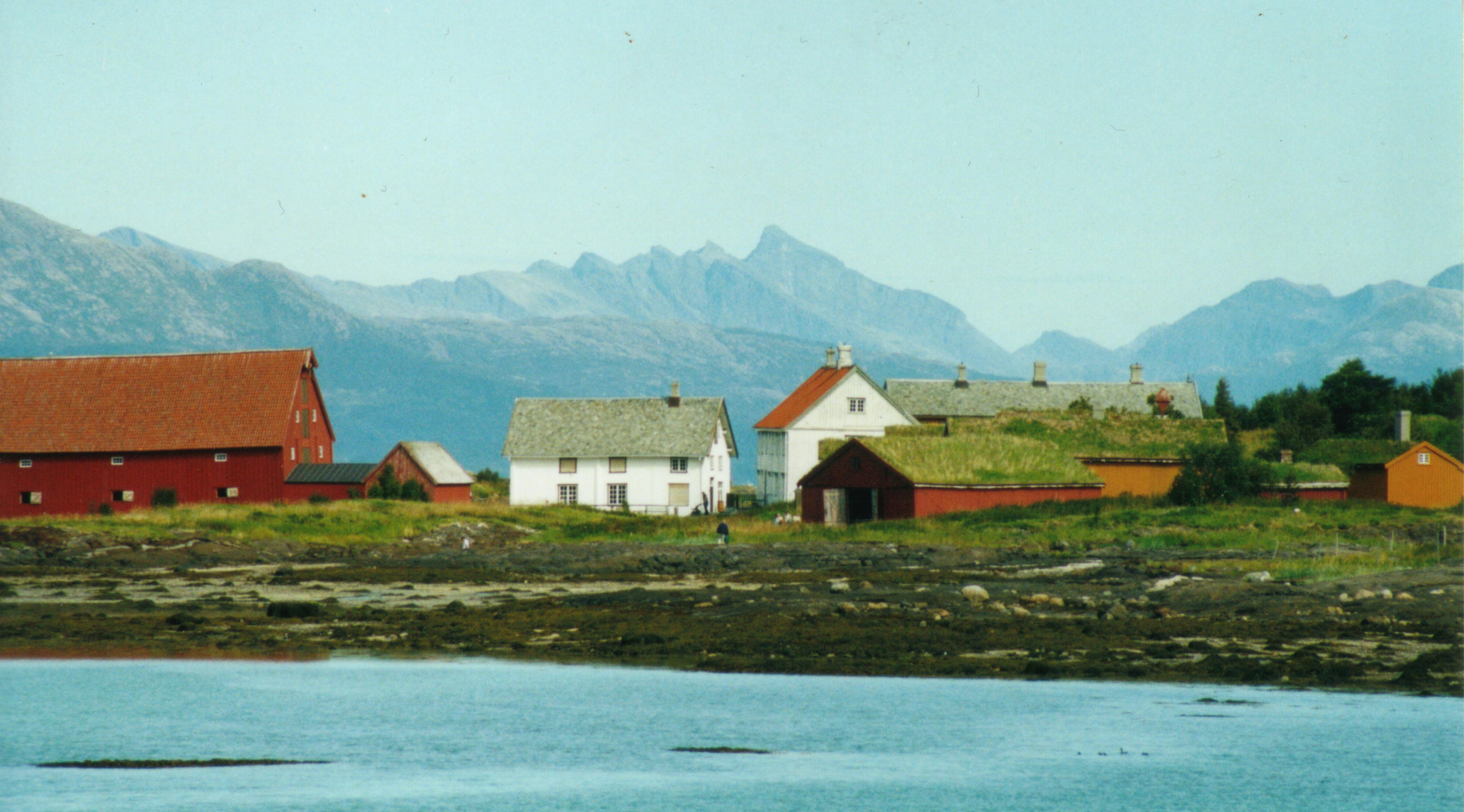
Distant view of Kjerringøy trading post

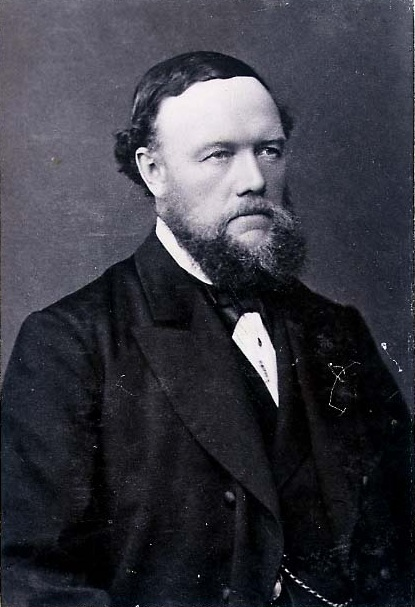
Erasmus Zahl (1826-1900)

Kjerringøy trading post (Kjerringøy handelssted) is an open-air museum at Kjerringøy in Nordland, Norway. It is operated as part of the Nordland Museum of cultural history.

== History ==
Kjerringøy trading post was established in the late 1700s. It traded over a large area, and was licensed to provide accommodation for travelers. Through the buying and selling of fish and fish products it gradually became an affluent trading post. The Kjerringøy merchants bought fish in Lofoten and elsewhere in Nordland, dried or salted the fish and sold it in Bergen and other places. The ships used to transport the goods where often single masted open cargo sailing ships, such as the Anna Karoline. The ships returned with foodstuffs, fishing gear and other equipment, which they sold in their local store, or in the Lofoten islands.

The business remained quite modest until about 1820 when a boom began, led by good prices for fish. The herring fishery experienced a peak from about 1860. The merchant post's business was at the height of its prosperity around 1875, after which it slowly declined. The merchant at the time invested in mining, industry and other modern enterprises, mostly with little success.

== Merchants ==
The first merchant of note on Kjerringøy was Christian Lorentzen Sverdrup who owned the business from 1803 until his death in 1829. He had earlier traded at Hundholmen in Bodø. It was under his ownership that the boom came to Kjerringøy. Sverdrup's daughter, Anna Elisabeth, married Jens Nicolai Ellingssen. He took over the business and invested in the fish trade with great success. Ellingsen died in 1849. His widow continued the business with increasing help from her young clerk, Erasmus Zahl. They got married in 1859 and Zahl's rise coincided with Kjerringøy's heyday. Zahl amassed exceptional riches and stamped his mark on the business life of Nordland for several decades.

Anna Elisabeth died in 1879, and Zahl in 1900. When he died, the Kjerringøy business and its earning power had been declining for a couple of decades, as was true for most of the other northern Norwegian merchant posts. Local merchant, farmer and politician Gerhard Kristiansen (1868-1937) took over the business and ran it from 1900 until his death in 1937. During his time, it became a purely local.

== Nordland Museum ==
The commercial operation of Kjerringøy trading post was discontinued at the end of the 1950s and the premises were bought by Nordland Museum in 1959. There had been little or no activity there for many years and the buildings had become dilapidated. Most of the buildings at the museum now have been fully restored. Today the museum comprises 15 buildings and functions as an open-air museum.

== See also ==
- Zahl (Norwegian family)

== Other sources ==
- Haar, Karl Erik (1986) Sirilund: Vandringer pa Kjerringøy gamle handelssted (Oslo: Cappelen) ISBN 978-8202105884

== Related Reading ==
- Fulsås, Narve, "Voksteren og fallet til ein nordlandsk handelsstad. Kjerringøy i K. Zahl si tid 1850-1900". Hovedoppgave i historie, Universitetet i Tromsø, 1983.
- Karlsen, Aasta, "Kjerringøy Gamle Handelssted: Guidehåndbok". Nordlandsmuseet, 2003.
- Kusch, Heinz, Medaljongtapet fra Kjerringøy Gamle Handelssted: Historikk; konserveringsbehov; Restaureringsalternativer". Nordland Fylkeskommune, 2004.
- Vreim, Halvor, Kjerringøy handelssted fra bokhylla.no.
- Bugge, Astrid, Ryer og underskjørt fra Kjerringøy fra bokhylla.no.
