= Nordfold-Kjerringøy Municipality =

Former municipality in Nordland, Norway

Nordfold-Kjerringøy Municipality Nordfold-Kjerringøy herred
- Former municipality
- Nordfolden og Kjerringø herred (historic name); Nordfolden–Kjerringø herred (historic name)
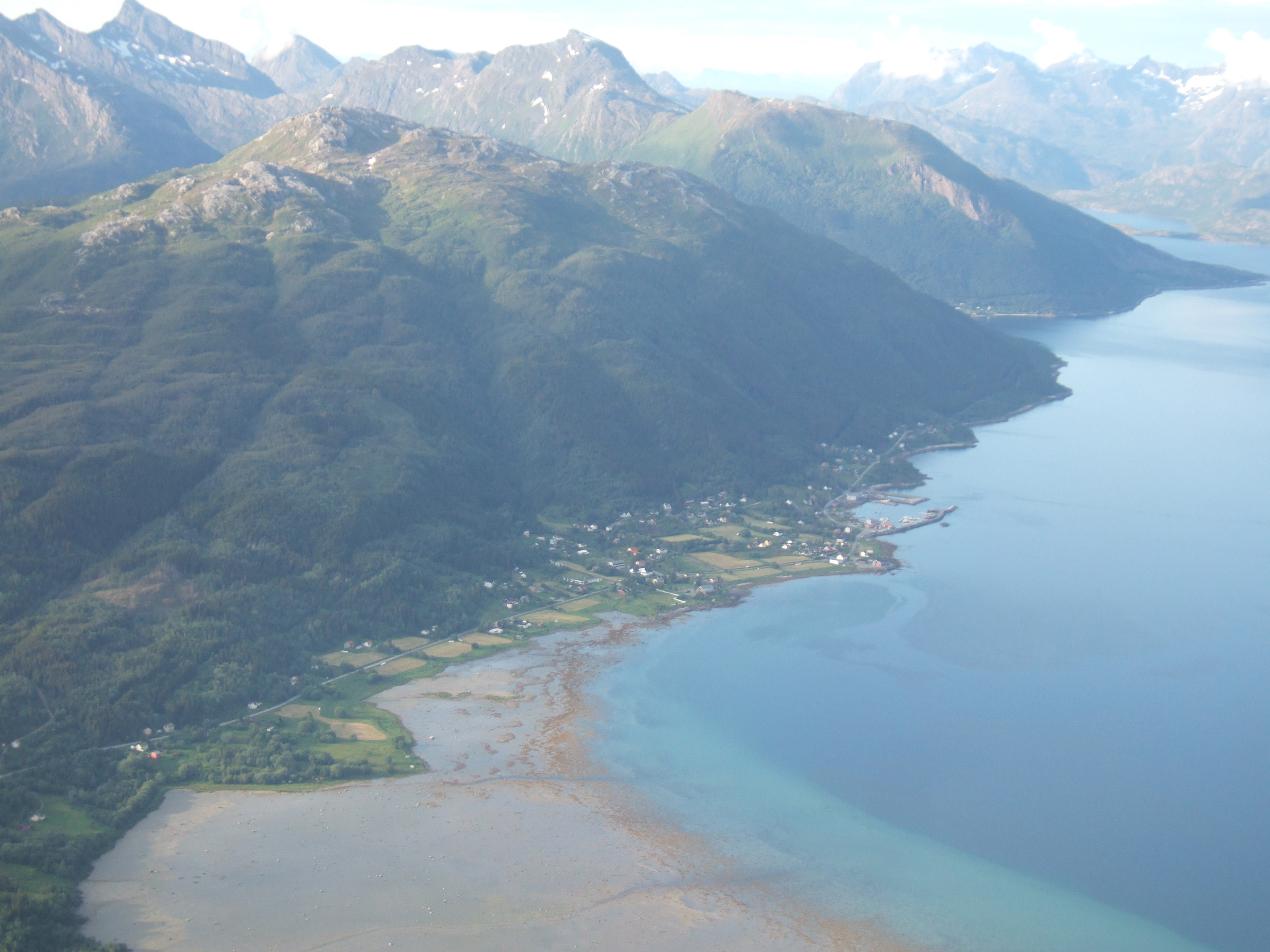
- View of Nordfold

- Nordland within Norway

- Nordfold-Kjerringøy within Nordland
- Coordinates: 67°45′48″N 15°13′58″E
- Country: Norway
- County: Nordland
- District: Salten
- Established: 1 Jan 1887
  - Preceded by: Folden Municipality
- Disestablished: 1 Jan 1906
  - Succeeded by: Nordfold Municipality and Kjerringøy Municipality

Area (upon dissolution)
  - Total: 737 km^{2} (285 sq mi)
- Highest elevation: 1,351.15 m (4,432.9 ft)

Population (1906)
  - Total: 2,342
  - Density: 3.2/km^{2} (8.3/sq mi)
- Demonym(s): Nordfoldværing; Kjerringøyværing
- Time zone: UTC+01:00 (CET)
  - Summer (DST): UTC+02:00 (CEST)
- ISO 3166 code: NO-1846

Nordfold-Kjerringøy or Nordfold og Kjerringøy (historically spelled Nordfolden-Kjerringø or Nordfolden og Kjerringø) is a former municipality in Nordland county, Norway. The 737-square-kilometre (285 sq mi) municipality existed from 1887 until its dissolution in 1906. The municipality covered the area surrounding the entrance to the large Folda fjord plus the area surrounding the northern branch of that fjord. It included the southern part of what is now Steigen Municipality, the northern part of the present-day Bodø Municipality, and the northern part of what is now Sørfold Municipality.

Prior to its dissolution in 1906, the 737-square-kilometre (285 sq mi) municipality had a population of about 2,342. The municipality's population density was 3.2 inhabitants per square kilometre (8.3/sq mi).

== General information ==
The municipality of Nordfolden-Kjerringø was established on 1 January 1887, when the large Folden Municipality was split into two new municipalities: Nordfolden-Kjerringø Municipality (population: 1,347) and Sørfold Municipality (population: 1,946). On 1 January 1894, the Movik farm (population: 30) on the north side of the Sagfjorden was moved administratively from Nordfolden-Kjerringø Municipality to the neighboring Sørfold Municipality. On 1 January 1906, Nordfolden-Kjerringø Municipality ceased to exist when it was split into two new municipalities: Nordfold Municipality (population: 1,485) and Kjerringøy Municipality (population: 857).

=== Name ===
The municipality was created in 1887 and it was given a compound name made up of the two areas that made up the municipality: Nordfolden and Kjerringø. Using current Norwegian spellings, the name would be Nordfold-Kjerringøy, but the municipal name was never spelled that way during its existence. It was always spelled as Nordfolden-Kjerringø or Nordfolden og Kjerringø during its existence.

The first part is named after the local Folda fjord (Old Norse: Fold). The first element is the prefix nord which means "northern". The last element is the definite form of fold which has an unknown meaning (maybe "the broad one"). The inner part of the fjord is divided into two arms Nordfolda ("the northern Folda") and Sørfolda ("the southern Folda").

The second part is named after the old Kjerringøy farm (Old Norse: Kerlingarøy) since the first Kjerringøy Church was built there. The first element is the genitive case of kerling which means "of the old woman", probably meaning that the land was once owned by a widow. The last element is øy which means "island".

=== Churches ===
The Church of Norway had one parish (sokn) within Nordfolden-KjerringøF Municipality. At the time of the municipal dissolution, it was part of the Folda prestegjeld and the Bodø prosti (deanery) in the Diocese of Sør-Hålogaland.

Churches in Nordfolden-Kjerringø Municipality
Parish (sokn)	Church name	Location of the church	Year built
Nordfolden	Nordfold Church	Nordfold	1884*
Kjerringø	Kjerringøy Church	Kjerringøy	1883
*Note: Nordfold Church burned down in 1973 and was rebuilt in 1975.

== Geography ==
The municipality included all the area around the Nordfolda and the entrance to the Folda fjord. To the west was Ledingen Municipality, to the northwest was Steigen Municipality, to the northeast was Hamarøy Municipality, to the east was Sørfold Municipality, and to the south was Bodin Municipality. The highest point in the municipality was the 1,351.15-metre (4,432.9 ft) tall mountain Helldalisen.

== Government ==
While it existed, Nordfolden-Kjerringø Municipality was responsible for primary education (through 10th grade), outpatient health services, senior citizen services, welfare and other social services, zoning, economic development, and municipal roads and utilities. The municipality was governed by a municipal council of directly elected representatives. The mayor was indirectly elected by a vote of the municipal council. Hålogaland Court of Appeal.

=== Mayors ===
The mayor (Norwegian: ordfører) of Nordfolden-Kjerringø Municipality was the political leader of the municipality and the chairperson of the municipal council. Here is a list of people who held this position:

- 1887–1892: Ernst Kristian Gladsjø
- 1893–1898: Peter Gylseth
- 1899–1904: Peder Nilssen-Fjære
- 1905–1905: Peter Gylseth

== See also ==
- List of former municipalities of Norway
