= Zahle (disambiguation) =

Zahle may refer to:

- Zahle (surname)
- Zahlé (transliterated Zahleh or Zahleh, زحلة), the capital of Beqaa Governorate, Lebanon
- Zahle and Forzol, a Melkite Catholic diocese in the Beqaa Valley, Lebanon
- Our Lady of Zahle and the Bekaa, a Marian shrine
- Centre d'Etudes Universitaires de Zahlé et de la Békaa (CEUZB), a university institution
- Anibal Zahle, a Lebanese sports club
- Zahle District

== See also ==
- Zahl (disambiguation)
