= Nordland families =

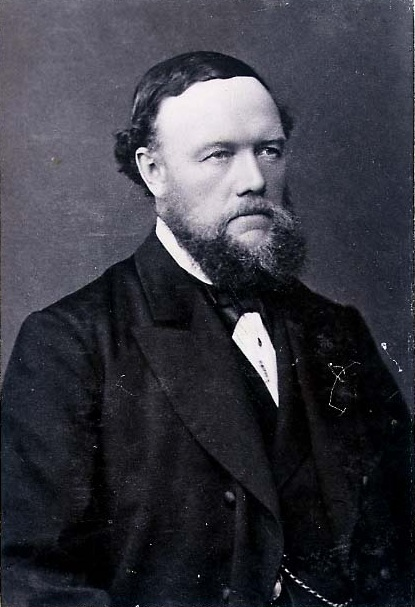
Trader and island owner Erasmus B.K. Zahl was a typical representative of the Nordland families. As such he is known through Knut Hamsun's famous character Mack. Photograph: Mr Finne

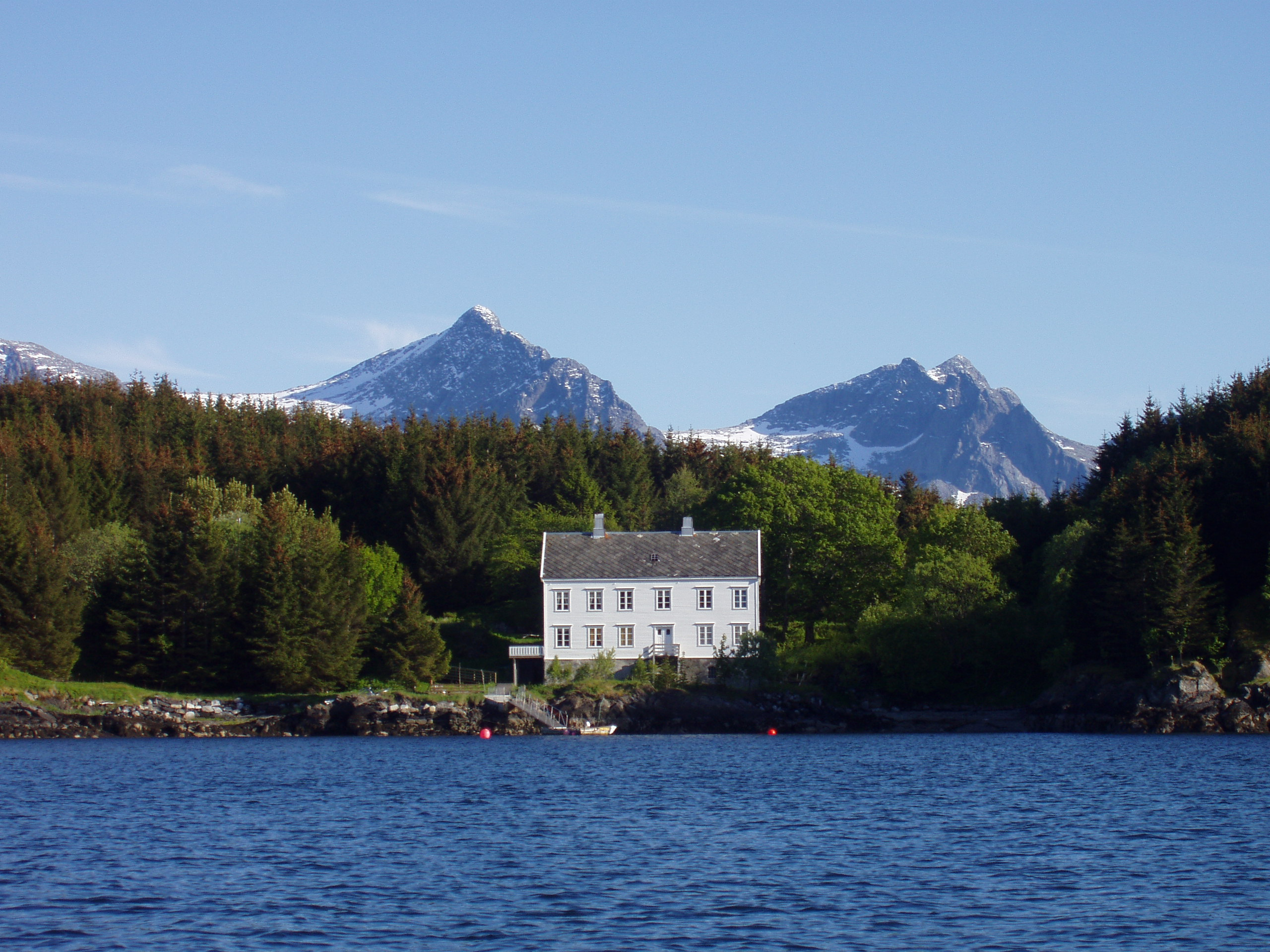
Nordland families are often associated with the region's several trade seats. One is Lauvøya, which has been possessed by, among others, the Jentoft family and the Hveding family. Photograph: Commons user Knut

Nordland families (Norwegian: nordlandsslekt) are the older families of burgher or clerical estate in today's counties of Nordland and Troms, plus Finnmark, in Norway. These families belonged to the leading social classes of Northern Norway.

== Characteristics ==
Some basic characteristics of a Nordland family are that they were socially established since the centuries before 1800, that they lived on the countryside, where they had typical burgher culture and professions, that they married each other, that they bore permanent family names, something that very few people had (ordinary people used patronyms), and that they often had roots outside Norway, mostly in Denmark and the Duchies.

Many Nordland families are, in some cases extensively, described in written pieces especially of the 18th and the 19th century. Among these are travel journals by Gustav Peter Blom, the Swedes Johan Erik Forsström, Sven Nilsson, and J.W. Zetterstedt, the German Leopold von Buch, and the Englishmen Sir Arthur de Capell Brooke and Frederick Metcalfe. These families' culture, among other their way of being, society life, and dances, was different from that of ordinary people.

It is said that all Nordland families may be traced back to the noble family Benkestok. Not all, but however several Nordland families descend cognatically from this family. Among the most prominent is the family Ellingsen, whose progenitor Elling Christophersen (1676–1730) was a great-grandson of Margrethe Benkestok, daughter of Jon Trondson Benkestok.

To Nordland families belong many nationally prominent persons, among others trader Erasmus B.K. Zahl (Knut Hamsun's Mack) of the Zahl family, cabinet minister Sofus A.B. Arctander of the Arctander family, and cabinet minister Jakob M. Schøning of the Schøning family.

== History ==
The concept is of old days. It is frequently used in historical and genealogical literature of the 20th century. Some years after the publication of genealogist Wilhelmine Brandt's Slægten Benkestok (1904), genealogist Stian Herlofsen Finne-Grønn described it as a genealogical magazine for Nordland families. Otherwise the concept occurs among other places in Jakob Schøning's Nordlands-slegten Schøning i 360 aar (1928), Johan Hveding's Nordlandsslekten Hveding (1944), Nils Parelius's Nordlandsslekten Mentzonis opprinnelse (1956) and Gerd Fjellstad's Fra adel til bumenn : Nordlandsslekter (1996).
