= Arctander =

Arctander can refer to:

- Arctander (family)
- Sofus Arctander, Norwegian Minister of the Interior 1884–1885.
- Arctander Township, Minnesota, located in Kandiyohi County, United States.
- Tundra a.k.a. Arctander (musician)
