= Privileged trader =

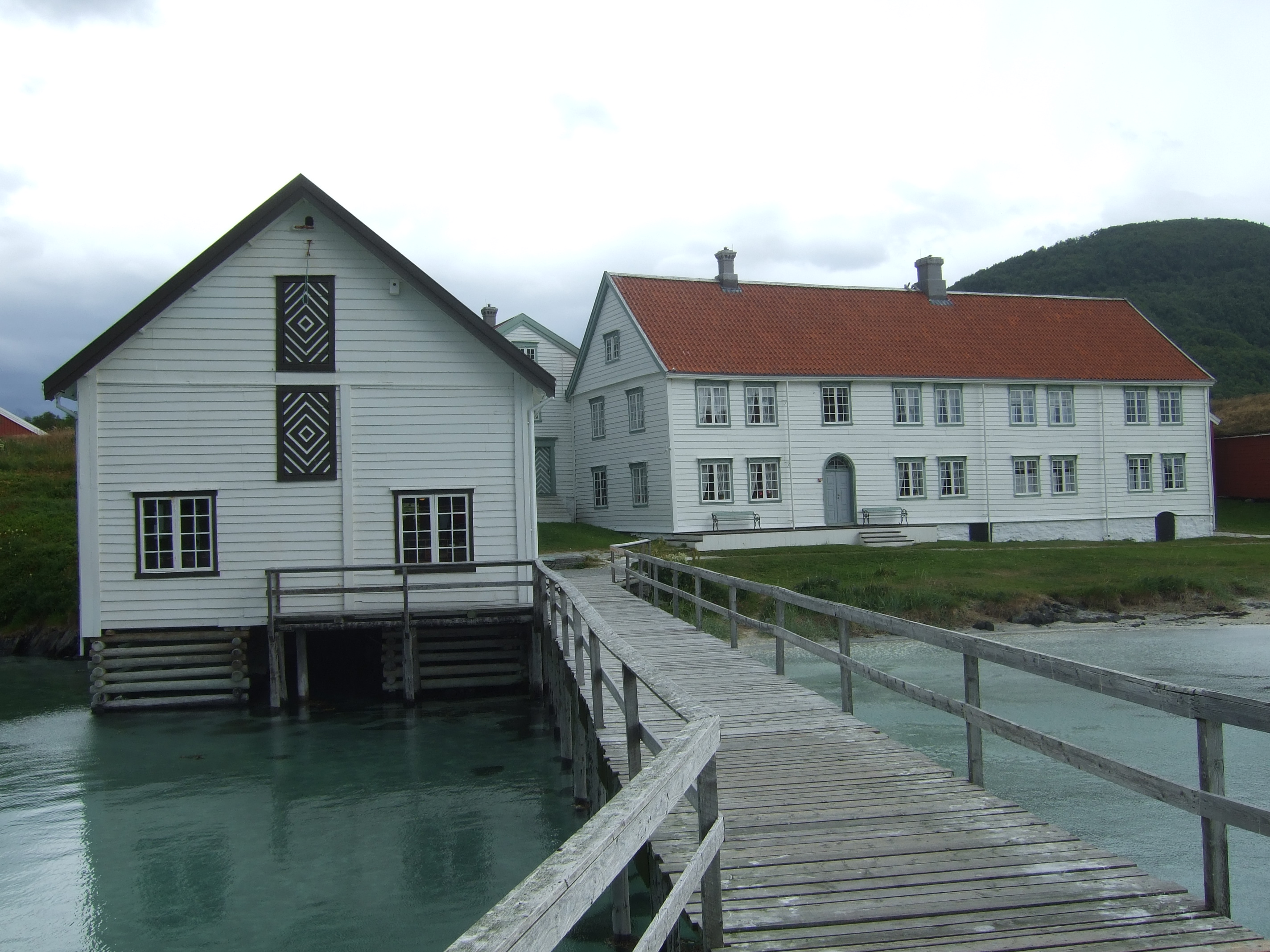
Privileged trader Erasmus Zahl's trading center in Kjerringøy

A privileged trader (Norwegian: nessekonge, lit. 'peninsular king', also known as a væreiere which means 'fishing village owner') is a term that was used for fish merchants or landowners that enjoyed special privileges along the coast of Northern Norway from the second half of the 1700s onward. The term nessekonge itself goes back centuries earlier, to the Viking era, referring to local chieftains that held power over a peninsula. Their privileged status refers to their having received special permission from the king to engage in trade. There are believed to have been 200 to 300 privileged traders' centers or fishing villages from Brønnøysund in the south to Vardø in the north. The privileged traders experienced their peak from the second half of the 1800s to 1910. After this, the development of fishing fleets and public transport by steamship made fishermen less dependent on the local fish buyers, and catches could then be traded wherever the best profit was to be had.

The privileged traders enjoyed a dominant economic, social, and political position in the local milieu. They controlled the local trade, fresh fish purchases, and fish processing, and they often owned the local estate. They sought to supply the locals with all the goods they needed from elsewhere, and this sales monopoly resulted in no room for competition. They covered needs ranging from food and fuel to boats and finished log houses. Often the sale of goods and purchases of fish happened at the same time, so that trade was more of a barter and the privileged trader profited from both the purchase and sale. Because there was little money in circulation, not only these exchanges were kept in written account books, but also the residents' other expenditures were recorded in the books maintained by the privileged trader; for example, taxes or costs of medical treatment. Fishermen’s dole-fish (the share of the catch they were entitled to) was also often handled by the privileged trader, and so he acted as a bank in many ways. This also applied to loans—both for working capital for fishing, as well as consumer loans for houses and land, equipment, and boats. There was often little chance of the debt being paid off. The privileged traders secured the debts by having the borrowers pledge their property as security. If the people could not repay their debt, this could lead to foreclosure or forced sale and the loss of their boats, houses, or other property, which was their source of livelihood. Practice varied on how the debt was enforced; some allowed the old owners to remain on the farm as tenants, whereas others evicted them and brought in new residents. Often the privileged traders had not only a trade monopoly, but also political power, such as mayor or other offices, which often undermined the municipal system.

The best-known privileged trader was Erasmus Zahl of Kjerringøy Municipality, who was the model for Knut Hamsun's character Mack in his novels.

== See also ==
- Aristocracy of Norway
