= Arctander (family) =

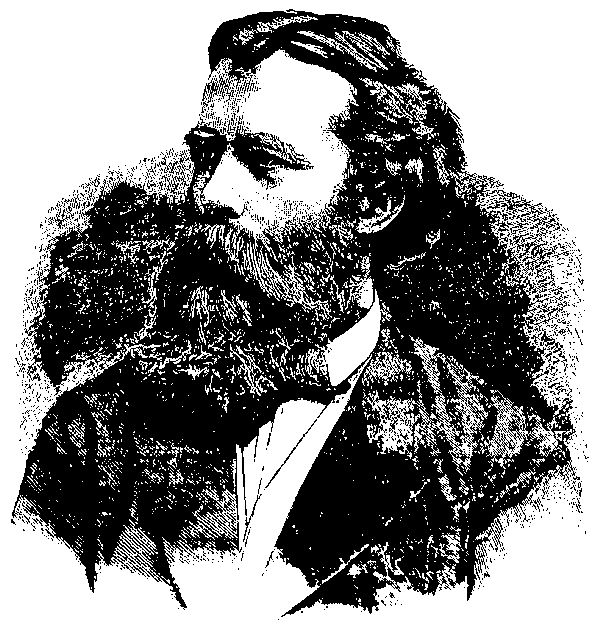
Cabinet minister Sofus Arctander. Drawer: Hans Christian Olsen

Arctander is the name of two Danish and Norwegian families: one from Trondheim and a Nordland family.

== History ==
=== Trondheim/Viborg familu ===
The family Arctander in Trondheim descends from Niels Arctander (born c. 1440) in Denmark. His grandson Niels Lauritzen the Elder (c. 1490–1554) served as Mayor of Trondheim, Norway. His grandchildren, among them Niels Lauritzen the younger(1561–1616), who was a bishop in Viborg, Denmark, adopted the name Arctander.

Niels Lauritzen Arctander's son Henrik Nielsen Archtander (1587–1652) was rector of Viborg Latin School. Henrik Nielsen Archtander's grandson Just Nielsen Archtander (Arctander) (1653–1710) was one of Viborg's wealthiest merchants.

Another branch of the Arctander family, descending from Peder Nielsen Arctander (1533–1609), mayor of Trondheim and the Viborg bishop’s brother, came to Denmark with Hans Nicolai Arctander. He served as county governor of Frederiksborg County from 1805 to 1826.

=== Nordland family ===
The Nordland family Arctander begins with Peder Pedersen (b. ca. 1626), a farmer near Lødingen, Nordland. His grandson, Aron Pedersen, adopted the name Arctander when attending the university in Copenhagen, whereafter he returned to Norway and became a priest in Ofoten. Many prominent people belong to this family, among them cabinet minister Sofus Arctander, Signy Arctander, and Evan Arctander.

== Name ==
The name is in Latinised Greek and means "Norwegian". The first part means arctic, and the second part derives from the word andros (man), i.e. "north man".
