= Nordfold Municipality =

Municipality in Nordland, Norway

Nordfold Municipality Nordfold herred
- Former municipality
- Nordfolden herred (historic name)
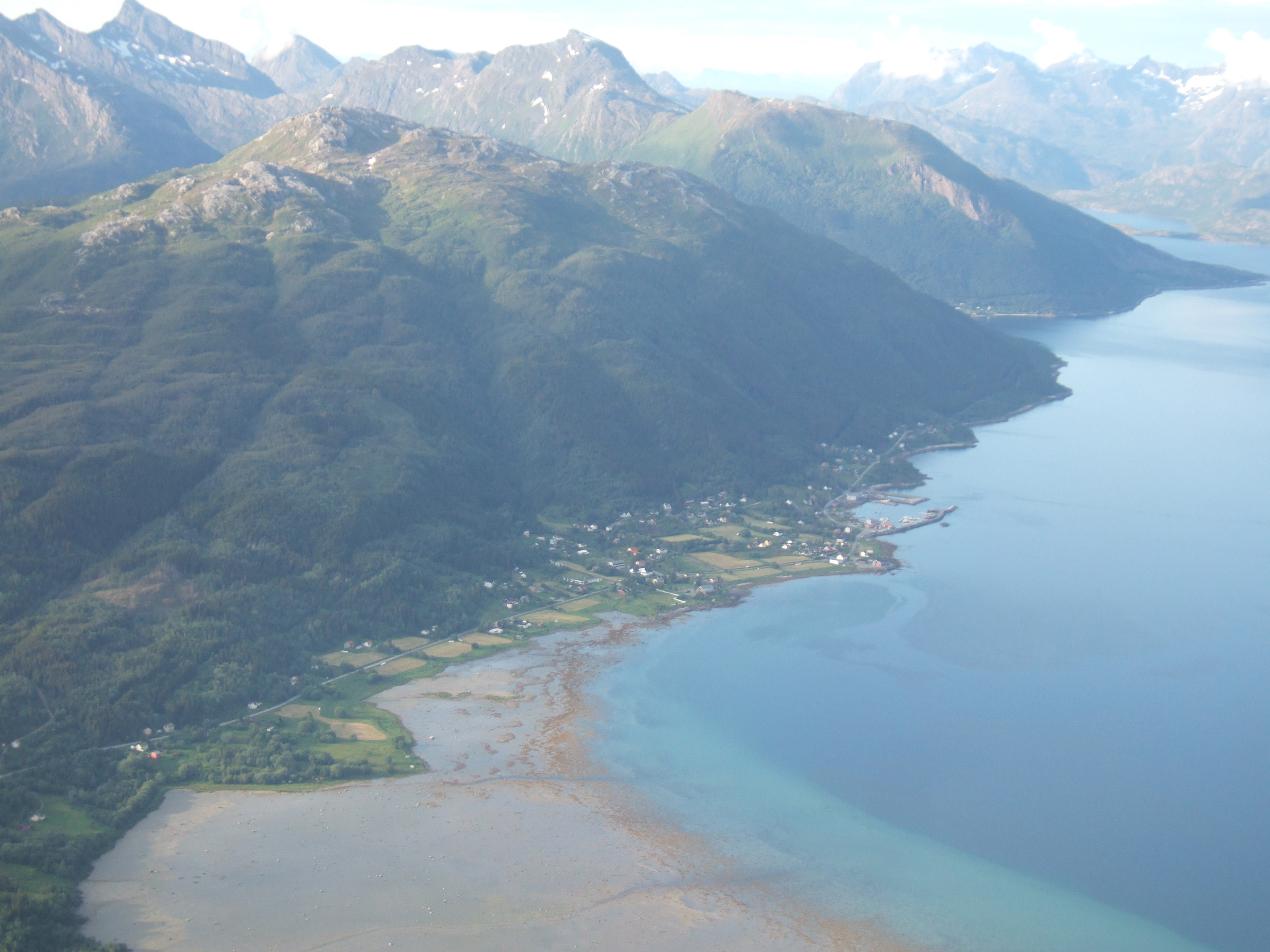
- View of Nordfold

- Nordland within Norway

- Nordfold within Nordland
- Coordinates: 67.7623°N 15.2302°E
- Country: Norway
- County: Nordland
- District: Salten
- Established: 1 Jan 1906
  - Preceded by: Nordfolden-Kjerringø Municipality
- Disestablished: 1 Jan 1964
  - Succeeded by: Steigen Municipality and Sørfold Municipality
- Administrative centre: Nordfold

Area (upon dissolution)
  - Total: 560.8 km^{2} (216.5 sq mi)
  - Rank: #180 in Norway
- Highest elevation: 1,351.15 m (4,432.9 ft)

Population (1963)
  - Total: 1,481
  - Rank: #539 in Norway
  - Density: 2.6/km^{2} (6.7/sq mi)
  - Change (10 years): ▼ −11.4%
- Demonym: Nordfoldværing

Official language
  - Norwegian form: Bokmål
- Time zone: UTC+01:00 (CET)
  - Summer (DST): UTC+02:00 (CEST)
- ISO 3166 code: NO-1846

Nordfold is a former municipality in Nordland county, Norway. The 561-square-kilometre (217 sq mi) municipality existed from 1906 until its dissolution in 1964. The municipality surrounded the Nordfolda branch off of the Folda fjord in what is now Steigen Municipality, plus a small portion of the present-day Sørfold Municipality. The administrative centre of the municipality was the village of Nordfold, where the Nordfold Church is located.

Prior to its dissolution in 1963, the 560.8-square-kilometre (216.5 sq mi) municipality was the 180th largest by area out of the 689 municipalities in Norway. Nordfold Municipality was the 539th most populous municipality in Norway with a population of about 1,481. The municipality's population density was 2.6 inhabitants per square kilometre (6.7/sq mi) and its population had decreased by 11.4% over the previous 10-year period.

== History ==
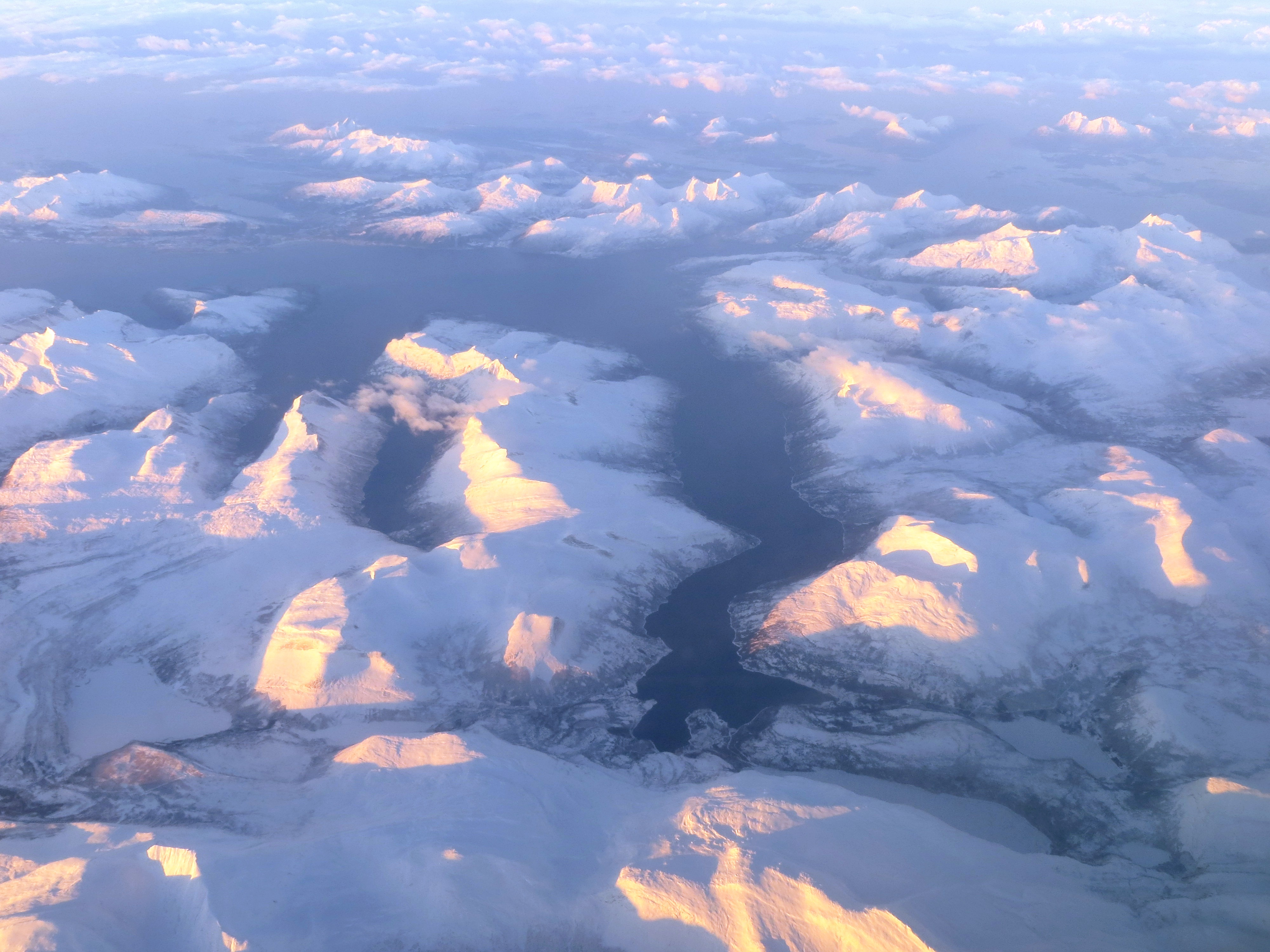
Aerial view of the area that was Nordfold Municipality

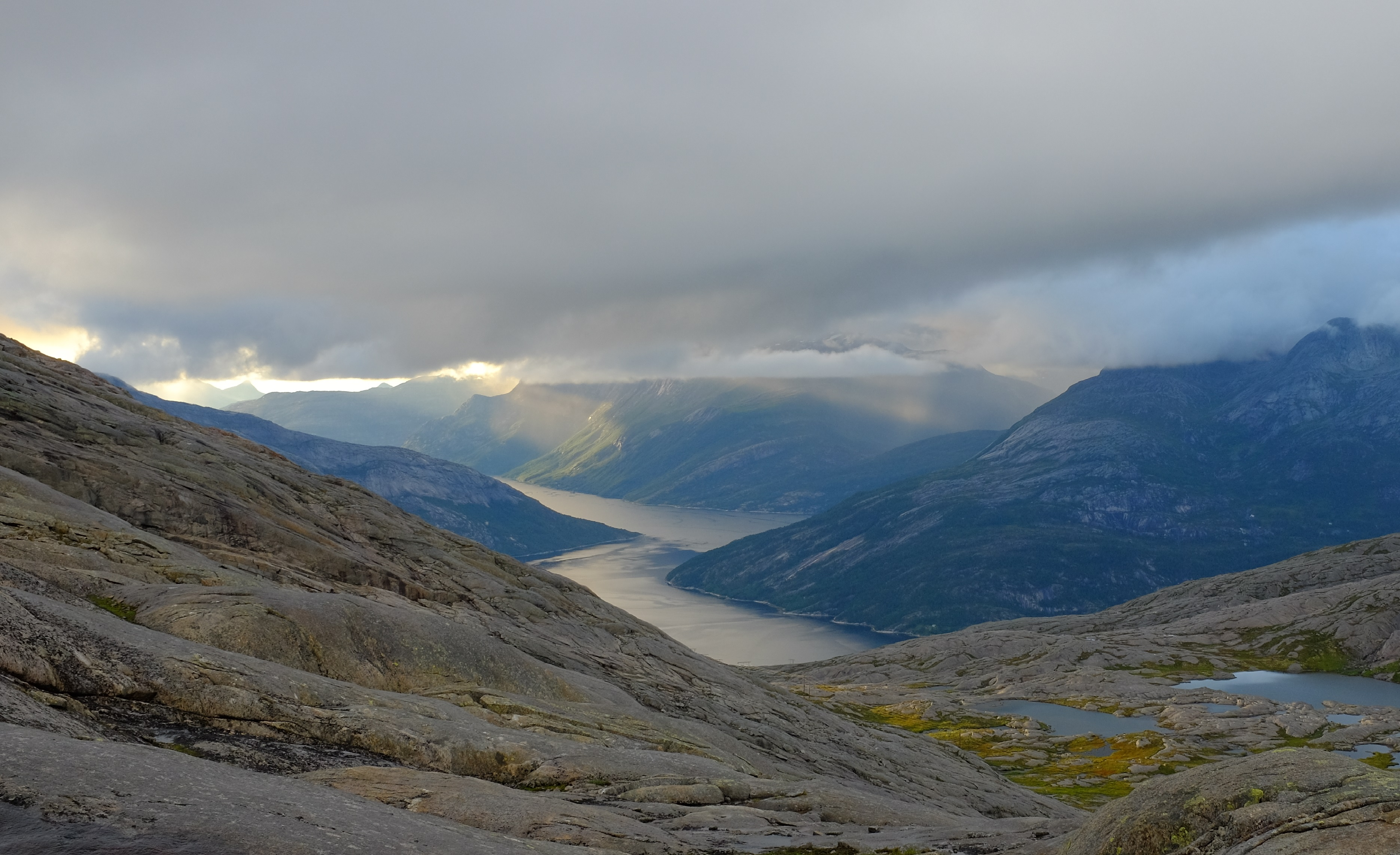
View of the Mørsvikfjorden in the eastern part of the municipality

The municipality of Nordfold was established on 1 January 1906 when the old Nordfolden-Kjerringø Municipality was split into two new municipalities: Nordfold Municipality (population: 1,485) and Kjerringøy Municipality (population: 857). During the 1960s, there were many municipal mergers across Norway due to the work of the Schei Committee. On 1 January 1964, Nordfold Municipality ceased to exist. The eastern Mørsvikbotn district surrounding the Mørsvikfjorden in Nordfold Municipality (population: 268) was merged into the neighboring Sørfold Municipality. The rest of Nordfold Municipality (population: 1,212) was merged with the Brennsund area of Kjerringøy Municipality (population: 30), all of Leiranger Municipality (population: 1,397), a small part of Hamarøy Municipality (population: 77), and all of Steigen Municipality (population: 1,829). to form a new, larger Steigen Municipality.

=== Name ===
The municipality (originally the parish) is named after the local Folda fjord (Old Norse: Fold). The first element is the prefix nord which means "northern". The last element is fold which has an unknown meaning (maybe "the broad one"). The inner part of the fjord is divided into two arms Nordfolda ("the northern Folda") and Sørfolda ("the southern Folda"). Historically, the name of the municipality was spelled Nordfolden. On 6 January 1908, a royal resolution changed the spelling of the name of the municipality to Nordfold, removing the definite form ending -en.

=== Churches ===
The Church of Norway had one parish (sokn) within Nordfold Municipality. At the time of the municipal dissolution, it was part of the Folda prestegjeld and the Bodø prosti (deanery) in the Diocese of Sør-Hålogaland.

Churches in Nordfold Municipality
Parish (sokn)	Church name	Location of the church	Year built
Nordfold	Nordfold Church	Nordfold	1884*
*The church burned down in 1973 and it was rebuilt in 1975.

== Geography ==
The municipality included all the area around the Nordfolda. To the west was Leiranger Municipality, to the northwest was Steigen Municipality, to the northeast was Hamarøy Municipality, and to the south was Sørfold Municipality and Kjerringøy Municipality. The highest point in the municipality was the 1,351.15-metre (4,432.9 ft) tall mountain Helldalisen.

== Government ==
While it existed, Nordfold Municipality was responsible for primary education (through 10th grade), outpatient health services, senior citizen services, welfare and other social services, zoning, economic development, and municipal roads and utilities. The municipality was governed by a municipal council of directly elected representatives. The mayor was indirectly elected by a vote of the municipal council. Hålogaland Court of Appeal.

=== Municipal council ===
The municipal council (Herredsstyre) of Nordfold Municipality was made up of 17 representatives that were elected to four-year terms. The tables below show the historical composition of the council by political party.

Nordfold herredsstyre 1959–1963
Party name (in Norwegian)	Number of representatives
Labour Party (Arbeiderpartiet)	4
Local List(s) (Lokale lister)	13
Total number of members:	17
Note: On 1 January 1964, Nordfold Municipality was divided and became part of Steigen Municipality and Sørfold Municipality.

Nordfold herredsstyre 1955–1959
Party name (in Norwegian)	Number of representatives
Labour Party (Arbeiderpartiet)	6
List of workers, fishermen, and small farmholders (Arbeidere, fiskere, småbrukere liste)	3
Local List(s) (Lokale lister)	8
Total number of members:	17

Nordfold herredsstyre 1951–1955
Party name (in Norwegian)	Number of representatives
Labour Party (Arbeiderpartiet)	7
List of workers, fishermen, and small farmholders (Arbeidere, fiskere, småbrukere liste)	3
Local List(s) (Lokale lister)	6
Total number of members:	16

Nordfold herredsstyre 1947–1951
Party name (in Norwegian)	Number of representatives
Labour Party (Arbeiderpartiet)	3
Local List(s) (Lokale lister)	13
Total number of members:	16

Nordfold herredsstyre 1945–1947
Party name (in Norwegian)	Number of representatives
Labour Party (Arbeiderpartiet)	4
Local List(s) (Lokale lister)	12
Total number of members:	16

Nordfold herredsstyre 1937–1941*
Party name (in Norwegian)	Number of representatives
Labour Party (Arbeiderpartiet)	3
List of workers, fishermen, and small farmholders (Arbeidere, fiskere, småbrukere liste)	2
Local List(s) (Lokale lister)	11
Total number of members:	16
Note: Due to the German occupation of Norway during World War II, no elections were held for new municipal councils until after the war ended in 1945.

=== Mayors ===
The mayor (Norwegian: ordfører) of Nordfold Municipality was the political leader of the municipality and the chairperson of the municipal council. Here is a list of people who held this position:

- 1906–1916: Peter Gylseth
- 1917–1919: Theodor I. Sivertsen
- 1920–1920: Peter Gylseth
- 1920–1922: Theodor I. Sivertsen
- 1923–1931: Agvald Vinkenes
- 1932–1942: Erling J. Vindenes
- 1943–1945: Johan Aasbakk
- 1945–1951: Erling J. Vindenes
- 1956–1959: Guttorm Grytøyr
- 1960–1963: Arne Arntzen

== See also ==
- List of former municipalities of Norway
