= Zahler =

Zahler is a German-language surname of Jewish origin. It originated as a name for a tallyman or clerk, derived from the German word zahlen, which means "to pay". Additionally, it may also be derived from the Middle High German word zagen, which means "tail", as in the surname Zahl.

Notable people with the surname include:

- Lee Zahler (1893–1947), American composer and musical director
- S. Craig Zahler (born 1973), American filmmaker, novelist and composer
