= Zahl (surname) =

Zahl is a surname. Notable people with the surname include:

- Zahl (Norwegian family)
- Cato Zahl Pedersen (born 1959), a Norwegian skier
- Erasmus Zahl (1826–1900), a Norwegian tradesman and supporter of Knut Hamsun
- Geir Zahl (born 1975), a Norwegian musician
- Harold A. Zahl (1905–1983), an American physicist
