= Kjerringøy Municipality =

Former municipality in Nordland, Norway

Kjerringøy Municipality Kjerringøy herred
- Former municipality
- Kjerringø herred (historic name)
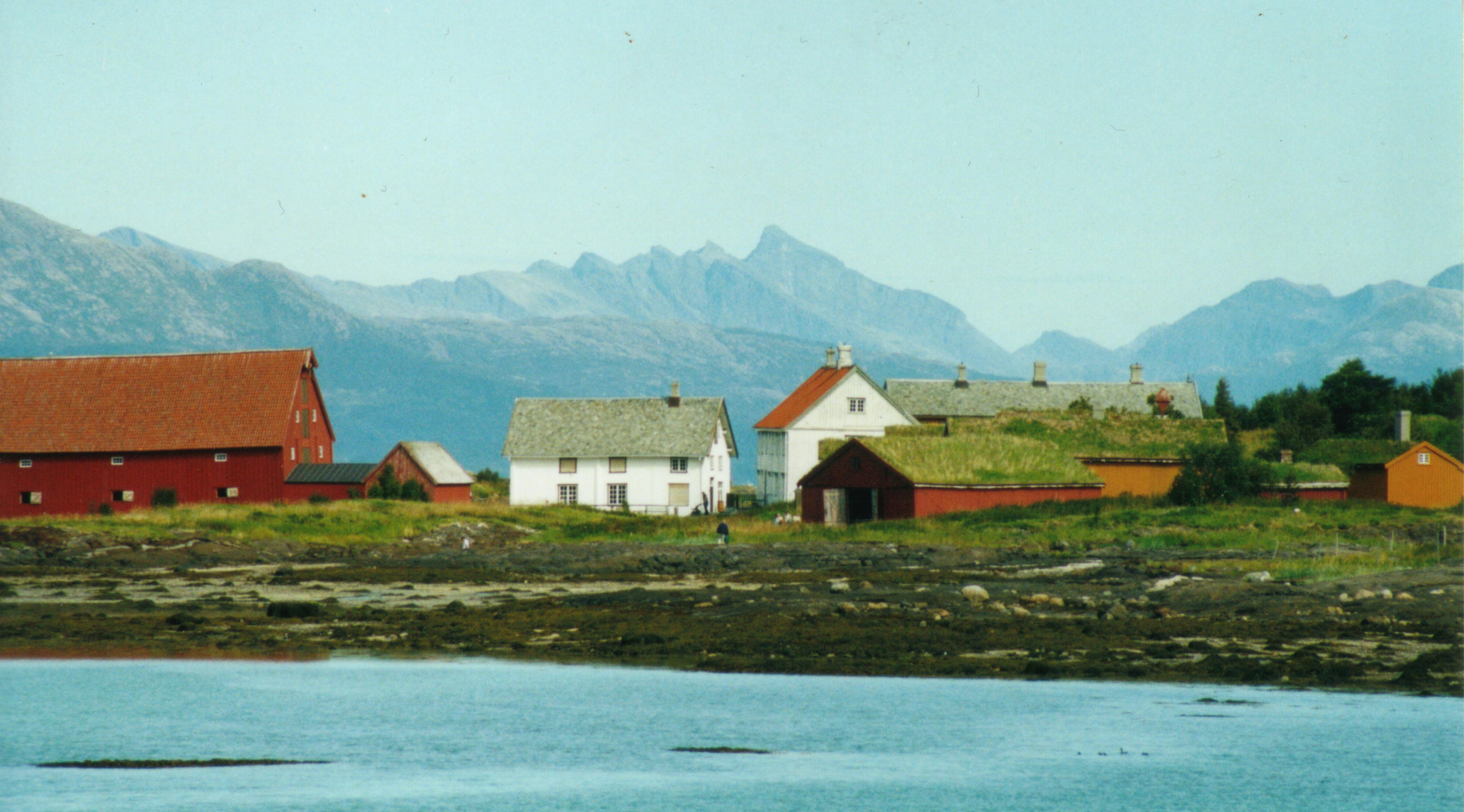
- View of the village of Kjerringøy

- Nordland within Norway

- Kjerringøy within Nordland
- Coordinates: 67.5195°N 14.7643°E
- Country: Norway
- County: Nordland
- District: Salten
- Established: 1 Jan 1906
  - Preceded by: Nordfolden-Kjerringø Municipality
- Disestablished: 1 Jan 1964
  - Succeeded by: Bodin Municipality and Steigen Municipality
- Administrative centre: Kjerringøy

Area (upon dissolution)
  - Total: 176.1 km^{2} (68.0 sq mi)
  - Rank: #406 in Norway
- Highest elevation: 1,156 m (3,793 ft)

Population (1963)
  - Total: 573
  - Rank: #672 in Norway
  - Density: 3.3/km^{2} (8.5/sq mi)
  - Change (10 years): ▼ −17%
- Demonym: Kjerringøyværing

Official language
  - Norwegian form: Neutral
- Time zone: UTC+01:00 (CET)
  - Summer (DST): UTC+02:00 (CEST)
- ISO 3166 code: NO-1844

Kjerringøy is a former municipality in Nordland county, Norway. The 176-square-kilometre (68 sq mi) municipality existed from 1906 until its dissolution in 1964. The municipality included the coastal and island areas around the entrance to the Folda fjord, plus the northern coast of the Mistfjorden to the south of the Folda fjord. About 400 small islands totaling about 11 square kilometres (4.2 sq mi) were part of the municipality. The areas are located in what is now Bodø Municipality and a small part in Steigen Municipality. The administrative centre of the municipality was the village of Kjerringøy where Kjerringøy Church is located.

Prior to its dissolution in 1963, the 176-square-kilometre (68 sq mi) municipality was the 406th largest by area out of the 689 municipalities in Norway. Kjerringøy Municipality was the 672nd most populous municipality in Norway with a population of about 573. The municipality's population density was 3.3 inhabitants per square kilometre (8.5/sq mi) and its population had decreased by 17% over the previous 10-year period.

== General information ==
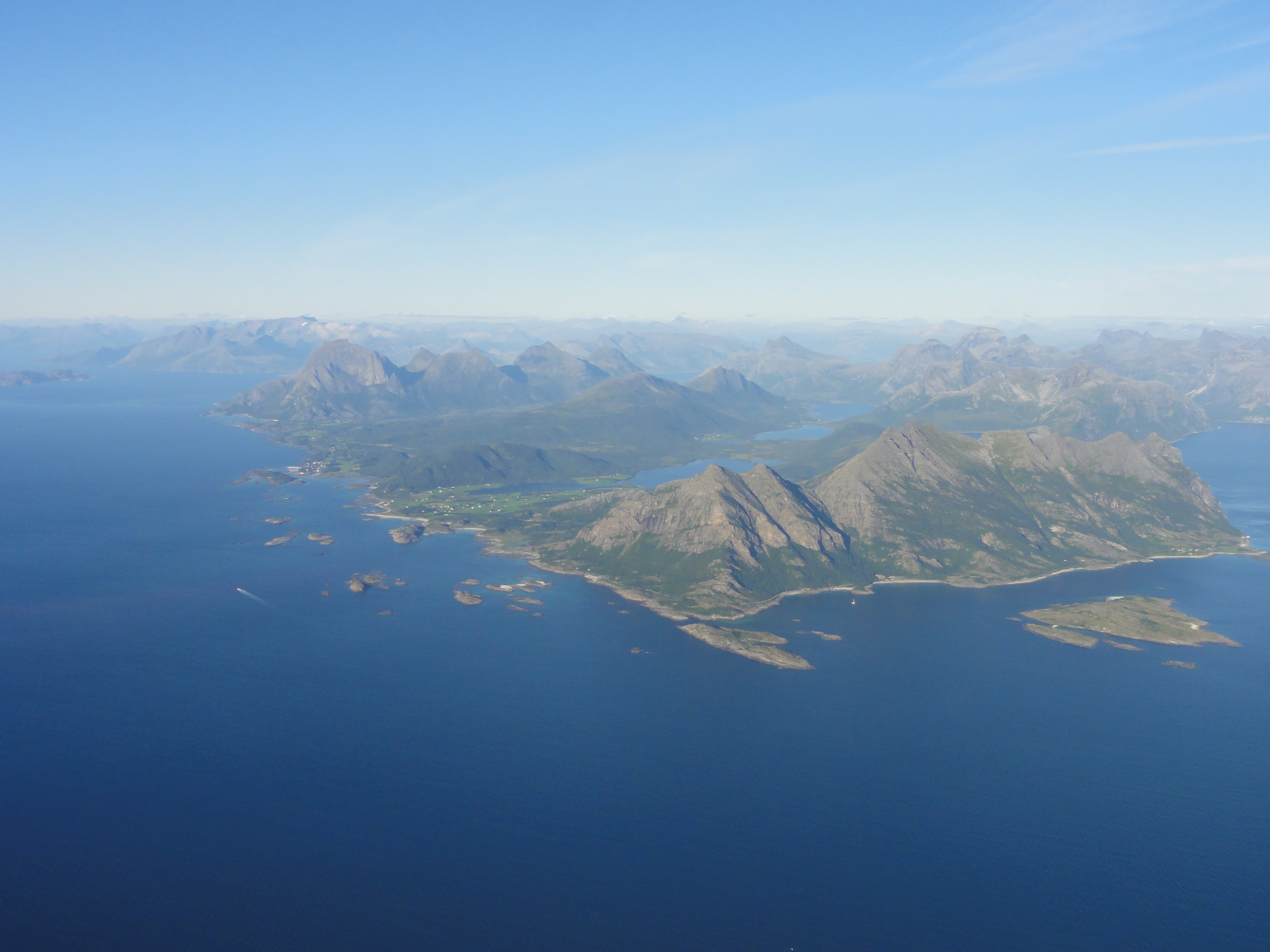
Southwestern part of Kjerringøy

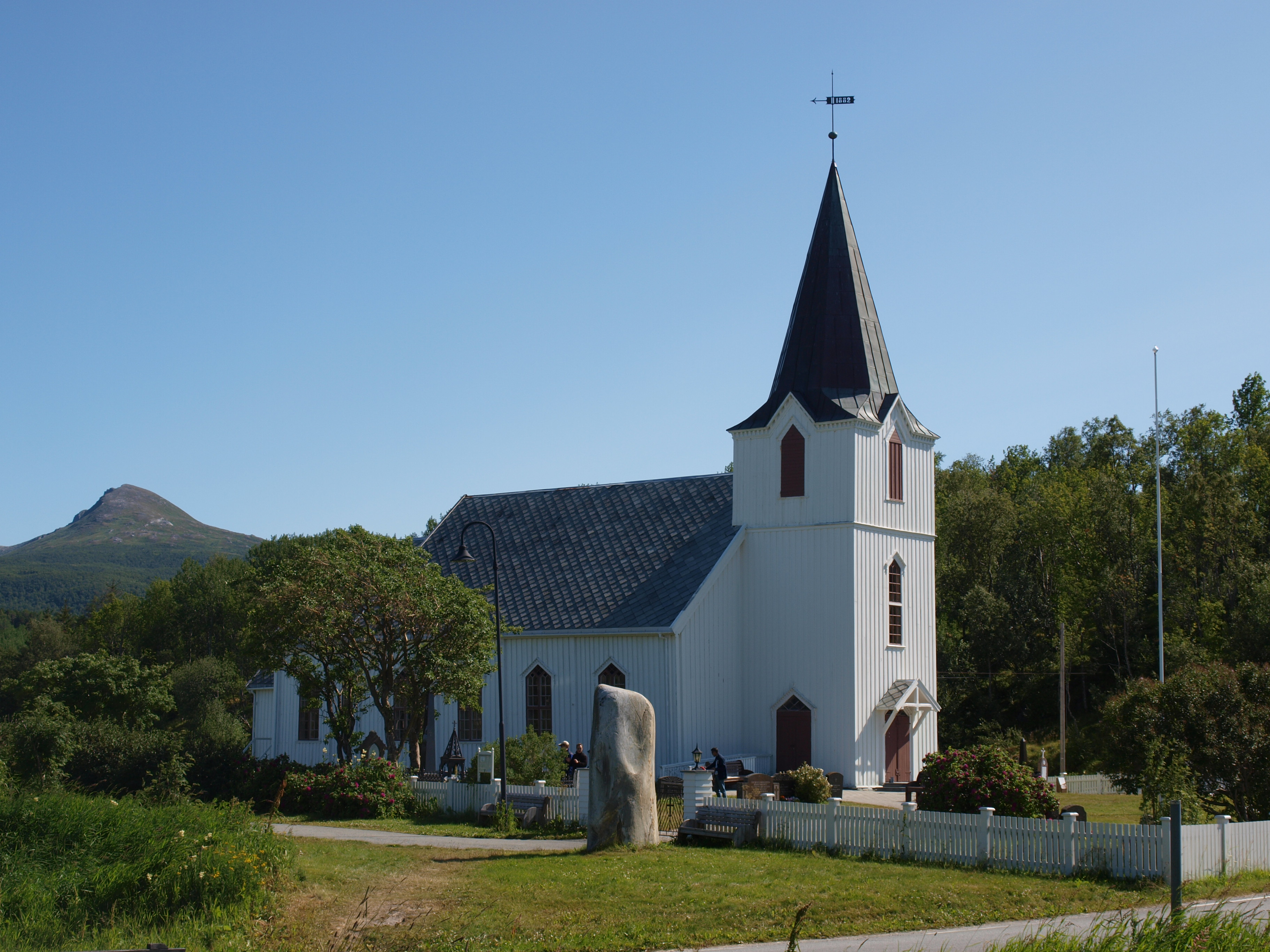
View of the Kjerringøy Church

The municipality of Kjerringøy was established on 1 January 1906 when the old Nordfolden-Kjerringø Municipality was split into Kjerringøy Municipality (population: 857) and Nordfold Municipality (population: 1,485).

During the 1960s, there were many municipal mergers across Norway due to the work of the Schei Committee. On 1 January 1964, Kjerringøy Municipality ceased to exist. Most of Kjerringøy Municipality (population: 524) was incorporated into Bodin Municipality, its neighbor to the south. The Brennsund district, north of the Folda fjord (population: 30), was incorporated into Steigen Municipality. Prior to the merger Kjerringøy had a population of 574. Later, on 1 January 1968, Bodin Municipality (including most of the old Kjerringøy Municipality) was incorporated into Bodø Municipality.

=== Name ===
The municipality (originally the parish) is named after the old Kjerringøy farm (Old Norse: Kerlingarøy) since the first Kjerringøy Church was built there. The first element is the genitive case of kerling which means "of the old woman", probably meaning that the land was once owned by a widow. The last element is øy which means "island".

Historically, the name of the municipality was spelled Kjerringø. On 6 January 1908, a royal resolution changed the spelling of the name of the municipality to Kjerringøy. The letter y was added to the end of the word to "Norwegianize" the name (ø is the Danish word for "island" and øy is the Norwegian word).

=== Churches ===
The Church of Norway had one parish (sokn) within Kjerringøy Municipality. At the time of the municipal dissolution, it was part of the Kjerringøy prestegjeld and the Bodø prosti (deanery) in the Diocese of Sør-Hålogaland.

Churches in Kjerringøy Municipality
Parish (sokn)	Church name	Location of the church	Year built
Kjerringøy	Kjerringøy Church	Kjerringøy	1883

== Geography ==
The municipality included all the area around the entrance to the Folda fjord. To the north was Leiranger Municipality and Nordfold Municipality, to the east was Sørfold Municipality, and to the south was Bodin Municipality. The highest point in the municipality was the 1,156-metre (3,793 ft) tall mountain Breiviktinden.

== Government ==
While it existed, Kjerringøy Municipality was responsible for primary education (through 10th grade), outpatient health services, senior citizen services, welfare and other social services, zoning, economic development, and municipal roads and utilities. The municipality was governed by a municipal council of directly elected representatives. The mayor was indirectly elected by a vote of the municipal council. The municipality was under the jurisdiction of the Hålogaland Court of Appeal.

=== Municipal council ===
The municipal council (Herredsstyre) of Kjerringøy Municipality was made up of representatives that were elected to four-year terms. The tables below show the historical composition of the council by political party.

Kjerringøy herredsstyre 1959–1963
Party name (in Norwegian)	Number of representatives
Labour Party (Arbeiderpartiet)	8
Joint List(s) of Non-Socialist Parties (Borgerlige Felleslister)	5
Total number of members:	13
Note: On 1 January 1964, Kjerringøy Municipality became part of Bodin Municipality.

Kjerringøy herredsstyre 1955–1959
Party name (in Norwegian)	Number of representatives
Labour Party (Arbeiderpartiet)	8
Christian Democratic Party (Kristelig Folkeparti)	2
Joint List(s) of Non-Socialist Parties (Borgerlige Felleslister)	3
Total number of members:	13

Kjerringøy herredsstyre 1951–1955
Party name (in Norwegian)	Number of representatives
Labour Party (Arbeiderpartiet)	7
Christian Democratic Party (Kristelig Folkeparti)	2
Joint List(s) of Non-Socialist Parties (Borgerlige Felleslister)	3
Total number of members:	12

Kjerringøy herredsstyre 1947–1951
Party name (in Norwegian)	Number of representatives
Labour Party (Arbeiderpartiet)	8
Christian Democratic Party (Kristelig Folkeparti)	4
Total number of members:	12

Kjerringøy herredsstyre 1945–1947
Party name (in Norwegian)	Number of representatives
Labour Party (Arbeiderpartiet)	10
Joint List(s) of Non-Socialist Parties (Borgerlige Felleslister)	2
Total number of members:	12

Kjerringøy herredsstyre 1937–1941*
Party name (in Norwegian)	Number of representatives
Labour Party (Arbeiderpartiet)	6
List of workers, fishermen, and small farmholders (Arbeidere, fiskere, småbrukere liste)	6
Total number of members:	12
Note: Due to the German occupation of Norway during World War II, no elections were held for new municipal councils until after the war ended in 1945.

=== Mayors ===
The mayor (Norwegian: ordfører) of Kjerringøy Municipality was the political leader of the municipality and the chairperson of the municipal council. Here is a list of people who held this position:

- 1906–1907: Peder Nilssen-Fjære
- 1908–1934: Gerhard Kristiansen
- 1935–1937: Elling Tidemann
- 1938–1940: Otto Fredriksen
- 1940–1945: Rolf Johnsen
- 1945–1947: Otto Fredriksen
- 1948–1959: Henry Skålsvik
- 1960–1963: Berby Johansen

== See also ==
- List of former municipalities of Norway
