= Zahl =

Zahl may refer to:

- Zahl (surname)
- Zahl, North Dakota, unincorporated community in northwestern Williams County, North Dakota, United States
  - Lake Zahl National Wildlife Refuge, Williams County in the U.S. state of North Dakota

== Fiction ==
- General Zahl, a DC Comics villain
