= Anna Karoline =

1876 Norwegian cargo vessel

Coordinates: 67°16′05″N 14°25′34″E

History

Norway
- Name: Anna Karoline
- Launched: 1876
- In service: 1876–1954
- Home port: Bodø
- Fate: Museum ship

General characteristics
- Class & type: Jekt
- Length: Hull: 60 ft 0 in (18.29 m)
- Beam: 21 ft (6.40 m)
- Draught: 6 ft (1.8 m)
- Propulsion: Sail
- Speed: 8 kn (15 km/h)
- Capacity: 90 tons d.w. (or 100 fathom firewood)
- Complement: 5–6

Anna Karoline is a jekt (a single-masted open cargo sailing ship) often called Nordlandsjekt, built at Brataker in Mosvik Municipality, Norway in 1876.

The jekt type was for centuries the most important freight vessel along the coast of Norway and Anna Karoline is typical for jekt vessels sailing between Northern Norway and Bergen. She was purchased by the museum Nordland County Museum (now the Nordland Museum) in 1954 and placed ashore at Bodøsjøen south of the center of the city of Bodø. The Nordland Museum has plans for constructing a large building around Anna Karoline to preserve the vessel and exhibit her as a museum ship.

== Jekt as freight vessel ==
Comparison between clinker build and carvel built ship hull

The jekt was used as a freight vessel along the Norwegian coast from around the 17th century and until the early 20th century, when the use steadily declined. The vessel type was built from Hardanger in the south to Beiarn Municipality in the north. At most around 200 jekts sailed from northern Norway to Bergen with stockfish. The jekt had a distinct appearance and was a sturdy freighter with a large capacity for cargo. Under good conditions the voyage could go fast, there are stories about voyages from Lofoten to Bergen in around three days, which makes a speed around 8 knots. It is possible that the vessel type is based on earlier Norwegian vessels, but that foreign vessels also have been an inspiration. The encyclopedia Store norske leksikon has this definition of jekt (nordlandsjekt):

The nordlandsjekt were clinker built with transom stern, with a high straight bow. Most of the jekts had only half of the deck covered, and always had a veng (Norwegian for a kind of Aftercastle) aft. The mast was without stays and was rigged with two square sails (main sail and top sail).

The jekt was not easy to sail, but they could carry much cargo compared to the materials used for the vessel. It was thus probably due to economy that they became so popular. The last jekts were built in Trøndelag. By the early 20th century the jekt had been replaced by larger sailing vessels and steamships.

For centuries jekts were important for Northern Norway's export of stockfish. Each jekt could make two voyages a year to Bergen with this cargo, the city had for many hundred years monopoly on trading with Northern Norway. After the stockfish cargo had been loaded in Bergen the jekt would return with goods that Northern Norway did not produce.

== Life of Anna Karoline ==
Anna Karoline was built in 1876 for Arnt O. Eggen, Oluf Nøst and Ole Vandsvik. The name Anna Karoline were composed from the names of the three first owners.

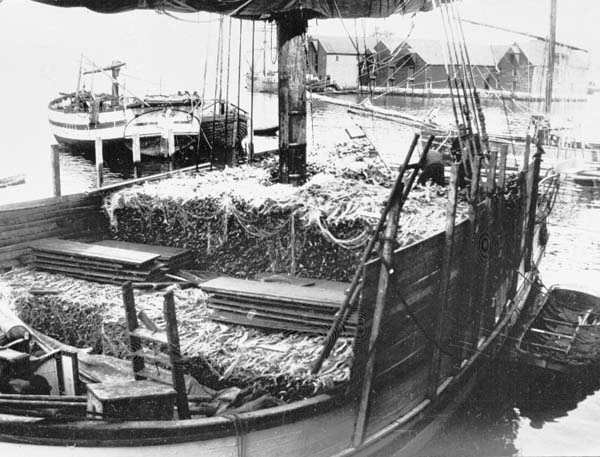
A jekt with stockfish in Sandviken in Bergen. Photography taken some time between 1870 and 1890

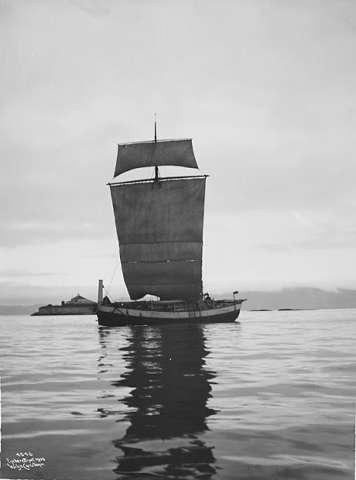
A jekt at Munkholmen, Trondheim Credit: A.B. Wilse, 1906

Anna Karoline served as a cargo vessel and the cargo changed depending on what owners she had, time of the year and where she was stationed. When Ole Vandsvik was one of the owners Anna Karoline started the new year with a voyage to Lofoten to buy fish. The fish was salted on board the vessel and she returned in May to Kiran in Roan Municipality where the fish was dried. While the fish was drying the jekt was transporting timber from the river Namsen to Northern Norway. When the fish had dried the vessel was loaded with stockfish, and sailed to Bergen. The vessel was also used for transporting herring and as sleeping quarters during fishing.

Anna Karoline is marked by various repairs and changes which makes it possible to study how the vessel has developed. She was originally clinker built and without a deck covering her cargo hold. In 1890 Anna Karoline ran aground at Kirangrunnen and subsequently towed to Trondheim where the outer hull was plained and a smooth carvel skin was added. Thus one can today see that the vessel has both clinker hull and carvel hull. Anna Karoline got new owners in 1903, they installed a 16 hp engine.

After Johan Bjørvik and Ole Schiefloe bought Anna Karoline she was used during the yearly fisheries in Lofoten. She sailed north in January and had for many years station at Tinn in Lofoten. The firm sold various goods and fishing equipment. While she was used as a floating general store during the fisheries, the vessel was also used for processing fish. In the spring the vessel sailed south to Bergen or Trondheim, before returning to Lofoten for a new cargo of fish.

In 1908 Anna Karoline's homeport was changed to Namsos after she was bought by Julius Pedersen and manager Schiefloe. She was mainly used to ship timber from Trøndelag to Northern Norway. The vessel had the same trade while she was owned by Spillum Dampsag & Høvleri.

After a new grounding in Bodø in 1908 she was again repaired. and the vessel now got a deck over the cargo hold. In 1916 she got a 30 hp engine. Anna Karoline kept her full rig until 1932, when it was removed. The same year major repairs of her hull were carried out. The vessel got a new transom and the deck was changed both aft and at the bow. In the 1950s the hull over water was changed. When she was bought by Nordland Museum in 1954 brackets were placed under the vessel and needed repairs were done.

Anna Karoline was bought in 1929 by the firm J. Angell & Sønner in Hopen in Lofoten. The vessel was used both summer and winter. During the winter Anna Karoline was used while fish were salted and for producing cod liver oil, she had similar duties in Finnmark in the spring. During summer Anna Karoline transported guano and stockfish from Nordland and Troms south to Bergen.

== At the museum ==
The last port of call for Anna Karoline was Bodøsjøen outside the center of Bodø, where she arrived in 1959. For some 30 years she has had a roof as cover and after some years walls were added. The facilities are viewed as far from ideal and the vessel should have a permanent building. Nordland Museum is working with a project for a building where the vessel can be both preserved and exhibited for visitors.

The background for Nordland Museum buying Anna Karoline was that she was seen as a specimen of a historically important vessel type. The museum first bought the jekt Brødrene in 1939 for this purpose. The vessel was transferred to Rognan for some needed repairs but around Christmas 1940 she shipwrecked during a storm. Due to World War II it was not possible to save the wreck, so Brødrene was lost.

The desire to document the jekt as a vessel was still there and after the war the Nordland Museum was urged to buy a new jekt. Anna Karoline was chosen because she was in a relatively original condition and she is the only Nordlandsjekt in such condition that has been preserved. As of 2014 there are three other jekts in Norway. It is the newly built copy of the jekt Brødrene and the jekt Pauline of Steinkjer, the latter is so much repaired and rebuilt that she is far from her original condition. Both are carvel built and sailing, contrary to Anna Karoline which is on land. The Holvikejekta located at Sandane in western Norway is also ashore and as Anna Karoline she is also clinker built.

It is the only larger traditionally Norwegian cargo vessel from after the reformation which one can say is placed wholly within Norwegian shipbuilding tradition.

— Johan Kloster, curator of the Norwegian Maritime Museum, about the vessel Anna Karoline.

== List of owners ==
- 1876 – Built for Arnt O. Eggen, Oluf Nøst and Ole Vandsvik
- 1889 – Ole Vandsvik
- 1890 – Ole Vandsvik and Ole Lund
- Unknown year – Ole Vandsvik, Ole Lund and Nils Wandsvik
- Unknown year – Nils Wandsvik and Ole Vandsvik
- Unknown year – Oliver Fossum, Trondheim
- 1903 – Johan Bjørvik, Trondheim and Ole Schiefloe, Namsos
- 1908 – Julius Pedersen and manager Schiefloe
- 1922 – Spillum Dampsag & Høvleri, (P. Torkildsen & co)
- 1929 – J. Angell & sønner, Hopen in Lofoten
- 1954 – Bought by Nordland Museum

== See also ==
- Nordlandsbåt

== Bibliography ==
- Eivind Thorsvik, «Jektesaken», fra Nordland Fylkesmuseum årsberetning for 1964–1965, skannet versjon (PDF-fil)
- Bernhard Færøyvik, Inshore Craft of Norway, Grøndahl & Søn Forlag, Oslo, 1979 ISBN 82-504-0373-8 (bokhylla.no)
- Gøthe Gøthesen, Norskekystens fraktemenn : om seilfartøyer i kystfart, Grøndahl & Søn Forlag, Oslo, 1980 ISBN 82-504-0415-7 (bokhylla.no)
- Olav Helseth, Jektfarten i Salten etter 1814, Norsk Sjøfartsmuseum, Oslo 1938 (bokhylla.no)
- Kurt Haukaas, Fiske og Fraktebåter fra Fosen 1920–1985 Tapir Akademisk Forlag, Trondheim 2009, ISBN 9788251924405
