= Signy Arctander =

Norwegian statistician and economist

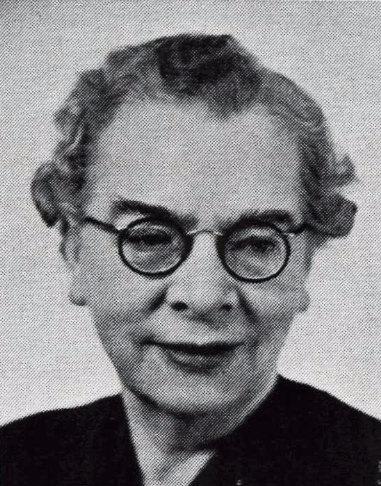
- Born: 26 October 1895; Bergen, Norway
- Died: 23 September 1971 (aged 75)
- Occupations: statistician and economist
- Awards: Order of St. Olav

Signy Arctander (26 October 1895 – 23 September 1971) was a Norwegian statistician and economist. She worked for Statistics Norway from 1920 until her retirement in 1965, and from 1960 to 1963 was acting director. Arctander studied and published on issues such as variation in social conditions across Norway and the participation of women in the workforce. Among her research works are Miljøundersøkelse for Oslo from 1928, two reports on the situation of children, and the study Arbeidsvilkår for hushjelp from 1937. She was decorated Knight, First Class of the Order of St. Olav in 1966.

== Biography ==
Arctander was born in Bergen, a daughter of politician Sofus Arctander and Maren Sofie Aars (1849–1940). She grew up in Kristiania, and took her artium exam in 1915. She then studied economics at the university. Arctander became a cand.oecon. in 1919, and in 1922 studied statistics in Munich and Copenhagen with a public scholarship.

Arctander was a member of the Kameratklubben, which aimed to improve understanding between working women and women students. Arctander led the association for some years, and in 1937 wrote an account of their first 25 years. She was also active in the Norwegian Association for Social Work.

During the Second World War, Arctander was recruited to the resistance by Gunnar John, the bureau's director. She was imprisoned in 1944 and held at Grini detention camp until Norway's liberation.

Arctander was a statistician and economist. She was appointed at Statistics Norway from 1920, originally as a secretary, and worked for this institution until her retirement in 1965; from 1960 to 1963 as acting director. She was at that time Norway's highest ranking woman civil servant. Arctander studied and published on issues such as variation in social conditions across Norway and the participation of women in the workforce. Among her research works are Miljøundersøkelse for Oslo from 1928, two reports on the situation of children, and the study Arbeidsvilkår for hushjelp from 1937.

She was decorated Knight, First Class of the Order of St. Olav in 1966. She died in Oslo in 1975, aged 75.

A house at Pilestredet 40 in Oslo is named for her.
