= Centre d'Etudes Universitaires de Zahlé et de la Békaa =

- Campus de Zahlé et de la Békaa
- Established: 24 January 1977; 49 years ago

Centre d'Études Universitaires de Zahlé et de la Békaa or CEUZB is a university institution based in the Bekaa Valley of Lebanon. It has been promoting post-secondary French education in the province for over 25 years, and is a sub-department of the USJ (Université Saint-Joseph), originally based in Beirut. It specializes in scientific subjects such as mathematics, physics, and informatics. More than a thousand students attended it in 2005.

The engineering schools École Supérieure des Ingénieurs d'Agronomie Méditerranéenne (ESIAM) and the École Supérieure des Ingénieurs Agro-alimentaires (ESIA) are sister foundations of the CEUZB.
