= Zahle (surname) =

Zahle or Zähle is a surname. Notable people with the surname include:

- Carl Theodor Zahle (1866–1946), Danish lawyer and politician
- Herluf Zahle (1873–1941), Danish barrister
- Max Zähle (born 1977), German filmmaker
- Natalie Zahle (1827–1913), Danish reformer
