= Zahl (Norwegian family) =

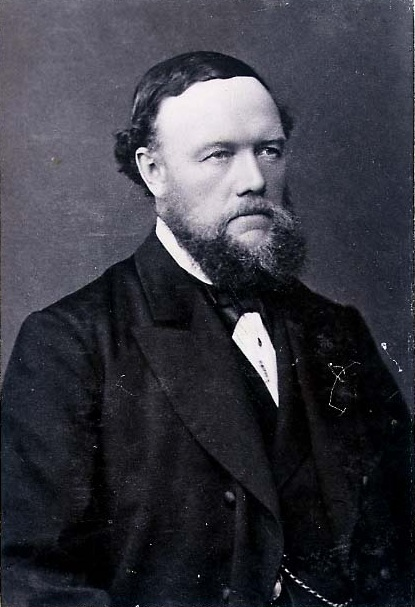
Erasmus B.K. Zahl. Photographer: Mr Finne

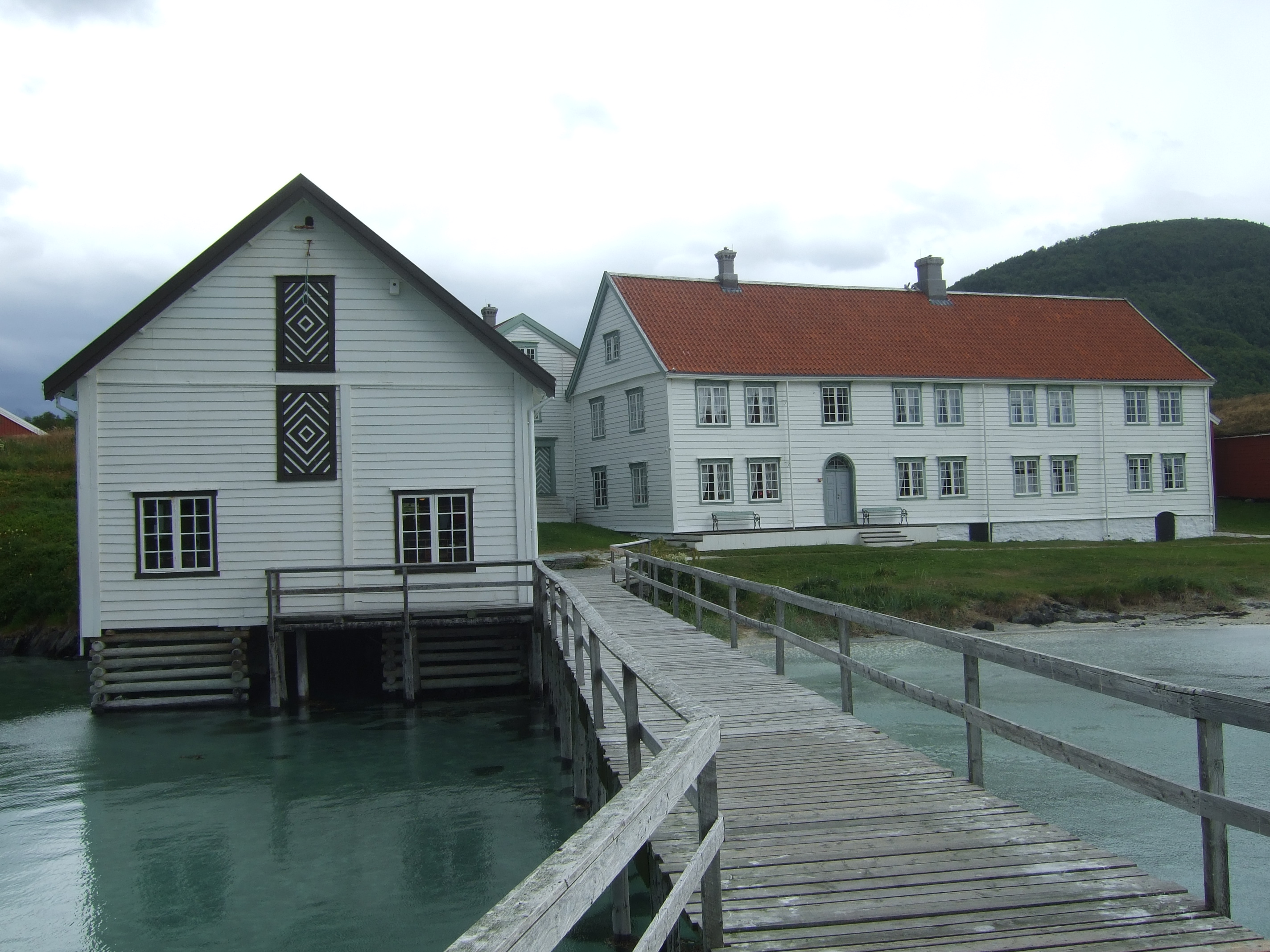
Trade seat of Kjerringøy. Photographer: Harald Groven

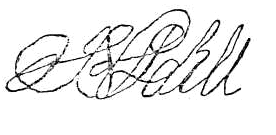
Signature of sheriff Jens Nielsen Zahl, here spelled J N Sahll.

Zahl or Sahl is a Nordland family belonging to and mainly living in the County of Nordland in Norway. The family arrived there in the 17th century. Traditionally, members of the family have been traders, shippers, and sheriffs.

== History ==
The family immigrated from Denmark to Norway in the 17th century with Niels Jensen Zahl (Saell), District Stipendiary Magistrate (Norwegian: sorenskriver) in the 1620s and residing in Vadsø. The family's geographical origin is uncertain. Several villages named Sahl/Sall in Denmark are presented as likely possibilities.

Family members have been traders and shippers, and some have as sheriffs (Norwegian: lensmann) held local police authority. Among trade seats related to the family are Kjerringøy and Nordvika on the island of Dønna.

Among prominent members of the family is Erasmus B.K. Zahl (1826–1900), a wealthy trader and an island owner (Norwegian: væreier) in Kjerringøy. In the late 1800s, he gave financial support to Knut Hamsun, then a young and poor author. Later, Hamsun—a 1920 Nobel Literature Prize laureate—used Zahl as a model for the famous character Mack appearing in many of his novels, among others Pan (1894).

Anders Nicolai Zahl (1807–1857) of the Nordvika branch married Lorentze Sophie Lie, née Krogh (b. 1797), a daughter of Mathias Bonsach Krogh, bishop of Hålogaland.

== Name ==
Whilst the name in the aspect of orthography is identical with the German word Zahl, which means digit or number, its etymological origin remains unknown or unconfirmed. Among other spellings are Sahl, Saell, and Zal. As the name has been inherited also from mothers through generations, the group of past and present name bearers belong to various patrilineally defined families. The two most important branches are that whose paternal line descends from shipper Tomas of Sund in Leirfjord and that whose paternal line descends from trader Hans Olsen Zahl of Nordvika (in present-day Dønna Municipality). Erasmus Zahl belonged to the latter.

== See also ==
- Erasmus Zahl
- Nordland families

== Literature ==
- Meyer, Anton Zahl: Leines Landet i Leirfjord – Landet, folket og historien 2007.
- NRK.no: Nordland fylkesleksikon: Zahl på Kjerringøy
- Store norske leksikon: Kjerringøy handelssted at snl.no
- Norsk biografisk leksikon: Knut Hamsun at snl.no
