= Kjerringøy Church =

Church in Nordland, Norway

- Kjerringøy kirke
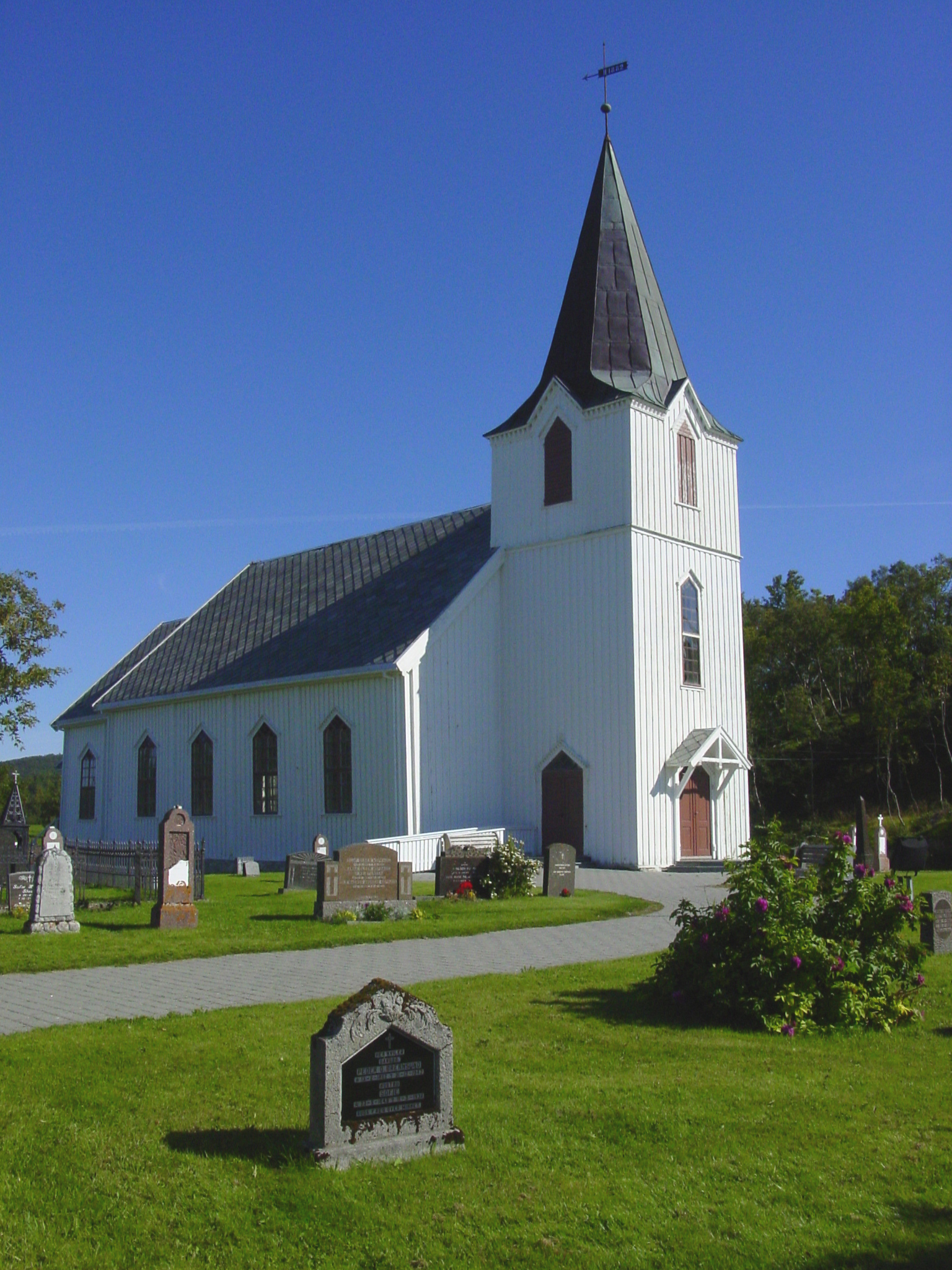
- View of the church
- Kjerringøy Church
- 67.5188622°N 14.7587463°E
- Location: Bodø Municipality, Nordland
- Country: Norway
- Denomination: Church of Norway
- Churchmanship: Evangelical Lutheran

History
- Status: Parish church
- Founded: 14th century
- Consecrated: 1883

Architecture
- Functional status: Active
- Architect: J. E. Olsen
- Architectural type: Long church
- Completed: 1883 (143 years ago)

Specifications
- Capacity: 300
- Materials: Wood

Administration
- Diocese: Sør-Hålogaland
- Deanery: Bodø domprosti
- Parish: Kjerringøy og Rønvik
- Norwegian Cultural Heritage Site
- Type: Church
- Status: Listed
- ID: 84783

Kjerringøy Church (Norwegian: Kjerringøy kirke) is a parish church of the Church of Norway in Bodø Municipality in Nordland county, Norway. It is located in the village of Kjerringøy. It is one of the two churches for the Kjerringøy og Rønvik parish which is part of the Bodø domprosti (deanery) in the Diocese of Sør-Hålogaland. The white, wooden church was built in a long church style in 1883 using plans drawn up by the architect J. E. Olsen. The church seats about 300 people and it has one worship service every three weeks.

== History ==
The earliest existing historical records of the church date back to the year 1589, but the church was not built that year. It may have been built in the 14th or 15th century. In 1763, records show that an old church building was torn down in Kjerringøy and those records show that that church had been built by the residents from "time immemorial". After that, a new timber church was built that had a long church design with a choir and sacristy in the east. There is an existing photograph of this building from around 1860. The nave of this building measured approximately 11 by 6 metres (36 ft × 20 ft) and it had a small tower on the roof on the west end. In 1883, the church was torn down and replaced with the present building.

== Media gallery ==
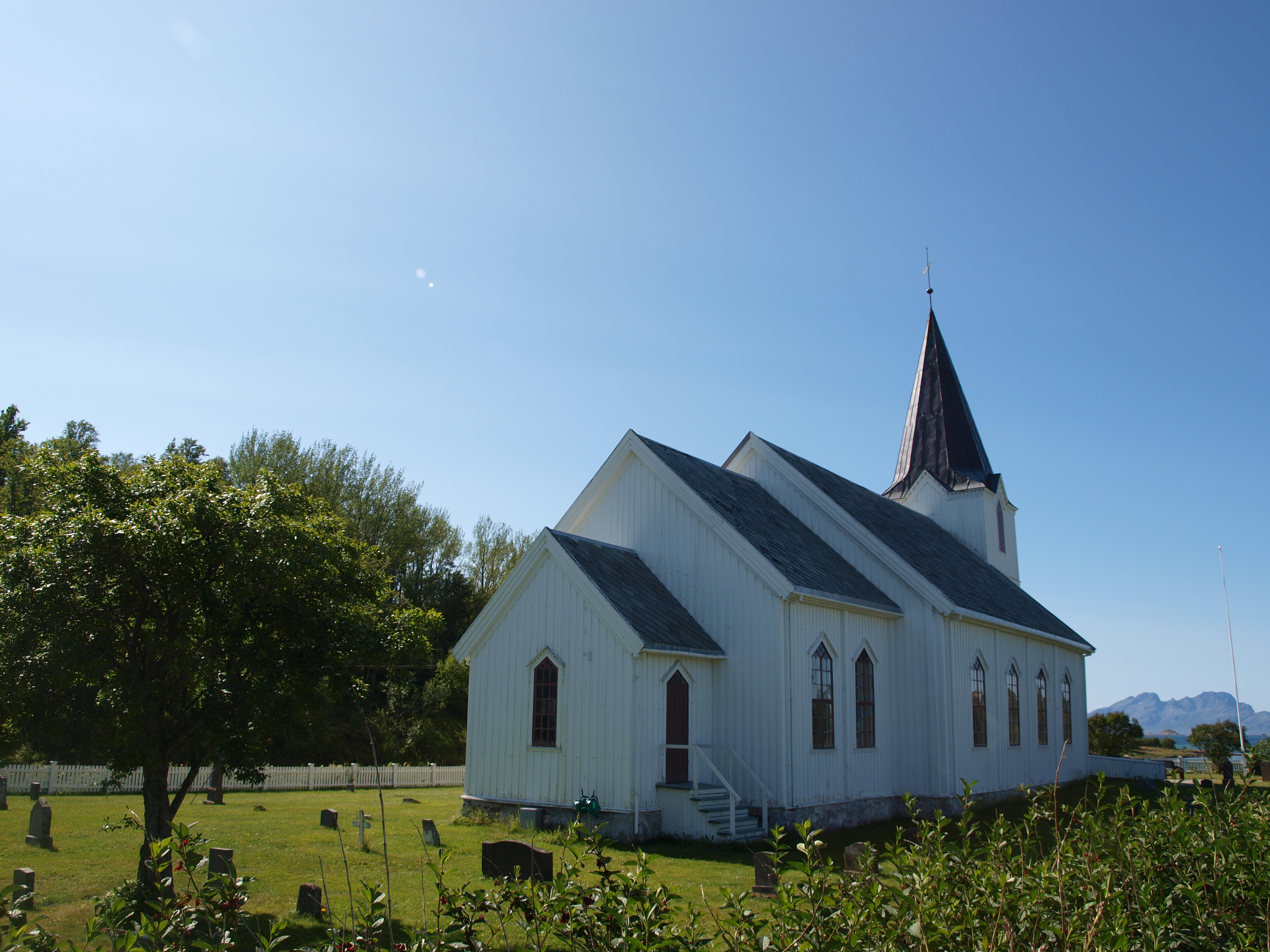

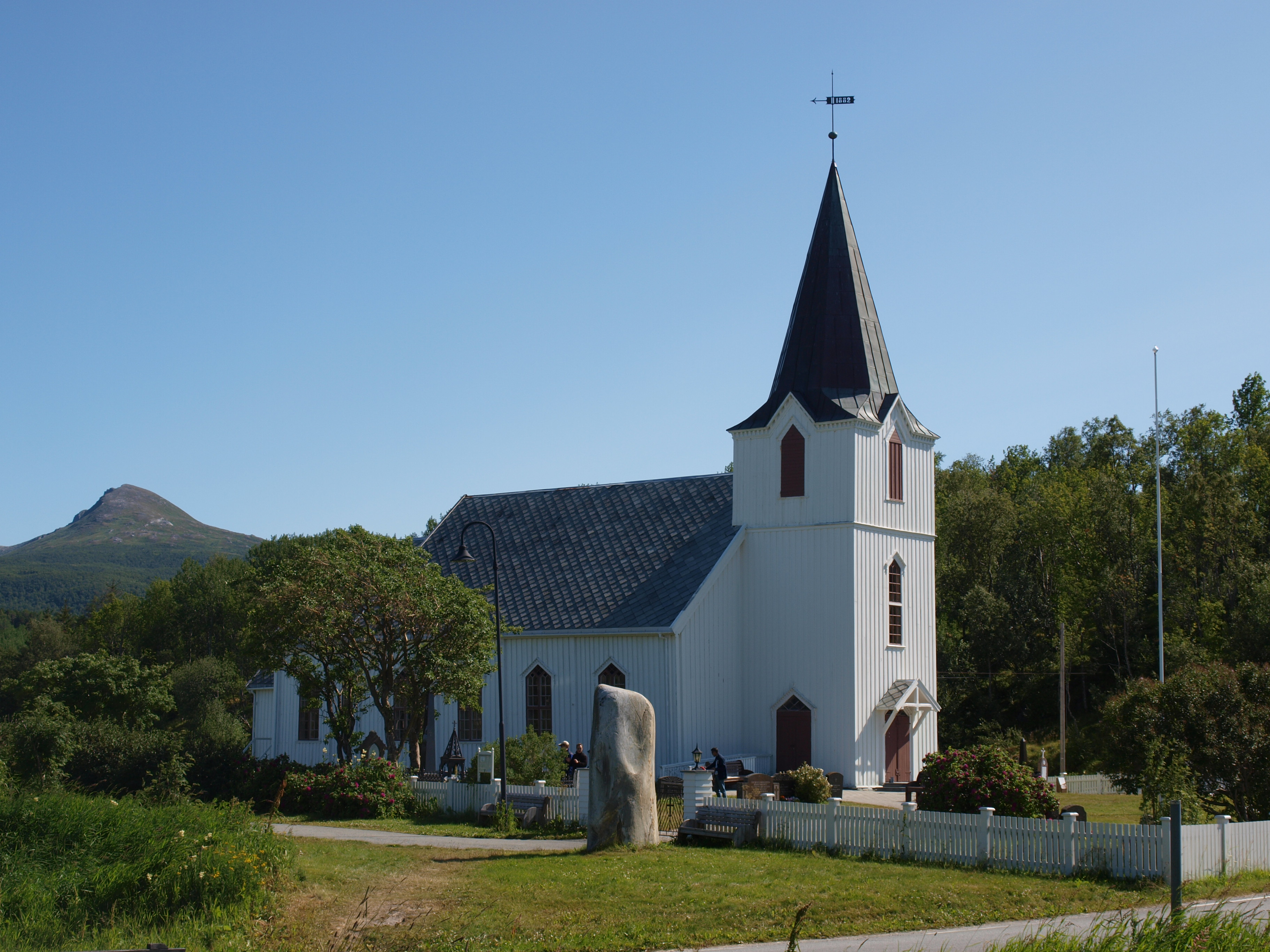

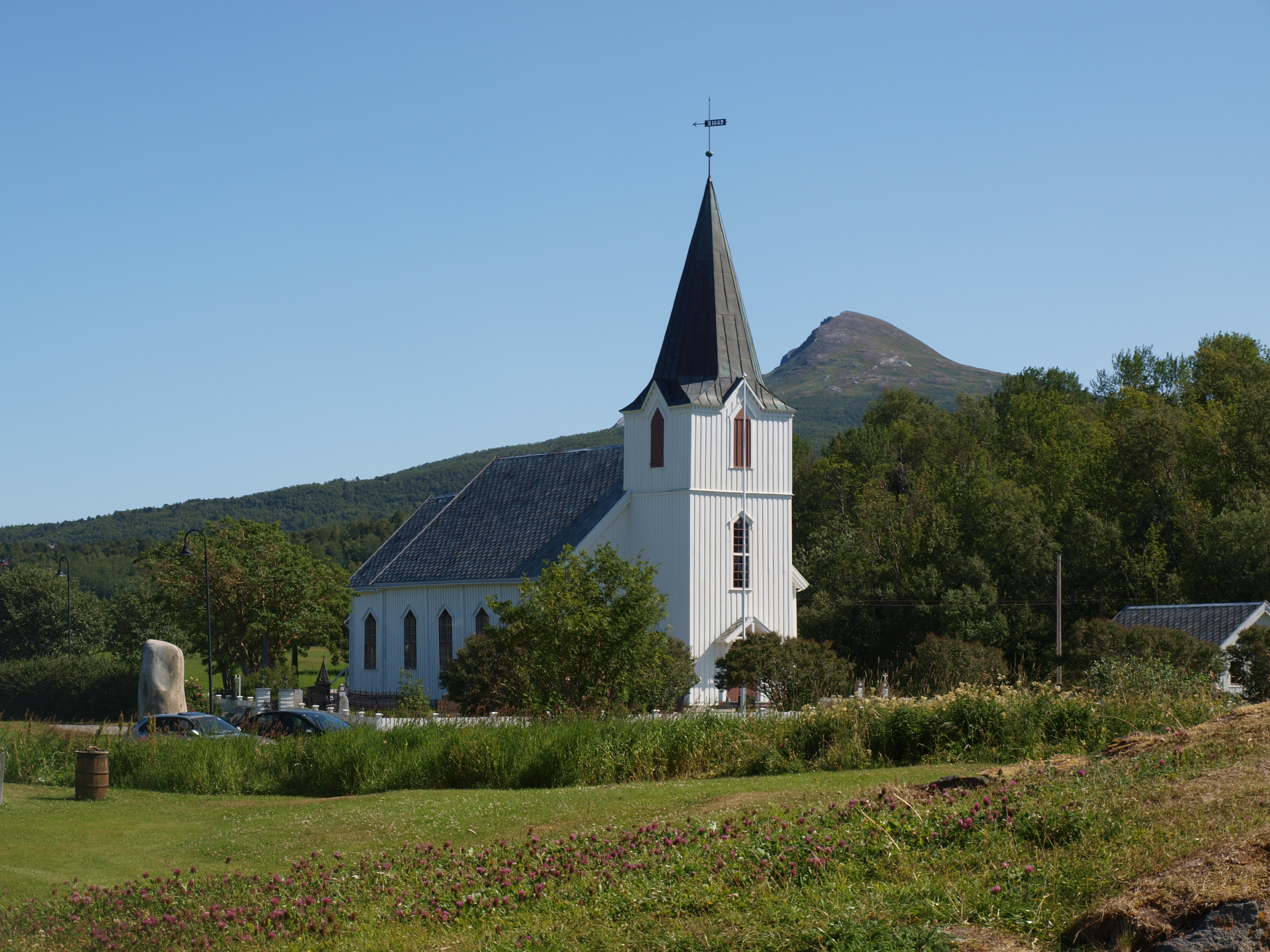

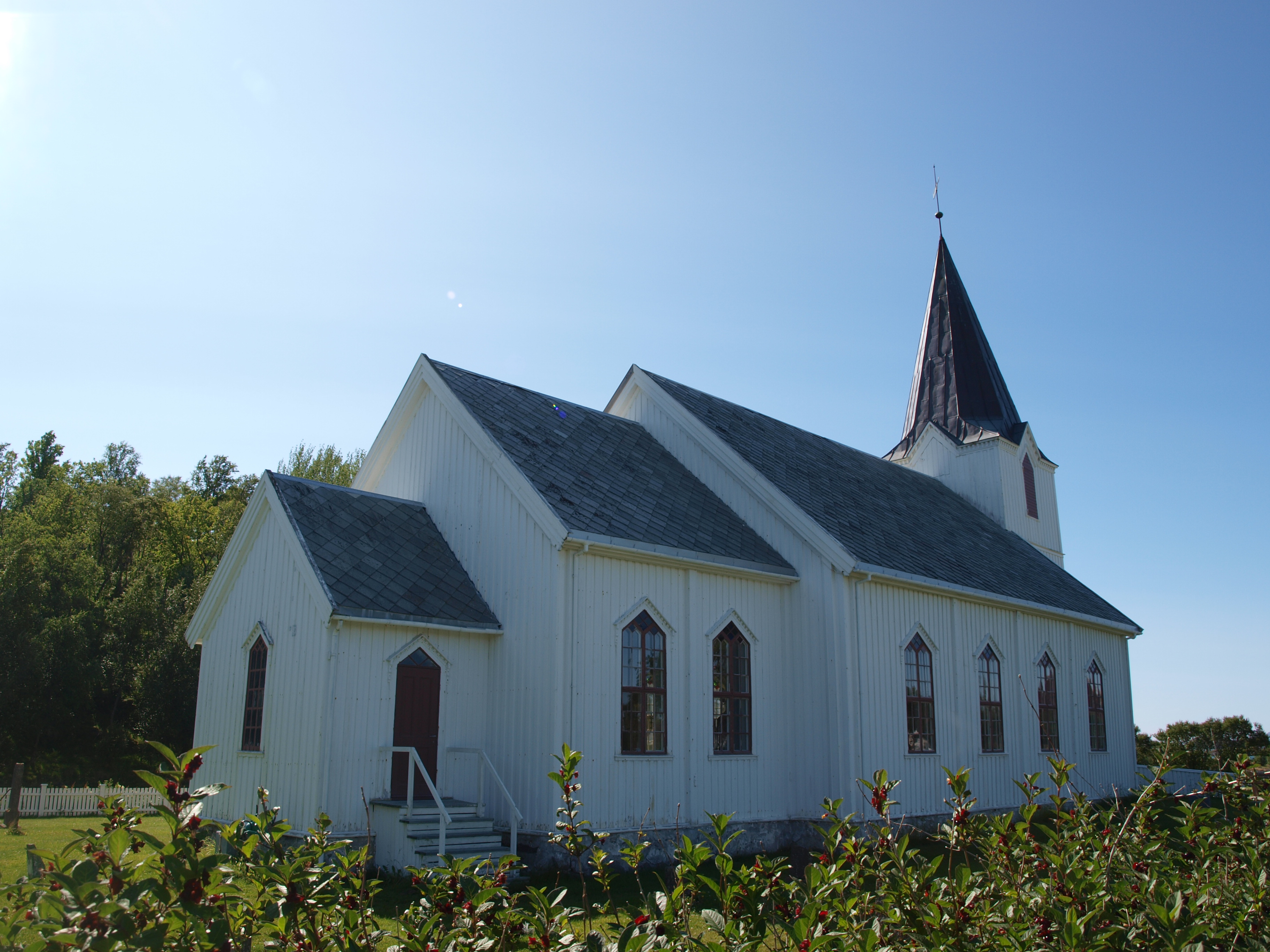

== See also ==
- List of churches in Sør-Hålogaland
