= Erasmus Zahl =

Norwegian businessman (1826–1900)

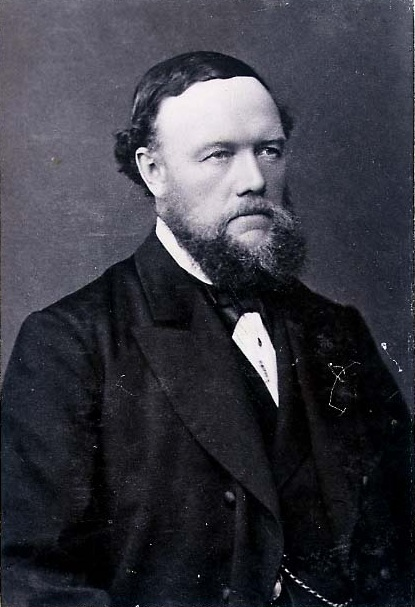
Erasmus B.K. Zahl. Photographer: Mr Finne

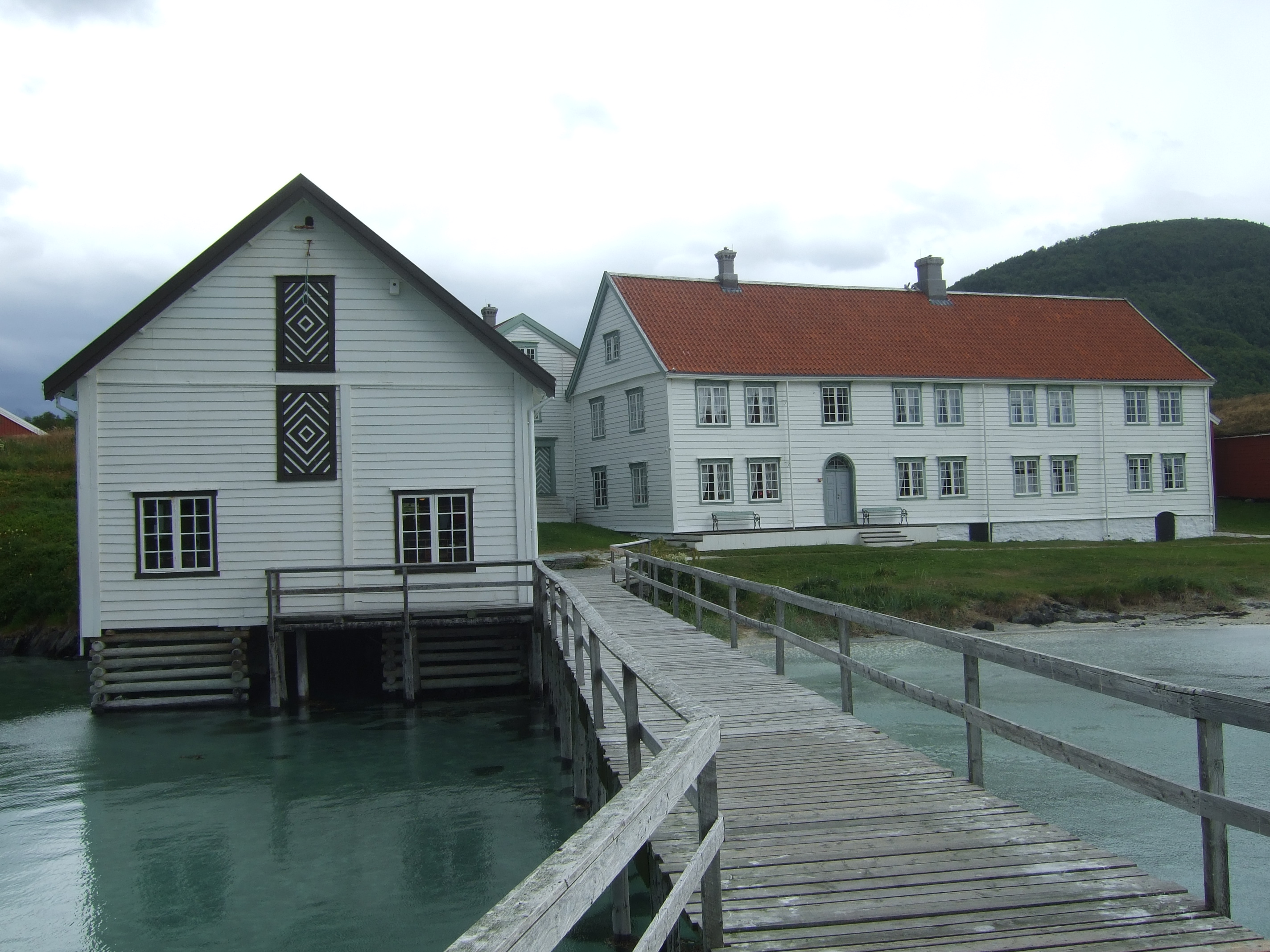
Trade seat of Kjerringøy. Photographer: Harald Groven

Erasmus Benedicter (Benedigt) Kjerschow (Kjerskov) Zahl (19 January 1826 – 29 April 1900) was a privileged trader and an island owner at Kjerringøy in Nordland, Norway. Zahl is known as Nobel Literature Prize laureate Knut Hamsun's monetary supporter, and a representative of the old, traditional Nordland—Hamsun's ideal society. He is also internationally known through the character Mack, who appears in several works of Hamsun, among them Pan (1894), Dreamers (1904), and Benoni and Rosa (1908).

== History ==
=== Tradesman's son in Nordvika ===
Erasmus Zahl was born in 1826 in Nordvika (near Solfjellsjøen on the island of Dønna, where his father Hans Hansen Zahl was a tradesman. His paternal grandparents were tradesman Hans Olsen Zahl and Anne Margrethe, née Zahl in Nordvika. His mother was Anne Sophie Samuelsdatter Budde, a daughter of priest Lord Samuel Jensen Budde and Nicoline Marie Nicolaisdatter Tombsen.

=== Tradesman in Kjerringøy ===
In 1840–50, Erasmus Zahl came to Kjerringøy, where he met and married tradesman Jens Nicolai Ellingsen's widow, Anna Elisabeth née Sverdrup. Thereby, he became the owner of Kjerringøy. It was during Zahl's time in Kjerringøy that the trade seat reached its ultimate wealth. Many economically good years, hereunder the herring fishery between 1865 and 1876, led to Zahl increasing his fortune with 156,000 speciedaler to 265,000 speciedaler.

Anna Ellingsen Zahl died in 1879, after she, at the age of 78 years, fell down one of the main building's stairs. As a widower, Zahl introduced several changes at the trade seat. All sale of alcohol was ended, and nor should alcohol be enjoyed together with meals. Zahl let today's church in Kjerringøy be built, finished in 1883.

Erasmus Zahl died in 1900 of apoplectic stroke. He had no children.

== Mack ==
In the late 1800s, Erasmus Zahl gave monetary support to Knut Hamsun as a young and poor author. Later, 1920 Nobel Literature Prize laureate Hamsun used Zahl as a model for the character Mack appearing in many of his novels, among others Pan (1894), Dreamers (1904), and Benoni and Rosa (1908).

The society in Nordland went through major changes during the late 1800s and the early 1900s. Traditions were challenged by modern ideas, and the social hierarchy, in which Zahl had a leading position, would gradually be changed due to factors like industrialisation and urbanisation. Hamsun was, as expressed in his literature, a defender of this old society. For example, in the double novel Benoni and Rosa, Hamsun describes the self-made man of the people Benoni Hartvigsen with ironical distance but at the same time also with considerable sympathy.

== Ancestry ==
Ancestors of Erasmus Zahl

16. Hans Olsson
8. Ole Hansson
17. Barbro Sjursdotter
4. Hans Olsen Zahl; tradesman
18.
9. Anne Margrethe Zahl
19.
2. Hans Hansen Zahl; tradesman
20.
10.
21.
5. Martha Jensdatter Zahl
22.
11.
23.
1. Erasmus Zahl
24.
12. Jens de Budde; captain
25.
6. Lord Samuel Jensen Budde; priest
26. Lord Jacob Christensen Hersleb; priest
13. Anne Sophie Jacobsdatter Hersleb
27. Aarsille Pedersdatter Strømer
3. Anne Sophie Samuelsdatter Budde
28.
14. Nicolai Bernhard Tombsen; major
29.
7. Nicoline Marie Nicolaisdatter Tombsen
30.
15.
31.

== See also ==
- Zahl (Norwegian family)
- Aristocracy of Norway

== Literature ==
- NRK.no: Nordland fylkesleksikon: Zahl på Kjerringøy
- Store norske leksikon: Kjerringøy handelssted
- Norsk biografisk leksikon: Knut Hamsun – utdypning
