= Nordfold Church =

Church in Nordland, Norway

- Nordfold kirke
- Nordfold Church
- 67.76109933°N 15.2272029°E
- Location: Steigen Municipality, Nordland
- Country: Norway
- Denomination: Church of Norway
- Churchmanship: Evangelical Lutheran

History
- Status: Parish church
- Founded: 1884
- Consecrated: 3 Oct 1976

Architecture
- Functional status: Active
- Architect: Tor G. Dahlstrøm
- Architectural type: Rectangular
- Completed: 1976 (50 years ago)

Specifications
- Capacity: 260
- Materials: Wood/Brick

Administration
- Diocese: Sør-Hålogaland
- Deanery: Salten prosti
- Parish: Nordfold
- Norwegian Cultural Heritage Site
- Type: Church
- Status: Not protected
- ID: 85152

Nordfold Church (Norwegian: Nordfold kirke) is a parish church of the Church of Norway in Steigen Municipality in Nordland county, Norway. It is located in the village of Nordfold. It is the church for the Nordfold parish which is part of the Salten prosti (deanery) in the Diocese of Sør-Hålogaland. The wood and brick church was built in a rectangular style in 1976 using plans drawn up by the architect Tor G. Dahlstrøm. The church seats up to about 260 people.

== History ==
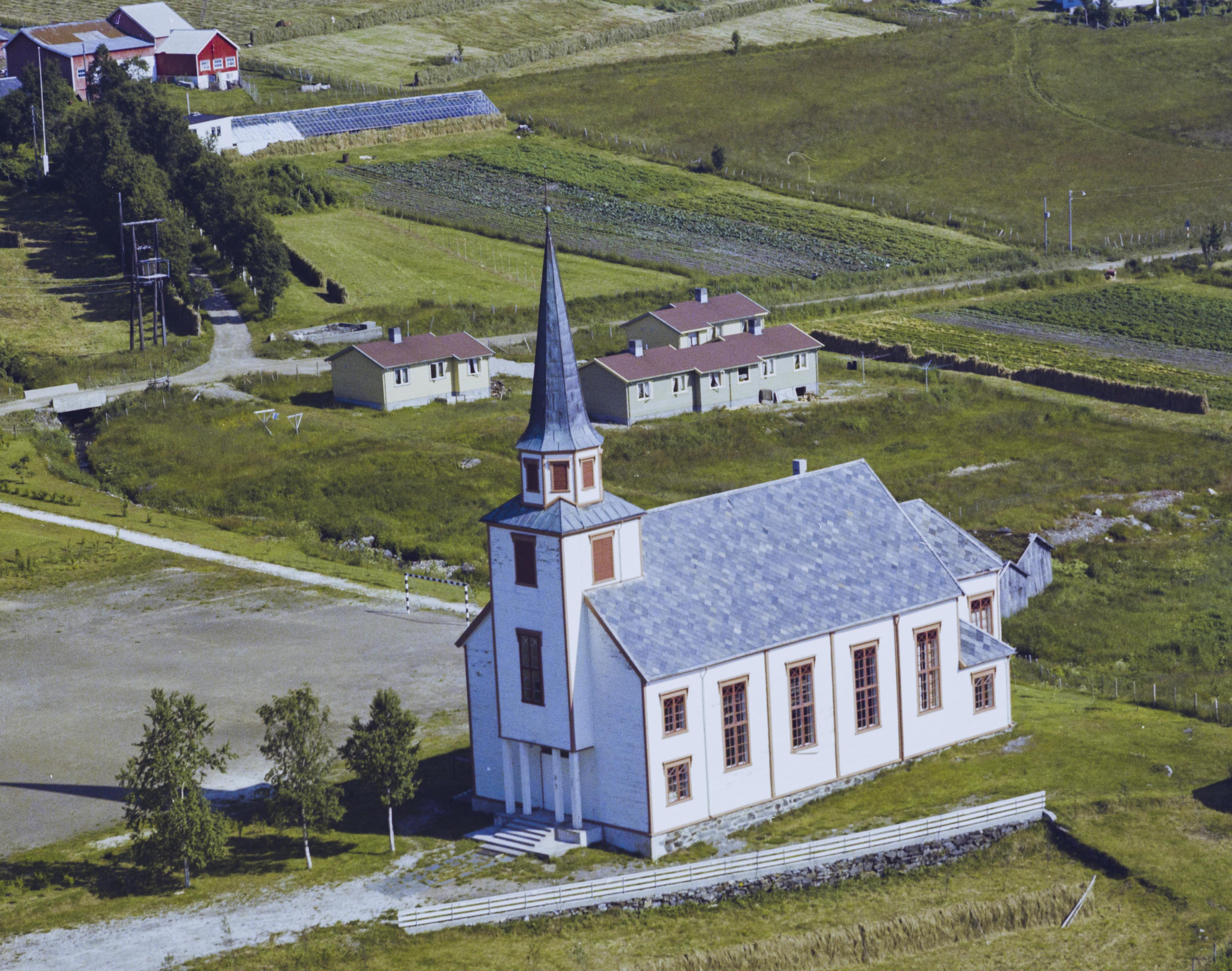
View of the old church from 1884-1975

The first church in Nordfold was built in 1884, after about 20 years of the residents trying to get one. Jens Olsen from Hemnes Municipality was the lead builder. On 30 September 1884, the church was consecrated by the Bishop Jacob Sverdrup Smitt. That church seated about 400 people. A major renovation was completed on the church in 1973. On the night of 4 January 1975, a fire broke out in the church after it was struck by lightning, and the church burned down. The silver from the altarpiece and the baptismal font were saved from the old church and the church bell was salvaged after the fire. A new church on the same site was completed soon after, and on 3 October 1976, the new church building was consecrated by the Bishop Bjarne Odd Weider.

== See also ==
- List of churches in Sør-Hålogaland
