= Sofus Arctander =

Norwegian politician

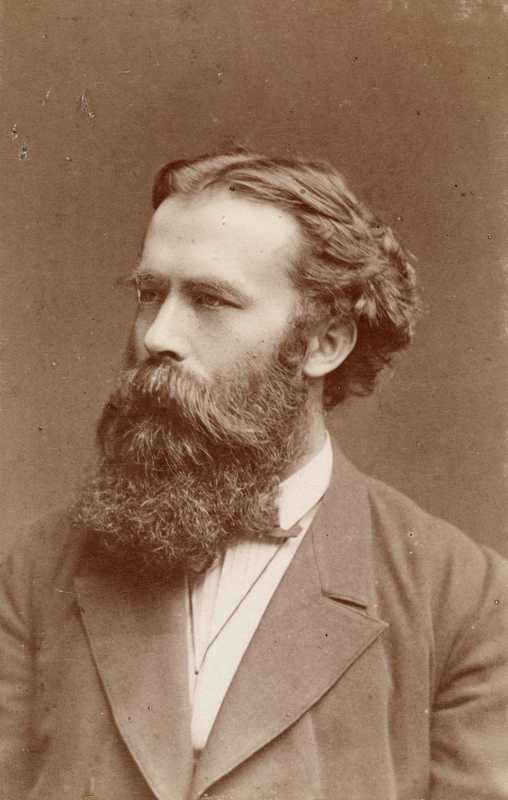

Minister of Trade
- In office 2 February 1910 – 11 June 1910
- Prime Minister: Wollert Konow
- Preceded by: Lars Abrahamsen
- Succeeded by: Bernhard Brænne
- In office 11 March 1905 – 19 March 1908
- Prime Minister: Christian Michelsen; Jørgen Løvland
- Preceded by: Paul B. Vogt
- Succeeded by: Lars Abrahamsen

Prime Minister of Norway Acting
- In office 31 August 1905 – 23 September 1905
- Prime Minister: Christian Michelsen
- Preceded by: Christian Michelsen
- Succeeded by: Christian Michelsen

Minister of the Interior
- In office 15 August 1886 – 17 February 1888
- Prime Minister: Johan Sverdrup
- Preceded by: Jacob Stang
- Succeeded by: Walter Scott Dahl
- In office 26 June 1884 – 15 August 1885
- Prime Minister: Johan Sverdrup
- Preceded by: Thomas Cathinco Bang
- Succeeded by: Jacob Stang

Personal details
- Born: Sofus Anton Birger Arctander; 22 January 1845 Christiania, United Kingdoms of Sweden and Norway
- Died: 20 August 1924 (aged 79) Lifjell, Telemark, Norway
- Party: Liberal; Free-minded Liberal
- Spouse: Maren Sophie Aars (m. 1881)
- Children: Signy Arctander

Sofus Anton Birger Arctander (22 January 1845 – 20 August 1924) was a politician with the Liberal Party who served as acting Prime Minister of Norway during 1905.

== Background ==
Sofus Arctander was born in Christiania (now Oslo), Norway. He was the son of Hans Steenbuch Arctander (1801-1885) and Martha Dahll Nielsen (1804-1896). When he was eight years old, his family moved to Kristiansand in Lister og Mandal county. He was a teacher and librarian in Selje Municipality and Eid Municipality. He received a law degree from the University of Christiania in 1870, then studied economy and philosophy at the University of Lund in 1871.

Arctander lived at Hadsel Municipality in Nordland county (1872-1884). He was deputy judge and then acting district stipendiary magistrate before establishing himself as a lawyer in 1875. In 1880 he became bailiff in Hadsel.

== Political career ==
In 1877, Arctander was elected deputy Member of the Parliament of Norway for the County of Nordland. From 1880 to 1884 he was a permanent member. He participated actively in the founding of the Liberal Party in 1882. Arctander was re-elected to Parliament for the period 1889-1891 and 1900-1906. He subsequently become mayor of Kristiania 1908-1920.

He was Minister of the Interior 1884–1885, Norwegian state secretary in Stockholm 1885–1886, Minister of the Interior 1886-1888, Norwegian Minister of Trade 1905–1907, acting Prime Minister 1905 and Minister of Trade 1907–1908 and 1910.

== Personal life ==
In 1887, he was promoted to Commander with Star (Commander 1st Class) of the Order of St. Olav. Arctander also was appointed a Grand Cross of the Order of Dannebrog (Denmark) and a Commander Grand Cross of the Order of the Polar Star (Sweden). He was an honorary member and co-founder of the Nordlendingenes Forening, an association of people who have emigrated from the counties in Northern Norway. In 1912 he was awarded the Petter Dass Medal (Petter Dass-medaljen). Arctander died in the Lifjell Mountains of Telemark one day in August 1924, the exact date uncertain. He had been missing for some days when he was found dead.

He was married in 1881 with Maren Sophie Aars (1849-1940), daughter of Jens Ludvig Aars (1808-1855) and Annette Lund (1818-1855). They were the parents of Signy Arctander.

== Other sources ==
- "Det norske statsråd 1814-: III Personer 1814-". Government.no. Archived from the original on 2010-01-25.
