= Kjerringøy =

Village in Bodø Municipality, Norway

- Village
- Interactive map of Kjerringøy
- Location within Nordland Location within Norway
- Coordinates: 67.5195°N 14.7643°E
- Country: Norway
- Region: Northern Norway
- County: Nordland
- District: Salten
- Municipality: Bodø Municipality
- Elevation: 11 m (36 ft)
- Time zone: UTC+01:00 (CET)
  - Summer (DST): UTC+02:00 (CEST)
- Post Code: 8093 Kjerringøy

Kjerringøy is a village in Bodø Municipality in Nordland county, Norway. The village is located about 30 kilometres (19 mi) north of the town of Bodø, along the Karlsøyfjorden, just south of the entrance to the Folda fjord. The Kjerringøy Church is located in the village.

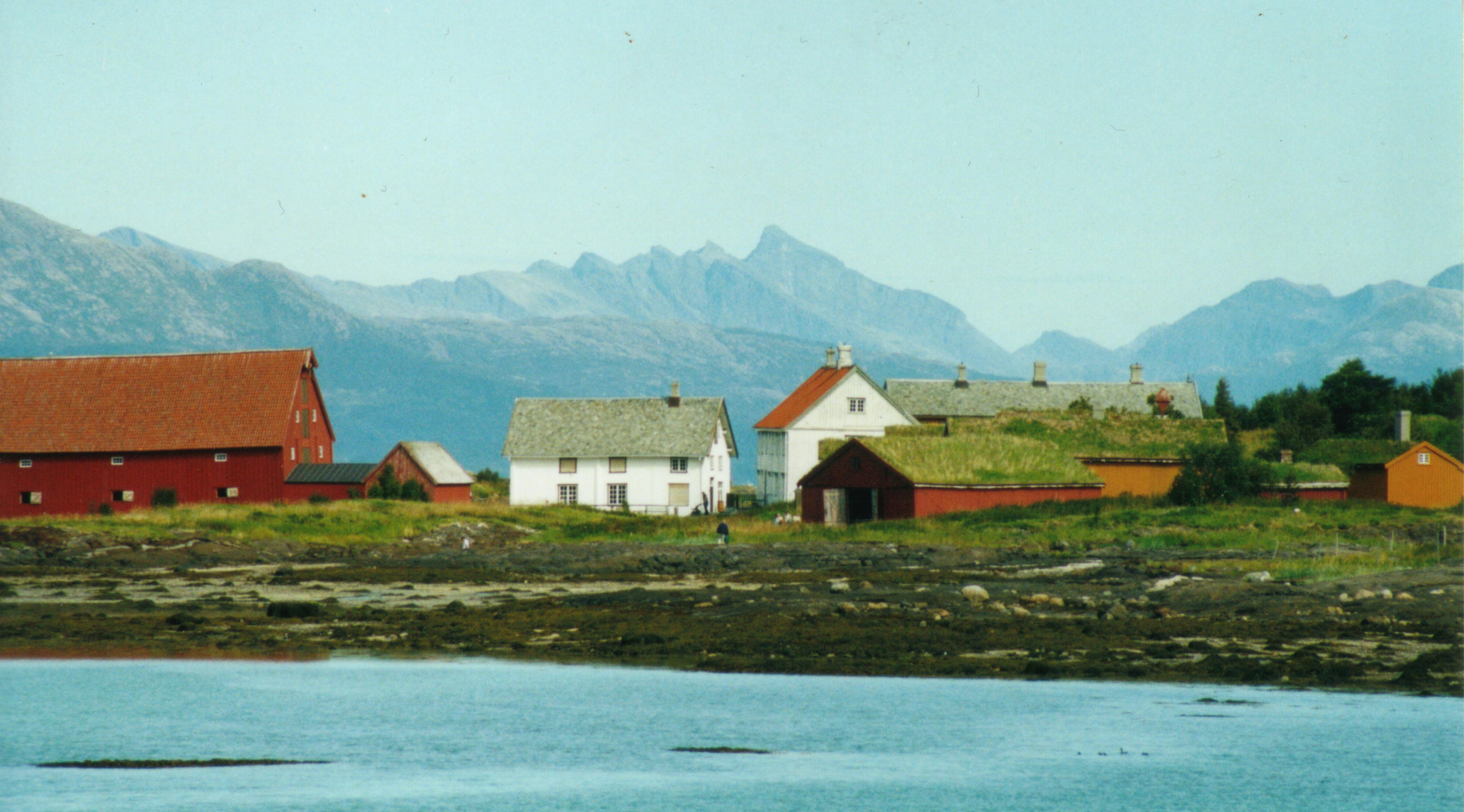
Kjerringøy trading post

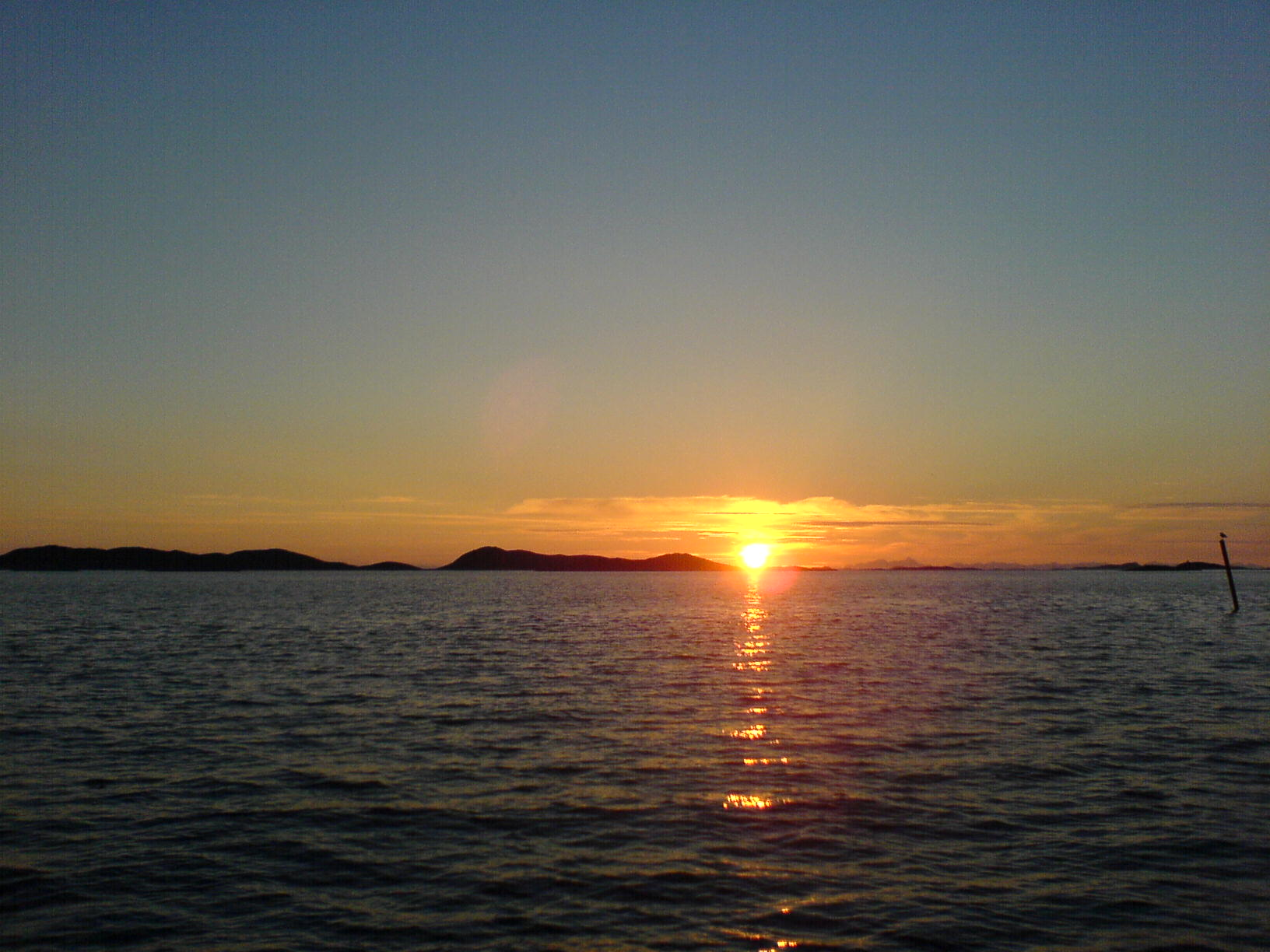
sunset in Kjerringøy

The Kjerringøy trading post, a part of the Nordland Museum, is located in the village. The trading post is well-preserved, with around 15 authentic buildings with interior. It is a popular tourist destination and is often used as a location for movies.

Historically, the village was the administrative centre of the old Kjerringøy Municipality which existed from 1906 until 1964.
