= Nordland Museum =

Museum in Bodø, Norway

Coordinates: 67.2819°N 14.3823°E

Nordlandsmuseet
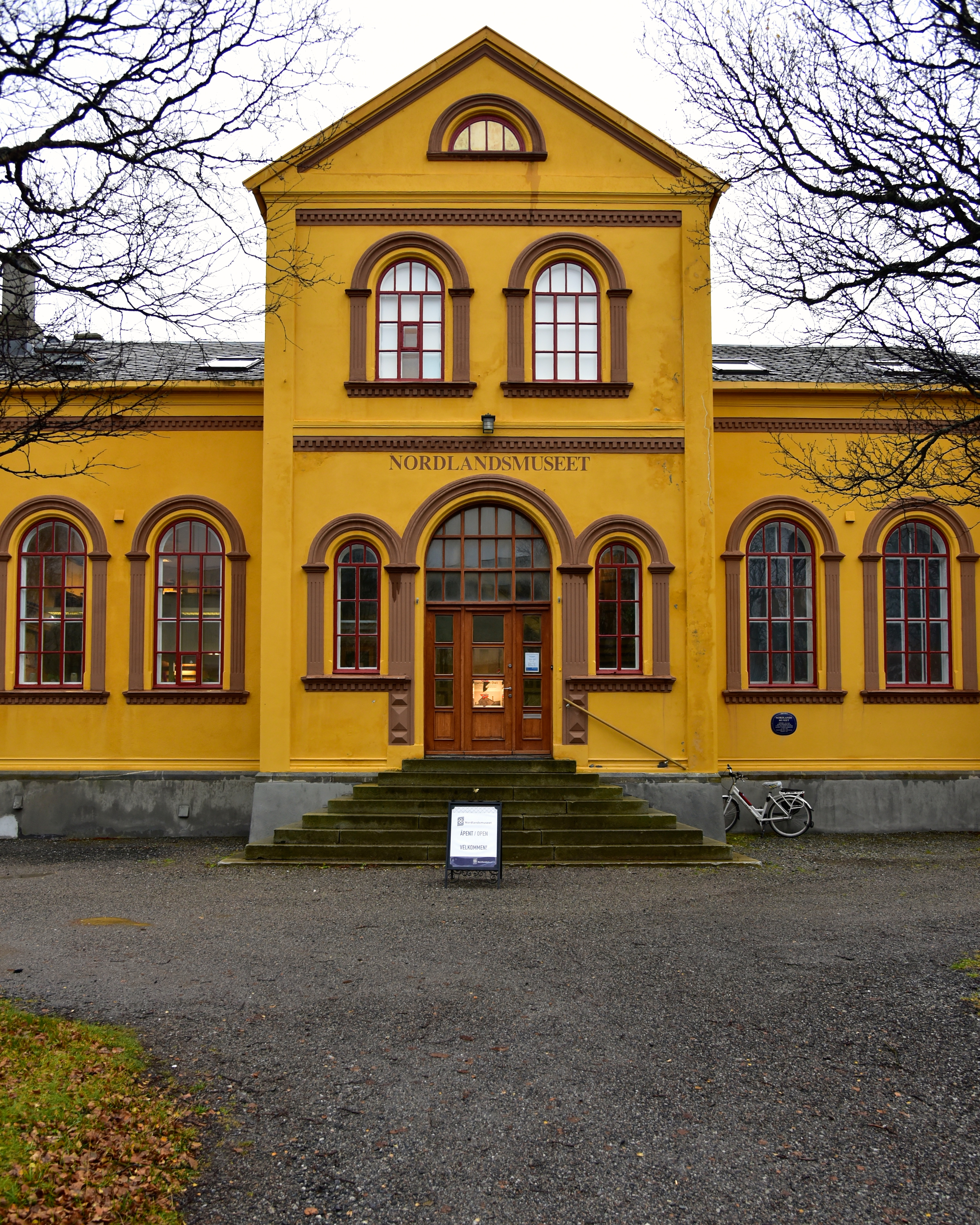
- Established: 1888
- Location: Bodø in Nordland, Norway
- Type: Cultural History
- Website: Nordland Museum

Nordland Museum (Norwegian: Nordlandsmuseet) is a museum located in the center of Bodø in Nordland, Norway. The museum is a central part of a larger consortium of 18 museum units in nine municipalities with the county of Nordland.

== Background ==
The museum was established in 1888 as the Bodø Fisheries Museum (Bodø Fiskerimuseum). The majority of the museum's collections were destroyed during World War II when the museum was hit by two bombs on May 27, 1940. The museum building was also stripped of its function as a museum during the war, when it housed the Nasjonal Samling, a Norwegian fascist party active from 1933 to 1945. The museum has since regained its function as a museum and houses today several exhibitions that cover Northern Norwegian culture and history.

== Collections ==
The main building was designed by engineer Ole Aarnseth and built in 1903. The museum building has been preserved by the Norwegian Directorate for Cultural Heritage. The museum houses an interactive dry fish aquarium exhibition from the mid 1950s, which has also been persevered by the Norwegian Directorate for Cultural Heritage.

On the first floor the museum has two exhibits: one about the Lofoten fisheries and the international stockfish trade with the Hanseatic League, and a second covering the local Sami people. Most of the Sami material on display is from Tysfjord Municipality, north of Bodø.

The exhibition on the second floor shows a silver treasure from the Viking Age. This treasure was found in Bodø in 1919 and is one of the biggest that has been found in Northern Norway. The treasure consists of silver jewellery and silver pieces, among them Anglo-Saxon and Arabic coins. The largest silver piece, a silver decorative needle for fastening capes, was part of a larger international exhibition. Vikings: Life and Legend was a collaboration between the British Museum, the National Museum of Denmark and the Berlin State Museums which focused on the core period of the Vikings from the late 8th century to the early 11th century.

The third floor shows an exhibit about the history of Bodø from the founding in 1816 to the present. Central to the exhibit is the destruction of the old town during the German occupation of Norway, a dramatic highpoint in the town history. The exhibition also contains a 25-minute documentary with English subtitles about the town's older history (1816-1940).

== Related reading ==
- Williams, Gareth; Pentz, Peter; Wemhoff, Matthias, eds. (2014). Vikings: Life and Legend. Cornell University Press. ISBN 9780801479427.
