= Folden Municipality =

Former municipality in Nordland, Norway

Folden Municipality Folden herred
- Former municipality
- Nordland within Norway

- Folden within Nordland
- Coordinates: 67°37′26″N 15°16′45″E
- Country: Norway
- County: Nordland
- District: Salten
- Established: 1 Jan 1838
  - Created as: Formannskapsdistrikt
- Disestablished: 1 Jan 1887
  - Succeeded by: Nordfolden-Kjerringø Municipality and Sørfold Municipality
- Administrative centre: Rørstad

Government
  - Mayor (1885-1886): Lars Johnsen Wormdahl

Area (upon dissolution)
  - Total: 2,271 km^{2} (877 sq mi)
- Highest elevation: 1,663.6 m (5,458 ft)

Population (1887)
  - Total: 3,293
  - Density: 1.450/km^{2} (3.756/sq mi)
- Demonym: Foldværing
- Time zone: UTC+01:00 (CET)
  - Summer (DST): UTC+02:00 (CEST)
- ISO 3166 code: NO-1845

Folden is a former municipality in Nordland county, Norway. The 2,271-square-kilometre (877 sq mi) municipality existed from 1838 until its dissolution in 1887. Folden encompassed all of the areas surrounding the Folda fjord and all of the fjord branches that connect to the main fjord. It included all the areas in what is now Sørfold Municipality, plus the Kjerringøy area of Bodø Municipality, and the southeastern part of the Steigen Municipality. The administrative centre was the small village of Rørstad, where the old Rørstad Church is located.

== General information ==
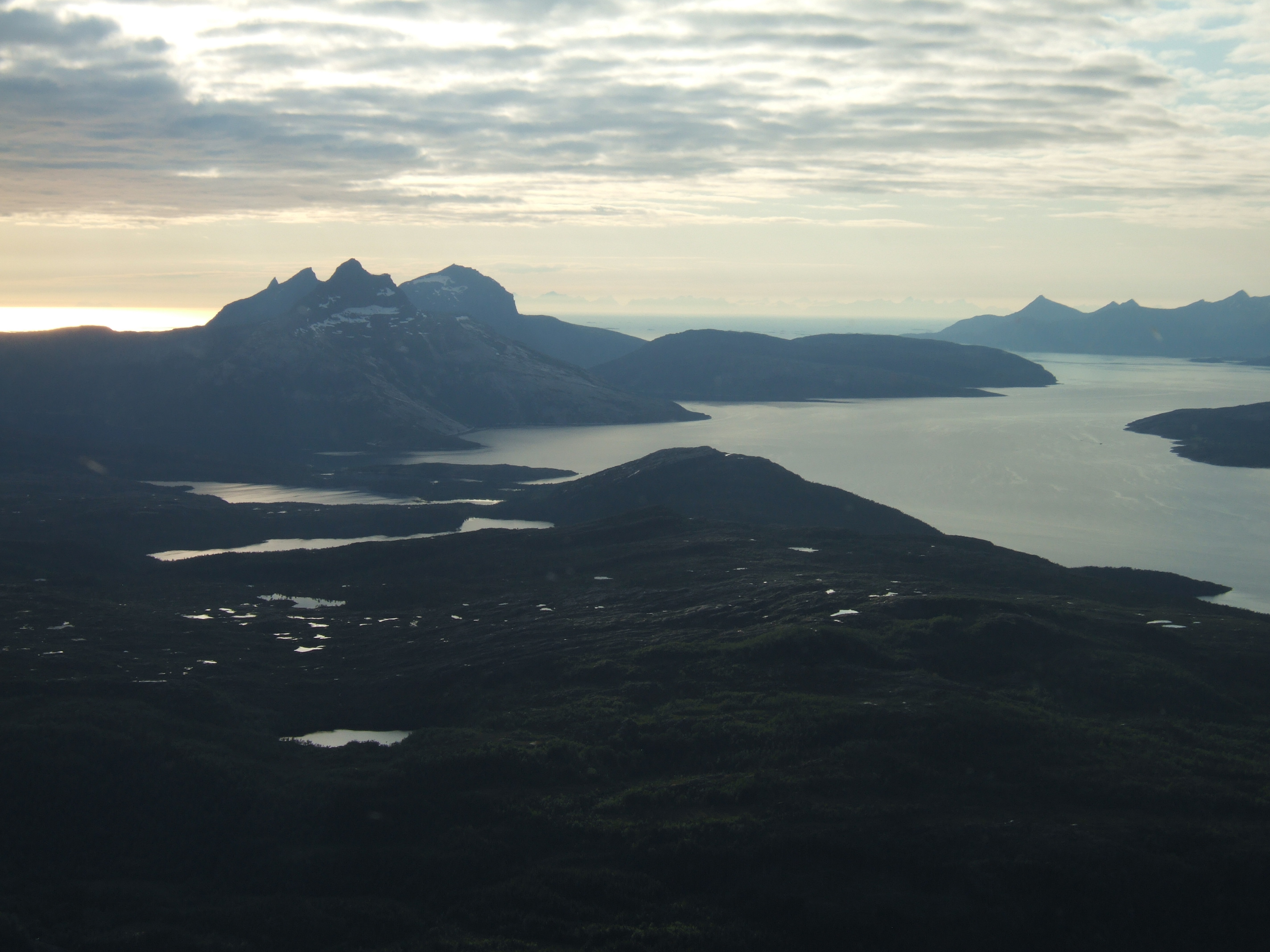
View of the Folda fjord.

The municipality of Folden was established on 1 January 1838 (see formannskapsdistrikt law). The municipality existed until 1 January 1887, when it was divided into two new municipalities: Nordfolden-Kjerringø Municipality and Sørfold Municipality. Before the partition, Folden had a population of 3,293.

=== Name ===
The municipality is named after the local Folda fjord (Old Norse: Fold). The name is derived from the word fold which probably means "broad" or "wide" referring to the width of the fjord. The outer part of the fjord is usually what is referred to as the Folda fjord, while the inner part of the fjord is divided into two arms Nordfolda ("the northern Folda") and Sørfolda ("the southern Folda").

=== Churches ===
The Church of Norway had one parish (sokn) within Folden Municipality. At the time of the municipal dissolution, it was part of the Folden prestegjeld and the Søndre Salten prosti (deanery) in the Diocese of Sør-Hålogaland.

Churches in Folden Municipality
Parish (sokn)	Church name	Location of the church	Year built
Folden	Nordfold Church	Nordfold	1884
Folden	Kjerringøy Church	Kjerringøy	1883
Folden	Rørstad Church	Rørstad	1761
Folden	Røsvik Church	Røsvika	1883

== Geography ==
The municipality was quite large, stretching from the mountainous border with Sweden to the open ocean in the west. The highest point in the municipality was the 1,663.6-metre (5,458 ft) tall mountain Skagmatoppen, on the border with Sweden. Steigen Municipality was to the northwest, Hamarøy Municipality was to the north, Jokkmokk Municipality in Sweden was to the east, and Fauske Municipality and Bodin Municipality were to the south.

== Government ==
During its existence, Folden Municipality was governed by a municipal council of directly elected representatives. The mayor is indirectly elected by a vote of the municipal council.

=== Mayors ===
The mayor (Norwegian: ordfører) of Folden Municipality was the political leader of the municipality and the chairperson of the municipal council. Here is a list of people who held this position:

- 1838–1843: Jørgen Meyer Heffermehl
- 1843–1844: Søren Normann
- 1844–1850: Georg Taylor Faye
- 1851–1851: Gunder Enevoldsen
- 1852–1856: Torer Hemsen
- 1856–1862: Anders Andersen Alvenes
- 1863–1864: Søren Normann
- 1865–1868: Alexander Lagaard
- 1869–1872: Arent Paulsen Elenjord
- 1873–1878: Peder Benoni Larsen
- 1879–1880: Ernst Kristian Gladsjø
- 1881–1882: Petter Hansen
- 1883–1884: Henrik Normann
- 1885–1886: Lars Johnsen Wormdahl

== See also ==
- List of former municipalities of Norway
