= Folden =

Folden may refer to:

== Places ==
- Folden Municipality, a former municipality in Nordland county, Norway
- Folda, Nordland (historically spelled Folden), a fjord in Nordland county, Norway
- Folden Township, Otter Tail County, Minnesota, a township in Otter Tail county in Minnesota, USA

== People ==
- William Folden (born 1972), an American politician
