= Rørstad =

Village in Sørfold Municipality, Norway

- Village
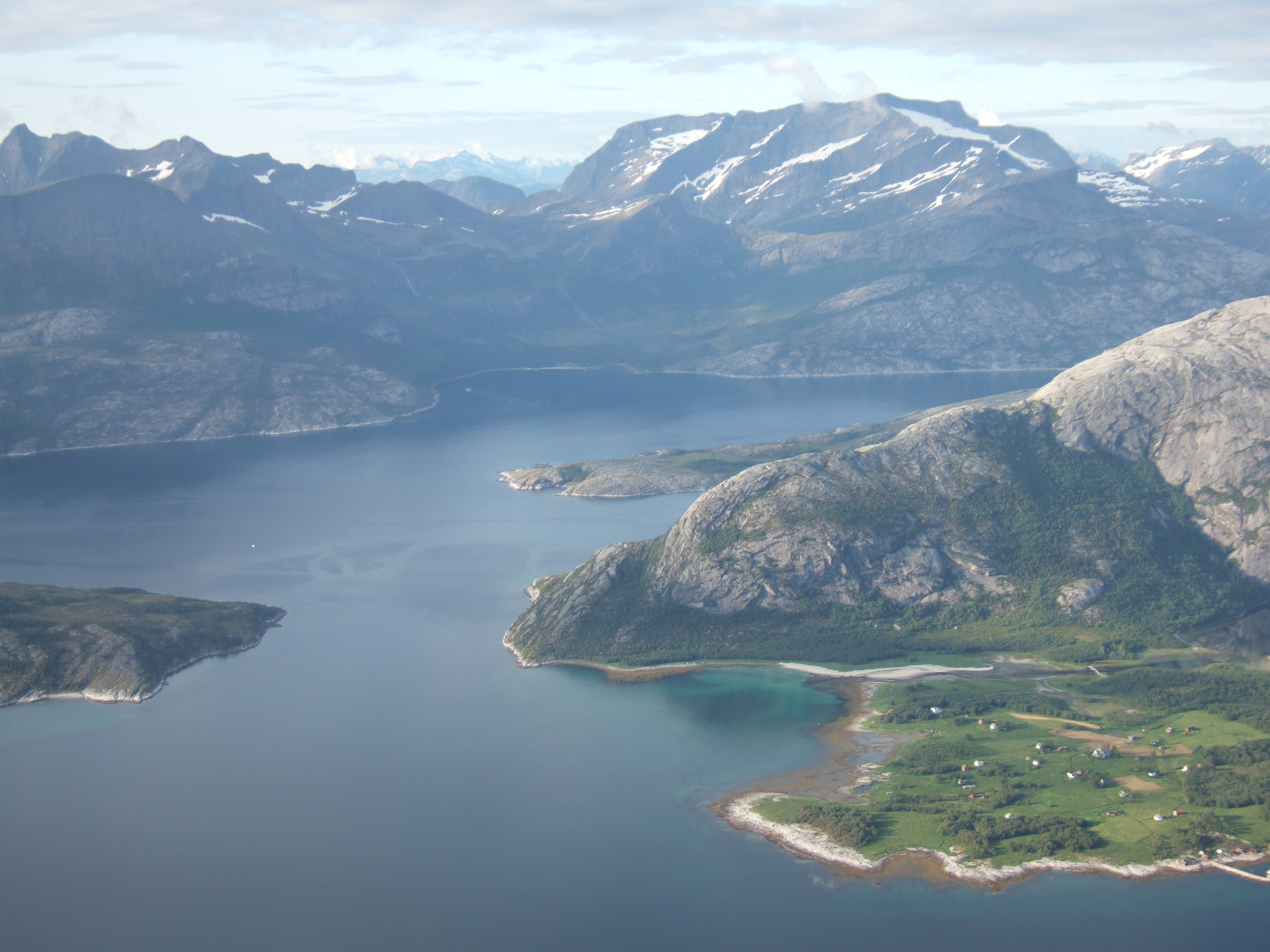
- View of the village
- Interactive map of Rørstad
- Location within Nordland Location within Norway
- Coordinates: 67.5894°N 15.2244°E
- Country: Norway
- Region: Northern Norway
- County: Nordland
- District: Salten
- Municipality: Sørfold Municipality
- Elevation: 7 m (23 ft)
- Time zone: UTC+01:00 (CET)
  - Summer (DST): UTC+02:00 (CEST)
- Post Code: 8220 Røsvik

Rørstad is a village in Sørfold Municipality in Nordland county, Norway. The village is located along the Sørfolda fjord, about 25 kilometres (16 mi) south of the village of Nordfold and about 15 kilometres (9.3 mi) northwest of the village of Røsvika. The historic Rørstad Church is located in the village, and worship services are held there twice each summer. The village area was located on a peninsula lying between the Nordfolda and Sørfolda fjords, just east of the uninhabited island, Prestmåsøya.

== History ==
The site was an important historical location due to the importance of boat transportation. It was the centre of the old Folden Municipality since the Rørstad Church was located in the village. Since boat transportation gave way to automobile transportation in the 20th century, the village became more remote. There are no road connections to Rørstad, but there are ferry connections from Røsvika in the summer. The permanent residents left the village in the late-1970s, but since then the area has been used for summer holiday cottages.
