= Prestmåsøya =

Island in Norway

- Interactive map of Prestmåsøya

Geography
- Location: Nordland, Norway
- Coordinates: 67.6068°N 15.1685°E
- Area: 4.21 km^{2} (1.63 sq mi)
- Length: 3.4 km (2.11 mi)
- Width: 1.7 km (1.06 mi)
- Highest elevation: 255 m (837 ft)

Administration
- Norway
- County: Nordland
- Municipality: Sørfold Municipality

Demographics
- Population: 0

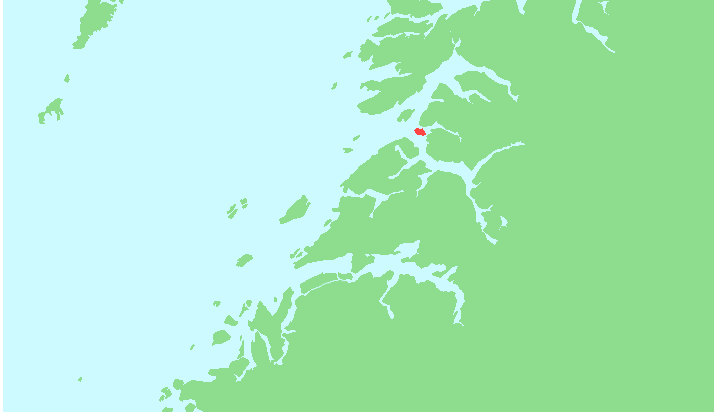

Prestmåsøya is an uninhabited island in Sørfold Municipality in Nordland county, Norway. The 4.21-square-kilometre (1.63 sq mi) island lies at the eastern end of the Folda fjord where it splits into the Nordfolda and Sørfolda. The now-abandoned village of Rørstad lies on the mainland, about 1.5 kilometres (0.93 mi) to the southeast. The island is basically one large rocky, mountain reaching 255 metres (837 ft) above sea level.

== See also ==
- List of islands of Norway
