= Rørstad Church =

Church in Nordland, Norway

- Rørstad kirke
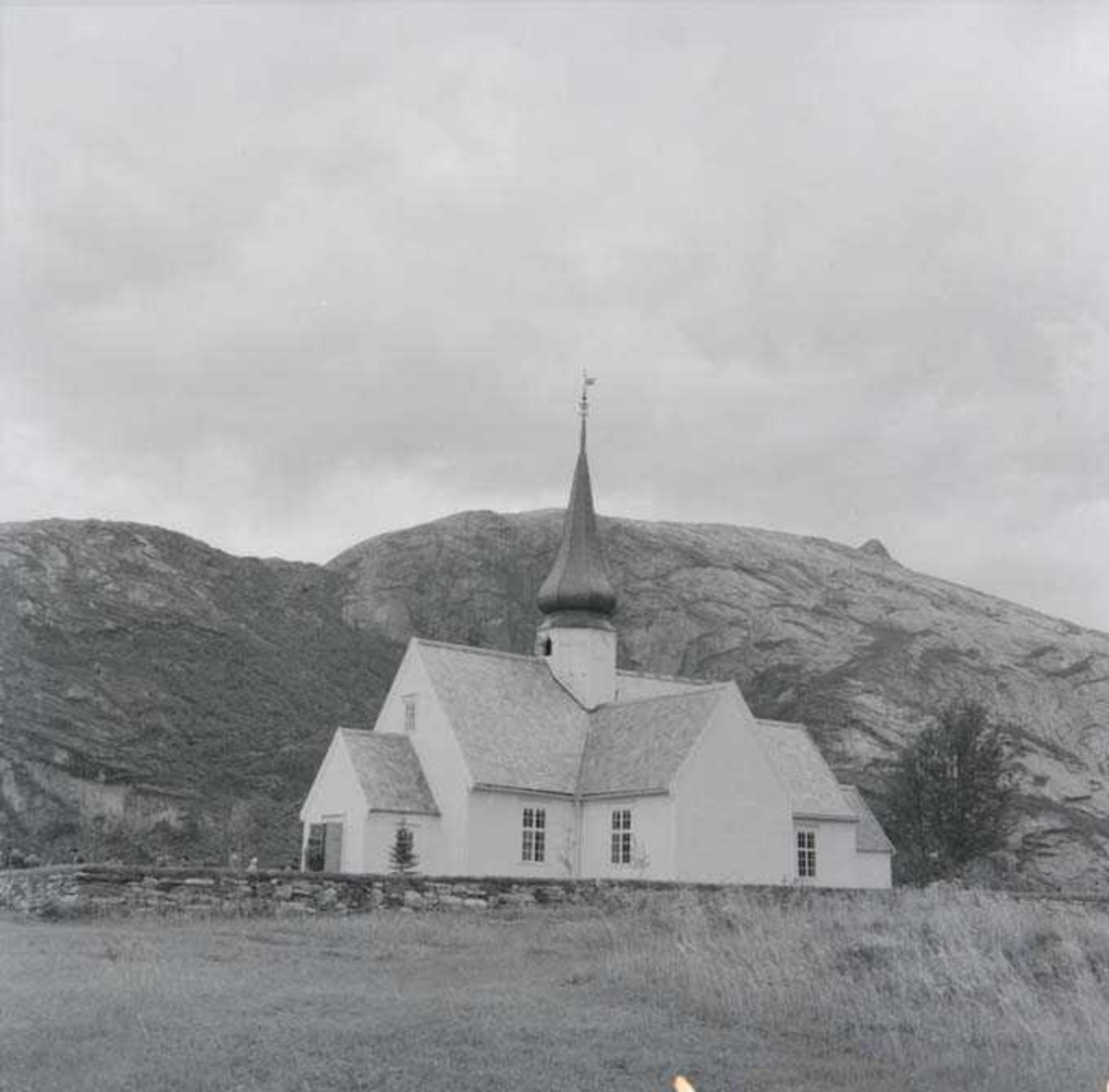
- View of the church
- Rørstad Church
- 67.58926224°N 15.2251625°E
- Location: Sørfold Municipality, Nordland
- Country: Norway
- Denomination: Church of Norway
- Churchmanship: Evangelical Lutheran

History
- Status: Parish church
- Founded: 16th century
- Consecrated: 1761

Architecture
- Functional status: Inactive
- Architectural type: Cruciform
- Completed: 1761 (265 years ago)
- Closed: 1883

Specifications
- Capacity: 300
- Materials: Wood

Administration
- Diocese: Sør-Hålogaland
- Deanery: Salten prosti
- Parish: Sørfold
- Norwegian Cultural Heritage Site
- Type: Church
- Status: Automatically protected
- ID: 85341

Rørstad Church (Norwegian: Rørstad kirke) is a historic parish church of the Church of Norway in Sørfold Municipality in Nordland county, Norway. It is located in the isolated village of Rørstad. It was once the main church for the Sørfold parish which is part of the Salten prosti (deanery) in the Diocese of Sør-Hålogaland. The white, wooden church was built in a cruciform style in 1761 by an unknown architect. The church seats about 300 people.

== History ==
The oldest existing historical record referring to Rørstad Church dates back to 1589, but it was not new that year. In 1661, the church was noted as being in terrible condition and so it was decided that it would be torn down and rebuilt, reusing any salvageable materials from the old building. The new church was consecrated in 1665. The new wooden church was cruciform with a steeple above the centre of the church.

In 1761, a new church was built at Rørstad to serve the whole Sørfold parish. The church was located along the heavily traveled Sørfolda fjord, making it an ideal location for the church for a long time due to the prevalence and ease of boat travel at that time. Nearing the end of the 19th century, however, roads were becoming better and more well-used in Norway and since there was no road to Rørstad, it was decided in 1880 to build a new church along the municipal road system and then close the church and only use it for special occasions.

A new church, Røsvik Church, was built in 1883 in Røsvika to replace the old, isolated church. There are no real permanent residents in Rørstad anymore due to its lack of a road connection to the rest of the municipality. Rørstad is now mostly a collection of summer cottages, so the church no longer used regularly, except for special worship services that are held twice each summer. It has not been regularly used since 1883.

== Media gallery ==
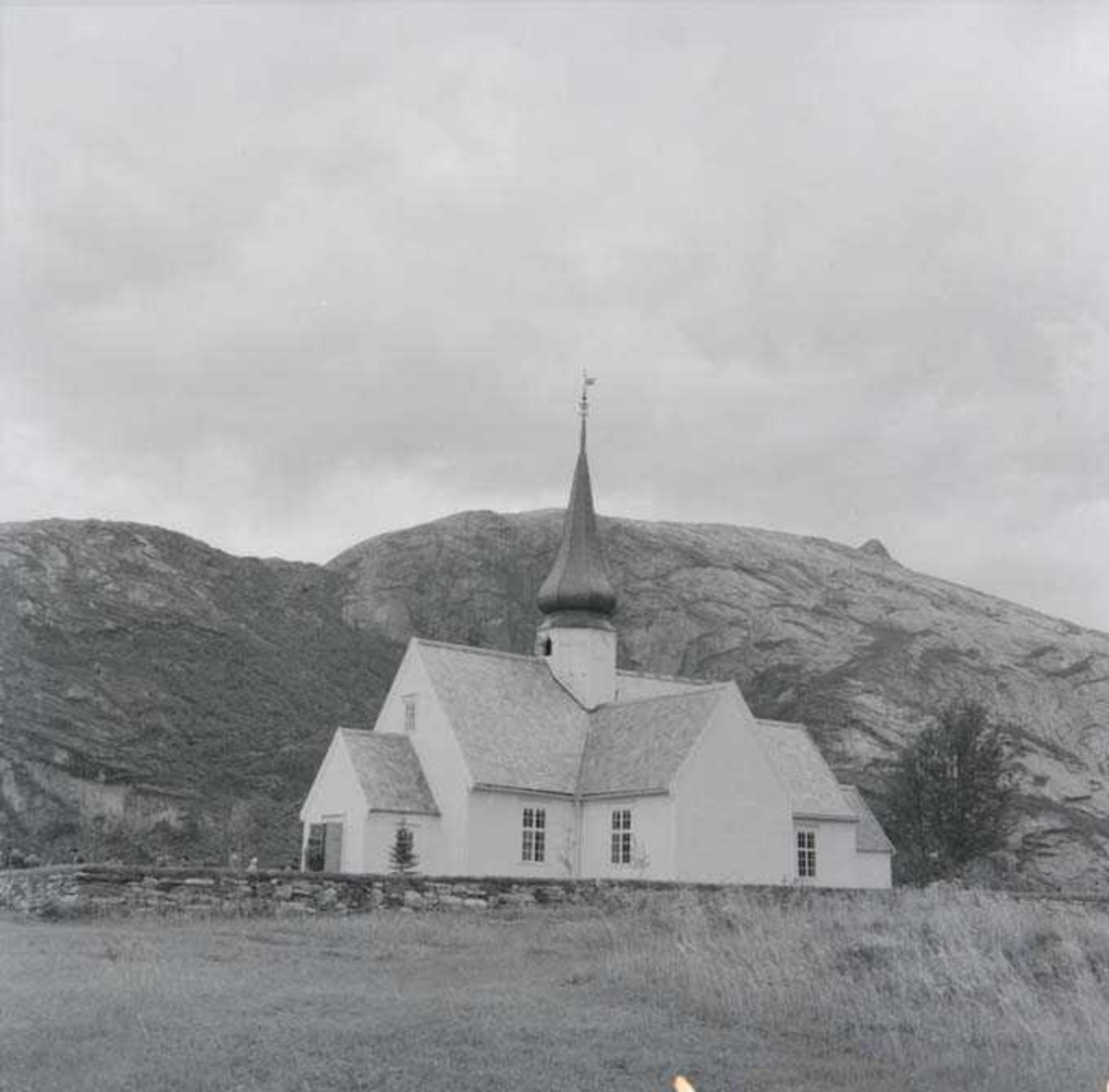
Exterior view

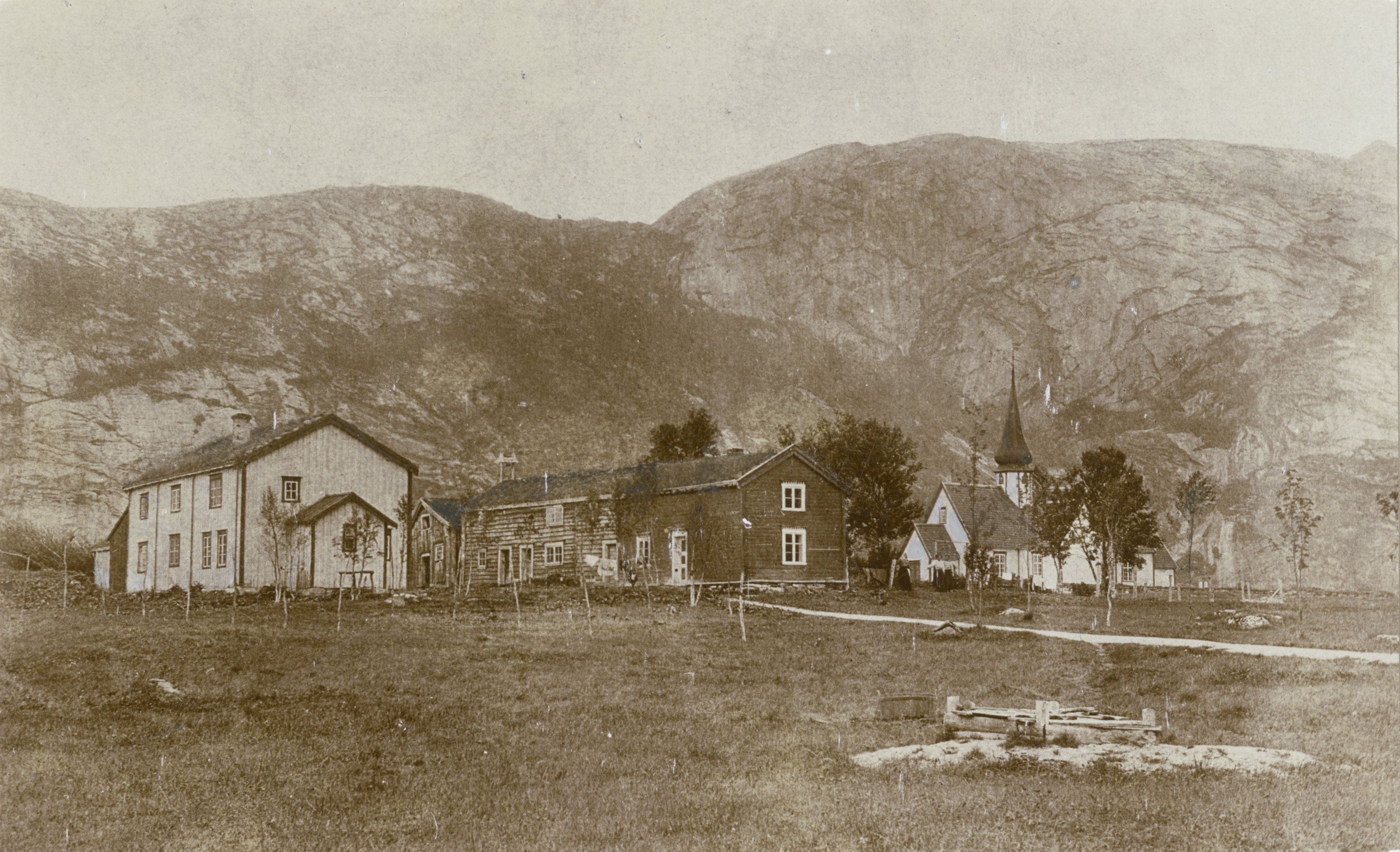
Parsonage

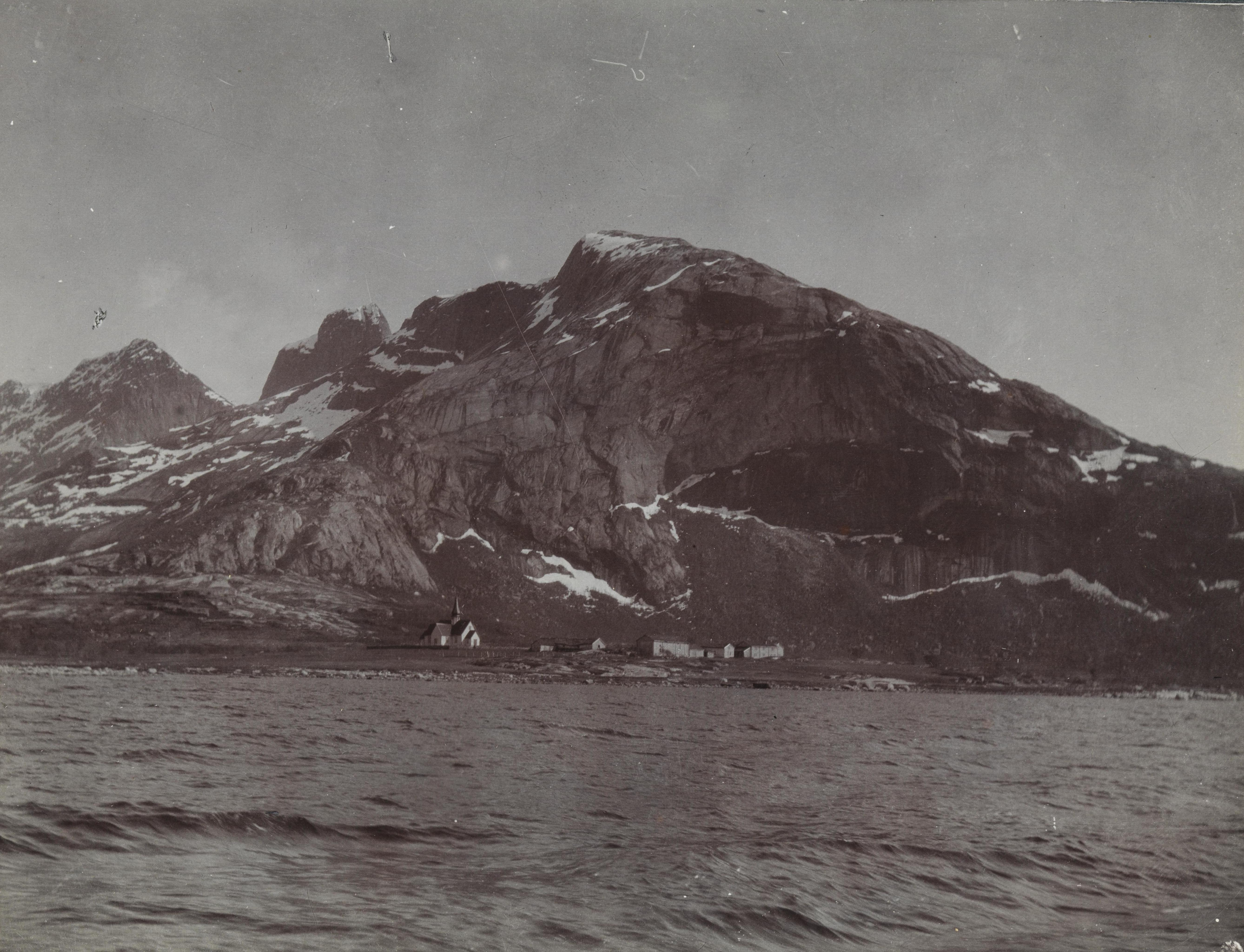
View of the area

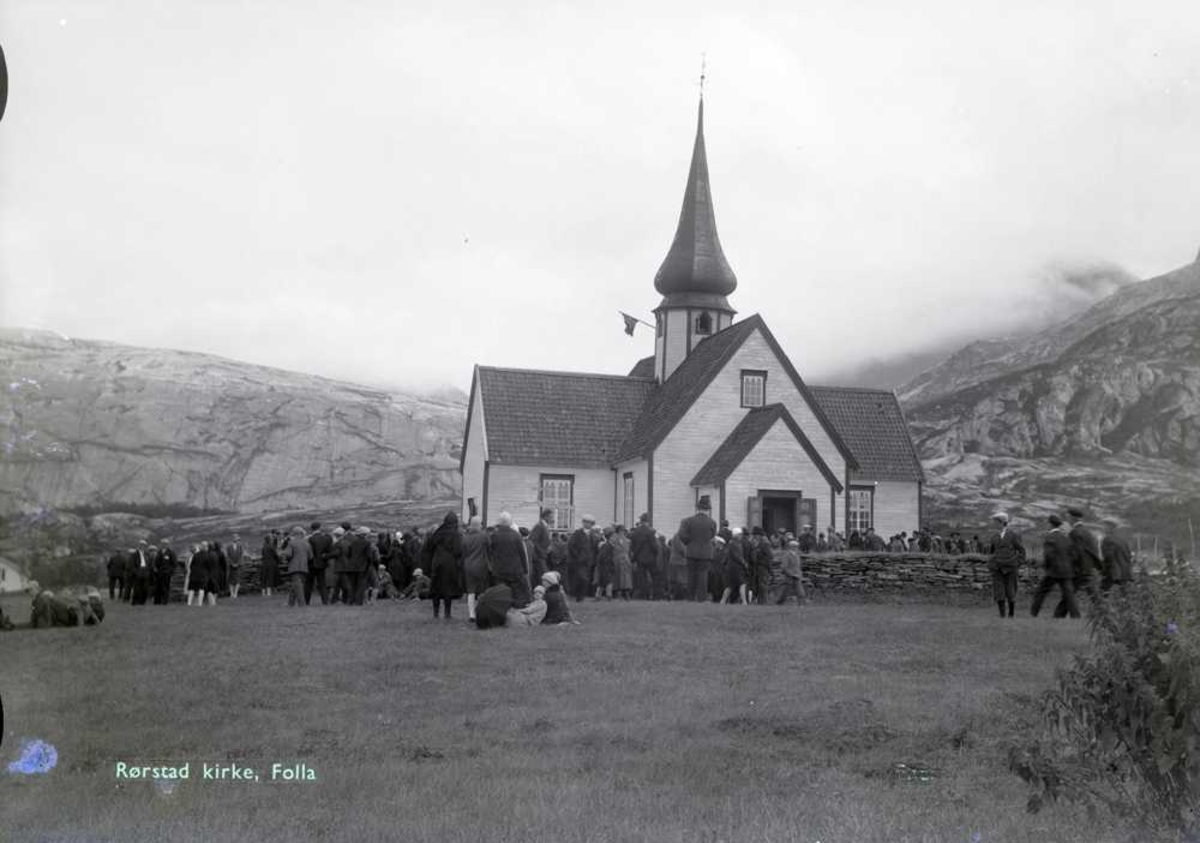
Church and congregation (c. 1930)

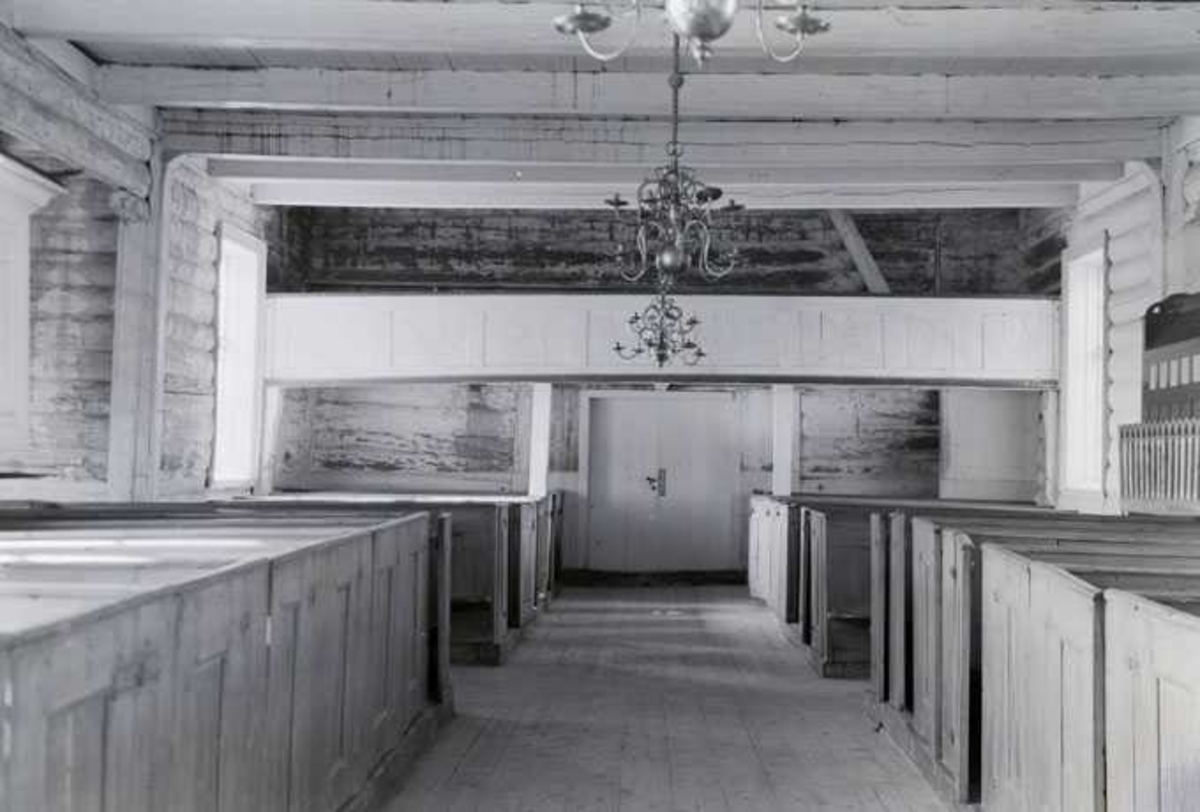
Interior view

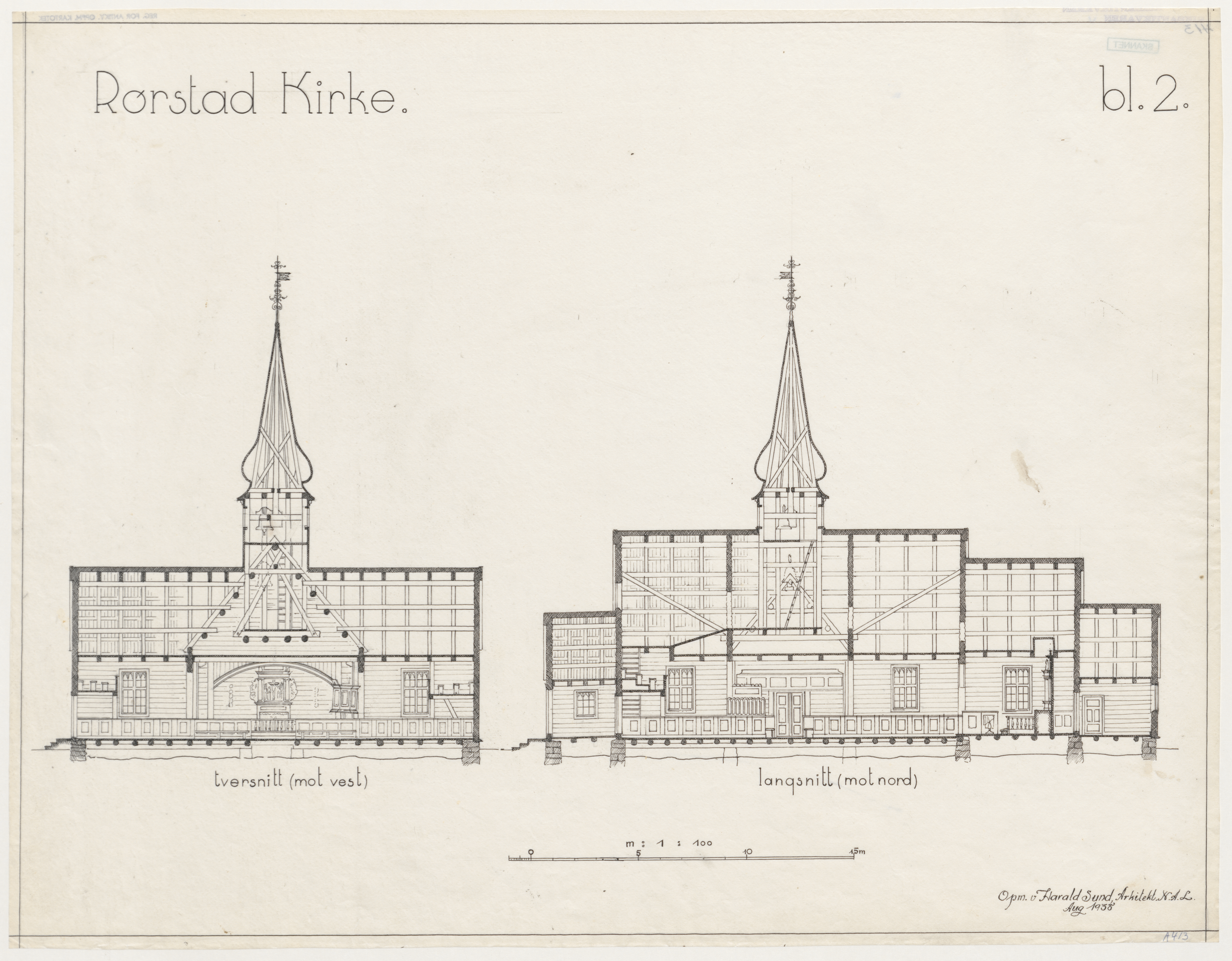
Design of the building

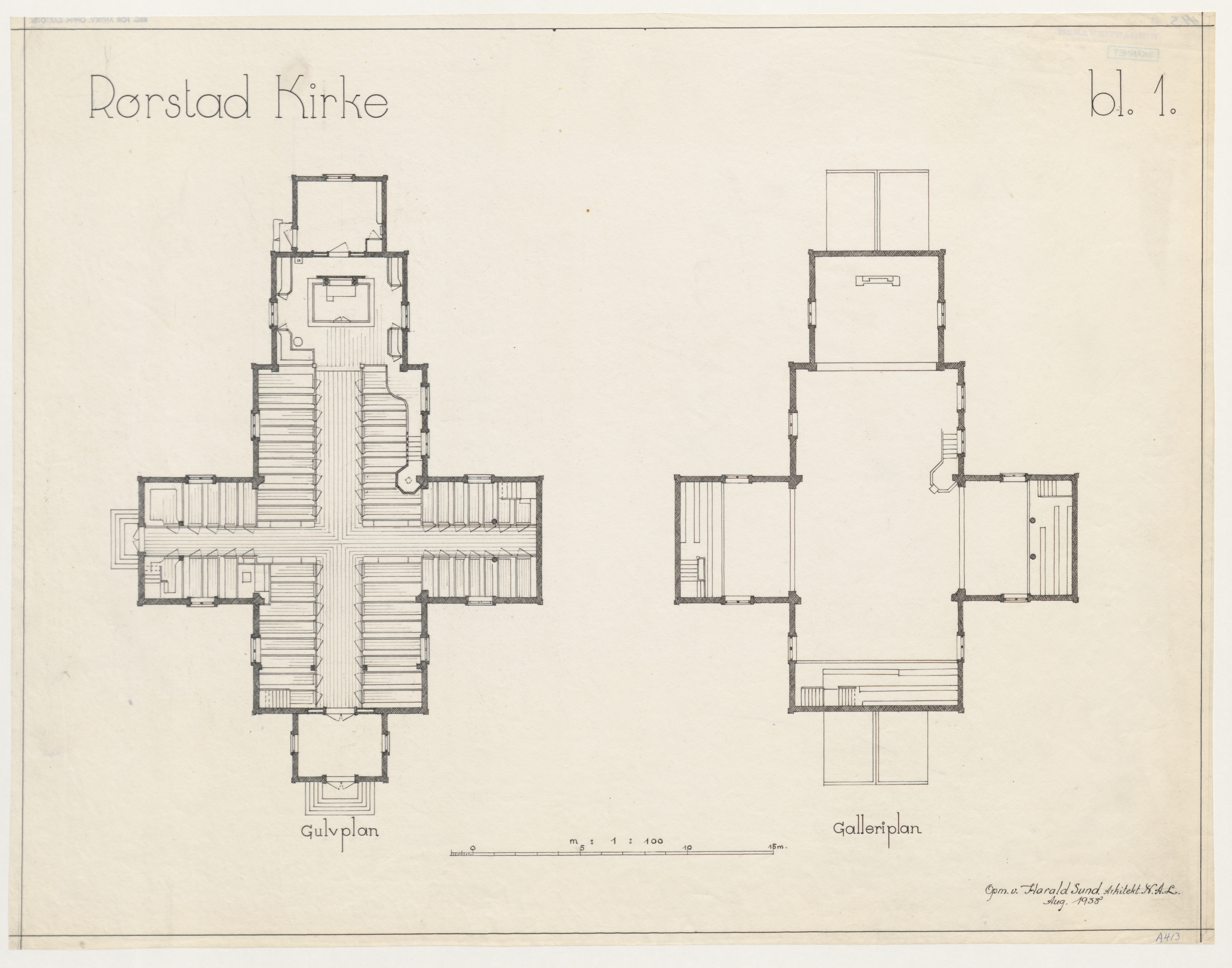
Floor plans of the building

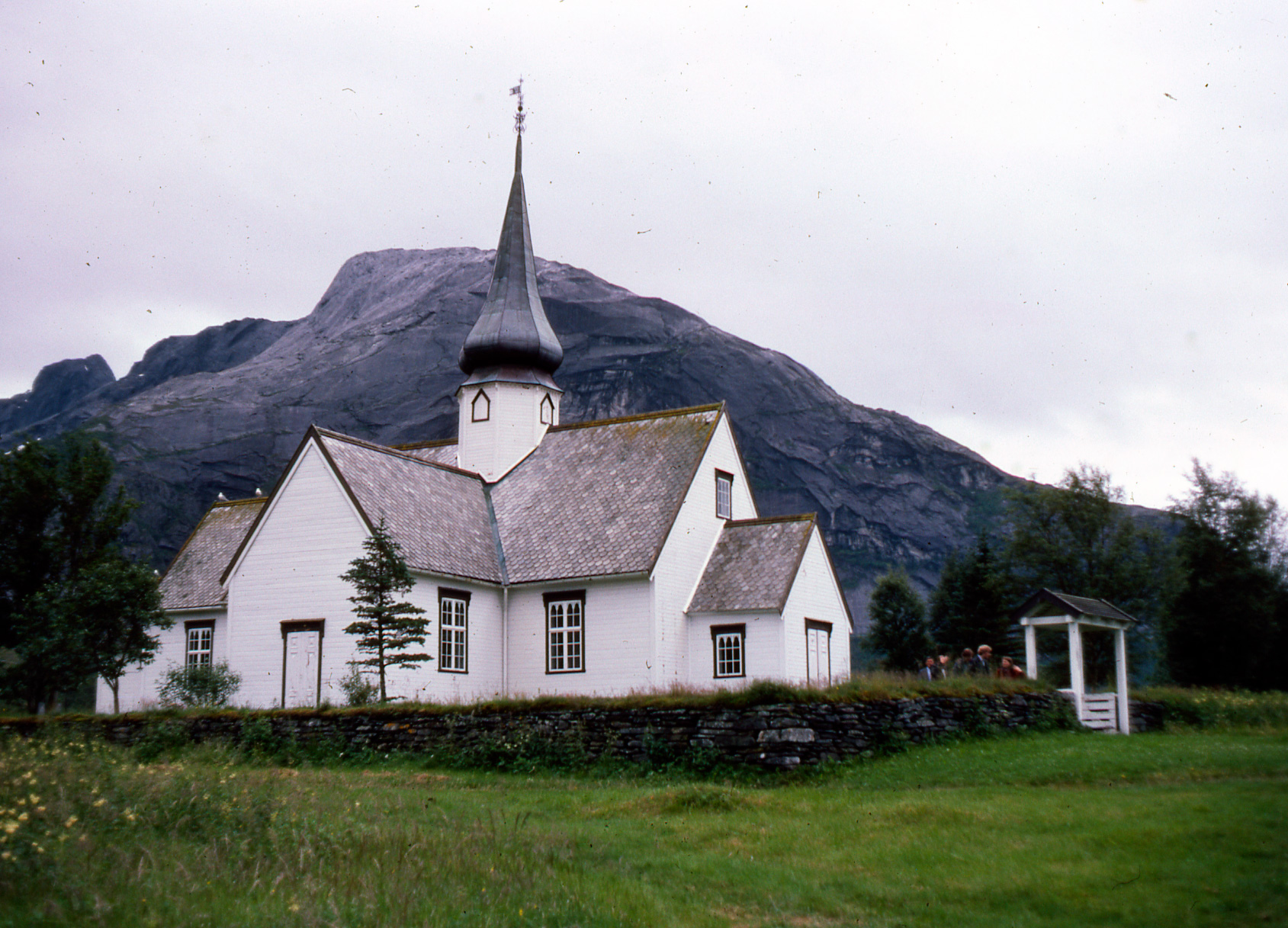
Church in 1982

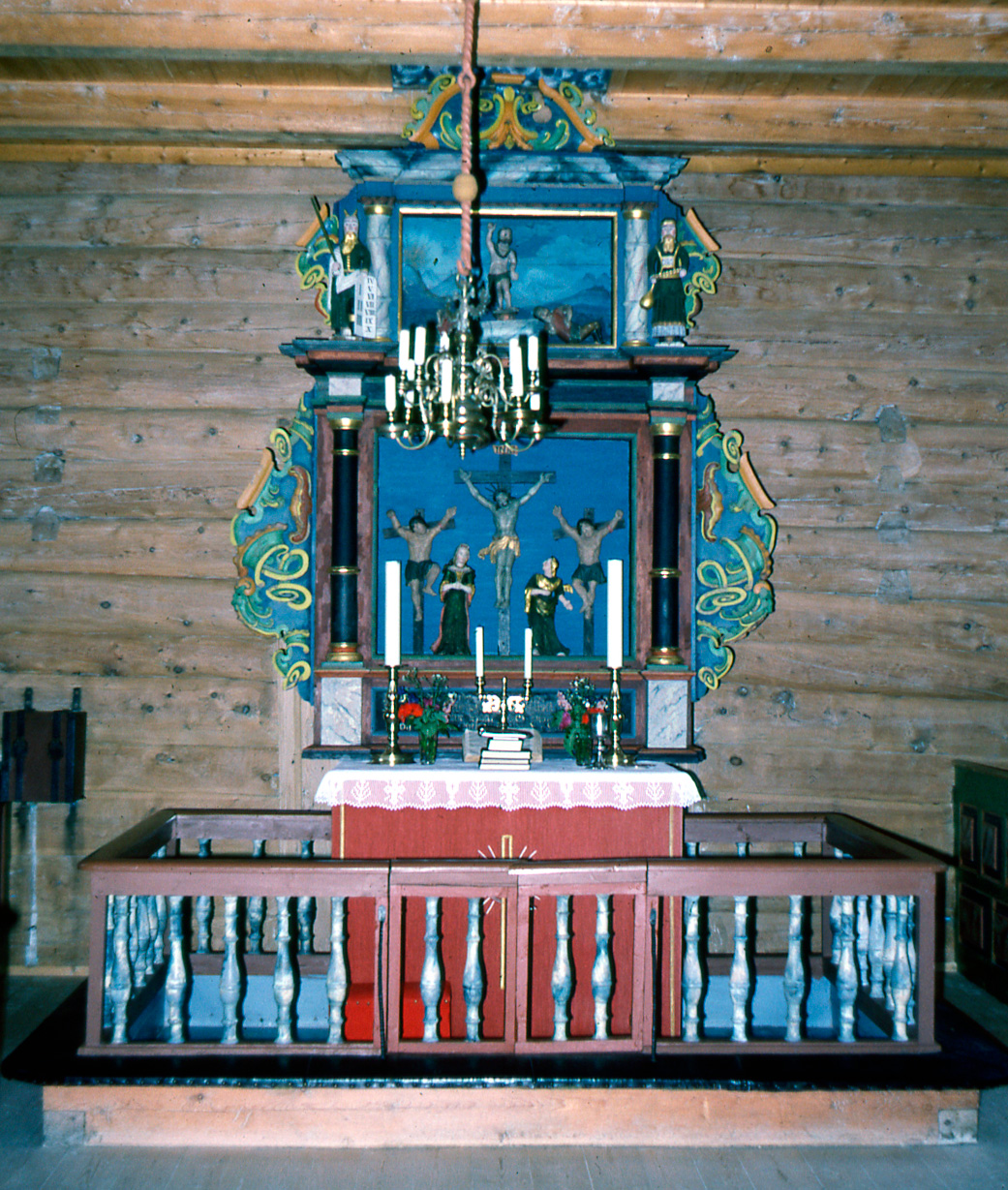
Altar in 1982

== See also ==
- List of churches in Sør-Hålogaland
