= Oscarville =

Oscarville may refer to:

- Oscarville, Alaska, a census-designated place in Bethel Census Area
- Oscarville, Georgia, a former town now submerged within Lake Lanier

== See also ==
- Oscar Township, Otter Tail County, Minnesota, a township
- Óscar Villa (disambiguation), a name shared by two Mexican footballers
