= Eagle Lake Township, Otter Tail County, Minnesota =

Eagle Lake Township, Minnesota
- Township
- Location of Eagle Lake Township, within Otter Tail County, Minnesota

- Location within the state of Minnesota Eagle Lake Township, Minnesota (the United States)
- Coordinates: 46°9′28″N 95°41′35″W
- Country: United States
- State: Minnesota
- County: Otter Tail

Area
  - Total: 36.0 sq mi (93.3 km^{2})
  - Land: 31.9 sq mi (82.5 km^{2})
  - Water: 4.2 sq mi (10.8 km^{2})
- Elevation: 1,293 ft (394 m)

Population (2020)
  - Total: 397
  - Density: 12.5/sq mi (4.81/km^{2})
- Time zone: UTC-6 (Central (CST))
  - Summer (DST): UTC-5 (CDT)
- FIPS code: 27-17396
- GNIS feature ID: 0664018

Eagle Lake Township is a township in Otter Tail County, Minnesota, United States. The population was 397 at the 2020 census.

Eagle Lake Township was organized in 1870, and named for the largest lake within its borders.

== Geography ==
According to the United States Census Bureau, the township has a total area of 36.0 square miles (93 km^{2}), of which 31.9 square miles (83 km^{2}) is land and 4.2 square miles (11 km^{2}) (11.55%) is water.

Organized on the 5th day of September, 1870, Eagle Lake Township bears the name of its deepest and largest lake, Eagle Lake. Commonly referred to as the "Leaf Mountains", it is here in Otter Tail County whereby two moraines, the Fergus Falls Moraine and Leaf Hills Moraine, unite to create a belt of drift hills, stretching across five townships, giving the region profound definition. Towering up to 350 feet high, with a range three to five miles wide, the Leaf Mountains provide views of the neighboring counties and watersheds. Such is the case at Indian Hill in neighboring Oscar Township, whereby views to the west overlook plains of the Glacial Lake Agassiz in Wilkin County.

== Demographics ==
As of the census of 2000, there were 367 people, 152 households, and 112 families residing in the township. The population density was 11.5 inhabitants per square mile (4.4/km^{2}). There were 348 housing units at an average density of 10.9 per square mile (4.2/km^{2}). The racial makeup of the township was 99.73% White, and 0.27% from two or more races. Hispanic or Latino of any race were 0.27% of the population. 53.8% were of Norwegian, 20.1% German and 10.8% Swedish ancestry according to Census 2000.

There were 152 households, out of which 28.3% had children under the age of 18 living with them, 67.8% were married couples living together, 4.6% had a female householder with no husband present, and 26.3% were non-families. 25.0% of all households were made up of individuals, and 8.6% had someone living alone who was 65 years of age or older. The average household size was 2.41 and the average family size was 2.88.

In the township the population was spread out, with 25.9% under the age of 18, 3.5% from 18 to 24, 20.2% from 25 to 44, 33.0% from 45 to 64, and 17.4% who were 65 years of age or older. The median age was 45 years. For every 100 females, there were 107.3 males. For every 100 females age 18 and over, there were 103.0 males.

The median income for a household in the township was $31,875, and the median income for a family was $39,583. Males had a median income of $26,750 versus $20,833 for females. The per capita income for the township was $15,792. About 12.6% of families and 12.4% of the population were below the poverty line, including 11.6% of those under age 18 and 29.1% of those age 65 or over.
