= Indian Hill (Minnesota) =

Hill in Oscar Township, Minnesota, USA

Coordinates: 48.3315877°N 93.0798792°W

Indian Hill, in section nine of Oscar Township, Otter Tail County, Minnesota, is a peak in the Leaf Mountains of west-central Minnesota. It is about 3.5 miles southeast of Rothsay, Minnesota, on the east side of Interstate 94. On its west side, the hill provides a high vantage point over the upper valley of the Red River of the North, while to the east it provides a view of the adjacent moraines.
