= Inspiration Peak =

Mountain in Minnesota, United States

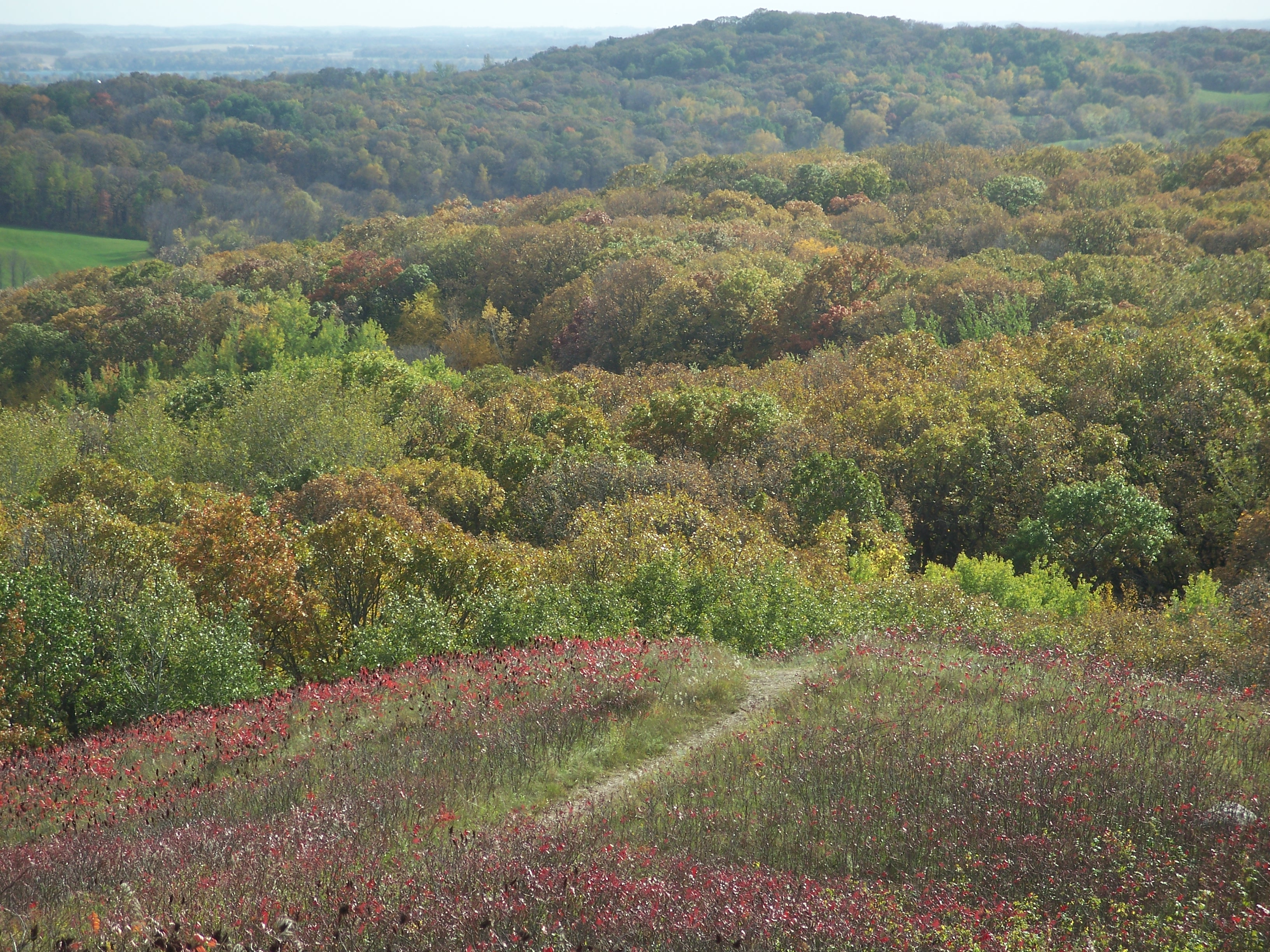
- View from Inspiration Peak, showing prairie vegetation (foreground) at top

Highest point
- Elevation: 1,727 feet (526 m)
- Coordinates: 46°8′10.644″N 95°34′25.32″W

Geography
- Location: northwest of Alexandria
- Parent range: Leaf Hills Moraines

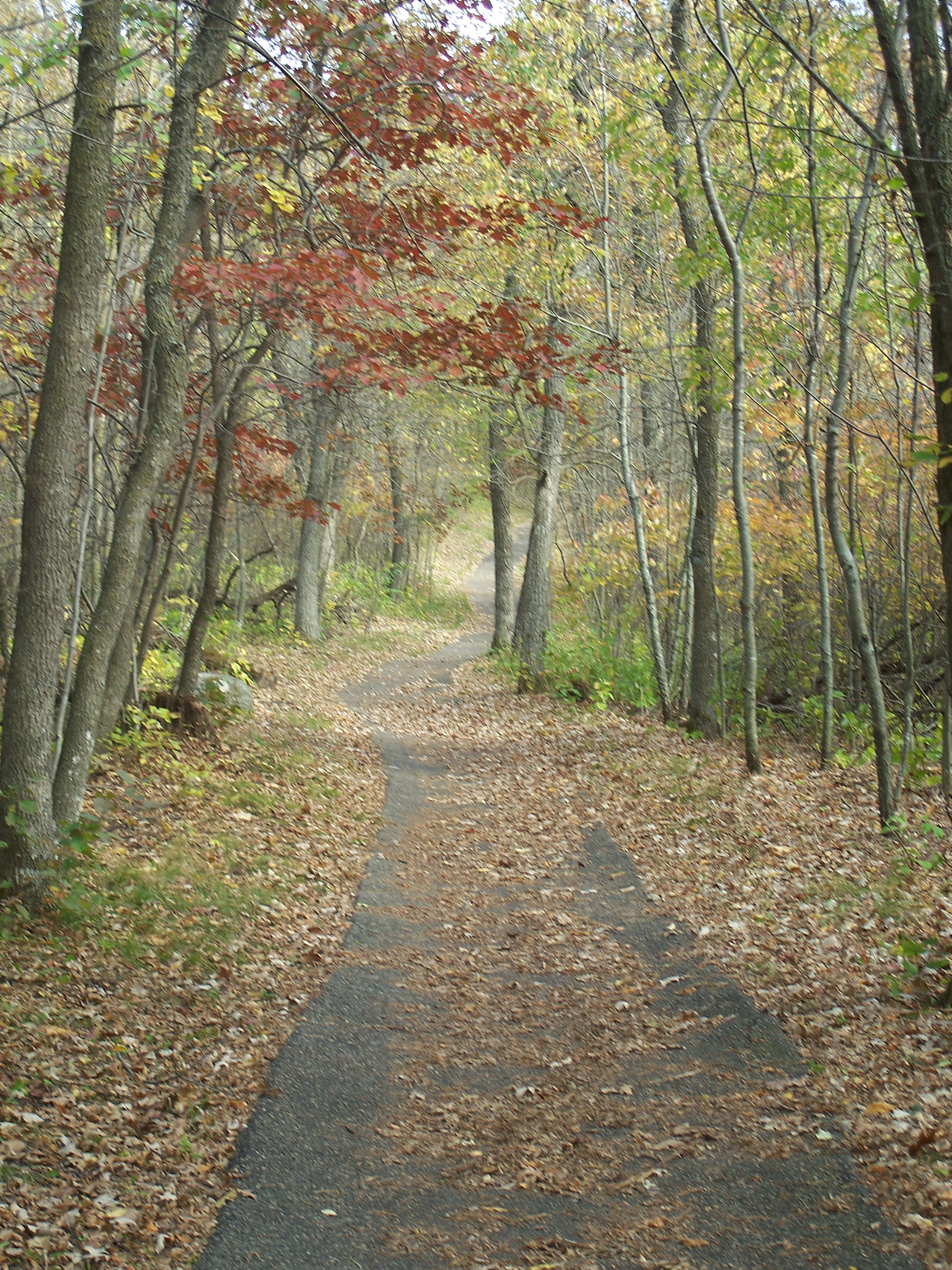
Start of path to summit through oak mixed forest

Inspiration Peak is a glacial feature of the Leaf Hills Moraines and of Otter Tail County in the U.S. State of Minnesota and is the second highest peak in Otter Tail County. It is 22 miles (35 km) northwest of Alexandria. The peak rises about 310 feet (94 m) above the surrounding plains, to an elevation of about 1,727 feet (526 m) above sea level. It is the central feature of Inspiration Peak State Wayside, a small recreation area maintained by the Minnesota Department of Natural Resources, which manages it from nearby Lake Carlos State Park. The wayside has a paved parking lot and a picnic area. The hike to the top is a short but strenuous walk up a well-worn trail from the parking lot.

A conical-shaped hill, Inspiration Peak is a kame formed atop the Alexandria Moraine, a terminal moraine left by the Wadena and Des Moines lobes of the Wisconsonian glaciation. It is on the boundary between the deciduous forest to the east and prairie to the west. In fact both biomes are present on the hill; its foot is covered with a predominantly oak forest, while its open upper reaches have prairie species such as pasqueflower, blazing star, asters, and goldenrod.

Author Sinclair Lewis, a native of nearby Sauk Centre, Minnesota, said of Inspiration Peak, "there's to be seen a glorious 20-mile circle of some 50 lakes scattered among fields and pastures, like sequins fallen on an old Paisley shawl."

A slightly higher peak is located on private land 5 miles (8.0 km) miles northeast of Inspiration Peak.
