= Leaf Hills Moraines =

Range of hills in Minnesota, U.S.

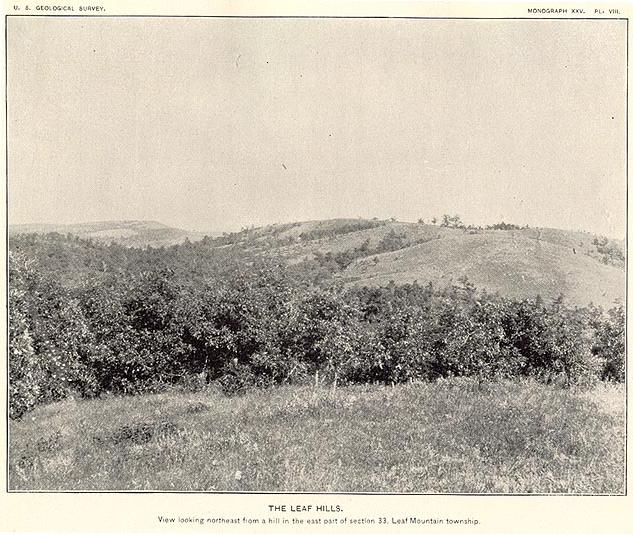
Photograph c. 1895 of Leaf Hills in west-central Minnesota

The Leaf Hills Moraines, sometimes called the Leaf Mountains, are a range of hills in west-central Minnesota. The land does not exhibit many characteristics of mountains, and rises typically to a height of 100 to 300 feet (30 to 91 m) above the surrounding farmland, occasionally reaching higher than 350 feet (107 m). The name of this range of hills is translated from the Ojibwe Gaaskibag-wajiwan, which was interpreted by Gilfillan as “Rustling Leaf Mountains.” The name is also shared by Leaf Mountain Township, the two Leaf Lakes ("Gaaskibag-wajiwi-zaaga'iganan"), and the Leaf River ("Gaaskibag-wajiwi-ziibi"), all named for the hills. In turn, the hills in Ojibwe are named after Inspiration Peak ("Gaaskibag-wajiw"), a prominent hill in this area.

== Description ==
The hills are described by Upham as "running southeast from Fergus Falls to the south line of the county and thence east and northeast to East Leaf Lake, a distance of 50 miles." Through their full extent in Otter Tail County, the hills have steeply sloped sides covered by prairies and deciduous forests, primarily maple and oak.

== Geology ==
The hills are formed by the convergence of the eighth and ninth marginal moraines formed by the Wadena and Des Moines lobes of the Wisconsonian glaciation. This moraine forms an arc about ten to twenty miles (16 -32 km) wide and 200 miles (320 km) long. It is composed of a huge volume of morainic drift up to 350 feet (107 m) thick, overlain with thin sandy soil as well as rocks and boulders.

== Landforms ==
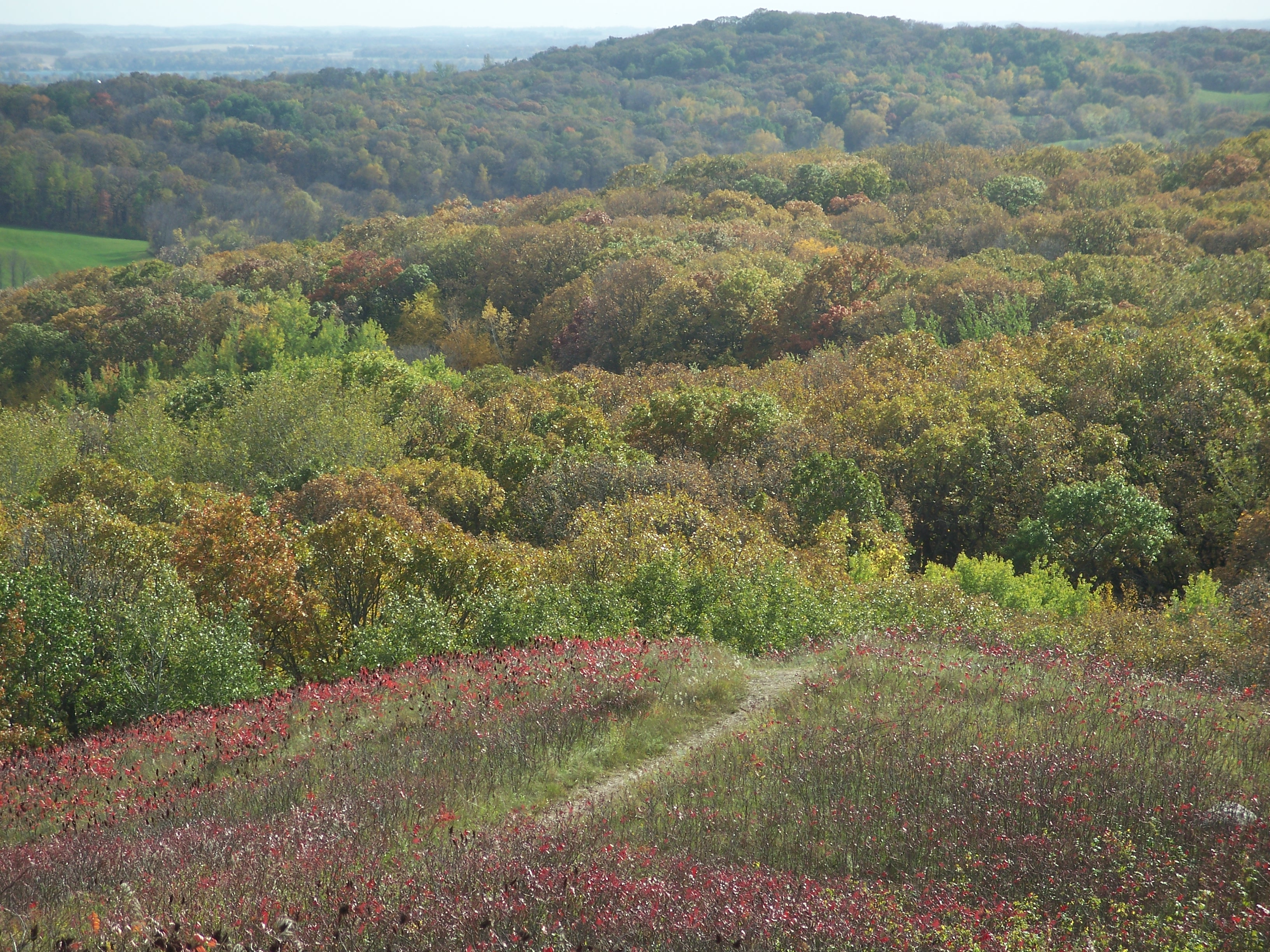
View from top of Inspiration Peak

The hills' outline is irregular, and in many places the range is broken by rivers, streams, and lakes. Among the high points of the range that have received names are Indian Hill and Inspiration Peak. Higher terrain is located about five miles northeast of Inspiration Peak. Pekan Peak (unofficial name) in Section 32, Folden Township, Otter Tail County, Minnesota, discovered by John Sandy in February 2022, at coordinates 46°11′54.744″ N 95°30′4.248″ W (DMS), Latitude 46.19854 Longitude -95.50118 (DD), has an elevation of 1,800.05 feet (548.66 meters), measured by LiDAR (Light Detection and Ranging) technology.

== History ==
Paleoindians lived in the area at least 6,000 years ago, and perhaps longer, as earlier remains have been found in the general vicinity. Artifacts from both the Prairie and Woodland cultures have been found; most items date from a period starting 900 to 1200 years ago. In more recent times, the region was held by the Dakota until they were displaced by the Ojibwa in the eighteenth century.

Also in the eighteenth century, the area became a source of pelts for the fur trade. In the 1840s, the mountains were pierced by the Woods Trail and skirted by the East Plains Trail, two of the Red River Trails between Fort Garry (modern Winnipeg) and Saint Paul, Minnesota. These trails opened up the area to settlement in the last half of the nineteenth century.

Due to their steepness and the abundance of fieldstone and boulders, the hills were found by pioneers to be generally unsuitable for plowing but well suited for raising and grazing livestock. Part of the region has been preserved in Maplewood State Park and another part is preserved in Inspiration Peak State Wayside Park.

== See also ==
- Terminal moraine
- List of glacial moraines
