= Folden Township, Otter Tail County, Minnesota =

Folden Township, Minnesota
- Township
- Location of Folden Township, within Otter Tail County, Minnesota

- Location within the state of Minnesota Folden Township, Minnesota (the United States)
- Coordinates: 46°14′14″N 95°28′24″W
- Country: United States
- State: Minnesota
- County: Otter Tail

Area
  - Total: 35.6 sq mi (92.2 km^{2})
  - Land: 34.5 sq mi (89.3 km^{2})
  - Water: 1.1 sq mi (2.8 km^{2})
- Elevation: 1,430 ft (436 m)

Population (2020)
  - Total: 289
  - Density: 8.38/sq mi (3.24/km^{2})
- Time zone: UTC-6 (Central (CST))
  - Summer (DST): UTC-5 (CDT)
- FIPS code: 27-21518
- GNIS feature ID: 0664185

Folden Township is a township in Otter Tail County, Minnesota, United States. The population was 289 at the 2020 census.

== History ==
Folden Township was organized in 1881, and named after the old Folden Municipality in Norway.

== Geography ==
According to the United States Census Bureau, the township has a total area of 35.6 square miles (92 km^{2}), of which 34.5 square miles (89 km^{2}) is land and 1.1 square miles (2.8 km^{2}) (3.06%) is water. The highest elevation in Otter Tail County is found in Folden Township, Section 32, northeast of Urbank. Pekan Peak (unofficial name) discovered by John Sandy in February 2022, at coordinates 46°11′54.744″ N 95°30′4.248″ W (DMS), Latitude 46.19854 Longitude -95.50118 (DD), has an elevation of 1,800.05 feet (548.66 meters), measured by LiDAR (Light Detection and Ranging) technology.

== Demographics ==
As of the census of 2000, there were 265 people, 112 households, and 81 families living in the township. The population density was 7.7 inhabitants per square mile (3.0/km^{2}). There were 151 housing units at an average density of 4.4 per square mile (1.7/km^{2}). The racial makeup of the township was 98.87% White, 0.75% Asian, and 0.38% from two or more races. Hispanic or Latino of any race were 0.38% of the population.

There were 112 households, out of which 22.3% had children under the age of 18 living with them, 67.9% were married couples living together, 2.7% had a female householder with no husband present, and 26.8% were non-families. 22.3% of all households were made up of individuals, and 7.1% had someone living alone who was 65 years of age or older. The average household size was 2.37 and the average family size was 2.79.

In the township the population was spread out, with 17.0% under the age of 18, 4.9% from 18 to 24, 24.2% from 25 to 44, 34.3% from 45 to 64, and 19.6% who were 65 years of age or older. The median age was 47 years. For every 100 females, there were 107.0 males. For every 100 females age 18 and over, there were 122.2 males.

The median income for a household in the township was $38,333, and the median income for a family was $40,250. Males had a median income of $27,250 versus $26,563 for females. The per capita income for the township was $18,252. About 4.6% of families and 6.9% of the population were below the poverty line, including 2.1% of those under the age of eighteen and 4.8% of those 65 or over.
