= Óscar Villa =

Óscar Villa may refer to:

- Óscar Villa (footballer, born 1994), Mexican football forward for Jaiba Brava
- Óscar Villa (footballer, born 2001), Mexican football fullback for Puebla
