= Røsvik Church =

Church in Nordland, Norway

- Røsvik kirke
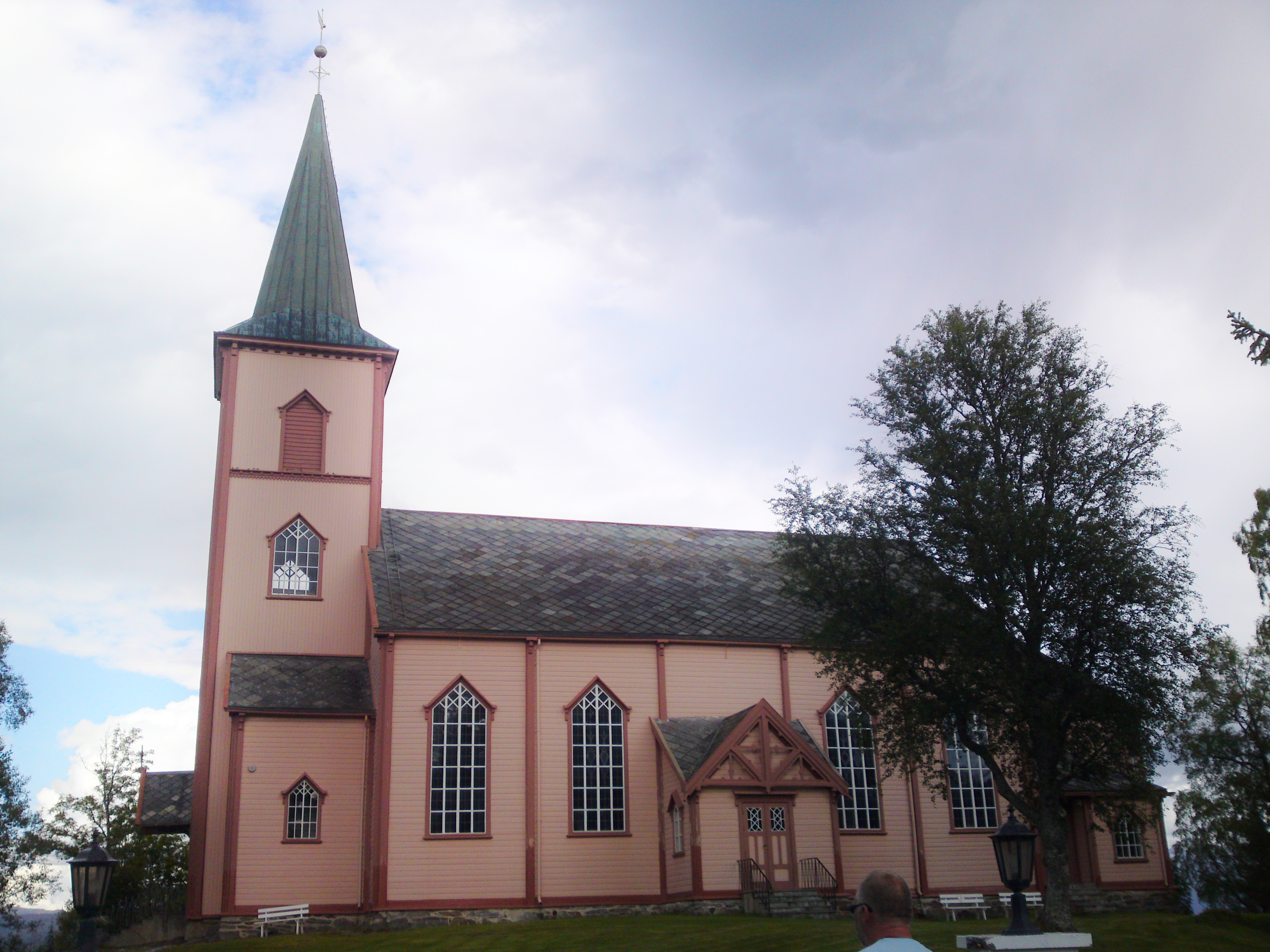
- View of the church
- Røsvik Church
- 67.48120132°N 15.46746832°E
- Location: Sørfold Municipality, Nordland
- Country: Norway
- Denomination: Church of Norway
- Churchmanship: Evangelical Lutheran

History
- Status: Parish church
- Founded: 1883
- Consecrated: 1883

Architecture
- Functional status: Active
- Architect(s): Knut Guttormsen and Jon Andersen Leistad
- Architectural type: Long church
- Style: Gothic
- Completed: 1883 (143 years ago)

Specifications
- Capacity: 600
- Materials: Wood

Administration
- Diocese: Sør-Hålogaland
- Deanery: Salten prosti
- Parish: Sørfold
- Norwegian Cultural Heritage Site
- Type: Church
- Status: Not protected
- ID: 85344

Røsvik Church (Norwegian: Røsvik kirke) is a parish church of the Church of Norway in Sørfold Municipality in Nordland county, Norway. It is located in the village of Røsvika. It is one of the churches for the Sørfold parish which is part of the Salten prosti (deanery) in the Diocese of Sør-Hålogaland. The brown, gothic-style, wooden church was built in a long church style in 1883 by the architects Knut Guttormsen and Jon Andersen Leistad. The church seats about 600 people.

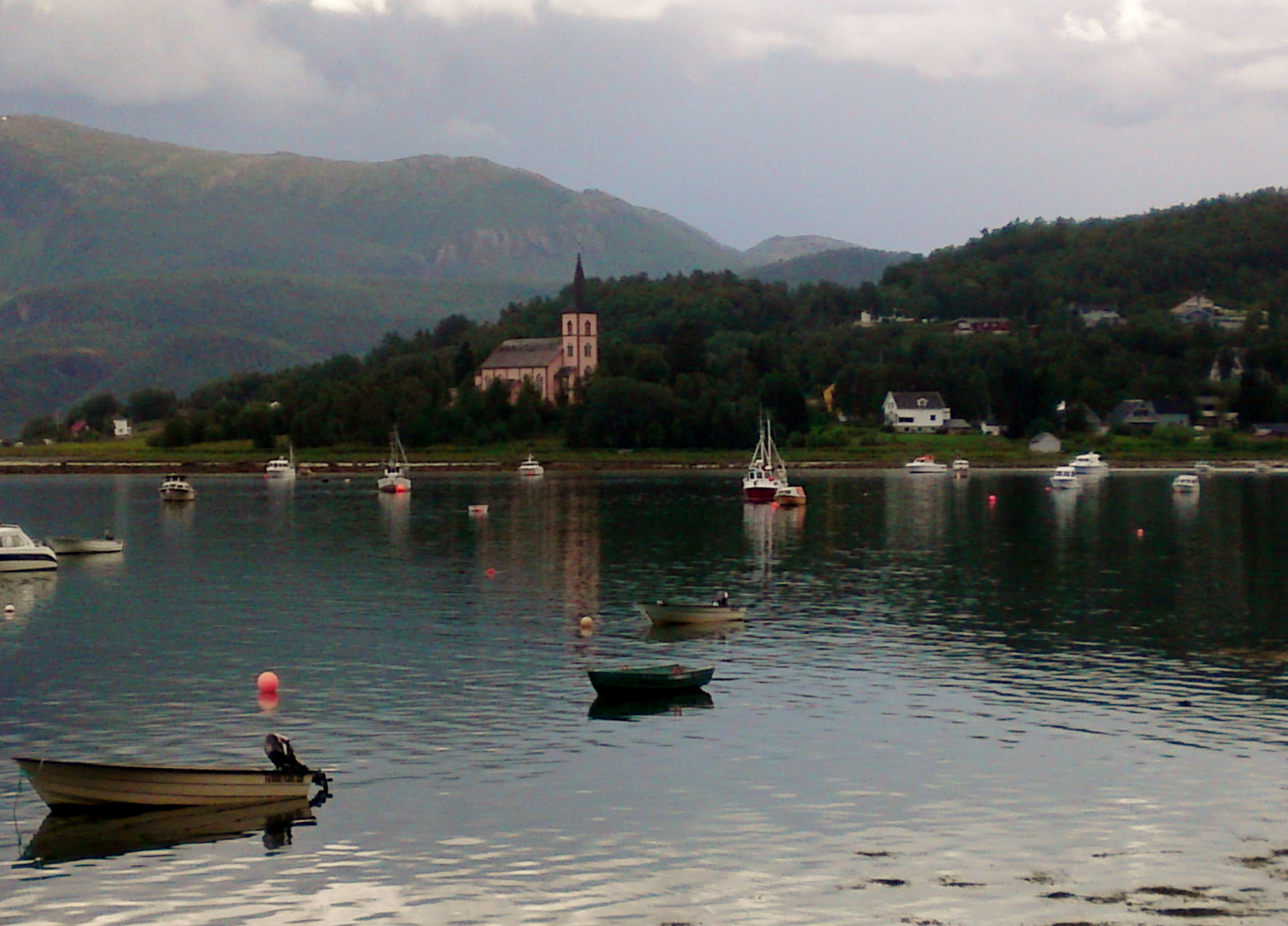

== See also ==
- List of churches in Sør-Hålogaland
