= Oscar Township, Otter Tail County, Minnesota =

Oscar Township, Minnesota
- Township
- Location of Oscar Township, within Otter Tail County, Minnesota

- Location within the state of Minnesota Oscar Township, Minnesota (the United States)
- Coordinates: 46°24′7″N 96°12′34″W
- Country: United States
- State: Minnesota
- County: Otter Tail

Area
  - Total: 36.1 sq mi (93.4 km^{2})
  - Land: 34.6 sq mi (89.7 km^{2})
  - Water: 1.4 sq mi (3.6 km^{2})
- Elevation: 1,240 ft (378 m)

Population (2020)
  - Total: 208
  - Density: 6.01/sq mi (2.32/km^{2})
- Time zone: UTC-6 (Central (CST))
  - Summer (DST): UTC-5 (CDT)
- FIPS code: 27-48850
- GNIS feature ID: 0665227
- Website: https://www.oscartownship.com/

Oscar Township is a township in Otter Tail County, Minnesota, United States. The population was 208 at the 2020 census.

Oscar Township was organized in 1873, and named for Oscar II of Sweden.

== Geography ==
According to the United States Census Bureau, the township has a total area of 36.0 square miles (93.4 km^{2}), of which 34.6 square miles (89.7 km^{2}) is land and 1.4 square miles (3.7 km^{2}) (3.91%) is water.

== Demographics ==
As of the census of 2000, there were 218 people, 79 households, and 65 families residing in the township. The population density was 6.3 people per square mile (2.4/km^{2}). There were 96 housing units at an average density of 2.8/sq mi (1.1/km^{2}). The racial makeup of the township was 96.33% White, 0.46% African American, 1.83% Asian, and 1.38% from two or more races.

There were 79 households, out of which 38.0% had children under the age of 18 living with them, 77.2% were married couples living together, 3.8% had a female householder with no husband present, and 16.5% were non-families. 15.2% of all households were made up of individuals, and 3.8% had someone living alone who was 65 years of age or older. The average household size was 2.76 and the average family size was 3.02.

In the township the population was spread out, with 28.4% under the age of 18, 5.5% from 18 to 24, 26.1% from 25 to 44, 23.9% from 45 to 64, and 16.1% who were 65 years of age or older. The median age was 40 years. For every 100 females, there were 107.6 males. For every 100 females age 18 and over, there were 108.0 males.

The median income for a household in the township was $43,750, and the median income for a family was $47,917. Males had a median income of $31,750 versus $21,250 for females. The per capita income for the township was $17,825. None of the population or families were below the poverty line.
