= Røsvika =

Village in Sørfold Municipality, Norway

Røsvika Røsvik
- Village
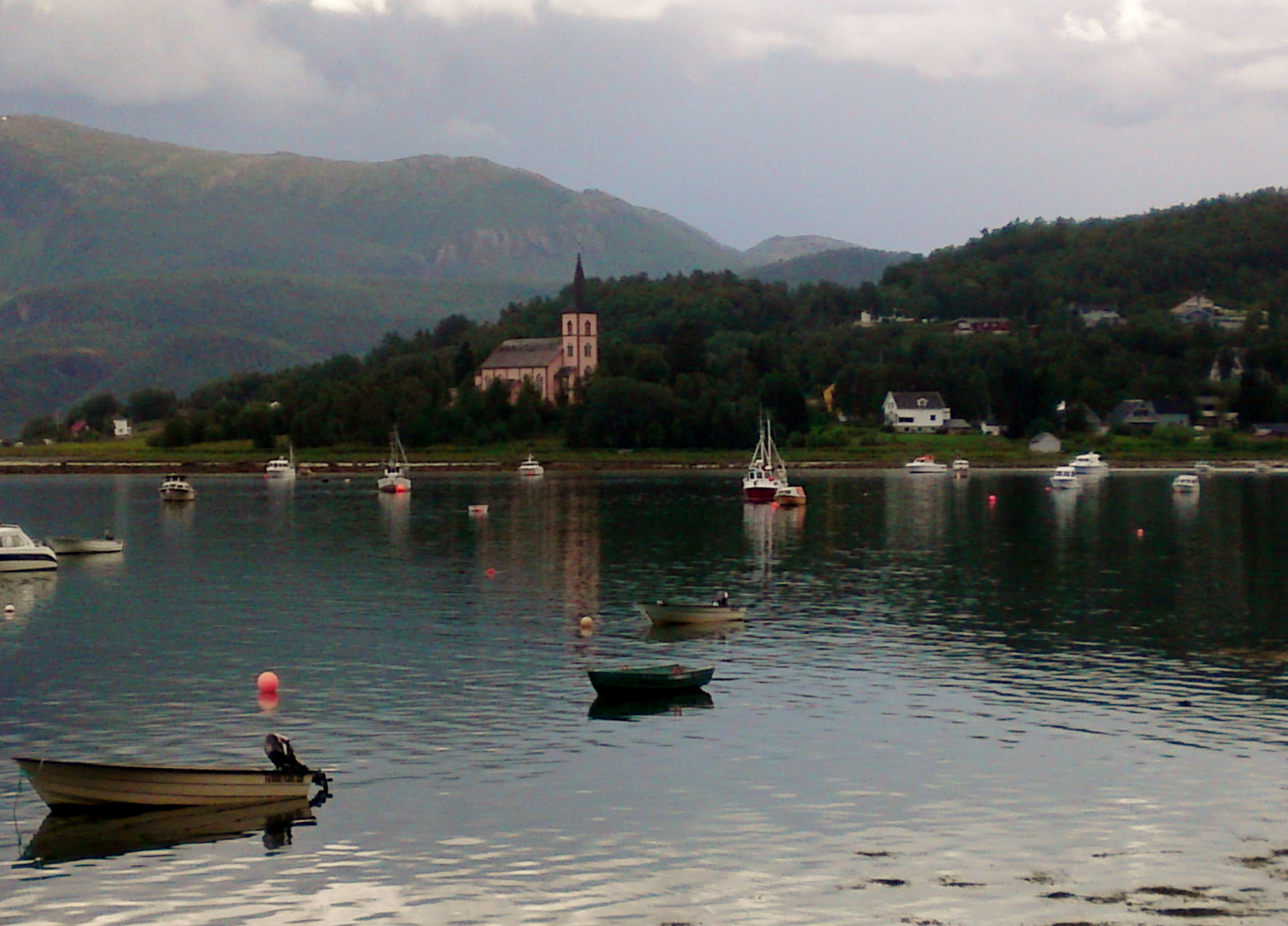
- Interactive map of Røsvika
- Location within Nordland Location within Norway
- Coordinates: 67.4781°N 15.4617°E
- Country: Norway
- Region: Northern Norway
- County: Nordland
- District: Salten
- Municipality: Sørfold Municipality

Area
  - Total: 0.52 km^{2} (0.20 sq mi)
- Elevation: 7 m (23 ft)

Population (2007)
  - Total: 209
  - Density: 402/km^{2} (1,040/sq mi)
- Time zone: UTC+01:00 (CET)
  - Summer (DST): UTC+02:00 (CEST)
- Post Code: 8220 Røsvik

Røsvika is a village in Sørfold Municipality in Nordland county, Norway. It is located along the southern shore of the Sørfolda fjord, about 20 kilometres (12 mi) north of the municipal centre of Straumen.

The 0.52-square-kilometre (130-acre) village had a population (2007) of 209 and a population density of 402 inhabitants per square kilometre (1,040/sq mi). Since 2007, the population and area data for this village area has not been separately tracked by Statistics Norway. The village is home to a nursing home, a psychiatric hospital, and Røsvik Church. It is now also home to YWAM Nordland.
