= Folda, Nordland =

Fjord in Nordland, Norway

Folda
- Interactive map of the fjord
- Location: Nordland county, Norway
- Coordinates: 67.6134°N 14.848°E
- Type: Fjord
- Basin countries: Norway
- Max. length: 60 kilometres (37 mi)
- Max. width: 9 kilometres (5.6 mi)
- Max. depth: 540 metres (1,770 ft)

The Folda is a fjord in Nordland county, Norway. The fjord is located in the waters of Bodø Municipality, Steigen Municipality, and Sørfold Municipality. The Folda empties into the Vestfjorden about 40 kilometres (25 mi) northeast of the town of Bodø. The fjord is about 9 kilometres (5.6 mi) wide in the west where it joins the Vestfjorden between the Kjerringøy and Leiranger peninsulas.

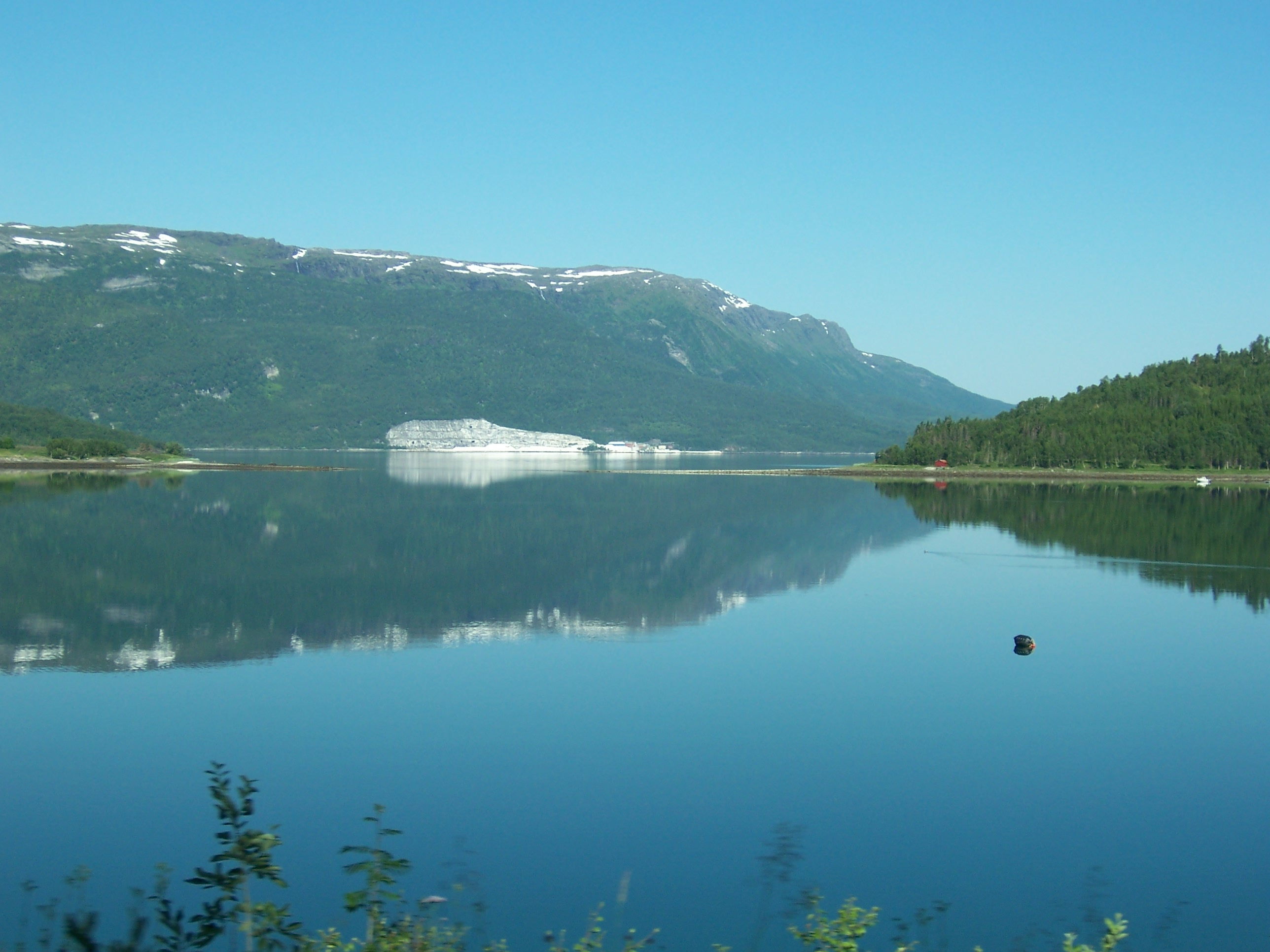
Sørfolda fjord branch, Sørfold Municipality

The Folda fjord has many fjord arms which split off from the main fjord. There are two main inland branches: the Nordfolda (in Steigen Municipality) and the Sørfolda (in Bodø and Sørfold municipalities). The fjord is about 60 kilometres (37 mi) long, including the fjord arms that branch off the main fjord.

== See also ==
- List of Norwegian fjords
