= Sørfolda =

Fjord in Nordland, Norway

Sørfolda (Norwegian); Oarjje-Fuolldá (Lule Sami)
- Sørfolla (Norwegian)
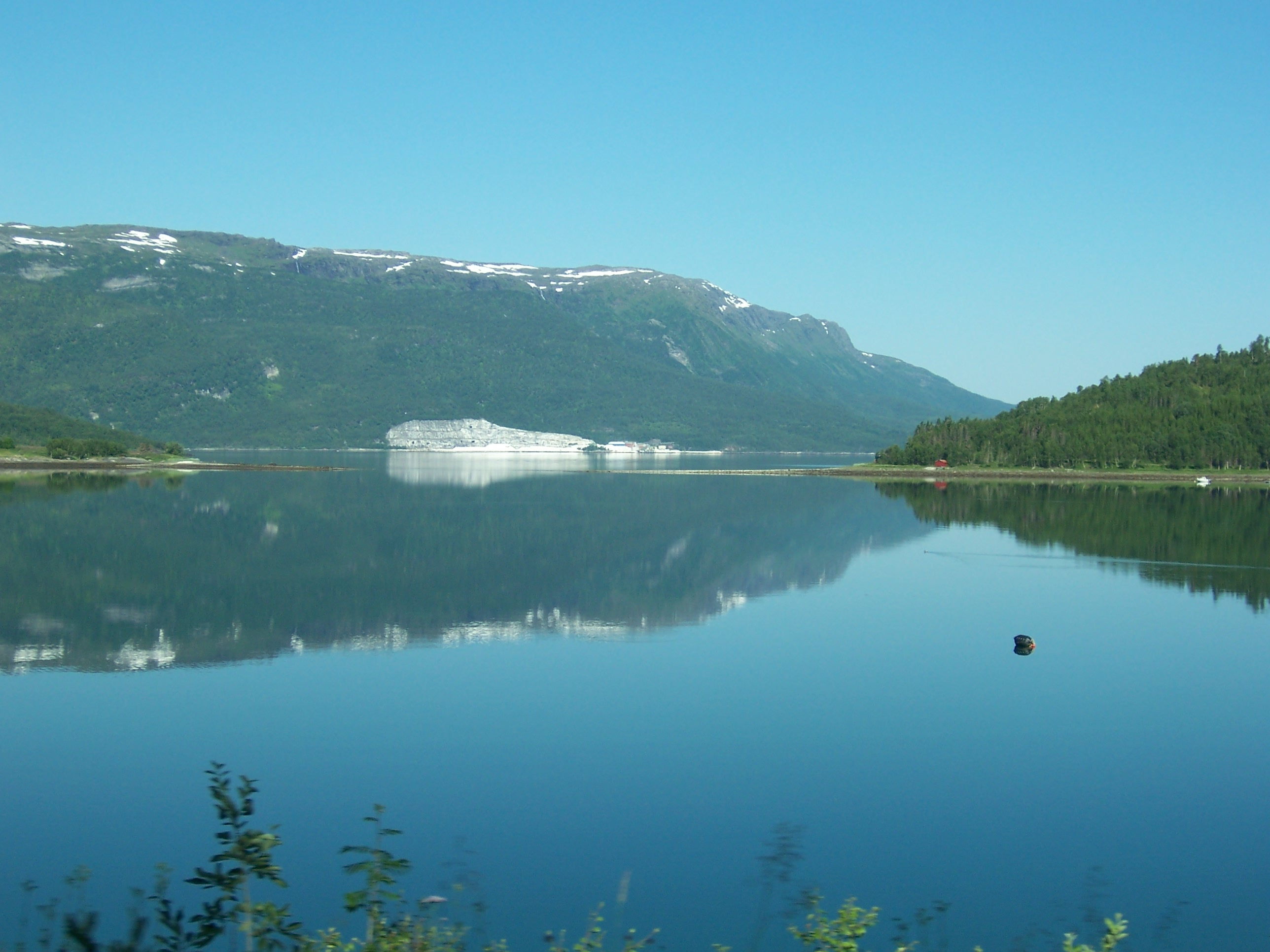
- View of the inner part of Sørfolda
- Interactive map of the fjord
- Location: Nordland county, Norway
- Coordinates: 67.5382°N 15.2161°E
- Type: Fjord
- Primary outflows: Folda
- Basin countries: Norway
- Max. length: 40 kilometres (25 mi)
- Max. depth: 573 metres (1,880 ft)

Sørfolda (Norwegian) or Oarjje-Fuolldá (Lule Sami) is a fjord in Nordland county, Norway. It is located in Sørfold Municipality and Bodø Municipality. The 40-kilometre (25 mi) Sørfolda is a southeastern branch of the main Folda fjord. Side branches include the Nevelsfjorden, Eidekjosen, Skjunkfjorden, and Leirfjorden. The deepest part of the fjord reaches 573 metres (1,880 ft) below sea level.

The village of Straumen is located at the innermost end of the Sørfolda. The village of Røsvika sits on the western shore of the fjord, about halfway along the fjord. The European route E06 runs along parts of the eastern shore of the fjord.

== See also ==
- List of Norwegian fjords
