= Søvika =

Village in Alstahaug Municipality, Norway

- Village
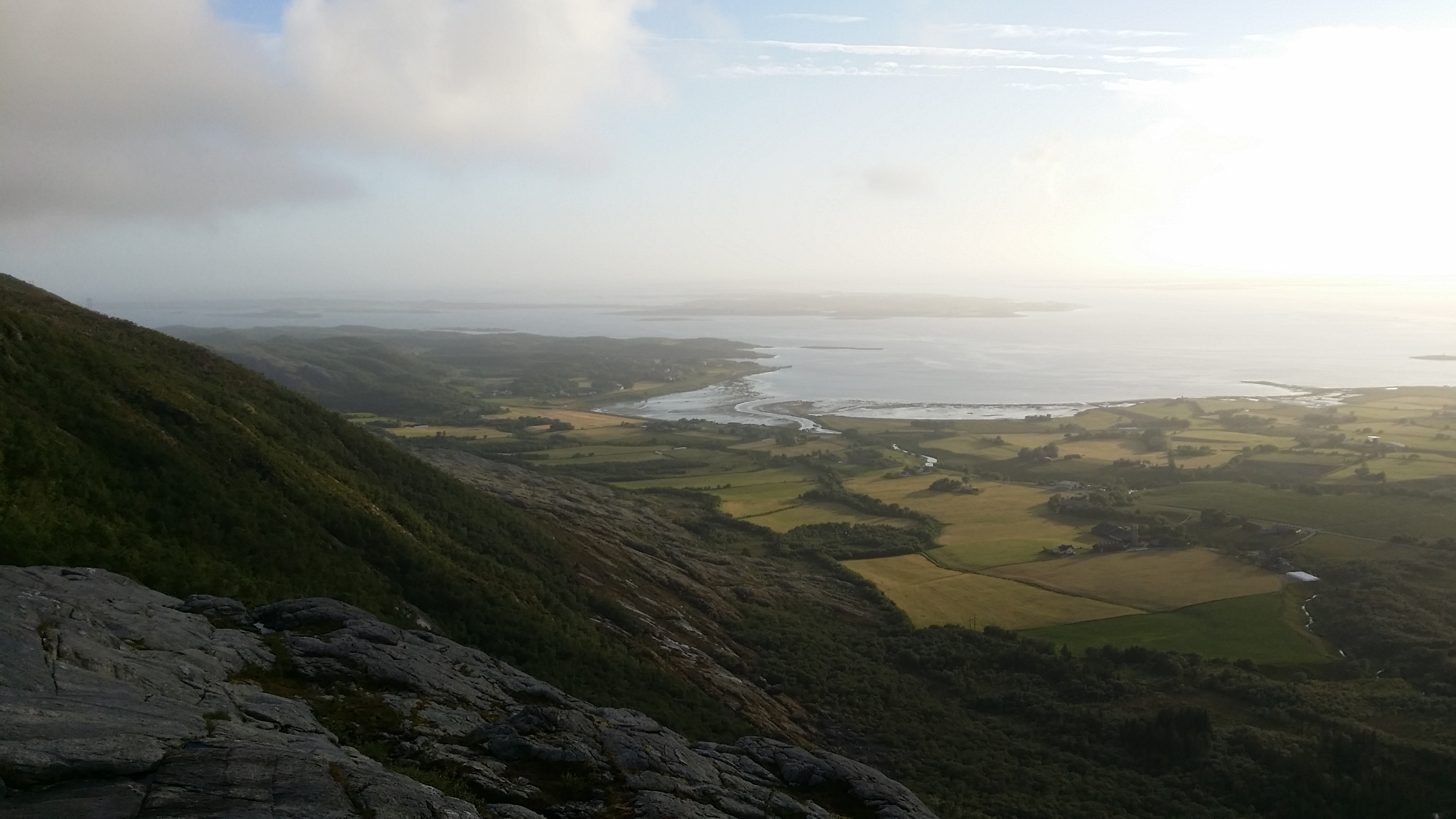
- View of the village, looking west
- Interactive map of Søvika
- Location within Nordland Location within Norway
- Coordinates: 65.92433°N 12.44599°E
- Country: Norway
- Region: Northern Norway
- County: Nordland
- District: Helgeland
- Municipality: Alstahaug Municipality
- Elevation: 21 m (69 ft)
- Time zone: UTC+01:00 (CET)
  - Summer (DST): UTC+02:00 (CEST)
- Post Code: 8804 Sandnessjøen

Søvika is a village in Alstahaug Municipality in Nordland county, Norway. The village is located on the southwestern shore of the island of Alsta, about 12 kilometres (7.5 mi) south of the town of Sandnessjøen. In 2001, there were 272 residents in the village.

The historic Alstahaug Church is located about 3 kilometres (1.9 mi) south of the village at the Alstahaug farm. Historically, Søvika was the administrative centre of Alstahaug Municipality from its establishment until 1965 when the administration was moved to Sandnessjøen after a municipal merger. The village is the site of local primary and secondary schools.

The village has a ferry quay with regular routes to the nearby islands of Altra and Sør-Herøy.
