= Alsta =

Island in Nordland, Norway

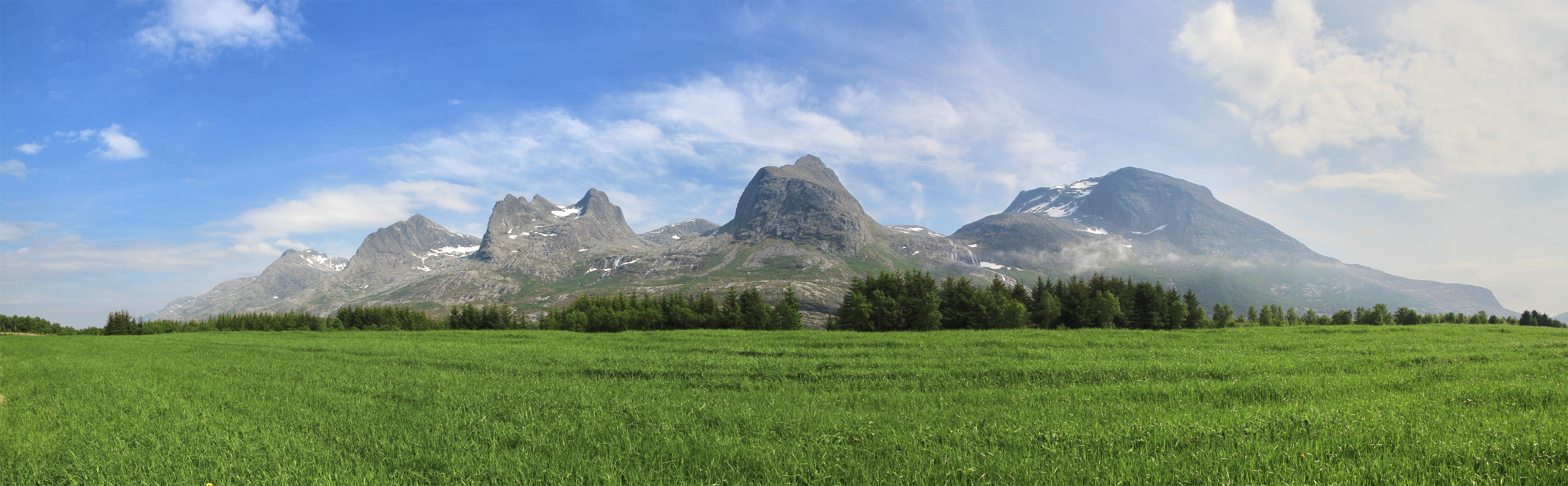
- Interactive map of Alsta
- Other names: Alsten (historic name); Alstein (historic name)

Geography
- Location: Nordland, Norway
- Coordinates: 65.96667°N 12.614722°E
- Area: 152.6 km^{2} (58.9 sq mi)
- Length: 30 km (19 mi)
- Width: 8 km (5 mi)
- Highest elevation: 1,072 m (3517 ft)
- Highest point: Botnkrona

Administration
- Norway
- County: Nordland
- Municipalities: Alstahaug Municipality and Leirfjord Municipality

Demographics
- Population: 6,969 (2017)

Alsta is an island in Alstahaug Municipality and Leirfjord Municipality in Nordland county, Norway. The island is surrounded by Vefsnfjorden to the east, Leirfjorden to the north, and Alstenfjorden to the south and west. The eastern part of the island is dominated by the Seven Sisters mountain range (Norwegian: De syv søstre) consisting of seven mountains, five of them taller than 1,000 metres (3,300 ft). The western part of the island is relatively flat and is the location of the town of Sandnessjøen in the north and the village of Søvika in the south. Historically, the island was known as Alsten or Alstein.

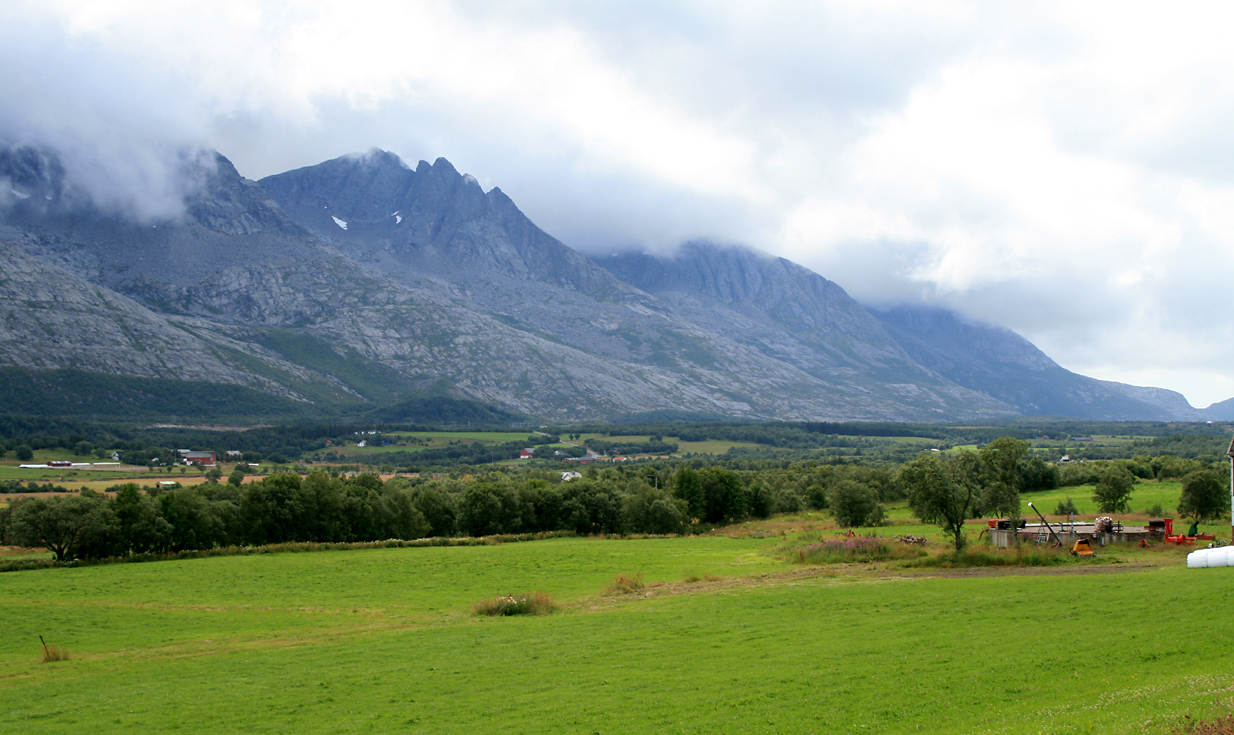
Lowland near the Seven Sisters mountains

The 30-kilometre (19 mi) long island has an area of 152.6 square kilometres (58.9 sq mi), and its highest point is the mountain Botnkrona, which reaches 1,072 metres (3,517 ft) above sea level. In 2017, there were 6,969 residents on the island. The islands of Altra and Skålværet lie to the southwest, the islands of Tjøtta, Offersøya, Mindlandet, and Rødøya lie to the south, surrounding the entrance to the Vefsnfjorden.

The island is connected to the mainland by the Helgeland Bridge on Norwegian County Road 17, which connects the northern part of the island to Leirfjord Municipality on the mainland. This same highway 17 continues across the island from north to south where it then connects by bridge to the nearby islands of Offersøya and Tjøtta.

The eastern part of the island is often called the "backside" of the island since it is on the other side of the mountains from the more populous side. This "backside" lies inside Leirfjord Municipality and the Sundøy Bridge connects the Sundøya village area on the backside of the island to the mainland.

== See also ==
- List of islands of Norway
