= Søvik =

Søvik or Søvika may refer to:

== Places ==
- Søvik, Agder, a village in Kristiansand Municipality, Agder county, Norway
- Søvik, Haram, a village in Ålesund Municipality, Møre og Romsdal county, Norway
- Søvik, Møre og Romsdal, a village in Sykkylven Municipality, Møre og Romsdal county, Norway
- Søvik, Vestland, a village in Bjørnafjorden Municipality, Vestland county, Norway
- Søvika, a village in Alstahaug Municipality, Nordland county, Norway
