= Rødøy =

Rødøy may refer to:

== Places ==
- Rødøy Municipality, a municipality in Nordland county, Norway
- Rødøya, an island within Rødøy Municipality in Nordland county, Norway
- Rødøy Church, a church in Rødøy Municipality in Nordland county, Norway
- Rødøya, Alstahaug, an island in Alstahaug Municipality in Nordland county, Norway
- Rødøya, Troms, an island in Kvænangen Municipality in Troms county, Norway
