= Sandnessjøen Municipality =

Former municipality in Nordland, Norway

Sandnessjøen Municipality Sandnessjøen herred
- Former municipality
- Stamnes herred (historic name)
- Nordland within Norway

- Sandnessjøen within Nordland
- Coordinates: 66.0181°N 12.6159°E
- Country: Norway
- County: Nordland
- District: Helgeland
- Established: 1 July 1899
  - Preceded by: Alstahaug Municipality
- Disestablished: 1 Jan 1965
  - Succeeded by: Alstahaug Municipality
- Administrative centre: Sandnessjøen

Area (upon dissolution)
  - Total: 44.9 km^{2} (17.3 sq mi)
  - Rank: #473 in Norway
- Highest elevation: 1,072 m (3,517 ft)

Population (1964)
  - Total: 3,753
  - Rank: #254 in Norway
  - Density: 83.6/km^{2} (217/sq mi)
  - Change (10 years): ▲ +44.9%
- Demonym: Sandnessjøværing

Official language
  - Norwegian form: Neutral
- Time zone: UTC+01:00 (CET)
  - Summer (DST): UTC+02:00 (CEST)
- ISO 3166 code: NO-1821

Sandnessjøen (historically named Stamnes) is a former municipality in Nordland county, Norway. The 45-square-kilometre (17 sq mi) municipality existed from 1899 until its dissolution in 1965. The municipality encompassed the northern part of the island of Alsta in what is now Alstahaug Municipality. Originally, it (briefly) also included all of what is now Leirfjord Municipality as well. The administrative centre of the municipality was the town of Sandnessjøen.

Prior to its dissolution in 1965, the 45-square-kilometre (17 sq mi) municipality was the 473rd largest by area out of the 525 municipalities in Norway. Sandnessjøen Municipality was the 254th most populous municipality in Norway with a population of about 3,753. The municipality's population density was 83.6 inhabitants per square kilometre (217/sq mi) and its population had increased by 44.9% over the previous 10-year period.

== General information ==
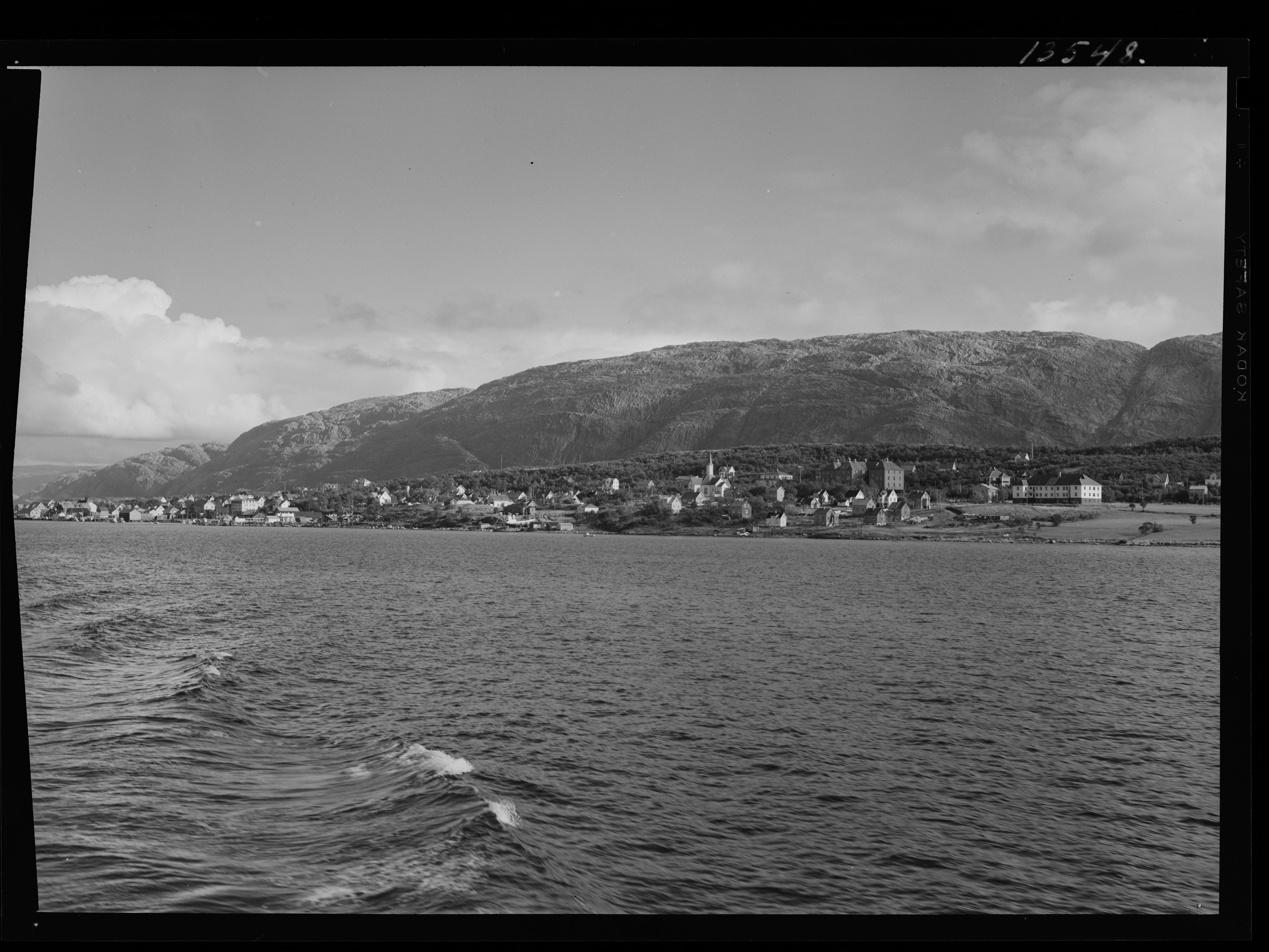
View of Sandnessjøen in the early 20th century

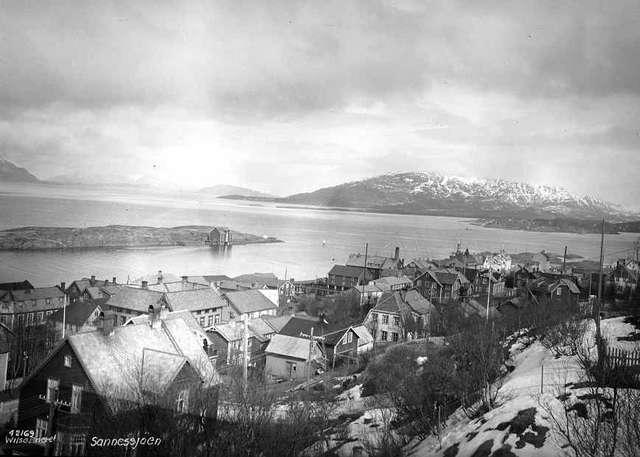
View of Sandnessjøen in 1935

The municipality of Stamnes was established on 1 July 1899 when the old Alstahaug Municipality was divided into two. Originally, it consisted of the northern part of the island of Alsta and the mainland area around the Leirfjorden. Initially, Stamnes Municipality had 2,673 residents. On 1 July 1915, the mainland district of Stamnes Municipality (population: 2,003) was separated to form the new Leirfjord Municipality. This left Stamnes Municipality with 1,059 residents.

In 1948, Stamnes Municipality was renamed Sandnessjøen Municipality, after Sandnessjøen, the main town in the small municipality. During the 1960s, there were many municipal mergers across Norway due to the work of the Schei Committee. On 1 January 1965, Sandnessjøen Municipality (population: 3,856) was merged with most of Alstahaug Municipality (population: 970) and most of Tjøtta Municipality (population: 1,477) to form a new, larger Alstahaug Municipality.

=== Name ===
The municipality is named after the old Stamnes farm (Old Norse: Stafnnes) since the first Stamnes Church was built there. The first element is stafn which is the word for the "mast/stem of a ship". The last element is nes which means "headland". Thus it is referring to the large mast-like peninsula on which the village of Stamnes was located.

On 1 July 1948, a royal resolution changed the name of the municipality to Sandnessjøen, after the main town in the municipality. The town was named after the old Sandnes farm (Old Norse: Sandnes) since the town grew up on the grounds of the old farm. The first element is sand which means "sand". The second element is nes which means "headland". The last element (-sjøen) was added on after the name of the farm. This word sjøen which means "the sea", thus it is the "sandy peninsula along the sea".

=== Churches ===
The Church of Norway had one parish (sokn) within Sandnessjøen Municipality. At the time of the municipal dissolution, it was part of the Alstahaug prestegjeld and the Nord-Helgeland prosti (deanery) in the Diocese of Sør-Hålogaland.

Churches in Sandnessjøen Municipality
| Parish (sokn) | Church name | Location of the church | Year built |
|---|---|---|---|
| Sandnessjøen | Sandnessjøen Church | Sandnessjøen | 1882 |

== Geography ==
The highest point in the municipality was the 1,072-metre (3,517 ft) tall mountain Botnkrona, part of the De syv søstre on the border with Alstahaug Municipality.

== Government ==
While it existed, Sandnessjøen Municipality was responsible for primary education (through 10th grade), outpatient health services, senior citizen services, welfare and other social services, zoning, economic development, and municipal roads and utilities. The municipality was governed by a municipal council of directly elected representatives. The mayor was indirectly elected by a vote of the municipal council. The municipality was under the jurisdiction of the Hålogaland Court of Appeal.

=== Municipal council ===
The municipal council (Herredsstyre) of Sandnessjøen Municipality was made up of 21 representatives that were elected to four year terms. The tables below show the historical composition of the council by political party.

Sandnessjøen herredsstyre 1963–1964
| Party name (in Norwegian) | Number of representatives |
|---|---|
| Labour Party (Arbeiderpartiet) | 12 |
| Conservative Party (Høyre) | 5 |
| Christian Democratic Party (Kristelig Folkeparti) | 1 |
| Centre Party (Senterpartiet) | 2 |
| Socialist People's Party (Sosialistisk Folkeparti) | 1 |
| Total number of members: | 21 |
Note: On 1 January 1965, Sandnessjøen Municipality became part of Alstahaug Municipality.

Sandnessjøen herredsstyre 1959–1963
| Party name (in Norwegian) | Number of representatives |
|---|---|
| Labour Party (Arbeiderpartiet) | 12 |
| Conservative Party (Høyre) | 5 |
| Christian Democratic Party (Kristelig Folkeparti) | 1 |
| Centre Party (Senterpartiet) | 1 |
| Liberal Party (Venstre) | 2 |
| Total number of members: | 21 |

Sandnessjøen herredsstyre 1955–1959
| Party name (in Norwegian) | Number of representatives |
|---|---|
| Labour Party (Arbeiderpartiet) | 12 |
| Conservative Party (Høyre) | 4 |
| Christian Democratic Party (Kristelig Folkeparti) | 1 |
| Liberal Party (Venstre) | 2 |
| Local List(s) (Lokale lister) | 2 |
| Total number of members: | 21 |

Sandnessjøen herredsstyre 1951–1955
| Party name (in Norwegian) | Number of representatives |
|---|---|
| Labour Party (Arbeiderpartiet) | 8 |
| Conservative Party (Høyre) | 4 |
| Christian Democratic Party (Kristelig Folkeparti) | 1 |
| Liberal Party (Venstre) | 2 |
| Local List(s) (Lokale lister) | 1 |
| Total number of members: | 16 |

Sandnessjøen herredsstyre 1947–1951
| Party name (in Norwegian) | Number of representatives |
|---|---|
| Labour Party (Arbeiderpartiet) | 6 |
| Conservative Party (Høyre) | 4 |
| Liberal Party (Venstre) | 4 |
| Local List(s) (Lokale lister) | 2 |
| Total number of members: | 16 |

Stamnes herredsstyre 1945–1947
| Party name (in Norwegian) | Number of representatives |
|---|---|
| Labour Party (Arbeiderpartiet) | 8 |
| Conservative Party (Høyre) | 2 |
| Liberal Party (Venstre) | 3 |
| Local List(s) (Lokale lister) | 3 |
| Total number of members: | 16 |

Stamnes herredsstyre 1937–1941*
| Party name (in Norwegian) | Number of representatives |
|---|---|
| Labour Party (Arbeiderpartiet) | 4 |
| Conservative Party (Høyre) | 5 |
| Liberal Party (Venstre) | 3 |
| Local List(s) (Lokale lister) | 4 |
| Total number of members: | 16 |
Note: Due to the German occupation of Norway during World War II, no elections were held for new municipal councils until after the war ended in 1945.

=== Mayors ===
The mayor (Norwegian: ordfører) of Sandnessjøen Municipality was the political leader of the municipality and the chairperson of the municipal council. Here is a list of people who held this position:

- 1899–1910: M. Fiskenæs
- 1911–1916: Einar Barth-Heyerdahl
- 1916–1919: Kristian Forfang
- 1919–1923: Albert Larssen
- 1923–1926: John Tønnessen
- 1926–1934: Marius Sørensen
- 1935–1941: Olaf Rokseth
- 1941–1943: Eilif Spjeldnes
- 1943–1945: Thorvald O. Wiig
- 1945–1945: R. Bakke
- 1946–1955: Harry Jørgensen (Ap)
- 1955–1963: Ivar Refseth (Ap)
- 1963–1964: Håkon Hansen (Ap)

== See also ==
- List of former municipalities of Norway
