= Blomsøya =

Island in Alstahaug Municipality, Norway

- Interactive map of Blomsøya

Geography
- Location: Nordland, Norway
- Coordinates: 65.8768°N 12.2713°E

Administration
- Norway
- County: Nordland
- Municipality: Alstahaug Municipality

Blomsøya is an island in Alstahaug Municipality, in Nordland, Norway. Together with neighboring islands of Altra and Hestøya, it now forms one continuous landmass with Blomsøya occupying the central part of this landmass. The three islands were historically separated but became connected through postglacial land uplift. The island is connected by road to both Altra and Hestøya through country road Fv7270, which is named Blomsøyveien on Blomsøya.

== Geography and nature ==
Blomsøya is located on the coast of Helgeland. The landscape consists of low hills with plains in between, with many bays and coves. The plains were formed by marine deposits, mostly by shell sand. The vegetation on the island is a mixture of several different types of natural ecosystems, including forests, coastal vegetation, heath, farmland meadows and wetlands. The bedrock on the island is also calcareous, and consists of a mixture of different metamorphic rocks, including calcite marble, calc-silicate gneiss and schist, and mica schist.

== History ==
According to a 1989 article by Jarle E. Henriksen in Helgelands Blad, the first part of today's Blomsøya to rise above sea level was Storåsen, which was above sea level around 6,500 years ago. Over time, land uplift caused more land to appear, eventually connecting the islands together, forming the larger landmass that today includes Hestøya, Blomsøya and Altra. Henriksen argued that because Storåsen on Blomsøya was the first part of the present-day island area to emerge, the name Blomsøya should apply to the entire island group rather than only the settlement of Blomsøy. As the island became suitable for settlement, people began to live and work on Blomsøya. Traditionally, life on Blomsøya was based on farming and fishing. Daily activities included agriculture, fishing and the use of boats. During the 1880s and 1890s, the village of Blomsøy consisted of six farms. Around that time, the farms typically kept animals such as cattle, horses and sheep.

== Cultural landscape ==
In 2010, Blomsøy, Hestøysund and Skålvær were selected as a national "Utvalgt kulturlandskap" in agriculture. The decision was based on both biological and cultural historical values, as well as the continued presence of active agricultural activity in the area. This was largely a result of the efforts of farmers on Blomsøya, who, through land clearing and the use of grazing animals, worked to maintain both the biological and experiential qualities of the landscapes.

== See also ==
- List of islands of Norway
