= Offersøya =

Island in Alstahaug, Norway

Offersøya Offersøy
- Interactive map of Offersøya; Offersøy

Geography
- Location: Nordland, Norway
- Coordinates: 65.8696°N 12.4766°E
- Area: 6.7 km^{2} (2.6 sq mi)
- Length: 6.3 km (3.91 mi)
- Width: 2 km (1.2 mi)
- Highest elevation: 43 m (141 ft)

Administration
- Norway
- County: Nordland
- Municipality: Alstahaug Municipality

Demographics
- Population: 61 (2016)

Offersøya is an island in Alstahaug Municipality in Nordland county, Norway. The 6.7-square-kilometre (2.6 sq mi) island lies directly between the large island of Alsta and the smaller island of Tjøtta at the mouth of the Vefsnfjorden. The Norwegian County Road 17 runs across the island connecting Alsta and Tjøtta. The island is relatively flat, with the highest point only reaching 43 metres (141 ft) above sea level. In 2016, there were 61 residents living on the island.

== See also ==
- List of islands of Norway
