= Andreas Grimsø =

Norwegian politician

- Born: 2 August 1917; Brønnøy Municipality, Norway
- Died: 3 January 2004 (aged 86)
- Occupation: Politician
- Political party: Conservative Party

Andreas Grimsø (2 August 1917 – 3 January 2004) was a Norwegian politician for the Conservative Party. A deputy representative, he met at the Storting from 1969 to 1971, and was mayor of Alstahaug Municipality from 1975 to 1983.

== Career ==
=== Parlament ===
He was elected deputy representative to the Storting for the period 1969–1973 for the Conservative Party. He replaced Håkon Kyllingmark at the Storting from October 1969 to March 1971.

=== Local politics ===
Grimsø was a member of the municipal council of the former Sandnessjøen Municipality from 1959 to 1964. In 1965 Sandessjøen merged into the larger Alstahaug Municipality, and Grimsø was a member of the municipal council of Alstahaug from 1965 to 1991, also serving as deputy mayor from 1965 to 1967, and mayor from 1975 to 1983.
