= ENST =

ENST may refer to:

- the former École nationale supérieure des telecommunications, nowadays Télécom Paris
- the former École nationale supérieure des télécommunications de Bretagne à Brest, nowadays Télécom Bretagne
- the École nationale supérieure de technologie in Algiers
- the École Nationale des Services du Trésor in Paris
- Sandnessjøen Airport, ICAO ENST, a regional airport in Norway
