= Sandnessjøen Airport =

Sandnessjøen Airport Sandnessjøen lufthavn

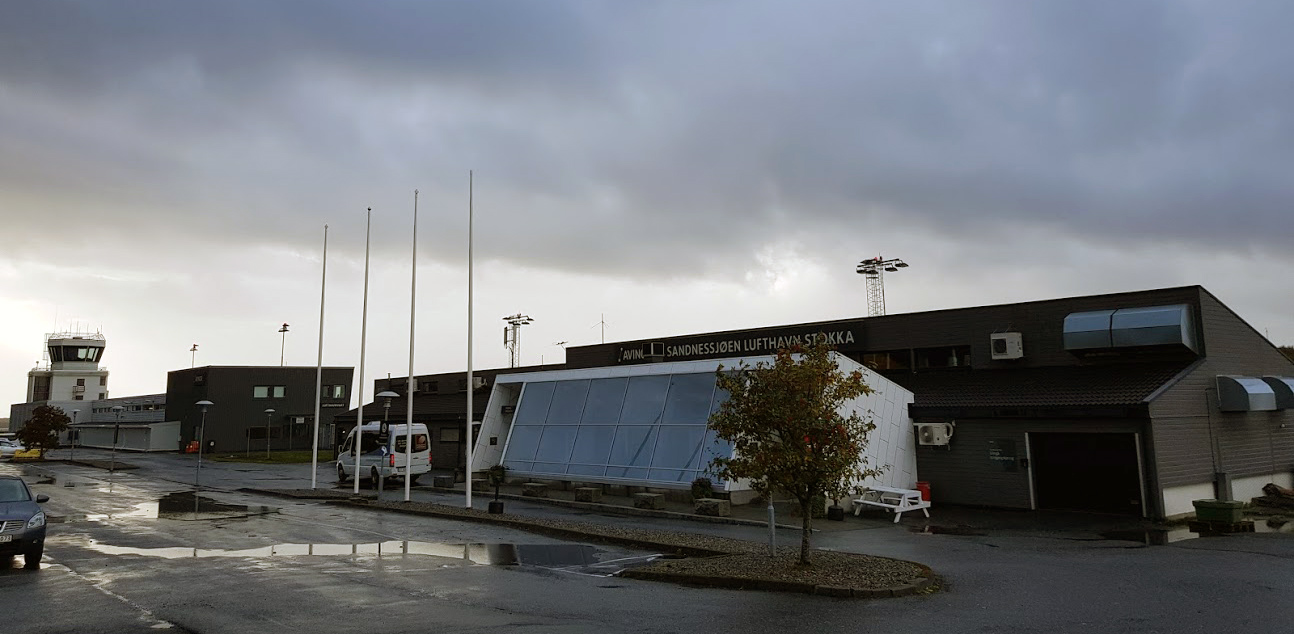
- IATA: SSJ; ICAO: ENST

Summary
- Airport type: Public
- Operator: Avinor
- Serves: Sandnessjøen, Nordland, Norway
- Location: Stokka, Alstahaug Municipality
- Elevation AMSL: 56 ft (17 m)
- Coordinates: 65°57′24″N 012°28′08″E
- Website: avinor.no

Map
- Location in Norway

Runways
Direction	Length		Surface
Direction	m	ft	Surface
02/20	1,409	4,623	Asphalt

Statistics (2014)
- Passengers: 74,138
- Aircraft movements: 6,627
- Cargo (tonnes): 197

Sandnessjøen Airport (Norwegian: Sandnessjøen lufthavn; IATA: SSJ, ICAO: ENST) is a regional airport serving the town of Sandnessjøen, Norway. The airport is located in Alstahaug Municipality in Nordland county, 5.5 nautical miles (10.2 km; 6.3 mi) south west of Sandnessjøen. In 2014, Sandnessjøen Airport served 74,138 passengers. It is operated by Avinor.

== Airlines and destinations ==
Sandnessjøen airport is served by Widerøe with Dash 8 aircraft connecting the community to Bodø, Trondheim and Oslo. The routes to Bodø and Trondheim are operated on public service obligation with the Norwegian Ministry of Transportation and Communication and have stopovers in Brønnøysund, Mo i Rana and Mosjøen.

On Monday, June 27, 2011, Widerøe started the route Oslo-Sandnessjøen. It was originally meant to be a summer service only, with four weekly departures from June 27 until August 14. The service was more popular than expected and from October 31 the same year Widerøe made the route a full year service with three weekly departures.

Airlines	Destinations
Widerøe	Bodø, Brønnøysund, Namsos, Oslo, Rørvik, Trondheim

== History ==
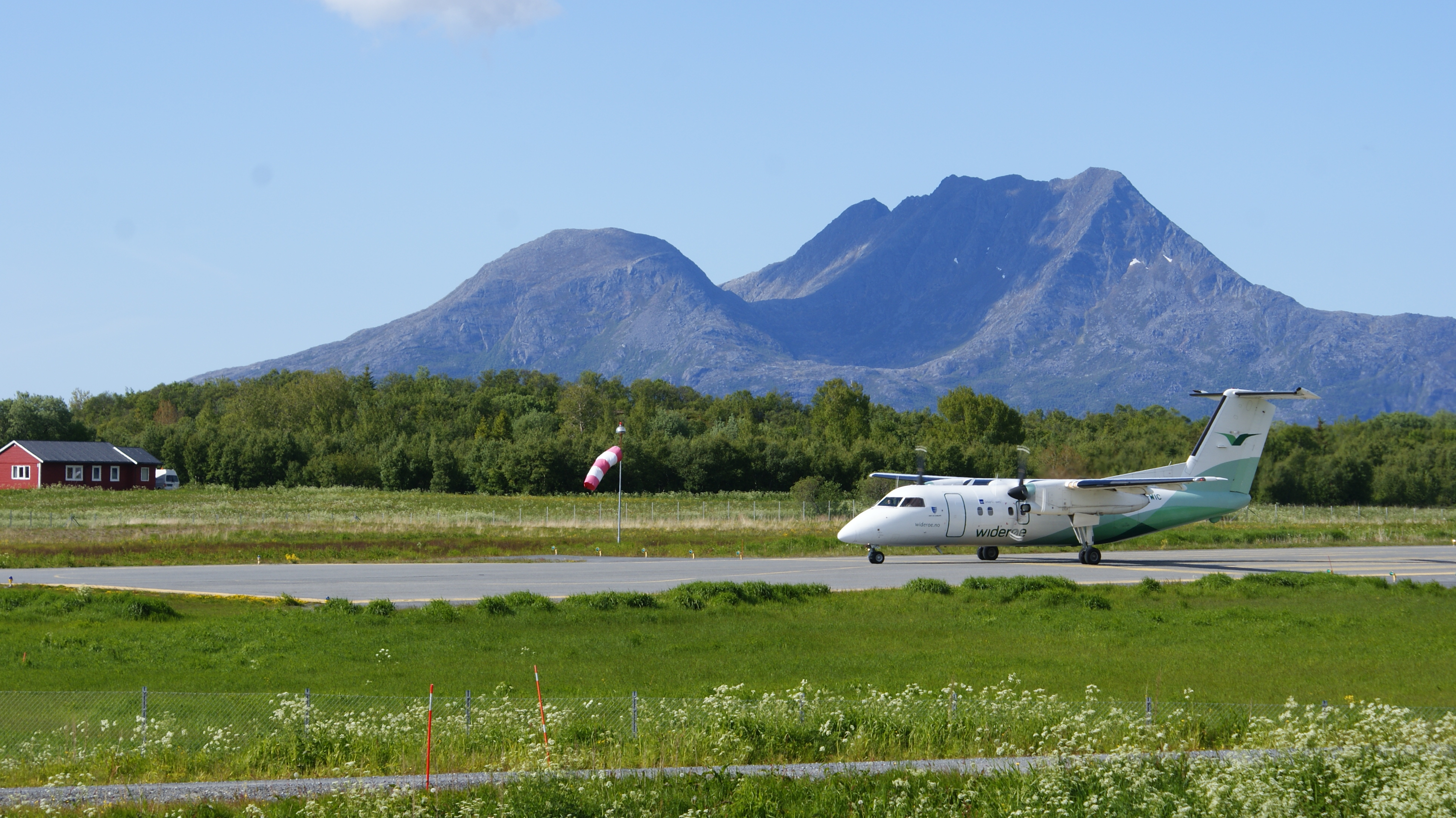
Widerøe de Havilland Canada Dash-8 103 taxiing before takeoff.

The first air route along the coast of western Norway between Bergen and Tromsø started June 7, 1935 using seaplanes with three weekly departures and stop overs in Ålesund, Molde, Kristiansund, Trondheim, Brønnøysund, Sandnessjøen, Bodø, Narvik and Harstad. Det Norske Luftfartsselskap (DNL) had exclusive rights for the route and initially flew it using a Junkers W 34 with floats called "Ternen". It soon became clear that the W 34 was too small and Summer 1936 DNL upgraded to a larger Junkers Ju 52 with floats. All flights were put on hold in 1940 during the Occupation of Norway by Nazi Germany. After the war DNL restarted the coastal route using the same equipment. Widerøe later took over the local coastal routes.

Since the float planes could only be operated during daylight and in good weather, a more stable air transport solution was deemed necessary as the volume of traffic steadily grew. The nearest airport was in Bodø, 5-6 hours drive with a ferry. To try out a new concept of regional airports, four towns along the Helgeland coast got airports in 1968 (Sandnessjøen, Namsos, Brønnøysund and Mo i Rana). July 1, 1968 Widerøe, having exclusive rights, started the Helgeland route with stop overs at all four towns between Trondheim and Bodø. The route was originally flown using Twin Otters.

In 2014 the runway was extended from 1086 to 1409 metres ("Takeoff Run Available" from 931 to 1199).

== Accidents and incidents ==
- On 15 September 2010, DHC-8-103B LN-WIF of Widerøes Flyveselskap was substantially damaged in a hard landing when the undercarriage collapsed. The aircraft was operating a domestic scheduled passenger flight from Bodø Airport.
- On 11 December 1970, Piper PA-32 Cherokee Six LN-BFG of Vikingfly crashed into the mountain of Stortind/Breitind in De syv søstre. The pilot and three passengers died. The aircraft was operating an ambulance flight.

== Statistics ==
Annual passenger traffic
Year	Passengers	% Change
2025	90,814	▲18.4%
2024	76,677	▲5.0%
2023	73,026	▲5.1%
2022	69,455	▲21.8%
2021	57,046	▲11.8%
2020	51,028	▼ -30.5%
2019	73,391	▼ -0.6%
2018	73,859	▼ -14.8%
2017	86,676	▼ -14.3%
2016	101,123	▼ -0.7%
2015	102,215	

== Ground transportation ==
The airport is located approximately 20 km (12 mi) south of the town of Sandnessjøen. One bus serves the airport, although there is no scheduled route. The bus service is on demand, with the passenger pick-up possible at any location inside Sandnessjøen. Taxis are also available.
