= Skålværet =

Island group in Nordland, Norway

- Interactive map of Skålværet

Geography
- Location: Nordland, Norway
- Coordinates: 65.8615°N 12.1762°E

Administration
- Norway
- County: Nordland
- Municipality: Alstahaug Municipality

Demographics
- Population: 0 (2007)

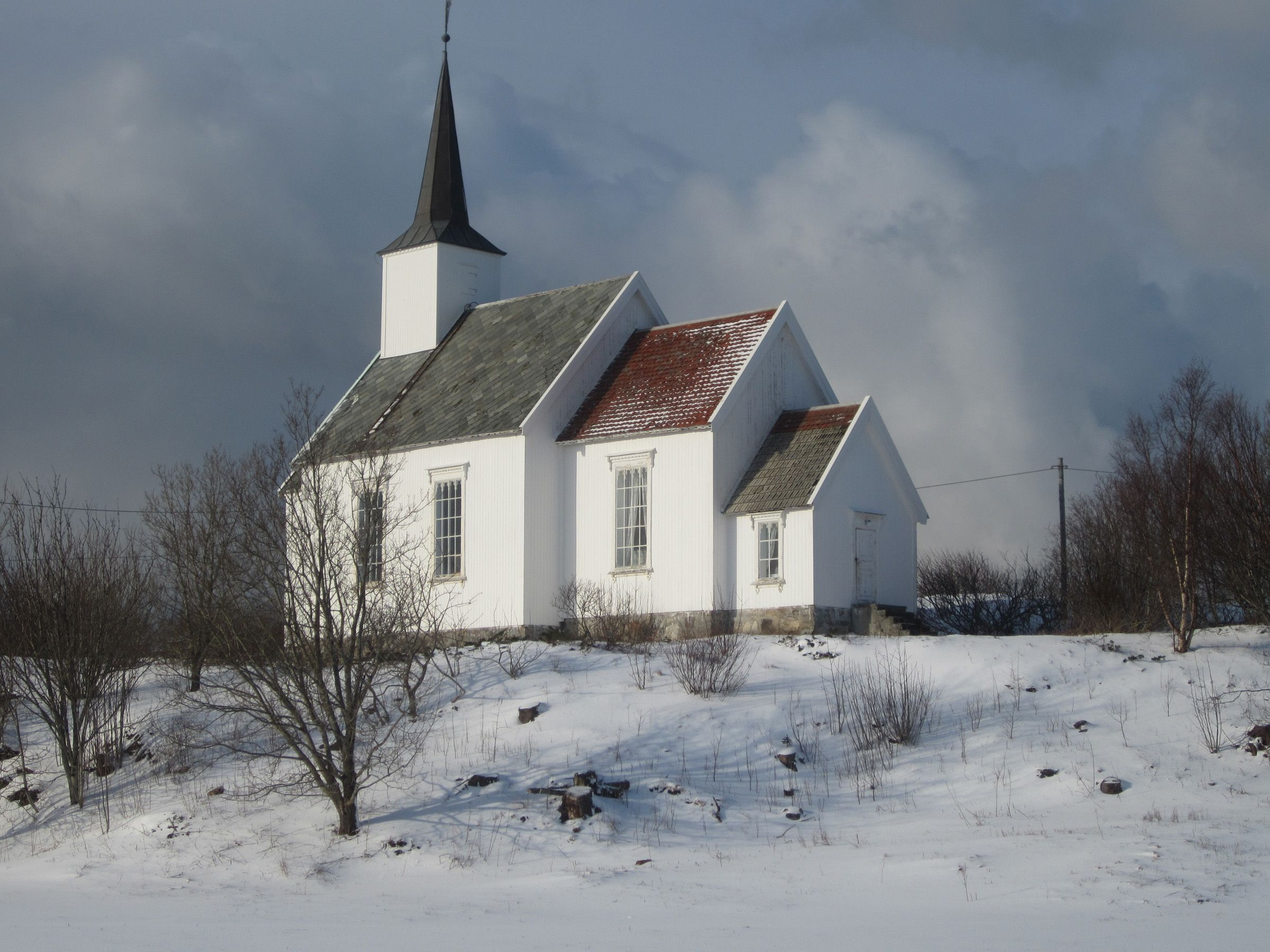
Skålvær Church

Skålværet are a group of islands in Alstahaug Municipality in Nordland county, Norway. The islands are located in the western part of Alstahaug, about 15 kilometres (9.3 mi) northwest of the island of Tjøtta, just west of the southern tip of the island of Altra, and about 15 kilometres (9.3 mi) south of the village of Silvalen (in Herøy Municipality). The islands were formerly a part of Vega Municipality, but in 1971 it was transferred to Alstahaug Municipality.

Skålværet was once a thriving trading post and had many residents, but it has since declined in importance. Today, much of Skålværet is an outdoor recreation area for Alstahaug Municipality. In addition, there are about fifteen private houses and cottages scattered around the main island. Since 2007, there are no longer any permanent residents on Skålværet, but the place is far from abandoned. Summer residents live on the island, and Skålvær Church holds services on the island infrequently.

== See also ==
- List of islands of Norway
