= Skålvær Church =

Church in Nordland, Norway

- Skålvær kirke
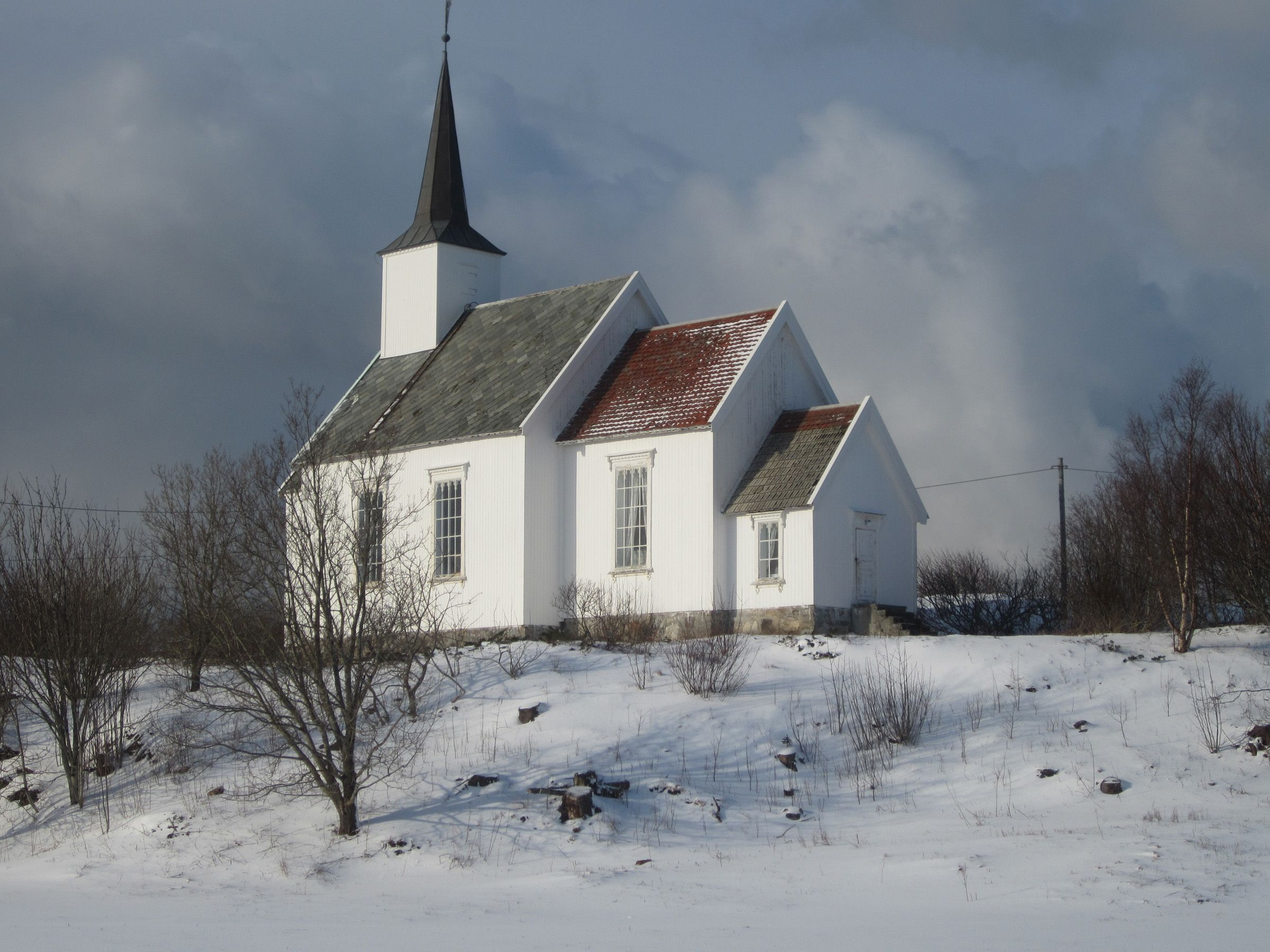
- View of the church
- Skålvær Church
- 65°51′48″N 12°10′25″E
- Location: Alstahaug Municipality, Nordland
- Country: Norway
- Denomination: Church of Norway
- Churchmanship: Evangelical Lutheran

History
- Status: Parish church
- Founded: 1889
- Consecrated: 6 Sept 1889

Architecture
- Functional status: Active
- Architect: Nils Kristian Andersen
- Architectural type: Long church
- Completed: 1889 (137 years ago)

Specifications
- Capacity: 200
- Materials: Wood

Administration
- Diocese: Sør-Hålogaland
- Deanery: Nord-Helgeland prosti
- Parish: Tjøtta
- Norwegian Cultural Heritage Site
- Type: Church
- Status: Not protected
- ID: 85488

Skålvær Church (Norwegian: Skålvær kirke) is a parish church of the Church of Norway in Alstahaug Municipality in Nordland county, Norway. It is located on the island of Skålvær. It is one of the churches for the Tjøtta parish which is part of the Nord-Helgeland prosti (deanery) in the Diocese of Sør-Hålogaland. The white, wooden church was built in a long church style in 1889 using plans drawn up by the architect Nils Kristian Andersen. The church seats about 200 people.

== History ==
In 1882, the people of Skålvær began talking and planning for a church in Skålvær. In 1888, the church building committee purchased the materials from the old Malm Church in Trøndelag. The old church was being replaced and most of the materials were still in good condition. Nils Kristian Andersen from Tjøtta was hired as the builder with the completion deadline of August 1889. The new building was consecrated on 6 September 1889. The parish decided that the church would have 11 worship services each year (roughly once per month). By the late 20th century, the population in Skålvær had declined significantly and most of the homes on the island are now used only as holiday cottages, so the church has been taken out of regular use. It is now used once or twice per summer to serve the vacationing residents of the island.

== See also ==
- List of churches in Sør-Hålogaland
