= Sandnessjøen =

Town in Alstahaug, Norway

- Town/City
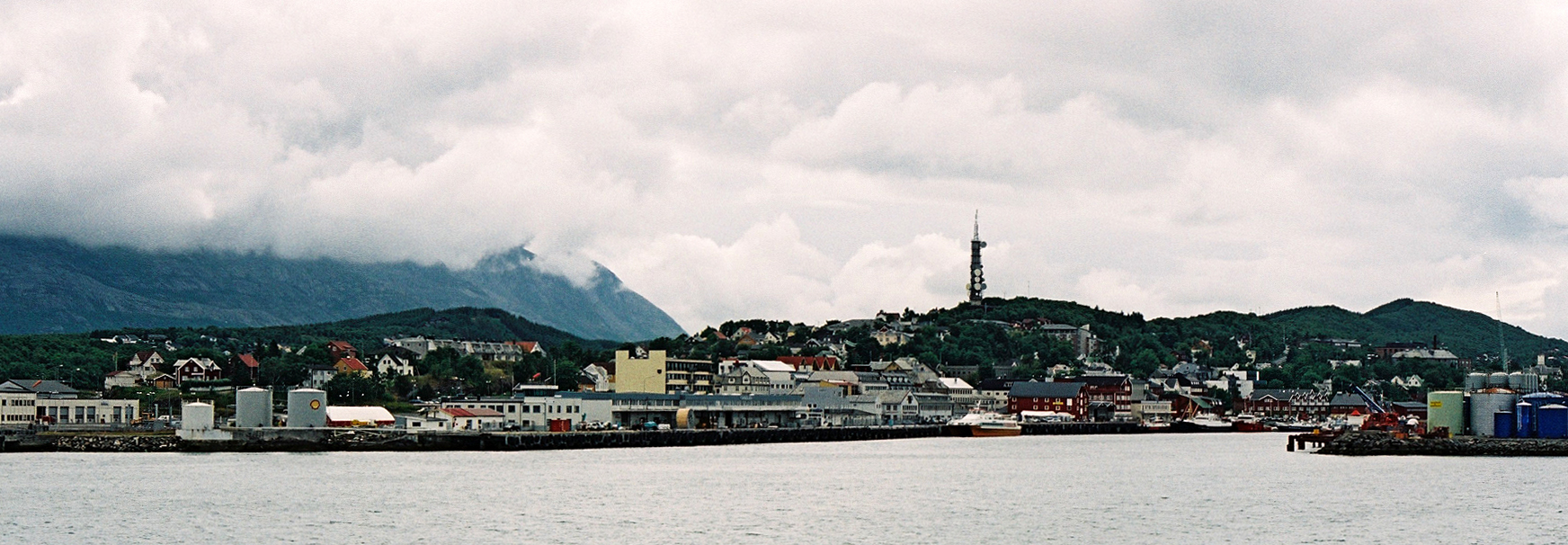
- View of the town
- Interactive map of Sandnessjøen
- Location within Nordland Location within Norway
- Coordinates: 66.0181°N 12.6159°E
- Country: Norway
- Region: Northern Norway
- County: Nordland
- District: Helgeland
- Municipality: Alstahaug Municipality
- Established as
- Town (By): 1999

Area
  - Total: 4.25 km^{2} (1.64 sq mi)
- Elevation: 20 m (66 ft)

Population (2024)
  - Total: 6,056
  - Density: 1,425/km^{2} (3,690/sq mi)
- Demonym: Sandnessjøværing
- Time zone: UTC+01:00 (CET)
  - Summer (DST): UTC+02:00 (CEST)
- Post Code: 8800 Sandnessjøen

Sandnessjøen is a town and the administrative centre of Alstahaug Municipality in Nordland county, Norway. Sandnessjøen was granted special trading privileges in the late 1600s, but it did not receive town status until 1999. Sandnessjøen is located on the west coast of the island of Alsta, just west of the De syv søstre (lit. 'The Seven Sisters') mountain range.

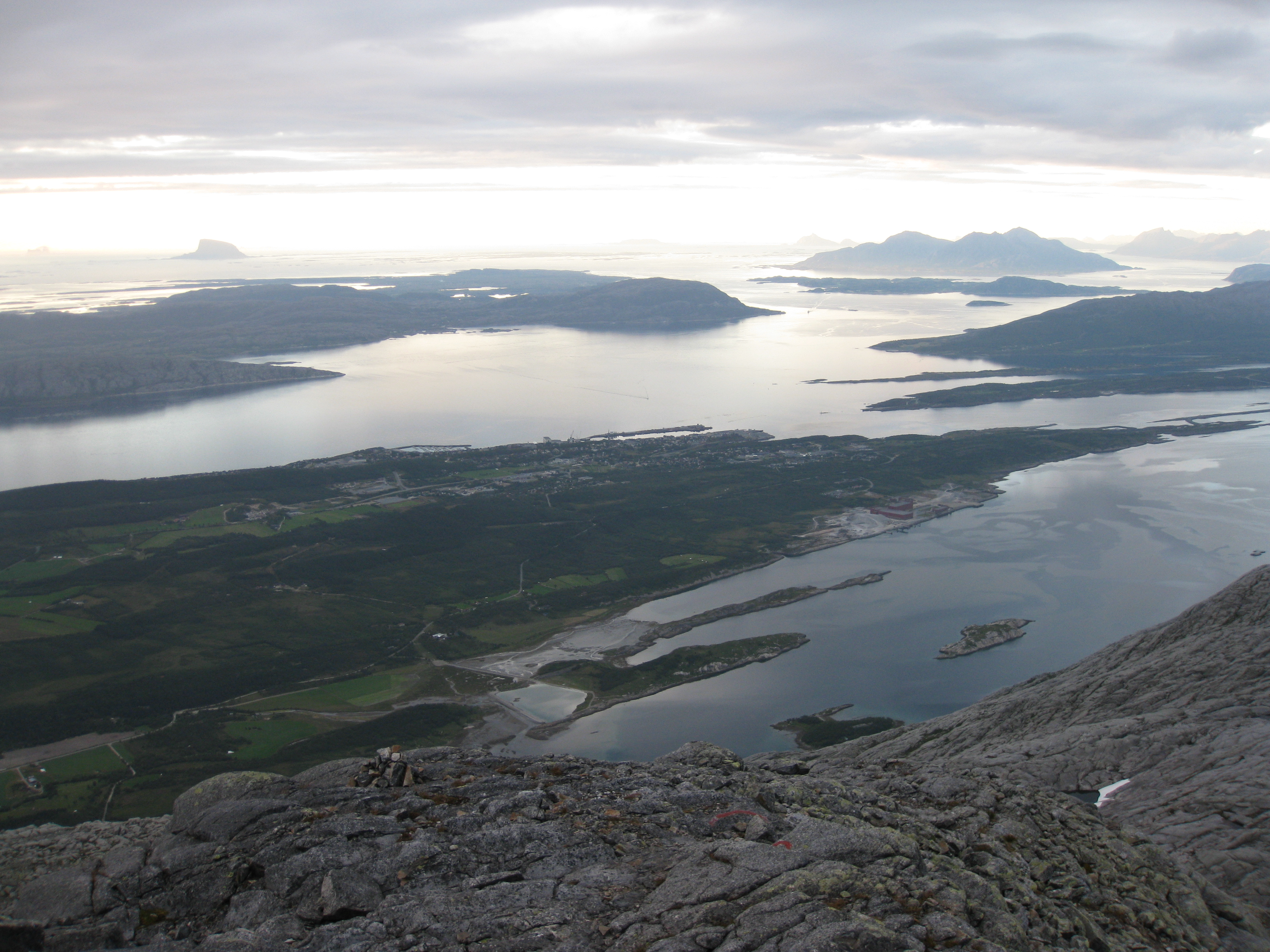
Sandnessjøen and surroundings seen from the summit of Botnkrona.

The town is a transportation hub for the Helgeland region, as well as a commercial and business centre for the region. The 4.25-square-kilometre (1,050-acre) town has a population (2024) of 6,056 and a population density of 1,425 inhabitants per square kilometre (3,690/sq mi).

Sandnessjøen Airport, Stokka is located south of the town. Beginning in late June 2011, the regional airline Widerøe launched direct flights in summer between Sandnessjøen Airport and Oslo Airport, Gardermoen.

== History ==
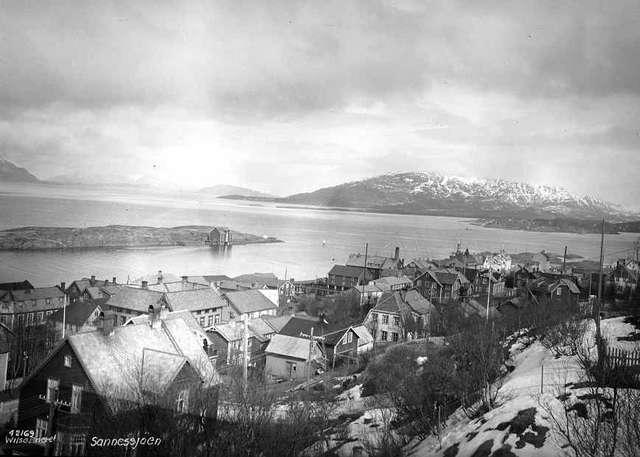
Sandnessjøen in 1935

The town of Sandnessjøen was the administrative centre of the old Sandnessjøen Municipality from 1899 to 1965 (it was known as Stamnes Municipality prior to 1948). In 1965, the municipality was dissolved and merged with Alstahaug Municipality.

Helgeland Kammerkor, a mixed choir with members drawn from the region of Helgeland, was founded in Sandnessjøen in 1992 and has held many concerts there.

== See also ==
- List of towns and cities in Norway
