= Gunnar Breimo =

Norwegian politician (1939–2024)

Gunnar Breimo (23 May 1939 – 16 December 2024) was a Norwegian politician for the Labour Party.

== Life and career ==
Breimo was elected to the Norwegian Parliament from Nordland in 1993, and was re-elected on one occasion. He was a member of the municipal council of Alstahaug Municipality from 1979 to 1993 and again from 2003 to 2007, serving as mayor from 1983 to 1993.

Breimo died at Sandnessjøen Hospital on 16 December 2024, at the age of 85.

== Sources ==
- "Gunnar Breimo" (in Norwegian). Storting.
