= Rødøya, Alstahaug =

Island in Nordland, Norway

Rødøya Røøya
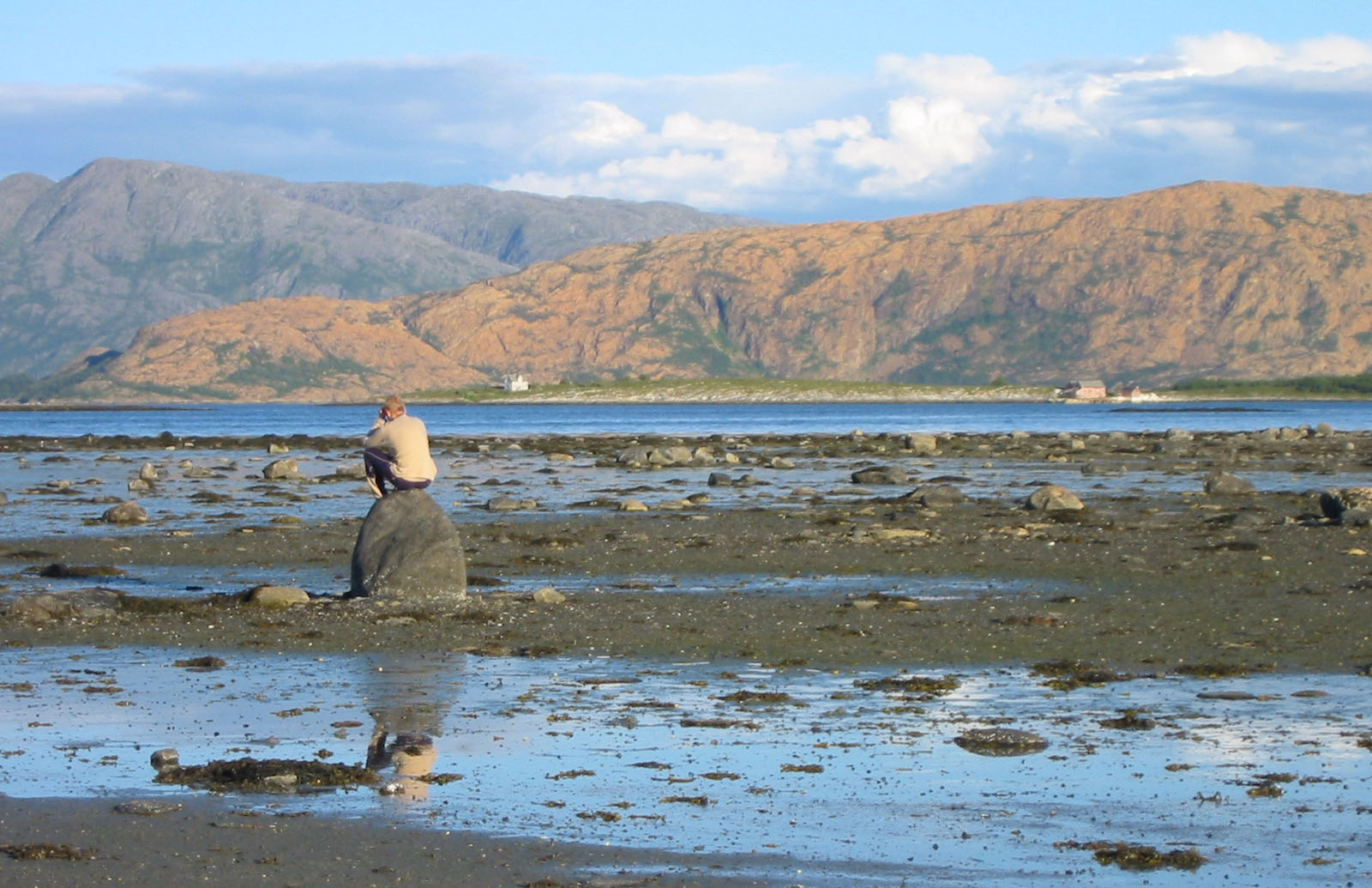
- Interactive map of Rødøya; Røøya

Geography
- Location: Nordland, Norway
- Coordinates: 65.8190°N 12.5499°E
- Area: 7.3 km^{2} (2.8 sq mi)
- Length: 7 km (4.3 mi)
- Width: 1.8 km (1.12 mi)
- Highest elevation: 307 m (1007 ft)
- Highest point: Rødøyfjellet

Administration
- Norway
- County: Nordland
- Municipality: Alstahaug Municipality

Demographics
- Population: 23 (2017)

Rødøya is an island in Alstahaug Municipality in Nordland county, Norway. The 7.3-square-kilometre (2.8 sq mi) island lies at the mouth of the Vefsnfjorden and the Halsfjorden. The island is home to 23 people (in 2017), living mostly on the southern part of the island.

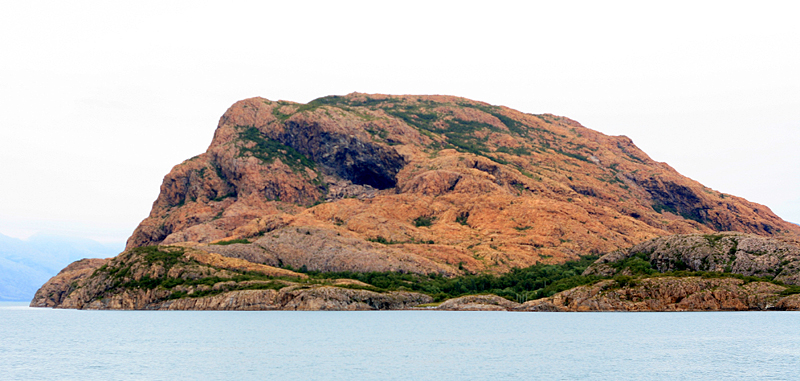
View of the red rock that makes up Rødøya

The island is mountainous, especially in the north where the 307-metre (1,007 ft) tall mountain Rødøyfjellet is located. The island is made up of a red-weathered serpentinite and chromium. The name of the island literally means "red island" in the Norwegian language, a name that was given because of the red color of the rocks.

The island is only accessible by boat and there are car ferry connections to the villages of Stokka and Forvika on the mainland in Vevelstad Municipality. There are also ferry connections to the nearby islands of Mindlandet (to the west) and Tjøtta (to the north). The ferry service from Vevelstad-Rødøya-Mindlandet-Tjøtta is included as part of the Norwegian County Road 17, a main highway on the Helgeland coast.

== History ==
Rødøya is known for its approximately 5000-year-old rock carvings showing a skier, probably the oldest evidence of skiing found anywhere in the world. These are located near the village of Tro on the southern part of the island. These petroglyphs were used as backgrounds during the 1994 Winter Olympics in Lillehammer. These rock carvings were heavily damaged by vandalism carried out by two youths in 2016.

== See also ==
- List of islands of Norway
