= Alstahaug Church =

Church in Nordland, Norway

- Alstahaug kirke
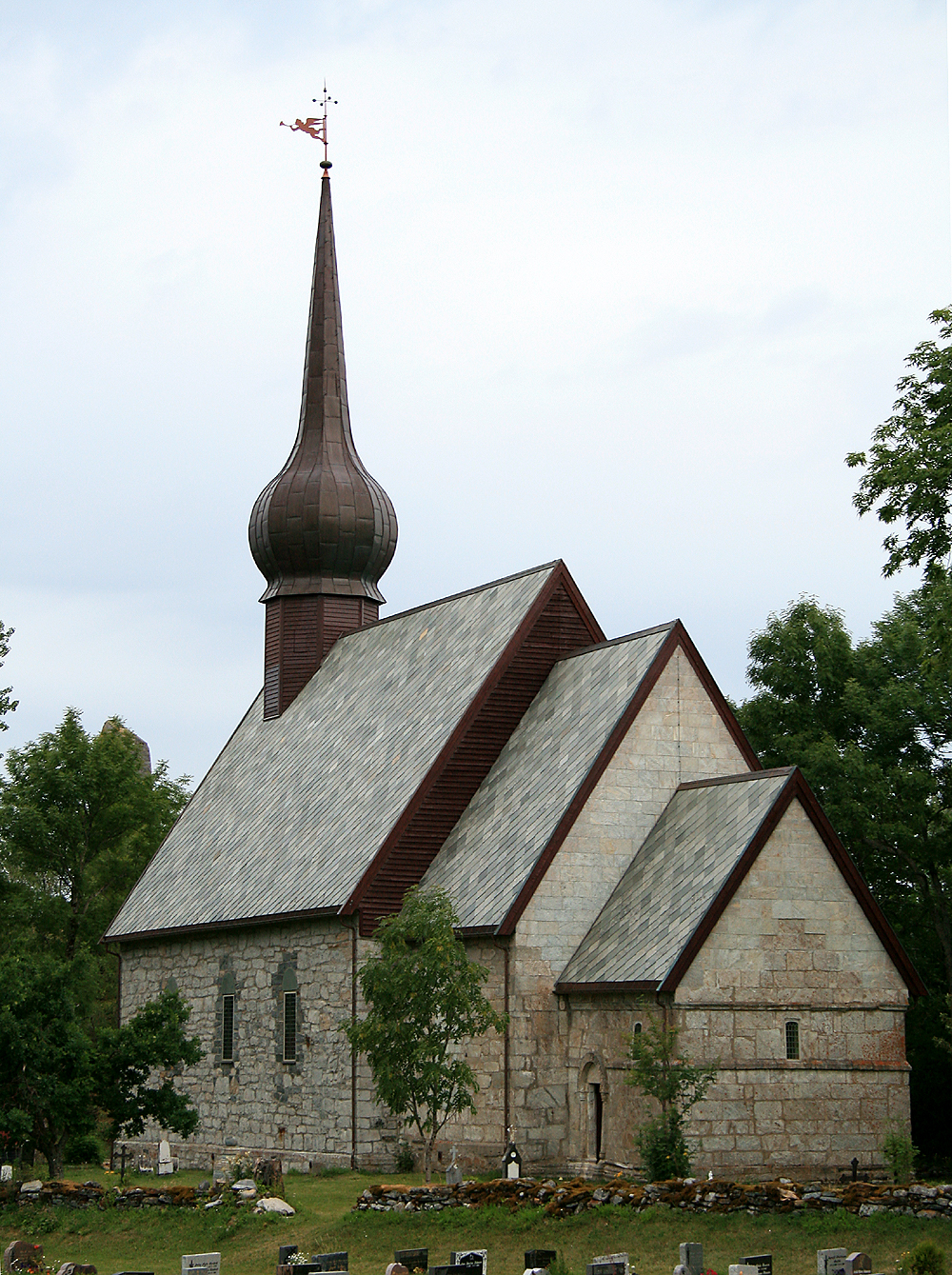
- View of the church
- Alstahaug Church
- 65°53′38″N 12°23′52″E
- Location: Alstahaug Municipality, Nordland
- Country: Norway
- Denomination: Church of Norway
- Previous denomination: Catholic Church
- Churchmanship: Evangelical Lutheran

History
- Former name: Haug kirke
- Status: Parish church
- Founded: 12th century
- Consecrated: 12th century

Architecture
- Functional status: Active
- Architectural type: Long church
- Style: Romanesque
- Completed: c. 1150 (876 years ago)

Specifications
- Capacity: 270
- Materials: Stone

Administration
- Diocese: Sør-Hålogaland
- Deanery: Nord-Helgeland prosti
- Parish: Alstahaug
- Norwegian Cultural Heritage Site
- Type: Church
- Status: Automatically protected
- ID: 83771

Alstahaug Church (Norwegian: Alstahaug kirke) is a parish church of the Church of Norway in Alstahaug Municipality in Nordland county, Norway. It is one of seven surviving medieval churches in northern Norway. Petter Dass was the vicar at this church from 1689 until his death in 1707.

The church is located at Alstahaug, a small peninsula on the southern end of the island of Alsta. It is the church for the parish of Alstahaug, which is part of the Nord-Helgeland deanery in the Diocese of Sør-Hålogaland. The stone church was built in a long church style in the 12th century. The church seats about 270 people.

== History ==
The Romanesque stone church has a rectangular nave and a narrower, almost square chancel where the width is greater than the length. In a first construction phase, the choir and the first 1 metre (3 ft 3 in) or so of the eastern part of the nave were built using locally sourced soapstone. In the next phase, the rest of the nave was completed. During archaeological excavations under the church, no evidence was found for any previous churches on this site.

From 1863 to 1865, the western portion of the old nave was torn down and a new, longer and wider nave was rebuilt on the same site. A new tower on the west end was also constructed. This renovation and expansion was led by the architect Niels Stockfleth Darre Eckhoff. The new addition became the nave, the part of the old nave that remained was converted into a choir, and the old choir was converted into a sacristy.

In the 1920s, the oldest choir was partially restored to its old form. A thorough restoration was begun in the late 1960s. The original sections were partly restored to their former appearance with smaller windows and steeper roof angles. The new nave from the 1860s got a shape and appearance reminiscent of the old nave. The west tower was removed and the church again got an onion dome over the roof ridge to the west. The church was reopened after the restoration on 21 June 1970.

Helgeland Kammerkor, a mixed choir from the district of Helgeland, used Alstahaug Church as the venue for a recording of folk music from Helgeland (Folketoner fra Helgeland, 2005). The album contains 27 folk tunes from Helgeland, recorded in collaboration with folk musicians from the area.

== Gallery ==
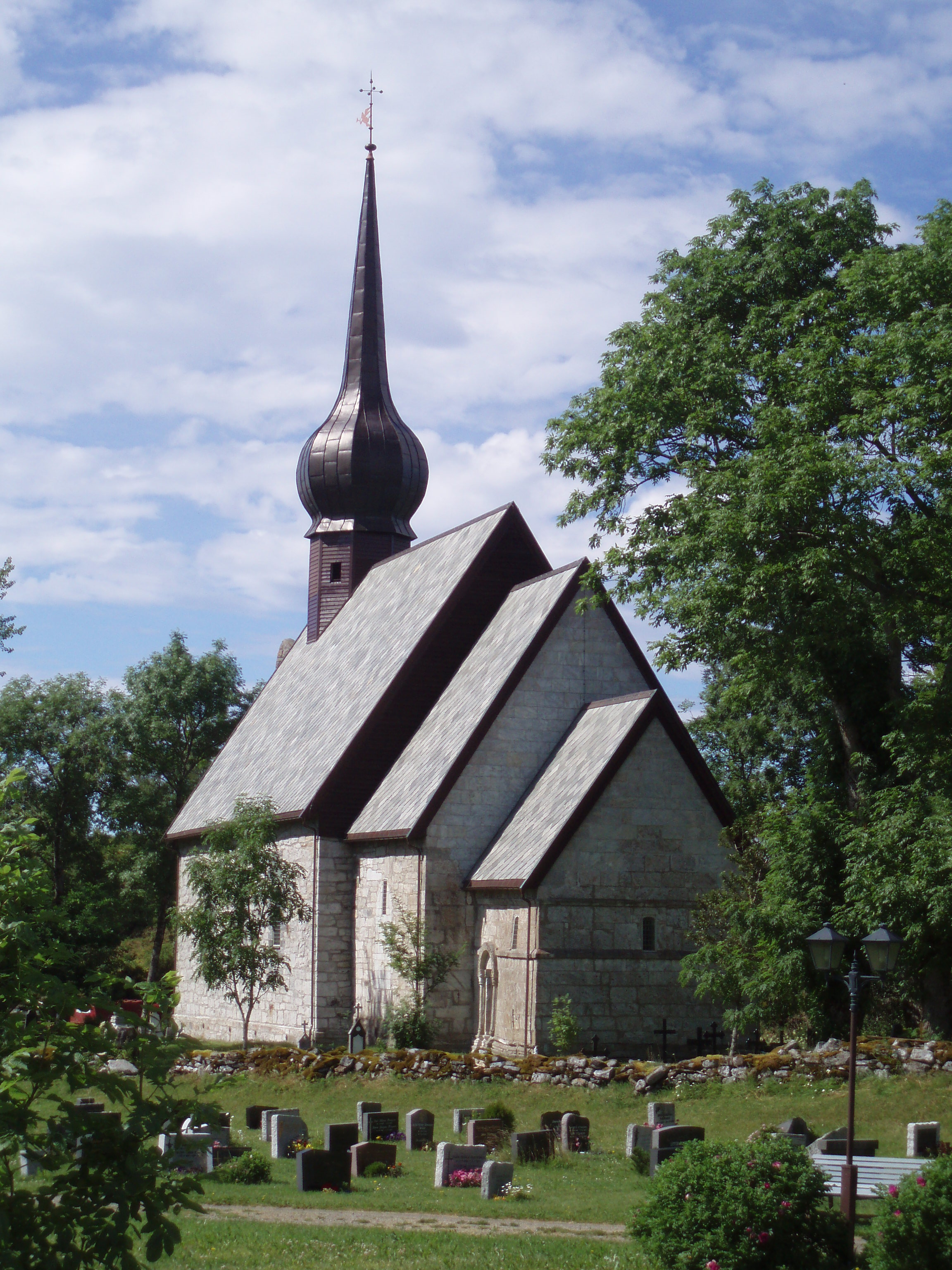
Exterior

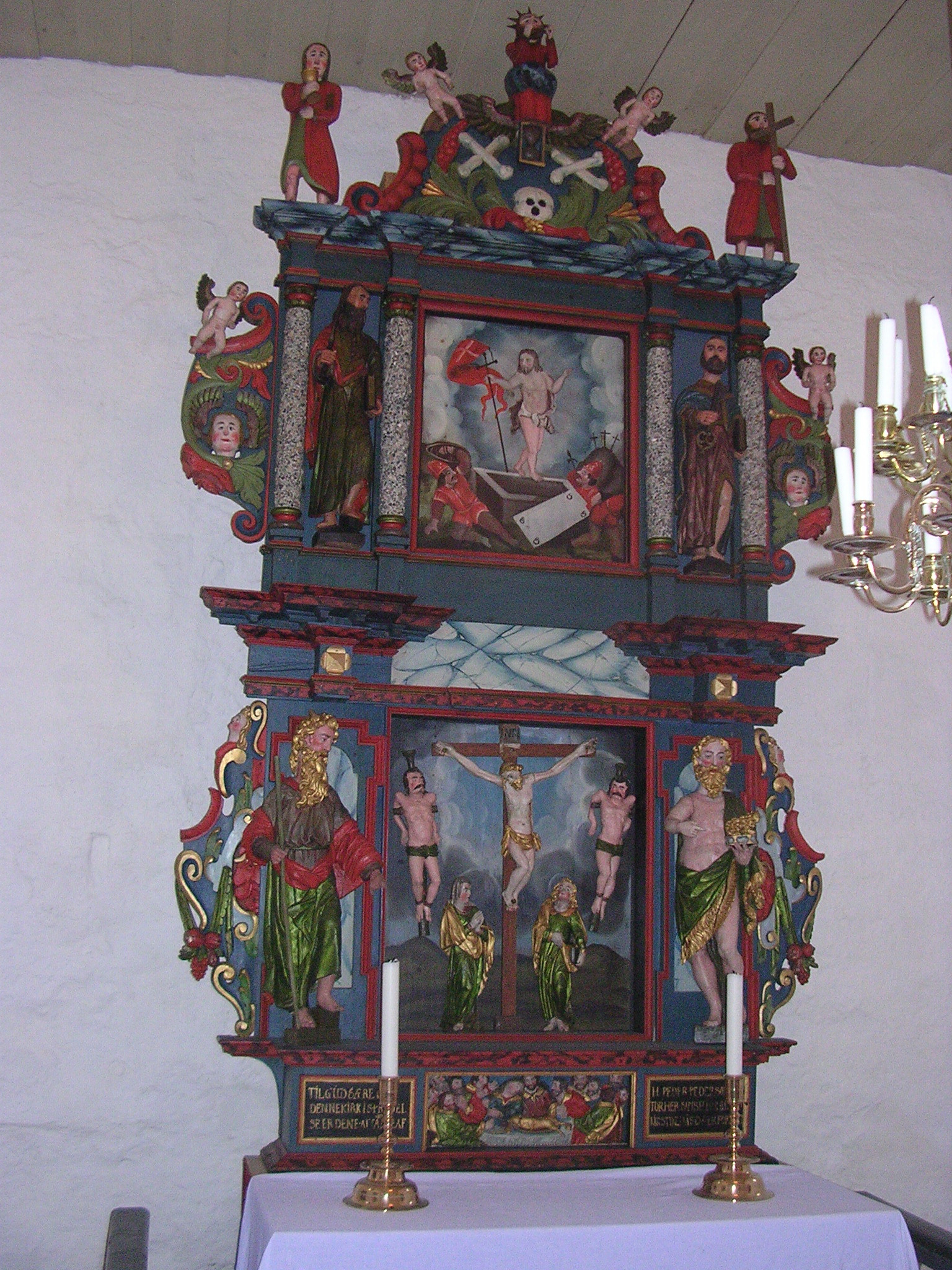
Church altarpiece

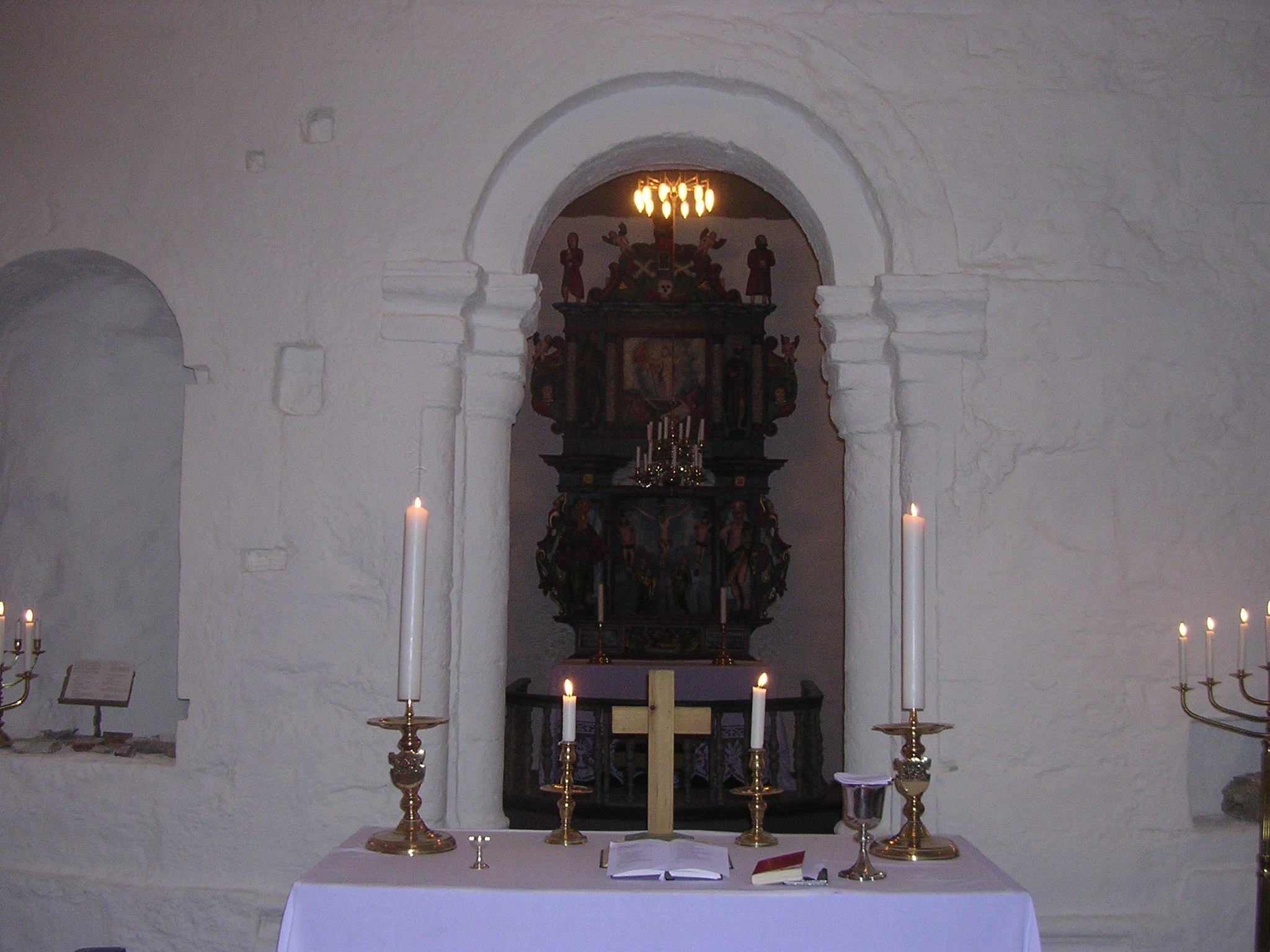
Church altar

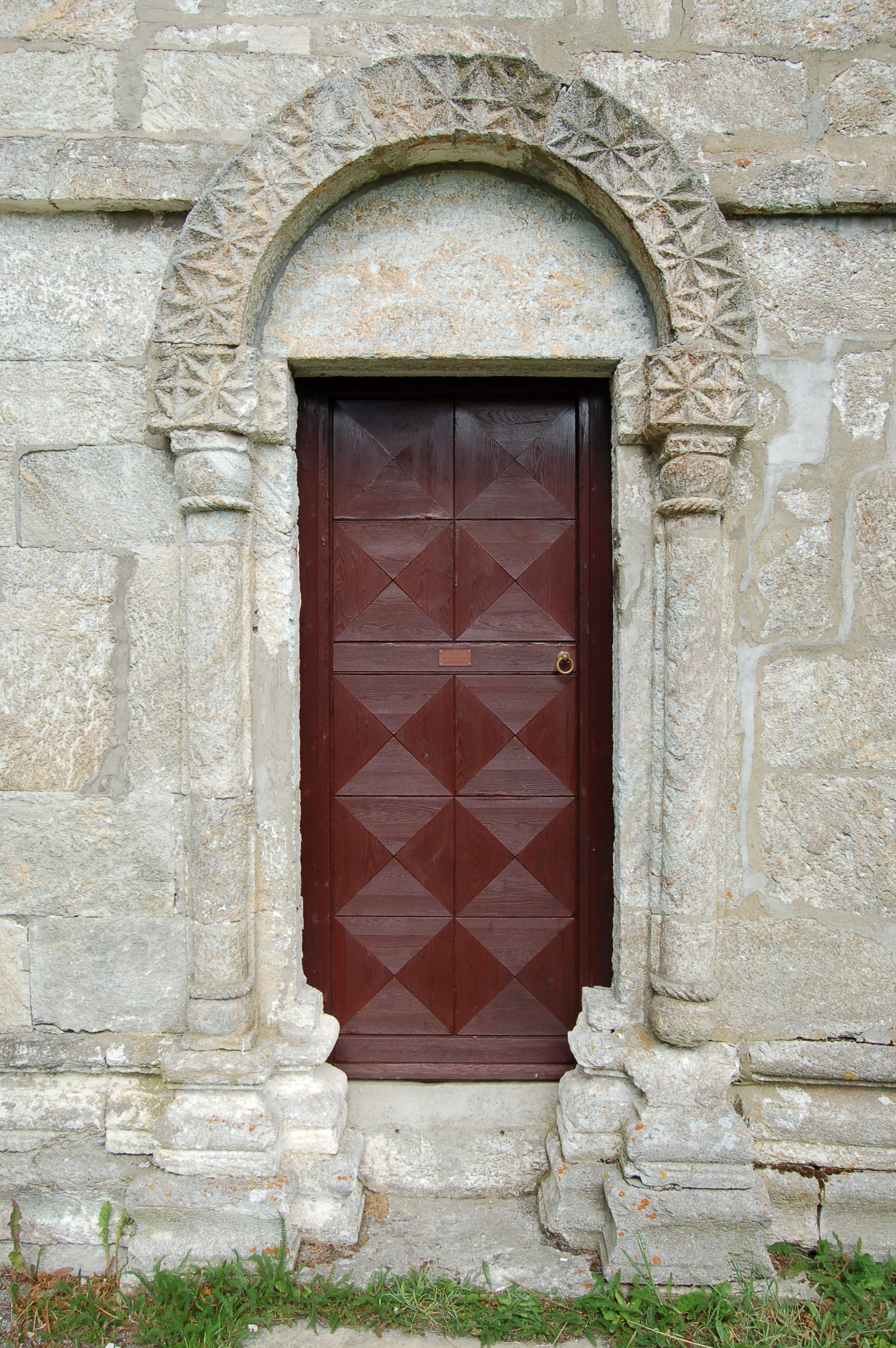
Church Portal

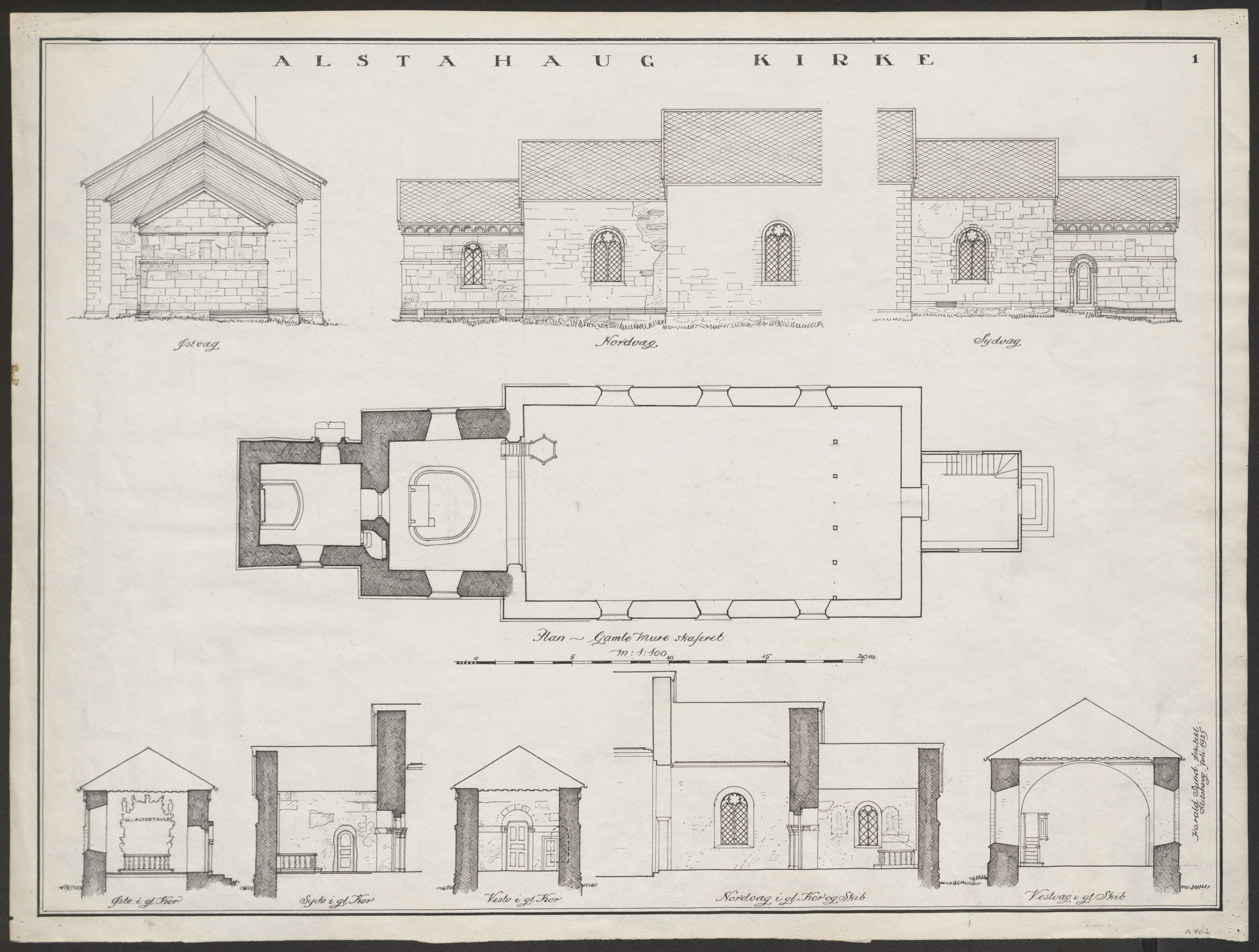
Floor plan of the church

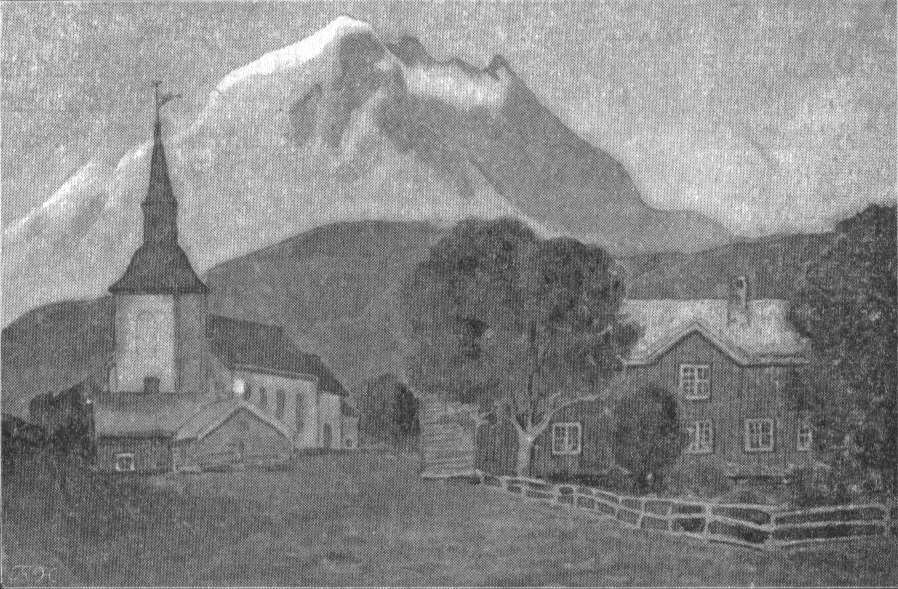
Exterior with the old west tower (c. 1900)

== See also ==
- List of churches in Sør-Hålogaland
