= Mindlandet =

Island in Nordland, Norway

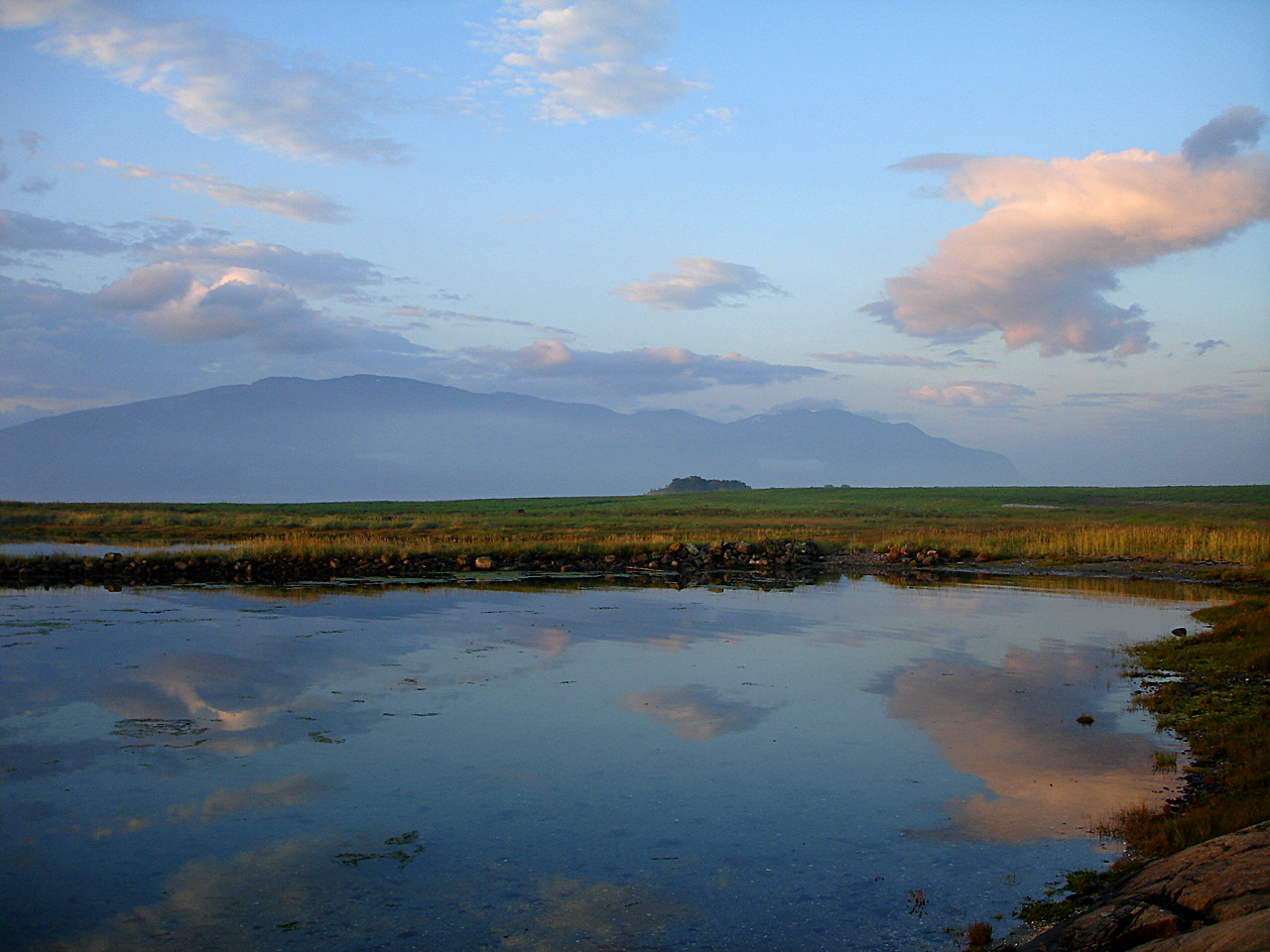
- Interactive map of Mindlandet

Geography
- Location: Nordland, Norway
- Coordinates: 65.7771°N 12.4441°E
- Area: 13.8 km^{2} (5.3 sq mi)
- Length: 9 km (5.6 mi)
- Width: 3 km (1.9 mi)
- Highest elevation: 153 m (502 ft)
- Highest point: Smafjellet

Administration
- Norway
- County: Nordland
- Municipality: Alstahaug Municipality

Demographics
- Population: 77 (2017)

Mindlandet is an island in Alstahaug Municipality in Nordland county, Norway. The 13.8-square-kilometre (5.3 sq mi) island lies at the mouth of the Vefsnfjorden, just south of the islands of Tjøtta and Rødøya. The island is fairly flat, and has a lot of very good agricultural land.

The island is only accessible by boat and there are car ferry connections to the villages of Stokka and Forvika on the mainland in Vevelstad Municipality. There are also ferry connections to the nearby islands of Rødøya (to the northeast) and Tjøtta (to the northwest). The ferry service from Vevelstad-Rødøya-Mindlandet-Tjøtta is included as part of the Norwegian County Road 17, a main highway on the Helgeland coast.

== See also ==
- List of islands of Norway
