= Halsfjorden =

Fjord in Nordland, Norway

- Interactive map of the fjord
- Location: Nordland county, Norway
- Coordinates: 65.81719°N 12.64791°E
- Type: Fjord
- Basin countries: Norway
- Max. length: 8 kilometres (5.0 mi)

Halsfjorden is a fjord arm off of the main Stokkafjorden in Vefsn Municipality in Nordland county, Norway. The fjord is 8 kilometres (5.0 mi) long to the village of Sørfjorden at the bottom of Sørfjorden.

The fjord has its entrance between Skonsengodden to the south and Merra and Halsneset to the north. The fjord runs easterly. The village of Husvik lies on the north of the fjord. From Husvik, Alsneset goes southwards of the fjord, and from there, the fjord splits in three. Halsan heads north, Grytåfjorden goes southeast, and Sørfjorden goes south. Sørfjorden is a few hundred metres longer than Halsan.
