= Altra, Nordland =

Island in Alstahaug Municipality, Norway

Altra
- Interactive map of Altra

Geography
- Location: Nordland, Norway
- Coordinates: 65.9271°N 12.3425°E

Administration
- Norway
- County: Nordland
- Municipality: Alstahaug Municipality

Altra is an island in Alstahaug Municipality in Nordland country, Norway. It forms the northern part of a continious landmass with the former islands of Blomsøya and Hestøya. The three islands were historically separated, but became connected through postglacial land uplift. The names Altra, Blomsøya and Hestøya are still used for the three respective parts of the landmass.

Austbø is a settlement at the northern end of Altra island. From the nearby Kvaløyhamn ferry quay, there are regular scheduled ferry connections to Brasøy and Flostad in Herøy Municipality and Søvik on the island of Alsta.

== See also ==
- List of islands of Norway
