= De syv søstre =

Mountain range in Nordland county, Norway

- The Seven Sisters (English)
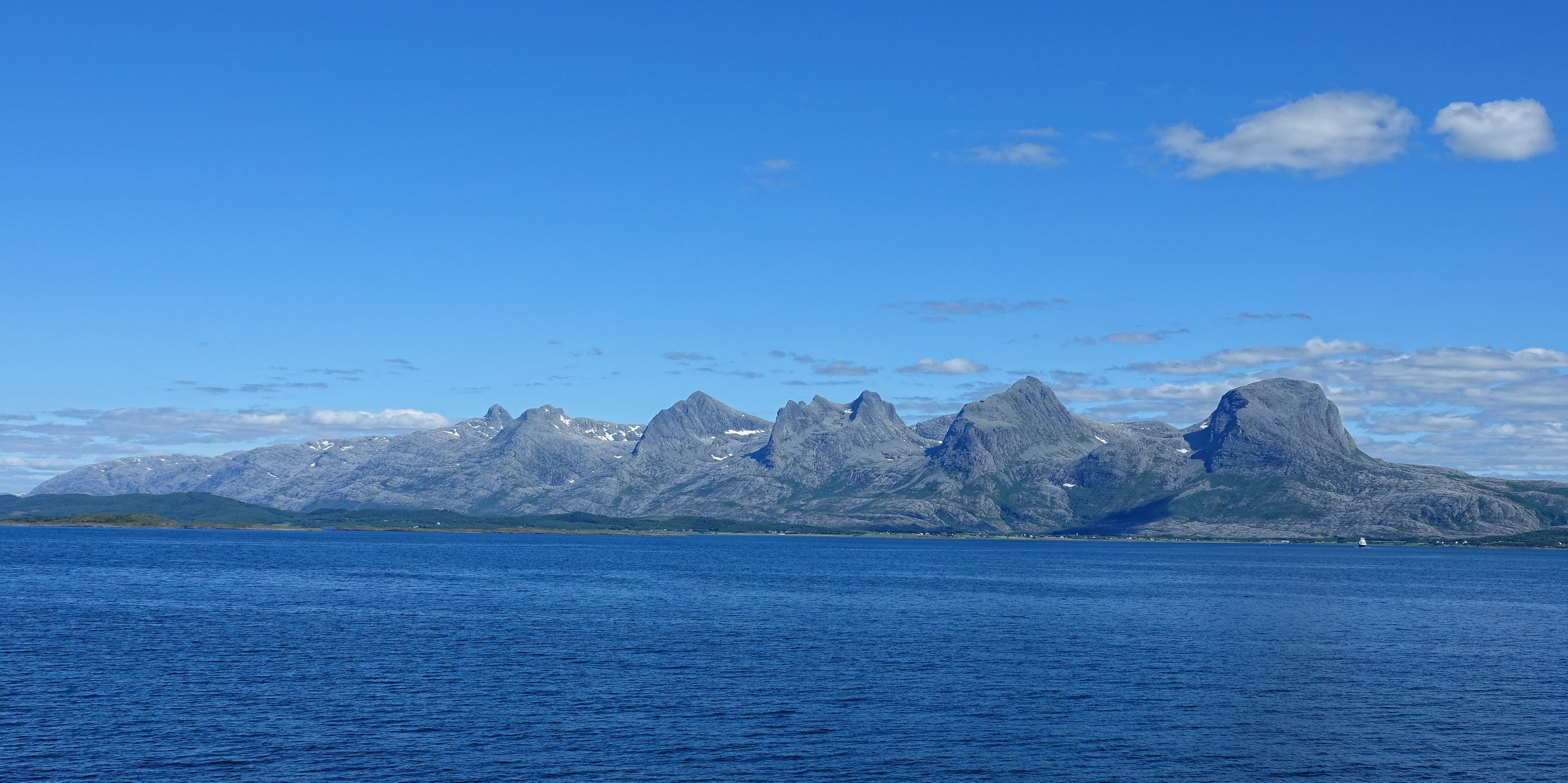
- View of the mountains (July 2018)

Highest point
- Peak: Botnkrona
- Elevation: 1,072 m (3,517 ft)
- Coordinates: 65.9617°N 12.6280°E

Dimensions
- Length: 22 km (14 mi)
- Width: 4 km (2.5 mi)

Geography
- Location within Nordland Location within Norway
- Location: Nordland, Norway
- Range coordinates: 65°56.7′N 12°33.9′E

De syv søstre (English: The Seven Sisters) is a mountain range on the island of Alsten in Alstahaug Municipality in Nordland county, Norway.

The mountain range consists of seven peaks on the southeastern half of the island. The mountains are (listed from northeast to southwest):

- Botnkrona, with a height of 1,072 metres (3,517 ft)
- Grytfoten, with a height of 1,019 metres (3,343 ft)
- Skjæringen, with a height of 1,037 metres (3,402 ft)
- Tvillingene ("the twins"), with a height of 980 metres (3,220 ft) for the taller one and 945 metres (3,100 ft) for the shorter one)
- Kvasstinden, with a height of 1,010 metres (3,310 ft)
- Breitinden, with a height of 910 metres (2,990 ft)

The range is popular with hikers and offers scenic views over the surrounding area.

All the peaks can be ascended using marked paths, and on every summit there is a notebook where visitors can write their name. After visiting all peaks, hikers can contact the local tourist association which will issue a certificate as a testimonial of their achievement. There is no time-limit for climbing all the peaks. The record for the quickest visit to all peaks is under 4 hours.

A good view of the mountain range can be achieved traveling by sea in the "Hurtigruten", as it passes the full length of the range.

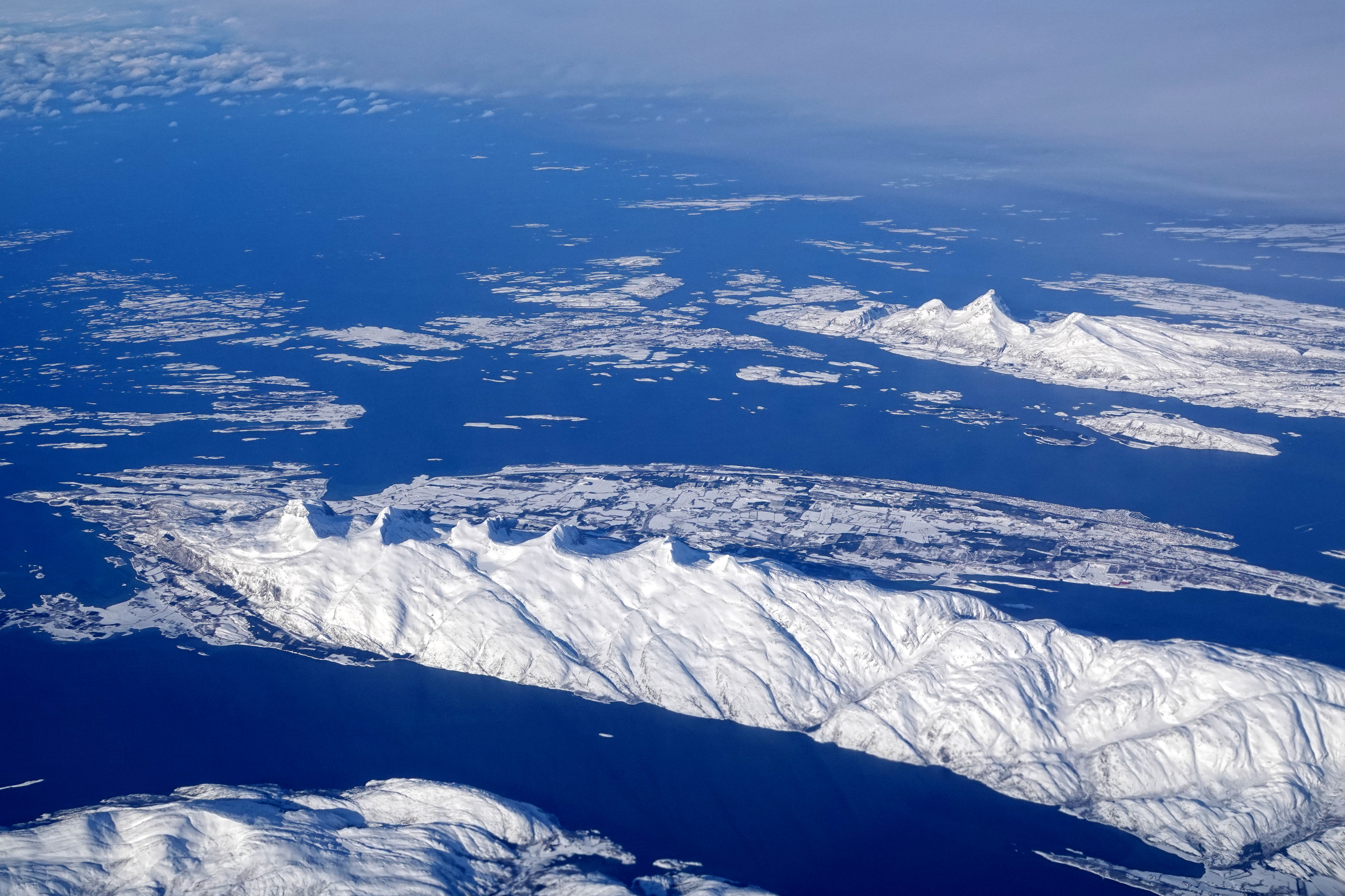
Seven Sisters in winter, seen from the east.

== See also ==
- Kjerag
- Kjeragbolten
- Preikestolen
- Trollgaren
- Trollveggen
- Trollstigen
- Trolltunga
- Besseggen
- List of waterfalls
