= Alstahaug Municipality =

Municipality in Nordland, Norway

Alstahaug Municipality Alstahaug kommune
- Municipality
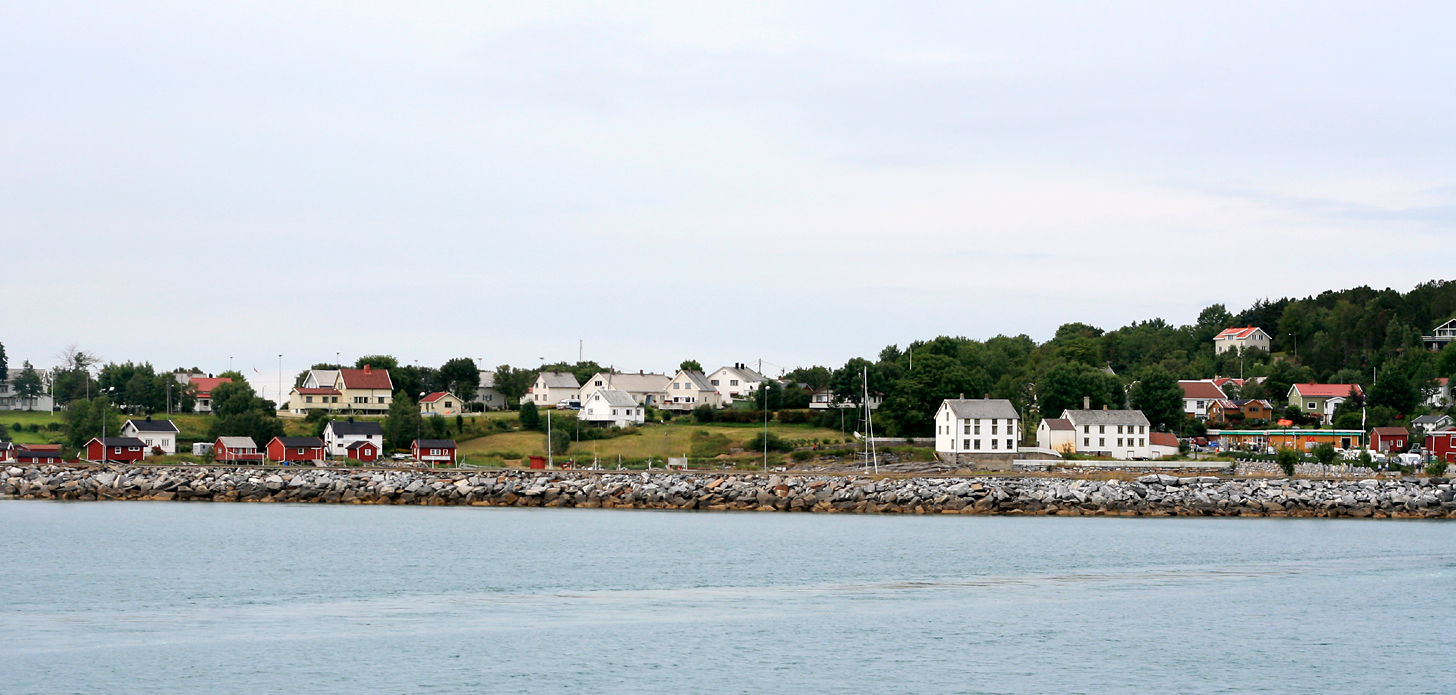
- Village of Tjøtta in Alstahaug

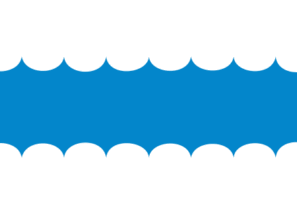
- Flag Coat of arms

- Nordland within Norway

- Alstahaug within Nordland
- Coordinates: 65°57′24″N 12°34′22″E
- Country: Norway
- County: Nordland
- District: Helgeland
- Established: 1 Jan 1838
  - Created as: Formannskapsdistrikt
- Administrative centre: Sandnessjøen

Government
  - Mayor (2019): Peder Talseth (Sp)

Area
  - Total: 188.16 km^{2} (72.65 sq mi)
  - Land: 187.20 km^{2} (72.28 sq mi)
  - Water: 0.96 km^{2} (0.37 sq mi) 0.5%
  - Rank: #308 in Norway
- Highest elevation: 1,072.01 m (3,517.1 ft)

Population (2024)
  - Total: 7,421
  - Rank: #137 in Norway
  - Density: 39.4/km^{2} (102/sq mi)
  - Change (10 years): ▲ +0.4%
- Demonym: Alstahaugværing

Official language
  - Norwegian form: Neutral
- Time zone: UTC+01:00 (CET)
  - Summer (DST): UTC+02:00 (CEST)
- ISO 3166 code: NO-1820
- Website: Official website

Alstahaug is a municipality in Nordland county, Norway. It is part of the Helgeland region. The administrative centre of the municipality is the town of Sandnessjøen. Some of the villages in Alstahaug include Søvika and Tjøtta.

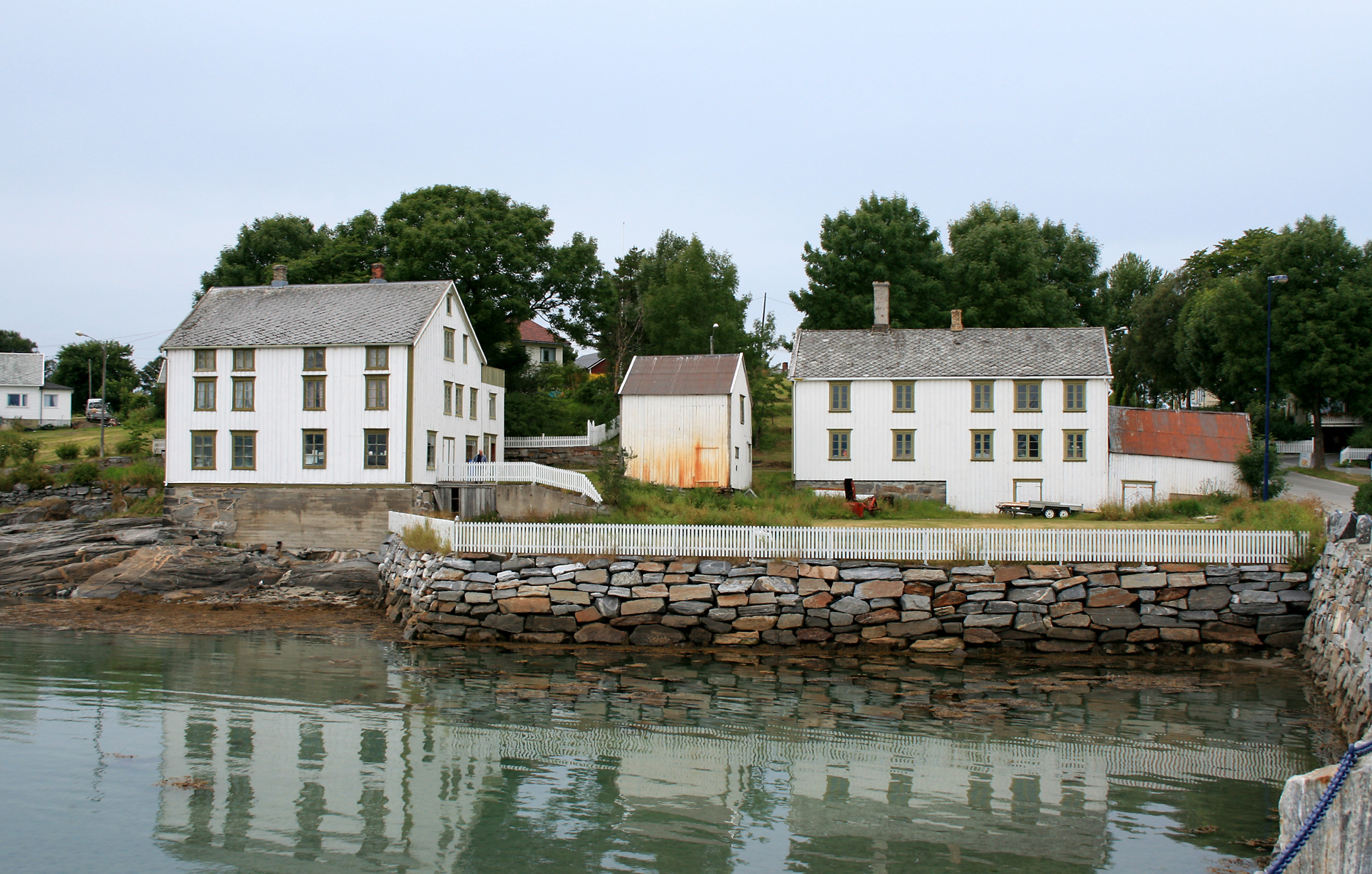
The old trading centre at Tjøtta

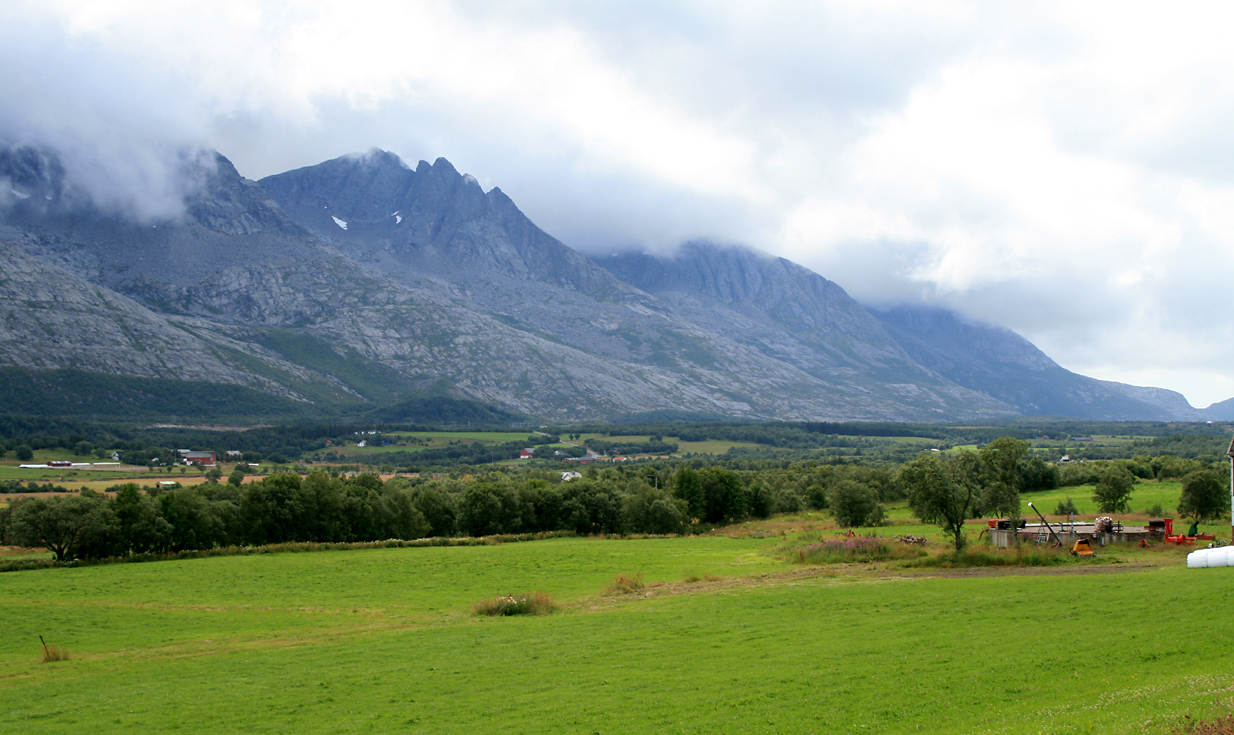
Alsten island, with lowland at the foot of the Seven Sisters mountains

Most residents of Alstahaug live in the town of Sandnessjøen which is situated on the island of Alsta. The characteristic Seven Sisters mountain range is found on the eastern part of the island. Local legend has made this chain of peaks into seven sisters, two adjacent peaks representing twin sisters.

The island is connected to the mainland via the large Helgeland Bridge along Norwegian County Road 17. The Sandnessjøen Airport, Stokka is located 10 kilometres (6.2 mi) south of Sandnessjøen.

The 188-square-kilometre (73 sq mi) municipality is the 308th largest by area out of the 357 municipalities in Norway. Alstahaug Municipality is the 137th most populous municipality in Norway with a population of 7,421. The municipality's population density is 39.4 inhabitants per square kilometre (102/sq mi) and its population has increased by 0.4% over the previous 10-year period.

== General information ==
The large prestegjeld of Alstahaug was established as a municipality on 1 January 1838 (see formannskapsdistrikt law). In 1862, the southern district (population: 2,781) was separated to become the new Tjøtta Municipality (Vevelstad Municipality was later separated from Tjøtta Municipality). This left Alstahaug Municipality with about 3,280 residents. Just two years later, in 1864, the western island district (population: 2,438) was separated to become the new Herøy Municipality. Then on 1 July 1899, the northern district (population: 2,673) was separated to form the new Stamnes Municipality (Leirfjord Municipality was later separated from Stamnes).

During the 1960s, there were many municipal mergers across Norway due to the work of the Schei Committee. On 1 January 1965, several major municipal changes took place. First, the Husvær island area of Alstahaug (population: 461) was transferred from Alstahaug Municipality to Herøy Municipality. On the same day, the following areas were merged to form the new, larger Alstahaug Municipality:

- most of Tjøtta Municipality, except the Skogsholmen area (population: 1,477)
- all of Sandnessjøen Municipality (population: 3,856)
- all of Alstahaug Municipality (population: 970)

On 1 January 1971, the Skålværet islands (population: 32) were transferred from Vega Municipality to Alstahaug Municipality. On 1 January 1995, the mainland areas of Alstahaug Municipality (population: 70) were transferred to Vefsn Municipality.

=== Name ===
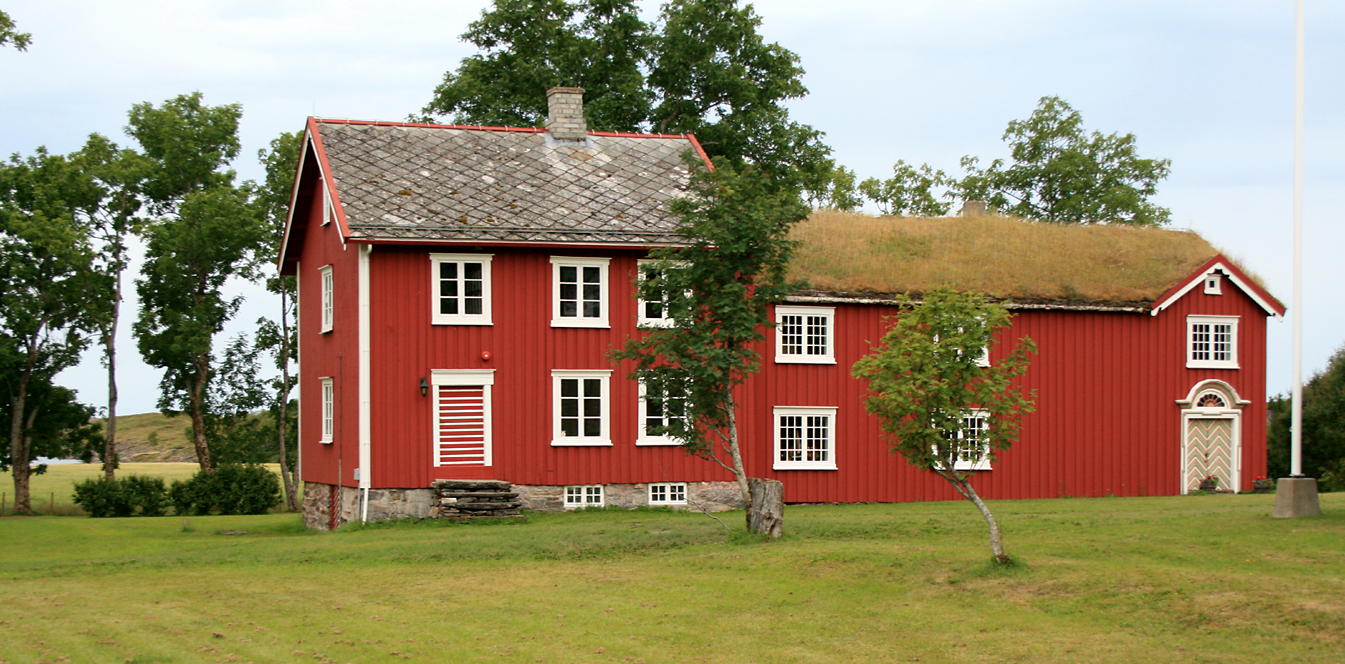
The old parsonage at Alstahaug.

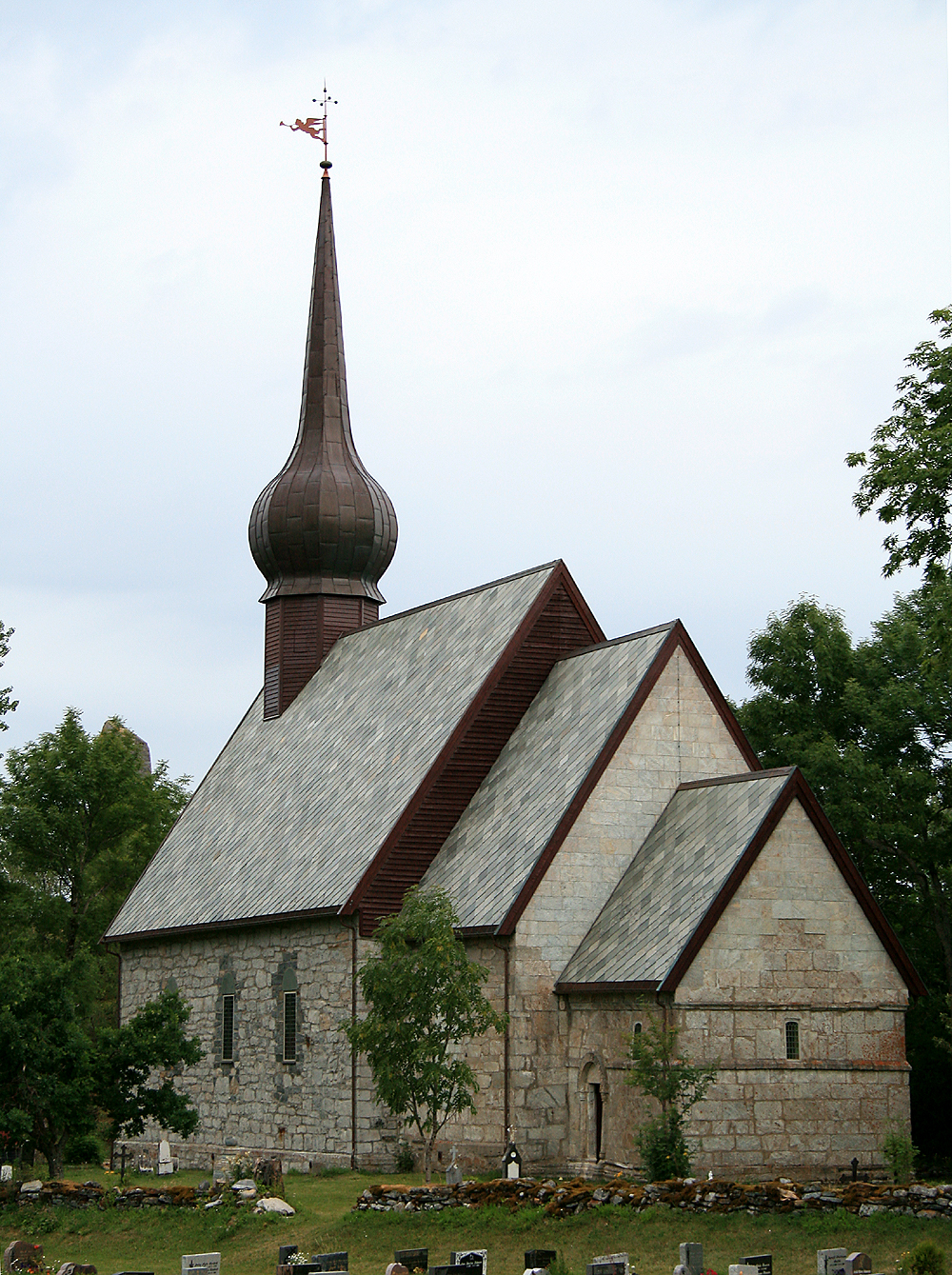
Alstahaug Church

The municipality (originally the parish) is named after the old Alstahaug farm (Old Norse: Alastarhaugr) since the first Alstahaug Church was built there. The first element is the genitive case of the name of the island Alöst (now Alsta). The linguist Magnus Olsen believed this old island name means "eel grounds" and it was an old taboo word for the sea. The last element is haugr which means "hill" or "mound".

=== Coat of arms ===
The coat of arms was granted on 8 August 1986. The official blazon is "Argent, a fess engrailed azure" (Norwegian: I sølv en blå bjelke dannet ved taggesnitt). This means the arms have a field (background) that has a tincture of argent which means it is commonly colored white, but if it is made out of metal, then silver is used. The charge is a fess (bar) with engrailed edges running horizontally through the arms. The design symbolizes the Seven Sisters (Norwegian: De syv søstre), a row of mountains in the area, mirrored in the clear waters of the fjord. The arms were designed by Jarle E. Henriksen.

=== Churches ===
The Church of Norway has three parishes (sokn) within Alstahaug Municipality. It is part of the Nord-Helgeland prosti (deanery) in the Diocese of Sør-Hålogaland.

Churches in Alstahaug Municipality
Parish (sokn)	Church name	Location of the church	Year built
Alstahaug	Alstahaug Church	Alstahaug	12th century
Sandnessjøen	Sandnessjøen Church	Sandnessjøen	1882
Tjøtta	Skålvær Church	Skålværet	1851
Tjøtta	Tjøtta Church	Tjøtta	1867

== History ==
At Alstahaug, on the southern end of the island of Alsta, lies the medieval Alstahaug Church, where the poet and minister Petter Dass worked around 1700. Tjøtta, an island south of Alsta, is the place where the famous Viking Hárek of Tjøtta resided in the 11th century.

== Nature ==
=== Birdlife ===
Alstahaug lies just south of the Arctic Circle in the area known as Outer Helgeland. The municipality has both coastal and inland habitats, with the Seven Sisters mountain chain marking the boundary between them, and is a destination for bird watchers. The island of Tjøtta is home to the small nature reserve Ostjønna.

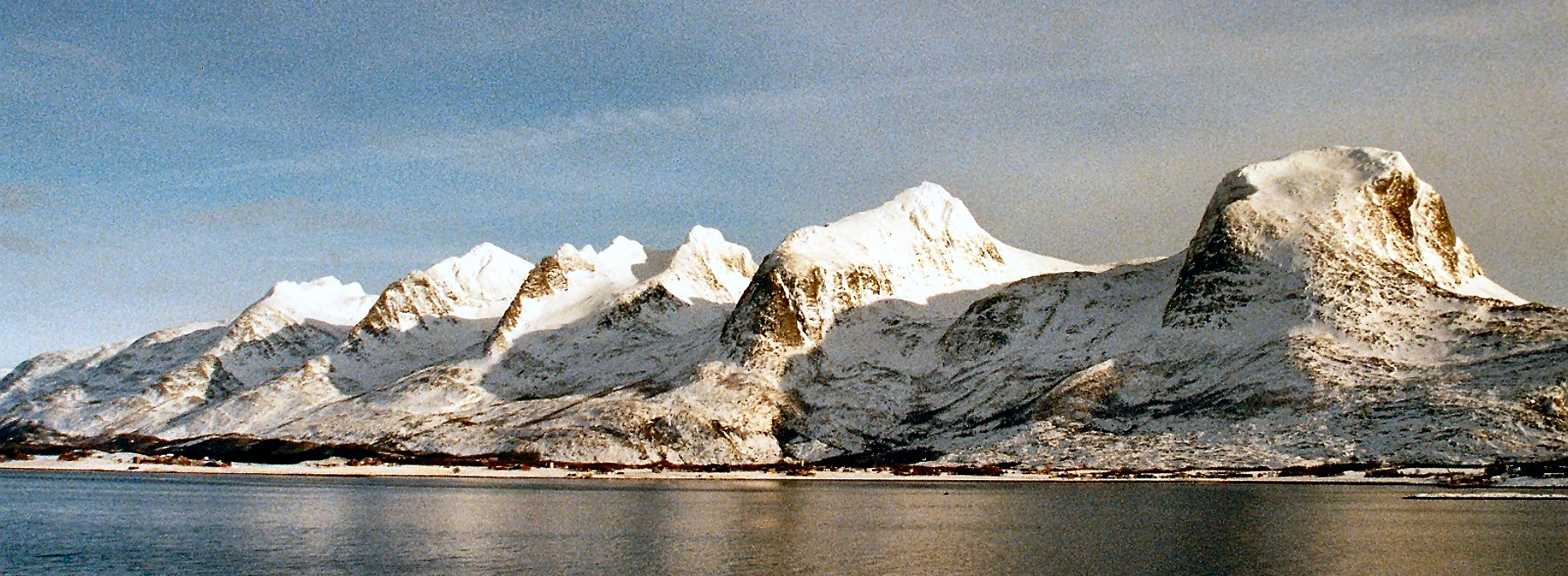
The Seven Sisters Mountains in Alstahaug

== Geography ==
Alstahaug Municipality consists entirely of islands. Most residents live on the main islands of Alsta and Tjøtta. Alstahaug Municipality stretches from the Skålværet island group in the west, to the Vefsnfjorden in the east, and to Mindlandet island to the south. Leirfjord Municipality, Vefsn Municipality, and Vevelstad Municipality all lie to the east of Alstahaug; Dønna Municipality lies to the north; Herøy Municipality lies to the west; and Vega Municipality lies to the south. The highest point in the municipality is the 1,072-metre (3,517 ft) tall mountain Botnkrona, one of the De syv søstre mountains on the island of Alsta.

=== Climate ===
The official weather station is located at Sandnessjøen Airport, Stokka, on Alsta island. Alstahaug has a temperate oceanic climate (marine west coast climate). The record high was recorded July 2019, and the all-time low was recorded February 2010. The warmest high recorded in the municipality is 33.1 °C (92 °F) recorded July 2019 at Tjøtta island. The November record high 19.4 °C (67 °F) set 6 November 2003 is warmest November temperature recorded in Nordland.

Climate data for Sandnessjøen Airport 1991-2020 (17 m, precipitation Tjøtta, extremes 2003-2026)
Month	Jan	Feb	Mar	Apr	May	Jun	Jul	Aug	Sep	Oct	Nov	Dec	Year
Record high °C (°F)	11.6 (52.9)	13.4 (56.1)	13.1 (55.6)	20.1 (68.2)	27.6 (81.7)	30.5 (86.9)	31.8 (89.2)	28.9 (84.0)	24.8 (76.6)	21.8 (71.2)	19.4 (66.9)	13.1 (55.6)	31.8 (89.2)
Mean daily maximum °C (°F)	2 (36)	2 (36)	4 (39)	8 (46)	11 (52)	14 (57)	18 (64)	17 (63)	14 (57)	9 (48)	5 (41)	4 (39)	9 (48)
Daily mean °C (°F)	1.1 (34.0)	0.3 (32.5)	1.4 (34.5)	4.5 (40.1)	8 (46)	11.3 (52.3)	14.5 (58.1)	13.9 (57.0)	11 (52)	6.5 (43.7)	3.9 (39.0)	1.9 (35.4)	6.5 (43.7)
Mean daily minimum °C (°F)	−1 (30)	−1 (30)	−1 (30)	2 (36)	5 (41)	9 (48)	12 (54)	11 (52)	9 (48)	5 (41)	2 (36)	1 (34)	4 (40)
Record low °C (°F)	−15.5 (4.1)	−15.6 (3.9)	−12.4 (9.7)	−5.7 (21.7)	−1.6 (29.1)	0.9 (33.6)	4.7 (40.5)	3.2 (37.8)	0.7 (33.3)	−4.1 (24.6)	−10.1 (13.8)	−11.2 (11.8)	−15.6 (3.9)
Average precipitation mm (inches)	128 (5.0)	105 (4.1)	107 (4.2)	89 (3.5)	69 (2.7)	73 (2.9)	71 (2.8)	93 (3.7)	150 (5.9)	137 (5.4)	117 (4.6)	149 (5.9)	1,288 (50.7)
Source 1: Norwegian Meteorological Institute
Source 2: Weatheronline climate robot

== Government ==
Alstahaug Municipality is responsible for primary education (through 10th grade), outpatient health services, senior citizen services, welfare and other social services, zoning, economic development, and municipal roads and utilities. The municipality is governed by a municipal council of directly elected representatives. The mayor is indirectly elected by a vote of the municipal council. The municipality is under the jurisdiction of the Helgeland District Court and the Hålogaland Court of Appeal.

=== Municipal council ===
The municipal council (Kommunestyre) of Alstahaug Municipality is made up of 27 representatives that are elected to four year terms. The tables below show the current and historical composition of the council by political party.

Alstahaug kommunestyre 2023–2027
Party name (in Norwegian)	Number of representatives
Labour Party (Arbeiderpartiet)	5
Progress Party (Fremskrittspartiet)	3
Conservative Party (Høyre)	4
Red Party (Rødt)	2
Centre Party (Senterpartiet)	9
Socialist Left Party (Sosialistisk Venstreparti)	2
Liberal Party (Venstre)	2
Total number of members:	27

Alstahaug kommunestyre 2019–2023
Party name (in Norwegian)	Number of representatives
Labour Party (Arbeiderpartiet)	3
Progress Party (Fremskrittspartiet)	1
Conservative Party (Høyre)	2
Red Party (Rødt)	5
Centre Party (Senterpartiet)	12
Socialist Left Party (Sosialistisk Venstreparti)	1
Liberal Party (Venstre)	1
City and rural – cross-party list (By og land – tverrpolitisk liste)	2
Total number of members:	27

Alstahaug kommunestyre 2015–2019
Party name (in Norwegian)	Number of representatives
Labour Party (Arbeiderpartiet)	11
Progress Party (Fremskrittspartiet)	2
Conservative Party (Høyre)	4
Red Party (Rødt)	2
Centre Party (Senterpartiet)	5
Socialist Left Party (Sosialistisk Venstreparti)	1
Liberal Party (Venstre)	2
Total number of members:	27

Alstahaug kommunestyre 2011–2015
Party name (in Norwegian)	Number of representatives
Labour Party (Arbeiderpartiet)	9
Progress Party (Fremskrittspartiet)	4
Conservative Party (Høyre)	6
Red Party (Rødt)	2
Centre Party (Senterpartiet)	3
Liberal Party (Venstre)	3
Total number of members:	27

Alstahaug kommunestyre 2007–2011
Party name (in Norwegian)	Number of representatives
Labour Party (Arbeiderpartiet)	6
Progress Party (Fremskrittspartiet)	5
Conservative Party (Høyre)	7
Coastal Party (Kystpartiet)	1
Red Electoral Alliance (Rød Valgallianse)	2
Centre Party (Senterpartiet)	5
Socialist Left Party (Sosialistisk Venstreparti)	1
Liberal Party (Venstre)	1
Sandnessjøen cross-party list—Town list (Sandnessjøen tverrpolitiske liste—Bylista)	3
Total number of members:	31

Alstahaug kommunestyre 2003–2007
Party name (in Norwegian)	Number of representatives
Labour Party (Arbeiderpartiet)	10
Progress Party (Fremskrittspartiet)	6
Conservative Party (Høyre)	5
Christian Democratic Party (Kristelig Folkeparti)	1
Red Electoral Alliance (Rød Valgallianse)	2
Centre Party (Senterpartiet)	4
Socialist Left Party (Sosialistisk Venstreparti)	2
Liberal Party (Venstre)	1
Total number of members:	31

Alstahaug kommunestyre 1999–2003
Party name (in Norwegian)	Number of representatives
Labour Party (Arbeiderpartiet)	9
Progress Party (Fremskrittspartiet)	5
Conservative Party (Høyre)	6
Christian Democratic Party (Kristelig Folkeparti)	1
Coastal Party (Kystpartiet)	1
Centre Party (Senterpartiet)	4
Liberal Party (Venstre)	1
Joint list of the Red Electoral Alliance (Rød Valgallianse) and the Socialist Left Party (Sosialistisk Venstreparti)	4
Total number of members:	31

Alstahaug kommunestyre 1995–1999
Party name (in Norwegian)	Number of representatives
Labour Party (Arbeiderpartiet)	13
Progress Party (Fremskrittspartiet)	3
Conservative Party (Høyre)	5
Christian Democratic Party (Kristelig Folkeparti)	1
Red Electoral Alliance (Rød Valgallianse)	2
Centre Party (Senterpartiet)	5
Socialist Left Party (Sosialistisk Venstreparti)	1
Liberal Party (Venstre)	1
Total number of members:	31

Alstahaug kommunestyre 1991–1995
Party name (in Norwegian)	Number of representatives
Labour Party (Arbeiderpartiet)	12
Progress Party (Fremskrittspartiet)	2
Conservative Party (Høyre)	6
Christian Democratic Party (Kristelig Folkeparti)	1
Red Electoral Alliance (Rød Valgallianse)	1
Centre Party (Senterpartiet)	4
Socialist Left Party (Sosialistisk Venstreparti)	4
Liberal Party (Venstre)	1
Total number of members:	31

Alstahaug kommunestyre 1987–1991
Party name (in Norwegian)	Number of representatives
Labour Party (Arbeiderpartiet)	15
Progress Party (Fremskrittspartiet)	1
Conservative Party (Høyre)	9
Christian Democratic Party (Kristelig Folkeparti)	1
Red Electoral Alliance (Rød Valgallianse)	1
Centre Party (Senterpartiet)	2
Socialist Left Party (Sosialistisk Venstreparti)	1
Liberal Party (Venstre)	1
Total number of members:	31

Alstahaug kommunestyre 1983–1987
Party name (in Norwegian)	Number of representatives
Labour Party (Arbeiderpartiet)	14
Conservative Party (Høyre)	8
Christian Democratic Party (Kristelig Folkeparti)	2
Red Electoral Alliance (Rød Valgallianse)	1
Centre Party (Senterpartiet)	3
Socialist Left Party (Sosialistisk Venstreparti)	1
Liberal Party (Venstre)	2
Total number of members:	31

Alstahaug kommunestyre 1979–1983
Party name (in Norwegian)	Number of representatives
Labour Party (Arbeiderpartiet)	11
Conservative Party (Høyre)	9
Christian Democratic Party (Kristelig Folkeparti)	2
Red Electoral Alliance (Rød Valgallianse)	1
Centre Party (Senterpartiet)	4
Socialist Left Party (Sosialistisk Venstreparti)	1
Liberal Party (Venstre)	2
Alstahaug Free Voters (Alstahaug Frie Velgere)	1
Total number of members:	31

Alstahaug kommunestyre 1975–1979
Party name (in Norwegian)	Number of representatives
Labour Party (Arbeiderpartiet)	11
Conservative Party (Høyre)	7
Christian Democratic Party (Kristelig Folkeparti)	4
Centre Party (Senterpartiet)	5
Socialist Left Party (Sosialistisk Venstreparti)	2
Liberal Party (Venstre)	2
Total number of members:	31

Alstahaug kommunestyre 1971–1975
Party name (in Norwegian)	Number of representatives
Labour Party (Arbeiderpartiet)	15
Conservative Party (Høyre)	3
Christian Democratic Party (Kristelig Folkeparti)	3
Centre Party (Senterpartiet)	7
Socialist People's Party (Sosialistisk Folkeparti)	1
Liberal Party (Venstre)	2
Total number of members:	31

Alstahaug kommunestyre 1967–1971
Party name (in Norwegian)	Number of representatives
Labour Party (Arbeiderpartiet)	16
Conservative Party (Høyre)	4
Christian Democratic Party (Kristelig Folkeparti)	3
Centre Party (Senterpartiet)	4
Socialist People's Party (Sosialistisk Folkeparti)	1
Liberal Party (Venstre)	3
Total number of members:	31

Alstahaug kommunestyre 1963–1967
Party name (in Norwegian)	Number of representatives
Local List(s) (Lokale lister)	13
Total number of members:	13
Note: On 1 January 1965, Tjøtta Municipality and Sandnessjøen Municipality became part of Alstahaug Municipality.

Alstahaug herredsstyre 1959–1963
Party name (in Norwegian)	Number of representatives
Local List(s) (Lokale lister)	13
Total number of members:	13

Alstahaug herredsstyre 1955–1959
Party name (in Norwegian)	Number of representatives
Local List(s) (Lokale lister)	13
Total number of members:	13

Alstahaug herredsstyre 1951–1955
Party name (in Norwegian)	Number of representatives
Local List(s) (Lokale lister)	12
Total number of members:	12

Alstahaug herredsstyre 1947–1951
Party name (in Norwegian)	Number of representatives
Local List(s) (Lokale lister)	12
Total number of members:	12

Alstahaug herredsstyre 1945–1947
Party name (in Norwegian)	Number of representatives
Labour Party (Arbeiderpartiet)	1
Local List(s) (Lokale lister)	11
Total number of members:	12

Alstahaug herredsstyre 1937–1941*
Party name (in Norwegian)	Number of representatives
Labour Party (Arbeiderpartiet)	1
Local List(s) (Lokale lister)	11
Total number of members:	12
Note: Due to the German occupation of Norway during World War II, no elections were held for new municipal councils until after the war ended in 1945.

=== Mayors ===
The mayor (Norwegian: ordfører) of Alstahaug Municipality is the political leader of the municipality and the chairperson of the municipal council. Here is a list of people who have held this position:

- 1838–1845: Fredrik Holst
- 1846–1851: Johan Brodtkorb
- 1852–1856: Adolf Wikborg
- 1857–1862: O. Amble
- 1857–1870: Arnt Olsen Steiro
- 1871–1882: Lars Haugen
- 1883–1884: Peder H.W. Johansen
- 1885–1888: Mr. Bergh
- 1888–1896: Edvard Jensen
- 1897–1899: M. Fisknes
- 1899–1901: Vigand Tuxen-Holst
- 1902–1907: K.K. Gjelle
- 1908–1912: Sølfest Lassesen Dalaker
- 1912–1919: Jens J. Steiro (Bp)
- 1919–1920: Martin Aakerøy
- 1920–1925: Eldor Ebbesen Brasøy
- 1925–1939: Jens J. Steiro (Bp)
- 1939–1941: Alfred Storheil
- 1941–1942: Anders Stokka
- 1943–1944: Ole Jensen
- 1945–1945: Alfred Storheil
- 1946–1947: Johannes Almlid
- 1947–1955: Jarle Storheil (Sp)
- 1955–1959: Ingvart Johansen
- 1959–1968: Jarle Storheil (Sp)
- 1968–1974: Torvald Kibsgaard (Ap)
- 1975–1983: Andreas Grimsø (H)
- 1984–1993: Gunnar Breimo (Ap)
- 1993–1999: Bill Rønning (Ap)
- 1999–2003: Bjarne Myhre (H)
- 2003–2004: Håkon Mørk (Sp)
- 2004–2007: Magne Greger (Ap)
- 2007–2011: Stig Sørra (H)
- 2011–2019: Bård Anders Langø (Ap)
- 2019–present: Peder Talseth (Sp)

== Notable people ==
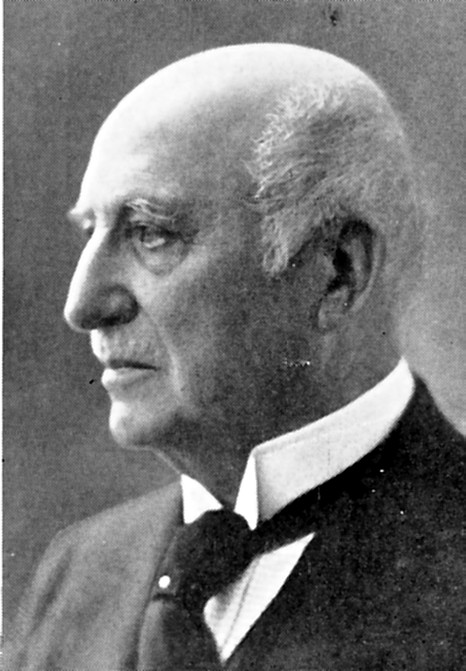
Torolf Prytz, 1934

- Peder Krabbe Gaarder (1814 in Alstahaug – 1883), a jurist and political theorist
- Adam Arndtsen (1829 in Alstahaug – 1919), a professor and physicist
- Torolf Prytz (1858 in Alstahaug – 1938), an architect, goldsmith, and politician
- Einar Hole Moxnes (1921 in Alstahaug – 2006), a politician and Mayor of Åfjord Municipality from 1955 to 1966
- Tone Thiis Schjetne (1928–2015), a sculptor who lived in Sandnessjøen
- Gunnar Breimo (born 1939 in Alstahaug), a politician and Mayor of Alstahaug from 1983 to 1993
- Odd Eriksen (1955–2023), a member of the Cabinet of Norway, recipient of the Polaris Award, and one of two who stopped a plane hijacking in 2004
- Arve Moen Bergset (born 1972 in Sandnessjøen), a traditional folk singer, hardanger fiddler, and classical violinist
- Stian Theting (born 1976 in Sandnessjøen), a footballer with over 500 club caps
- Rebekka Karijord (born 1976 in Sandnessjøen), a Stockholm-based musician and composer
- Sander Rølvåg (born 1990 in Sandnessjøen), a Norwegian curler
