= Leirfjord =

Leirfjord or Leirfjorden may refer to:

== Places ==
- Leirfjord Municipality, a municipality in Nordland county, Norway
- Leirfjorden, a fjord in Alstahaug Municipality and Leirfjord Municipality in Nordland county, Norway
- Leirfjord Church, a church in Leirfjord Municipality in Nordland county, Norway
- Leirfjorden (Sørfold), a fjord in Sørfold Municipality in Nordland county, Norway
- Leirfjordgård, a village in Sørfold Municipality in Nordland county, Norway

== Other ==
- Leirfjord IL, a sports club based in Leirfjord Municipality in Nordland county, Norway
