= Bergheim =

Bergheim may refer to:

== People ==
- Kristian Bergheim (1926–2010), Norwegian musician
- Stanislaus Bergheim (born 1984), German footballer
- Ragnhild Bergheim (born 1962), Norwegian politician for the Labour Party
- Rüdiger of Bergheim, Bishop of Chiemsee from 1216 to 1233

== Places ==
- Bergheim, Austria, a municipality in Salzburg-Umgebung district in Austria
- Bergheim, Bavaria, a municipality in Bavaria, Germany
- Bergheim, Haut-Rhin, a commune in the Haut-Rhin département in France
- Bergheim, North Rhine-Westphalia, capital of Rhein-Erft-Kreis district in North Rhine-Westphalia, Germany
- Heidelberg-Bergheim, a district of Heidelberg in Germany
- Bergheim, a name for Bærum in Norway
- Bergheim, Texas, an unincorporated community
- Bergheim, a parish of Edertal, a municipality in Hesse, Germany
