= Lørenskog Upper Secondary School =

- Lørenskog videregående skole

Location
- Sykehusveien 11, 1474 Nordbyhagen; Lørenskog; Norway
- Coordinates: 59°55′56″N 10°59′04″E

Information
- School type: Public secondary school
- Motto: Education with quality
- Founded: 1972
- Principal: Odin Tellesbø
- Staff: 80
- Grades: 11–13
- Age range: 16–19
- Enrollment: 800
- Classes offered: General education
- Language: Norwegian; English
- Campus: Suburban
- Website: http://www.lorenskog.vgs.no/

Lørenskog Upper Secondary School (Norwegian: Lørenskog videregående skole) is an upper secondary school in Lørenskog in Akershus county, Norway. Established in 1972, it is one of two upper secondary schools in Lørenskog municipality along with Mailand Upper Secondary School.

== History ==
The school was established in 1972 as Lørenskog Gymnasium. Its initial buildings, which was located on a farm in Fjellhamar was previously used as a town hall. However, due to the recent construction of a new town hall at Kjenn, the farm became available for the new school to use. Two years after opening, it was renamed Lørenskog School Center, the school was understaffed and the classrooms were tiny, the science classes had to be done at the nearby Fjellhamar elementary school, and the school had only one full-time employee which was the principal. By this time the number of students had exceeded 500.

In 1976 new education laws were adopted which created the so-called "combined schools", which meant that all of the different forms of secondary education would be combined into a new "Upper Secondary School (Norwegian: Videregående skole). This new model included four different programmes for students; General education, Household, Crafts-and Industry and Commercial education. By the year 1980 the number of students had reached 750.

The number of applicants for the General Education programme was initially so great that the school had to reject a great number of students from Lørenskog. This meant that a large number of the youth in Lørenskog had to travel to Oslo for their secondary education. The school introduced in 1996 a two-year programme for adult-education, designed for adults to complete their high-school diploma, or take new courses.

== Education ==
The school currently offers the following programmes at 1st 2nd and 3rd year level: General Studies, Sports studies, Restaurant and food processing studies, Design-and crafts studies, and a department of special education. In addition the school offers a two-year programme for adult education.

== Notable alumni ==
- Johann Olav Koss, Speed skater
- Noman Mubashir, journalist
- M2M, Former Pop Duo
  - Marit Larsen, Pop Artist
  - Marion Raven, Pop-Rock Artist
- John Carew, footballer
- Kristoffer Tokstad, footballer
- Marianne Aulie, model and artist
- Tom Nordlie, football manager
