= Skårer =

- Village
- Location in Akershus
- Coordinates: 59°55′17″N 10°57′37″E
- Country: Norway
- Region: Østlandet
- County: Akershus
- Municipality: Lørenskog
- Time zone: UTC+01:00 (CET)
  - Summer (DST): UTC+02:00 (CEST)

Skårer is a village in Lørenskog, Akershus, Norway.

Skårer is part of a continuous urban area between Oslo and Lillestrøm, located on the south side of the national road 159 (Strømsveien).

The town has some industry and several shopping centers. One of them is Triaden Senter, which has a hotel, a cinema, a theater hall, and a library. The Lørenskog local history museum is also located at Skårer farm.

The name comes from the Old Norse word Skorar, from skor, which may mean “rock shelf” or “ledge.”
