= Ragnhild Bergheim =

Norwegian politician

Member of the Storting
- Incumbent
- Assumed office 1 October 2025
- Constituency: Akershus

Mayor of Lørenskog
- In office 21 October 2015 – 18 October 2023
- Deputy: Ernst-Modest Herdieckerhoff (MDG)
- Preceded by: Åge Tovan (Ap)
- Succeeded by: Amine Mabel Andresen (H)

Deputy Mayor of Lørenskog
- In office 17 October 2007 – 21 October 2015
- Mayor: Åge Tovan (Ap)
- Preceded by: Martin Bjerke (SV)
- Succeeded by: Ernst-Modest Herdieckerhoff (MDG)

Personal details
- Born: 22 November 1962 (age 63)
- Party: Labour

Ragnhild Synnøve Bergheim (born 22 November 1962) is a Norwegian politician from the Labour Party (Ap). She was mayor of Lørenskog municipality from 2015 to 2023.

== Career ==
Bergheim became mayor of Lørenskog municipality after the 2015 Norwegian local elections and was re-elected in 2019. Prior to this, she had been deputy mayor since 2007. She was elected to the Storting in the 2025 Norwegian parliamentary election.

She previously worked as a nurse at the company AstraZeneca.
