= Leland, Norway =

Village in Leirfjord Municipality, Norway

Leland
- Village
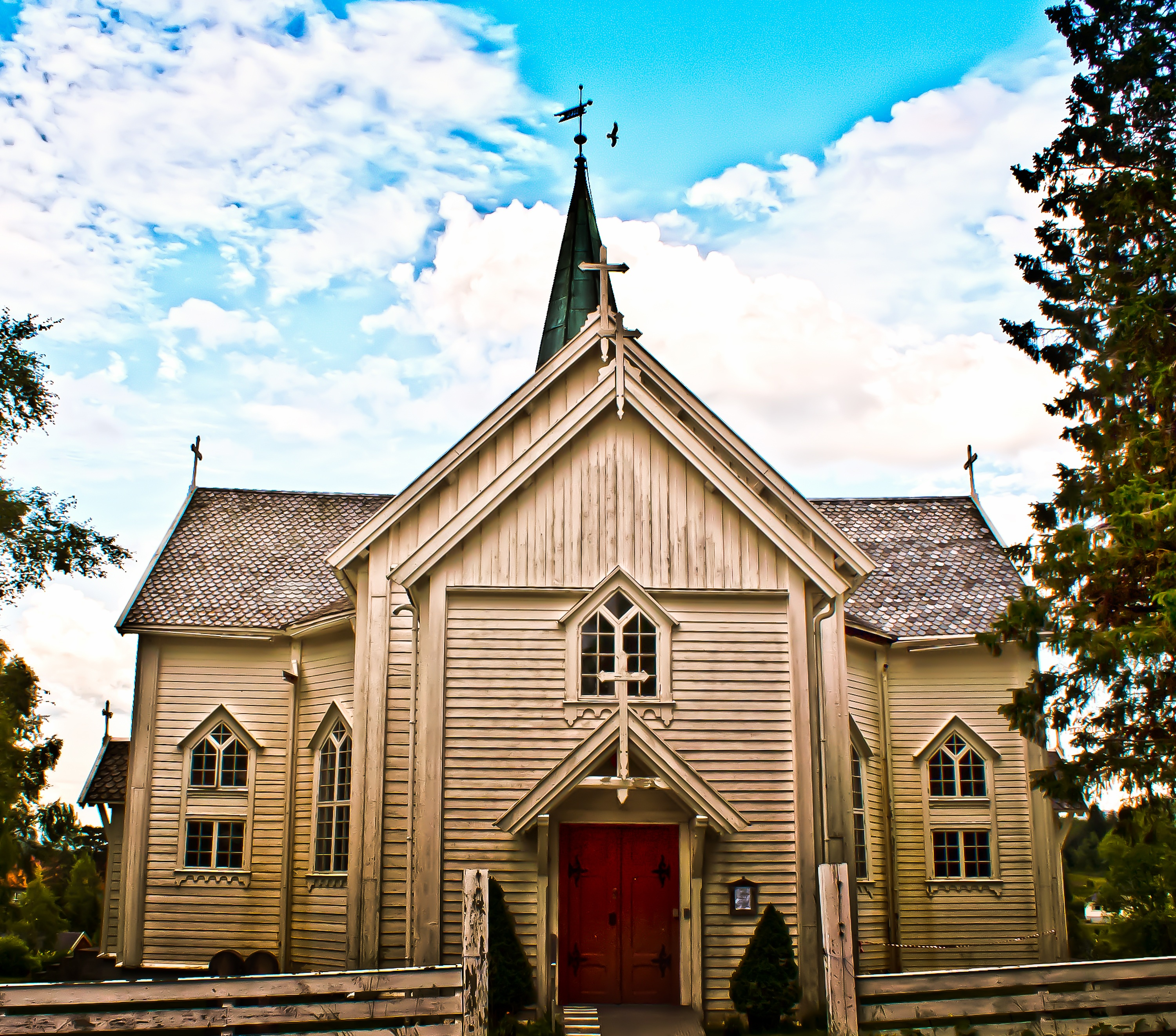
- View of the village
- Interactive map of Leland
- Location within Nordland Location within Norway
- Coordinates: 66.0641°N 12.9433°E
- Country: Norway
- Region: Northern Norway
- County: Nordland
- District: Helgeland
- Municipality: Leirfjord Municipality

Area
  - Total: 0.76 km^{2} (0.29 sq mi)
- Elevation: 22 m (72 ft)

Population (2024)
  - Total: 774
  - Density: 1,018/km^{2} (2,640/sq mi)
- Time zone: UTC+01:00 (CET)
  - Summer (DST): UTC+02:00 (CEST)
- Post Code: 8890 Leirfjord

Leland is the administrative centre of Leirfjord Municipality in Nordland county, Norway. It is located on the northern shore of the Leirfjorden along Norwegian County Road 17. The town of Sandnessjøen lies about 20 kilometres (12 mi) southwest of Leland. The village of Sundøya lies to the south and the village of Bardal lies to the northeast. Leland features two small grocery stores, a hairdresser, a café, a large sports centre, Leirfjord Church, and a number of other amenities.

The 0.76-square-kilometre (190-acre) village has a population (2024) of 774 and a population density of 1,018 inhabitants per square kilometre (2,640/sq mi).
