= Åge Tovan =

Norwegian politician and footballer (born 1947)

Åge Edvin Tovan (born 21 September 1947 in Kristiansund) is a Norwegian politician for the Labour Party.

He served as a deputy representative to the Norwegian Parliament from Akershus during the terms 1993–1997, 1993–1997 and 2001–2005.

Tovan served as mayor for the municipality of Lørenskog between 2003 and 2015. Ragnhild Bergheim, former deputy mayor and also from the Labour Party, took over as mayor when Åge Tovan resigned.

In his younger days Tovan played football for Clausenengen FK, and was active in sport wrestling and athletics.
