= Bardal =

Village in Leirfjord Municipality, Norway

Bardal Bardalssjøen (historic name)
- Village
- Interactive map of Bardal
- Location within Nordland Location within Norway
- Coordinates: 66.2170°N 13.3802°E
- Country: Norway
- Region: Northern Norway
- County: Nordland
- District: Helgeland
- Municipality: Leirfjord Municipality
- Elevation: 4 m (13 ft)
- Time zone: UTC+01:00 (CET)
  - Summer (DST): UTC+02:00 (CEST)
- Post Code: 8897 Bardal

Bardal is a village in Leirfjord Municipality in Nordland county, Norway. The village is located along the south coast of the Ranfjorden, about 10 kilometres (6.2 mi) west of the village of Hemnesberget. The village surrounds the Bardalselva river which flows into the fjord. Bardal Church was built in 1887 on a hill near the mouth of the river. The Bardal area was historically part of both Nesna Municipality (to the north) and Hemnes Municipality (to the east), but it became part of Leirfjord Municipality in 1964.

== Culture ==
Wangbrygga is a folk museum located by the river outlet in Bardal. The museum has free entry and is open some days a week in the summer. The museum features a replica of an old time General Store, a cafe and a small assembly hall used for concerts, courses and meetings.

== Tourism ==
Bardal has a RV / Camping park and marked footpaths into the mountains.
