= Kjenn =

- Village
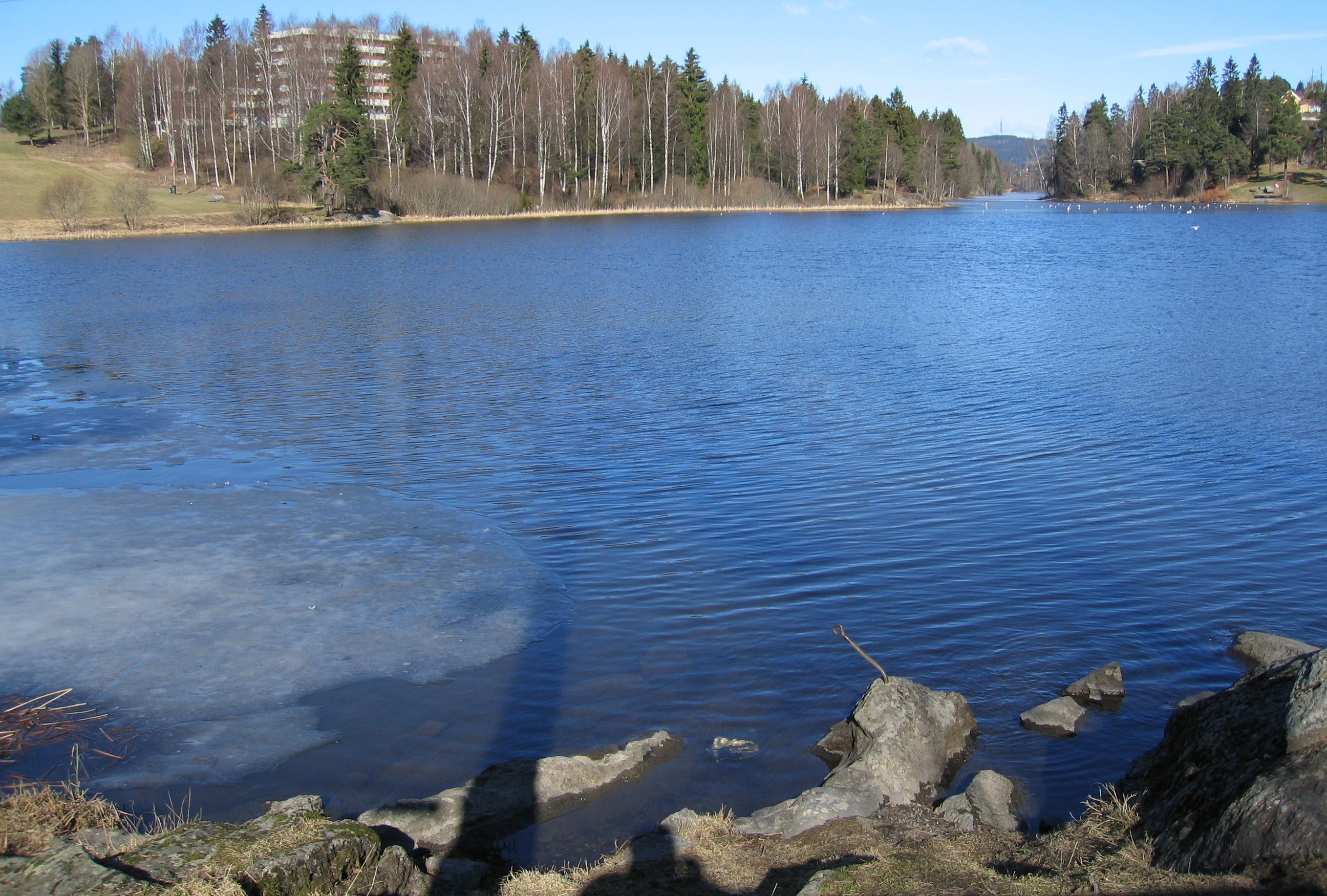
- Kjenn

- Location in Akershus
- Coordinates: 59°55′52″N 10°57′13″E
- Country: Norway
- Region: Østlandet
- County: Akershus
- Municipality: Lørenskog
- Time zone: UTC+01:00 (CET)
  - Summer (DST): UTC+02:00 (CEST)

Kjenn is a village in Lørenskog, Akershus, Norway. It is situated between the towns of Skårer, Fjellhamar and Langvannet. The village has a kindergarten, Elementary and Secondary schools.
