= Ida S. Skjelbakken =

Norwegian author and illustrator

Ida Sunniva Sandaas Skjelbakken (born October 23, 1979) is a Norwegian author and illustrator. She was born in Lørenskog and grew up in Tangen in Stange Municipality in Hedmark county.

Her first novel series, Krøniken om Ylva Alm was published in July 2012 by Schibsted Forlag and ended with 25 books in 2016. In 2014 her book Fangen på celle nr. 17, based on letters she wrote from prison, was published by Schibsted Forlag, and as a second edition by Bladkompaniet in 2016. In 2018 her novel series Nattergalen was published by Bladkompaniet and ended with 10 books. She has studied art in Villa Faraldi, Italy, and now makes book cover illustrations, editorial artwork, and illustrations for weekly magazines and children's book. She is mostly known for her illustrations for the children's book series Trollheim by Arne Lindmo, for which she won Kulturdepartementets illustrasjonspris (a prize for best children's book illustrations of the year from the Norwegian Ministry of Culture) in 2022. She is also a certified bodyguard, and has been an uchi-deshi Karate student in Okinawa, Japan.

She has lived in Eskilstuna in Sweden, Ratzeburg in Germany, The Dominican Republic, Ocala and Miami in Florida, USA, Cambridge in the United Kingdom, Szakadát in Hungary, Neaples, Villa Faraldi, Catanzaro and Agropoli in Italy. In Neaples she worked for a private investigator agency. She moved to Miami in the United States in 2005. In August 2011, she was arrested on firearms charges and for having a double identity. She was eventually deported from the United States upon her release from prison in 2012. She is married to illustrator Kjetil Nystuen and together they have two daughters.
