= Power (company) =

Nordic company headquartered in Norway

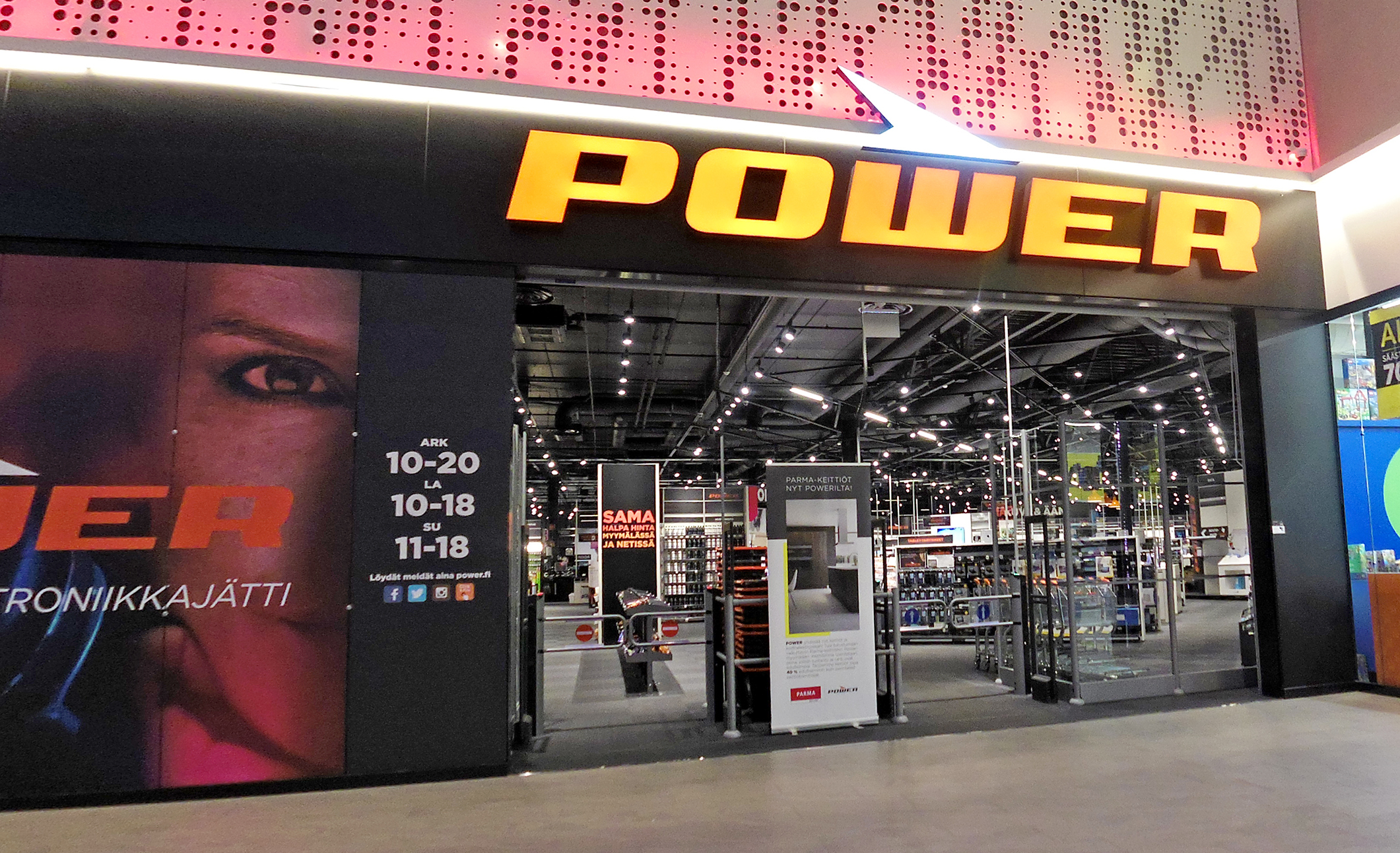
- Power in Jyväskylä
- Formerly: Expert (until 2017)
- Company type: Private
- Industry: Retail
- Founded: 1971
- Headquarters: Lørenskog, Norway
- Area served: Nordic countries
- Key people: Ronny Blomseth (CEO); Juha-Mikko Saviluoto (CEO Power Finland Oy)
- Products: Consumer electronics
- Revenue: ▲NOK 20,704,784,000 (2024)
- Operating income: ▼NOK 124,727,000 (2024)
- Net income: ▼NOK -156,027,000 (2024)
- Total assets: ▲NOK 10,189,789,000 (2024)
- Total equity: ▼NOK 875,838,000 (2024)
- Owner: Awilhelmsen AS (50%); Dolphin Invest AS (50%)
- Number of employees: 6,000 (2017)
- Website: power.no

Power International AS (formerly Expert International AS until 2017) is a Norwegian-founded Nordic company that sells consumer electronics through subsidiaries and is headquartered in Lørenskog, Norway. The company operates 269 stores across Norway, Sweden, Denmark, and Finland, each under a subsidiary for its respective country. Power is a privately-held joint-stock company owned by Awilhelmsen AS and Dolphin Invest AS.
