= Bardal Church =

Church in Nordland, Norway

- Bardal kirke
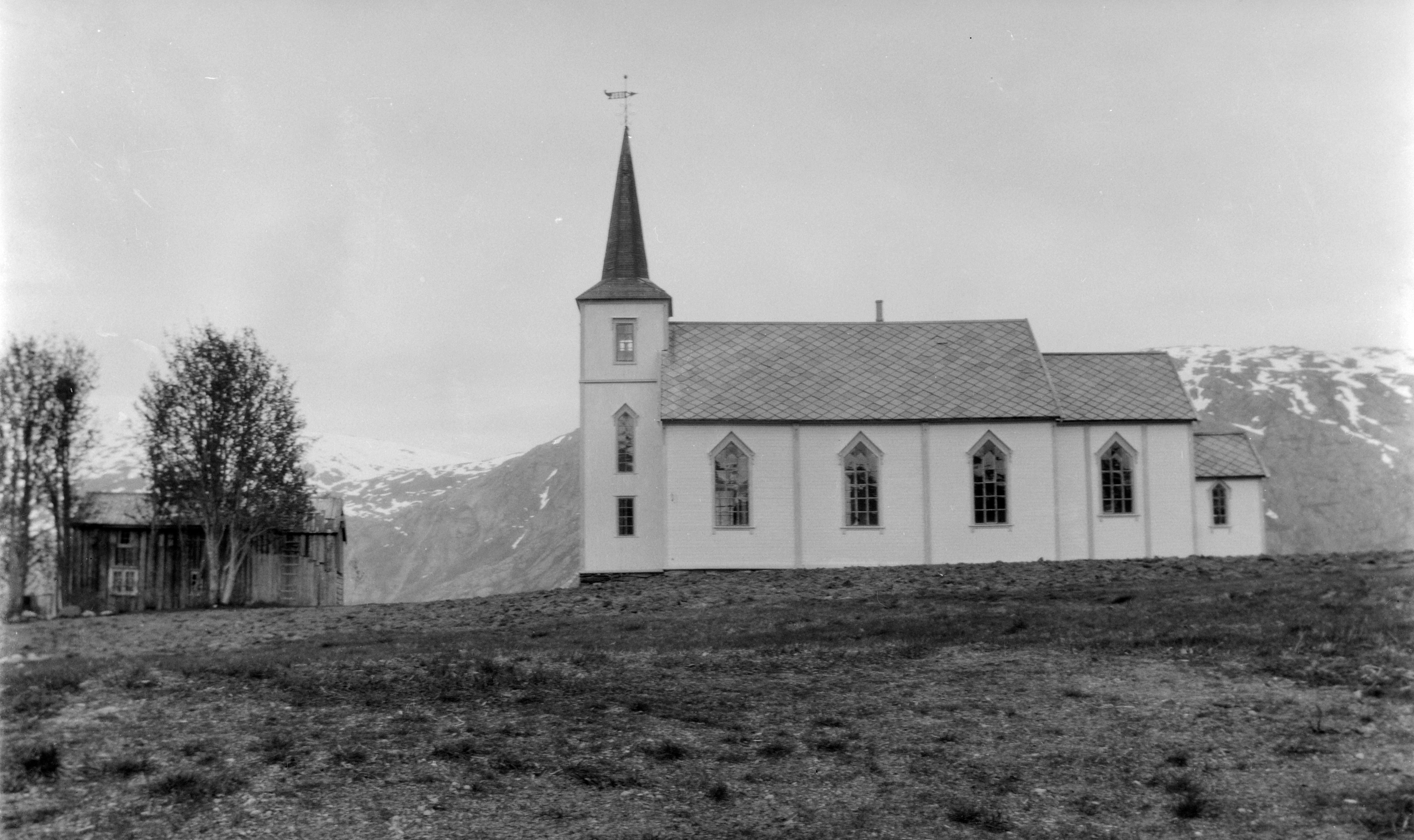
- View of the church
- Bardal Church
- 66.2182567°N 13.3870728°E
- Location: Leirfjord Municipality, Nordland
- Country: Norway
- Denomination: Church of Norway
- Churchmanship: Evangelical Lutheran

History
- Status: Parish church
- Founded: 1887
- Consecrated: 1887

Architecture
- Functional status: Active
- Architect: I.C. Olsen
- Architectural type: Long church
- Completed: 1887 (139 years ago)

Specifications
- Capacity: 250
- Materials: Wood

Administration
- Diocese: Sør-Hålogaland
- Deanery: Nord-Helgeland prosti
- Parish: Leirfjord
- Norwegian Cultural Heritage Site
- Type: Church
- Status: Not protected
- ID: 83852

Bardal Church (Norwegian: Bardal kirke) is a parish church of the Church of Norway in Leirfjord Municipality in Nordland county, Norway. It is located in the village of Bardal. It is one of the churches for the Leirfjord parish which is part of the Nord-Helgeland prosti (deanery) in the Diocese of Sør-Hålogaland. The white, wooden church was built in a long church style in 1887 using plans drawn up by the architect I. C. Olsen. The church seats about 250 people.

== See also ==
- List of churches in Sør-Hålogaland
