= Våler Municipality (Østfold) =

Våler Municipality Våler kommune
- Municipality
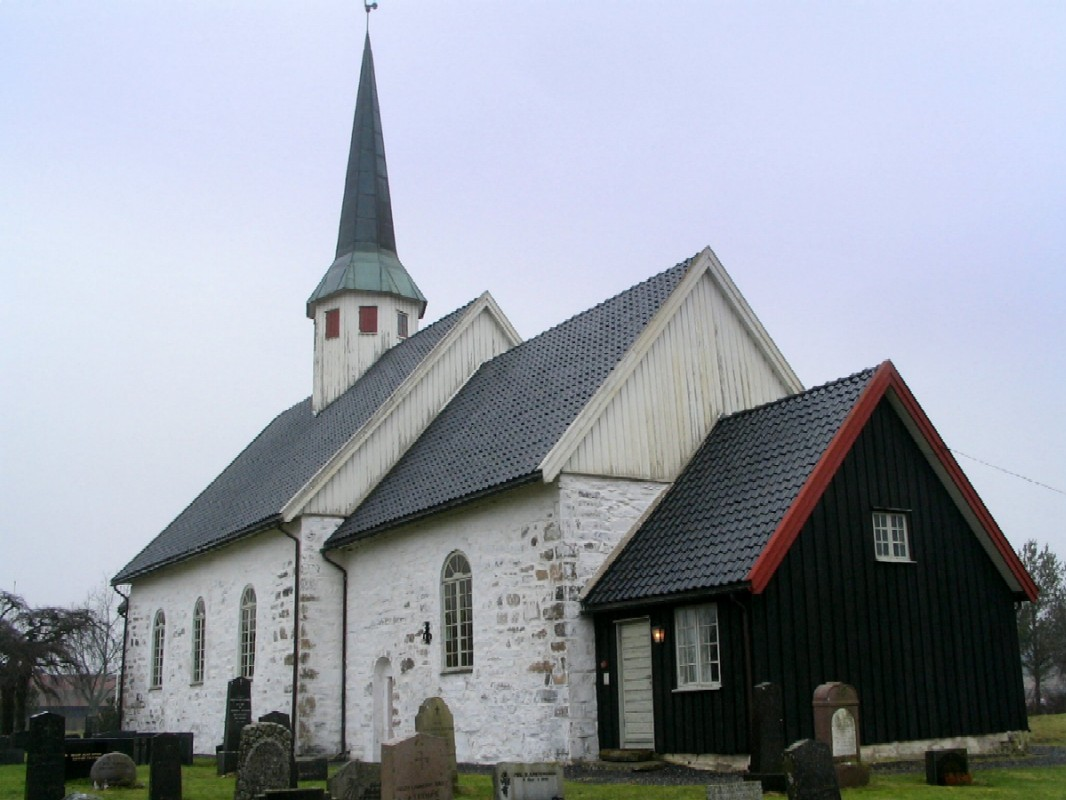
- Våler church

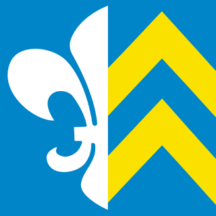
- Flag Coat of arms

- Østfold within Norway

- Våler within Østfold
- Coordinates: 59°28′21″N 10°55′1″E
- Country: Norway
- County: Østfold
- Administrative centre: Kirkebygden

Government
  - Mayor (2011): Reidar Kaabbel (Sp)

Area
  - Total: 257 km^{2} (99 sq mi)
  - Land: 239 km^{2} (92 sq mi)
  - Rank: #298 in Norway

Population (2016)
  - Total: 5,335
  - Density: 22.3/km^{2} (57.8/sq mi)
- Demonym: Vålersokning

Official language
  - Norwegian form: Bokmål
- Time zone: UTC+01:00 (CET)
  - Summer (DST): UTC+02:00 (CEST)
- ISO 3166 code: NO-3114
- Website: Official website

Våler is a municipality in Østfold county, Norway. The administrative centre of the municipality is Kirkebygden. The parish of Vaaler was established as a municipality on 1 January 1838 (see formannskapsdistrikt).

== General information ==
=== Name ===
The Old Norse form of the name was Válir. This is the plural form of váll which means "a clearing in the woods". Prior to 1921, the name was written "Vaaler".

=== Coat-of-arms ===
The coat-of-arms is from modern times. They were granted on 20 June 1986. The arms are based on the arms of the local Bolt family, who held several high functions in the 13th and 14th centuries. The arms are already seen in the seal of Agmund Berdorsson Bolt from 1400. The arms show a blue background divided in half vertically. On the left is half of a silver fleur-de-lis and on the right there are two yellow chevrons.

=== Våler Church ===
Våler Church (Våler kirke) is a medieval era church. The church was built in Romanesque style between 1150 and 1200. Over the years the church has been rebuilt and remodeled several times. One of the church's bells are probably cast before 1160. The altarpiece was given to the church in 1636. The octagonal font and ceiling above originates from 1697 and is carved in wood. The paintings hanging on the west and north walls of the nave is from around 1790.

== Minority population ==
Number of minorities (1st and 2nd generation) in Våler by country of origin in 2017
Ancestry	Number
Poland	235
Lithuania	75
Sweden	42
Bosnia-Herzegovina	38
Vietnam	36

== Notable people ==
- The Bolt family an aristocratic family in The Kingdom of Denmark-Norway from Østfold; it lasted from 1333 to 1580
- Albert Nordengen (1923 in Våler – 2004) a banker and well liked Mayor of Oslo, 1976 to 1990
- Dennis Olsen (born 1996 in Våler) a Norwegian racing driver
- Mads Østberg (born 1987 in Våler) a Norwegian rally driver

== Gallery ==
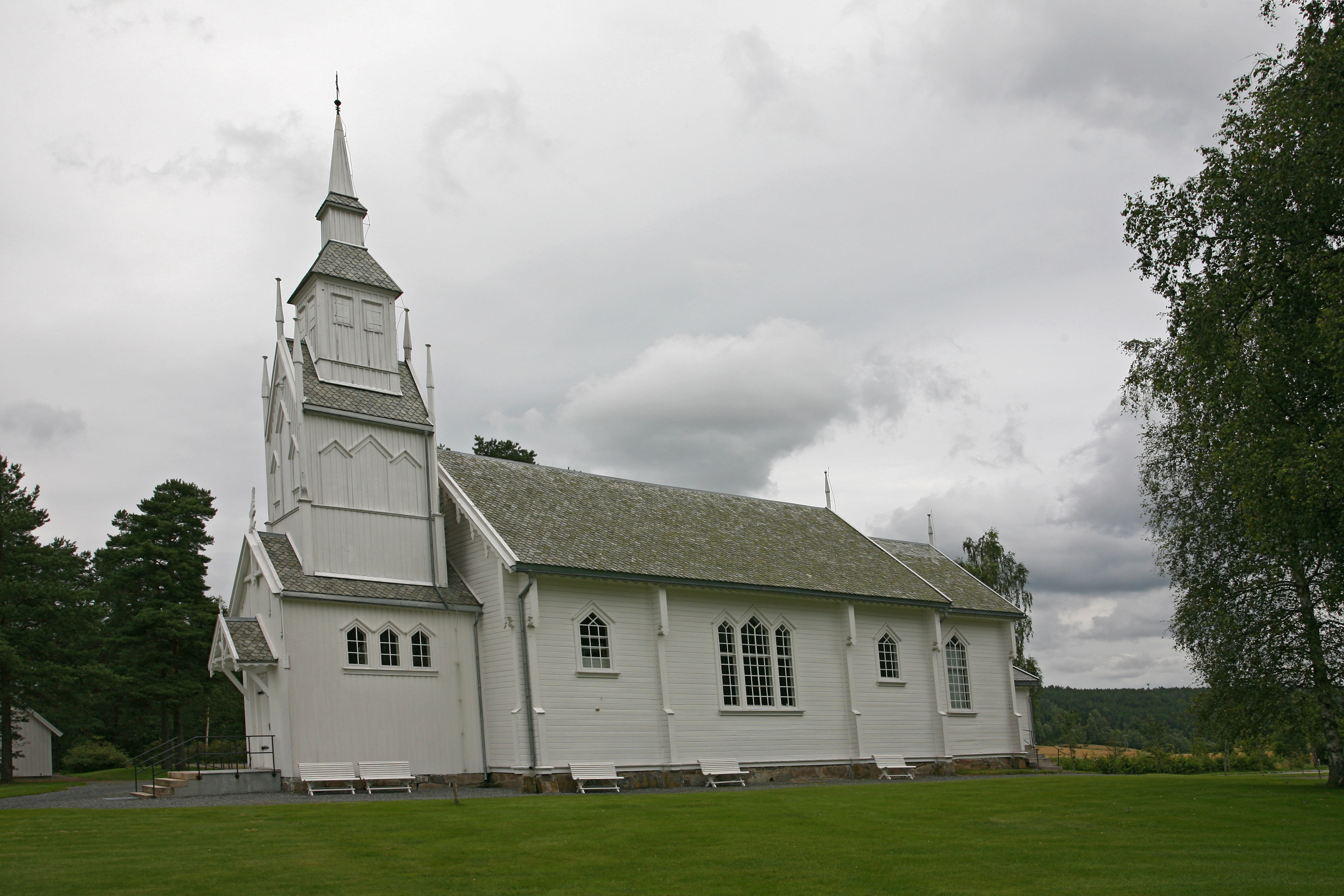
Svinndal kirke
