= List of municipalities of Norway =

Municipalities in Norway are the basic unit of local government. Norway is divided into 15 administrative regions, called counties. These counties are subdivided into 357 municipalities (as of 2024). The capital city Oslo is both a county and a municipality.

Map of municipalities (2020)

Municipalities are responsible for primary education (through 10th grade), outpatient health services, senior citizen services, welfare and other social services, zoning, economic development, and municipal roads and utilities. The municipality is governed by a municipal council of directly elected representatives. The mayor is indirectly elected by a vote of the municipal council. Law enforcement and church services are provided at a national level in Norway.

Municipalities are undergoing continuous change by dividing, consolidating, and adjusting boundaries. In 1930, there were 747 municipalities in Norway. As of 2024, there are 357 municipalities. See the list of former municipalities of Norway for further details about municipal mergers.

The consolidation effort has been underway since the work of the Schei Committee in the 1960s. This work has been complicated by a number of factors. Since block grants are made by the national government to the municipalities based on an assessment of need, there is little incentive for the municipalities to lose local autonomy. The national policy is that municipalities should only merge voluntarily, and studies are underway to identify potential gains.

== Terminology ==
There are two different writing standards in Norway: Bokmål and Nynorsk. Norwegian municipalities are named kommuner (Bokmål) or kommunar (Nynorsk) (plural) or kommune (the singular form is the same in both Bokmål and Nynorsk). The Norwegian word kommune is loaned from the French word commune, which ultimately derives from Latin word communia, communis ("common"). The Kven equivalent is kommuuni. Historically, the word herred (Bokmål) or herad (Nynorsk) was used in Norway as the name for municipalities. That word derived from the old hundred that was used all over northern Europe. Since the 1960s, that name has fallen out of use across Norway, although a small group of municipalities in the Hardanger region of Western Norway still use the name herad such as Voss herad, Ulvik herad, and Kvam herad. Ullensvang Municipality used the name herad until 2020.

Norway also has some municipalities that are bilingual or trilingual due to the presence of many native Sami people living there. In Northern Sámi, there are two words for a municipality: suohkan and gielda. Both are loan words from Scandinavian languages, the first of which is related to the Norwegian words sokn and sogn (a parish). The second term is related to the Norwegian word gjeld (prestegjeld). Lule Sámi likewise has two words for municipalities: suohkan and giellda. The Southern Sámi word is tjïelte.

== Administration ==
Each municipality has its own governmental leaders: the mayor (ordfører (Bokmål) or ordførar (Nynorsk)) and the municipal council (kommunestyre). The mayor is the executive leader. The municipal council is the deliberative and legislative body of the municipality, and it is the highest governing body in the municipality. The members of the municipal council are elected for a four-year term. A subdivision of the full council is the executive council (formannskap), composed of five members. Historically, the council has been known as a herredsstyre, using the old name for a municipality.

== Municipalities ==
Nr.	Name	Administrative Center	County	Pop. (2024)	Area (km^{2})	County map	Arms	Language form(s)	Mayor	Party
0301	Oslo Municipality	Oslo	Oslo	717,710	454.12			Neutral	Anne Lindboe	H
1101	Eigersund Municipality	Egersund	Rogaland	15,221	432.49			Bokmål	Anja Hovland	H
1103	Stavanger Municipality	Stavanger	Rogaland	149,048	262.30			Neutral	Sissel Knutsen Hegdal	H
1106	Haugesund Municipality	Haugesund	Rogaland	38,292	72.68			Bokmål	Nils Konrad Bua	H
1108	Sandnes Municipality	Sandnes	Rogaland	83,702	1040.60			Neutral	Kenny Rettore	H
1111	Sokndal Municipality	Hauge	Rogaland	3,347	294.98			Neutral	Bjørn-Inge Mydland	Sp
1112	Lund Municipality	Moi	Rogaland	3,226	408.39			Neutral	Gro Helleland	KrF
1114	Bjerkreim Municipality	Vikeså	Rogaland	2,892	650.55			Nynorsk	Tone Vaule	Ap
1119	Hå Municipality	Varhaug	Rogaland	19,827	258.00			Neutral	Andreas Bjorland	KrF
1120	Klepp Municipality	Kleppe	Rogaland	20,900	113.48			Nynorsk	Kjetil Maudal	FrP
1121	Time Municipality	Bryne	Rogaland	19,910	183.18			Nynorsk	Andreas Vollsund	H
1122	Gjesdal Municipality	Ålgård	Rogaland	12,362	617.98			Neutral	Frode Fjeldsbø	Ap
1124	Sola Municipality	Solakrossen	Rogaland	28,685	69.04			Neutral	Janne Stangeland Rege	H
1127	Randaberg Municipality	Randaberg	Rogaland	11,742	24.72			Neutral	Jarle Bø	Sp
1130	Strand Municipality	Jørpeland	Rogaland	13,703	261.79			Neutral	Irene Heng Lauvsnes	H
1133	Hjelmeland Municipality	Hjelmelandsvågen	Rogaland	2,643	1,068.08			Nynorsk	Anita Husøy Riskedal	Sp
1134	Suldal Municipality	Sand	Rogaland	3,889	1,736.27			Nynorsk	Mads Drange	Sp
1135	Sauda Municipality	Sauda	Rogaland	4,572	546.56			Nynorsk	Håvard Handeland	Ap
1144	Kvitsøy Municipality	Ydstebøhavn	Rogaland	544	6.28			Neutral	Kjell Andre Nordbø	LL
1145	Bokn Municipality	Føresvik	Rogaland	883	47.15			Nynorsk	Egil Våge	Sp
1146	Tysvær Municipality	Aksdal	Rogaland	11,570	425.48			Neutral	Monika Lindanger	H
1149	Karmøy Municipality	Kopervik	Rogaland	43,306	230.01			Neutral	Leiv Arne Marhaug	H
1151	Utsira Municipality	Utsira	Rogaland	215	6.29			Neutral	Marte Eide Klovning	Ap
1160	Vindafjord Municipality	Ølensjøen	Rogaland	8,938	620.59			Nynorsk	Ole Johan Vierdal	Sp
1505	Kristiansund Municipality	Kristiansund	Møre og Romsdal	24,404	87.44			Neutral	Kjell Neergaard	Ap
1506	Molde Municipality	Molde	Møre og Romsdal	32,816	1503.37			Neutral	Trygve Grydeland	H
1508	Ålesund Municipality	Ålesund	Møre og Romsdal	58,509	371.34			Neutral	Håkon Lykkebø Strand	FrP
1511	Vanylven Municipality	Fiskåbygd	Møre og Romsdal	3,026	385.11			Nynorsk	Paul Sindre Vedeld	Sp
1514	Sande Municipality	Larsnes	Møre og Romsdal	2,438	93.24			Nynorsk	Dag Arne Vaagen	H
1515	Herøy Municipality	Fosnavåg	Møre og Romsdal	8,968	119.53			Nynorsk	Ann-Kathrin Storøy	H
1516	Ulstein Municipality	Ulsteinvik	Møre og Romsdal	8,861	97.20			Nynorsk	Stian Skorgen Scheide	H
1517	Hareid Municipality	Hareid	Møre og Romsdal	5,322	82.27			Nynorsk	Bernt Brandal	LL
1520	Ørsta Municipality	Ørsta	Møre og Romsdal	10,958	661.58			Nynorsk	Per Are Sørheim	H
1525	Stranda Municipality	Stranda	Møre og Romsdal	4,348	865.86			Nynorsk	Einar Arve Nordang	H
1528	Sykkylven Municipality	Aure	Møre og Romsdal	7,617	337.80			Nynorsk	Olav Harald Ulstein	FrP
1531	Sula Municipality	Langevåg	Møre og Romsdal	9,720	58.51			Nynorsk	Turid Humlen	H
1532	Giske Municipality	Valderøya	Møre og Romsdal	8,691	40.58			Nynorsk	Kenneth Langvatn	H
1535	Vestnes Municipality	Vestnes	Møre og Romsdal	7,147	404.59			Nynorsk	Randi Bergundhaugen	H
1539	Rauma Municipality	Åndalsnes	Møre og Romsdal	7,299	1,449.26			Neutral	Yvonne Wold	SV
1547	Aukra Municipality	Falkhytta	Møre og Romsdal	3,678	60.66			Nynorsk	Helge Kjøll	KrF
1554	Averøy Municipality	Bruhagen	Møre og Romsdal	5,955	175.70			Neutral	Ingrid Ovidie Rangønes	Ap
1557	Gjemnes Municipality	Batnfjordsøra	Møre og Romsdal	2,700	381.63			Neutral	Knut Sjømæling	Sp
1560	Tingvoll Municipality	Tingvollvågen	Møre og Romsdal	3,041	336.81			Neutral	Ingrid Waagen	Sp
1563	Sunndal Municipality	Sunndalsøra	Møre og Romsdal	7,227	1,713.37			Neutral	Ståle Refstie	Ap
1566	Surnadal Municipality	Skei	Møre og Romsdal	5,953	1,366.03			Nynorsk	Hugo Pedersen	Sp
1573	Smøla Municipality	Hopen	Møre og Romsdal	2,159	271.91			Neutral	Svein Roksvåg	Sp
1576	Aure Municipality	Aure	Møre og Romsdal	3,408	641.28			Neutral	Hanne Berit Brekken	Ap
1577	Volda Municipality	Volda	Møre og Romsdal	11,093	876.76			Nynorsk	Sølvi Dimmen	Sp
1578	Fjord Municipality	Sylte	Møre og Romsdal	2,492	1190.58			Nynorsk	Terese Jemtegård Moen	Sp
1579	Hustadvika Municipality	Elnesvågen	Møre og Romsdal	13,437	521.93			Neutral	Nils Christian Harnes	KrF
1580	Haram Municipality	Brattvåg	Møre og Romsdal	9,357	261.19			Neutral	Vebjørn Krogsæter	Sp
1804	Bodø Municipality	Bodø	Nordland	53,712	1,395.30			Neutral	Odd Emil Ingebrigtsen	H
1806	Narvik Municipality	Narvik	Nordland	21,580	3,432.20			Neutral	Rune Edvardsen	Ap
1811	Bindal Municipality	Terråk	Nordland	1,399	1,266.07			Bokmål	Frode Næsvold	Ap
1812	Sømna Municipality	Vik	Nordland	1,976	195.19			Bokmål	Gunder Strømberg	LL
1813	Brønnøy Municipality	Brønnøysund	Nordland	7,826	1,046.03			Neutral	Siv Aglen	Ap
1815	Vega Municipality	Gladstad	Nordland	1,208	164.79			Bokmål	Jon Floa	Sp
1816	Vevelstad Municipality	Forvika	Nordland	480	539.04			Bokmål	Sivert Vevelstad	Ap
1818	Herøy Municipality	Silvalen	Nordland	1,842	64.46			Bokmål	Eldbjørg Larsen	Ap
1820	Alstahaug Municipality	Sandnessjøen	Nordland	7,421	188.16			Neutral	Peter Talseth	Sp
1822	Leirfjord Municipality	Leland	Nordland	2,352	465.26			Neutral	Sten Rino Bonsaksen	Ap
1824	Vefsn Municipality	Mosjøen	Nordland	13,469	1,929.40			Neutral	Rune Krutå	Ap
1825	Grane Municipality	Trofors	Nordland	1,447	2,004.11			Neutral	Raymond Fagerli	Sp
1826	Hattfjelldal Municipality (Note: Hattfjelldal Municipality has two co-equal interchangeable names: Aarborten tjïelte (Southern Sami) and Hattfjelldal kommune (Norwegian).)	Hattfjelldal	Nordland	1,284	2,684.35			Neutral; Southern Sámi	Sølvi Andersen	Ap
1827	Dønna Municipality	Solfjellsjøen	Nordland	1,427	192.57			Bokmål	John Erik Skjellnes Johansen	Ap
1828	Nesna Municipality	Nesna	Nordland	1,808	183.19			Bokmål	Hanne Davidsen	Ap
1832	Hemnes Municipality	Korgen	Nordland	4,485	1,589.50			Neutral	Paul Asphaug	SP
1833	Rana Municipality (Note: Rana Municipality has two co-equal interchangeable names: Rana kommune (Norwegian) and Raanen tjïelte (Southern Sami).)	Mo i Rana	Nordland	25,994	4,460.19			Neutral	Geir Waage	Ap
1834	Lurøy Municipality	Lurøy	Nordland	1,886	265.16			Bokmål	Håkon Lund	H
1835	Træna Municipality	Husøy	Nordland	442	16.54			Bokmål	Trond Vegard Sletten	Ap
1836	Rødøy Municipality	Vågaholmen	Nordland	1,139	711.29			Neutral	Inger Dagmar Monsen	LL
1837	Meløy Municipality	Ørnes	Nordland	6,180	873.83			Bokmål	Sigurd Stormo	Ap
1838	Gildeskål Municipality	Inndyr	Nordland	1,958	664.70			Neutral	Bjørn Magne Pedersen	H
1839	Beiarn Municipality	Moldjord	Nordland	1,062	1,222.31			Bokmål	Andre Kristoffersen	Sp
1840	Saltdal Municipality	Rognan	Nordland	4,880	2,216.19			Bokmål	Runar Løvdahl Jensen	Ap
1841	Fauske Municipality (Note: Fauske Municipality has two co-equal interchangeable names: Fauske kommune (Norwegian) and Fuosko suohkan (Lule Sami).)	Fauske	Nordland	9,827	1,196.98			Bokmål	Marlen Rendall Berg	Sp
1845	Sørfold Municipality (Note: Sørfold Municipality has two co-equal interchangeable names: Sørfold kommune (Norwegian) and Fuoldá suohkan (Lule Sami).)	Straumen	Nordland	1,858	1,637.41			Bokmål	Kolbjørn Mathisen	Ap
1848	Steigen Municipality	Leinesfjord	Nordland	2,672	1,009.26			Bokmål	Aase Refsnes	SV
1851	Lødingen Municipality	Lødingen	Nordland	2,060	527.41			Bokmål	Hugo Bongard Jacobsen	Ap
1853	Evenes Municipality (Note: Evenes Municipality has two co-equal interchangeable names: Evenes kommune (Norwegian) and Evenášši suohkan (Northern Sami).)	Bogen	Nordland	1,330	252.79			Bokmål	Terje Bartholsen	Ap
1856	Røst Municipality	Røstlandet	Nordland	460	10.11			Bokmål	Elisabeth Kristin Mikalsen	LL
1857	Værøy Municipality	Sørland	Nordland	683	18.64			Bokmål	Susan Berg Kristiansen	LL
1859	Flakstad Municipality	Ramberg	Nordland	1,229	178.54			Neutral	Einar Benjaminsen	LL
1860	Vestvågøy Municipality	Leknes	Nordland	11,619	424.29			Neutral	Johnny Finstad	H
1865	Vågan Municipality	Svolvær	Nordland	9,793	479.18			Neutral	Thom Benjaminsen	H
1866	Hadsel Municipality	Stokmarknes	Nordland	8,236	566.61			Bokmål	Kjell Børge Freiberg	H
1867	Bø Municipality	Straume	Nordland	2,634	246.72			Neutral	Sture Pedersen	H
1868	Øksnes Municipality	Myre	Nordland	4,569	319.60			Neutral	Elisabeth Sørdahl	H
1870	Sortland Municipality (Note: Sortland Municipality has two co-equal interchangeable names: Suorttá suohkan (Northern Sami) and Sortland kommune (Norwegian).)	Sortland	Nordland	10,618	721.94			Neutral	Grete Ellingsen	H
1871	Andøy Municipality	Andenes	Nordland	4,553	656.18			Neutral	Kjell-Are Johansen	Ap
1874	Moskenes Municipality	Reine	Nordland	954	118.78			Neutral	Hanna Sverdrup	LL
1875	Hamarøy Municipality (Note: Hamarøy Municipality has two co-equal interchangeable names: Hábmera suohkan (Lule Sami) and Hamarøy kommune (Norwegian).)	Oppeid	Nordland	2,729	2,020.44			Neutral; Lule Sámi	Britt Kristoffersen Løksa	Sp
3101	Halden Municipality	Halden	Østfold	31,935	642.48			Bokmål	Fredrik Holm	H
3103	Moss Municipality	Moss	Østfold	52,051	137.77			Neutral	Simen Nord	H
3105	Sarpsborg Municipality	Sarpsborg	Østfold	59,771	405.60			Bokmål	Magnus Arnesen	H
3107	Fredrikstad Municipality	Fredrikstad	Østfold	85,230	292.55			Bokmål	Arne Sekkelsten	H
3110	Hvaler Municipality	Skjærhalden	Østfold	4,787	90.11			Bokmål	Mona Vauger	Ap
3112	Råde Municipality	Karlshus	Østfold	7,883	118.76			Bokmål	René Rafshol	H
3114	Våler Municipality	Kirkebygden	Østfold	6,145	256.95			Bokmål	Reidar Kaabbel	Sp
3116	Skiptvet Municipality	Meieribyen	Østfold	3,919	101.20			Bokmål	Cecilie Agnalt	Ap
3118	Indre Østfold Municipality	Askim	Østfold	47,006	791.76			Bokmål	Svend Saxe Frøshaug	Sp
3120	Rakkestad Municipality	Rakkestad	Østfold	8,420	434.87			Bokmål	Karoline Fjelstad	Sp
3122	Marker Municipality	Ørje	Østfold	3,658	412.90			Bokmål	Kjersti Nythe Nilsen	Ap
3124	Aremark Municipality	Fosby	Østfold	1,347	319.26			Bokmål	Håkon Tolsby	Sp
3201	Bærum Municipality	Sandvika	Akershus	130,921	192.28			Bokmål	Lisbeth Hammer Krog	H
3203	Asker Municipality	Asker	Akershus	98,815	376.61			Neutral	Lene Conradi	H
3205	Lillestrøm Municipality	Lillestrøm	Akershus	94,201	456.60			Neutral	Kjartan Berland	H
3207	Nordre Follo Municipality	Ski	Akershus	63,560	202.99			Neutral	Cecilie Dahl-Jørgensen Pind	H
3209	Ullensaker Municipality	Jessheim	Akershus	43,814	252.44			Bokmål	Ståle Lien Hansen	FrP
3212	Nesodden Municipality	Nesoddtangen	Akershus	20,521	61.46			Bokmål	Cathrine Kjenne Forsland	Ap
3214	Frogn Municipality	Drøbak	Akershus	16,244	85.69			Bokmål	Sigbjørn Odden	H
3216	Vestby Municipality	Vestby	Akershus	19,493	133.97			Bokmål	Tom Anders Ludvigsen	Ap
3218	Ås Municipality	Ås	Akershus	22,005	102.68			Neutral	Bengt Nøst-Klemmetsen	H
3220	Enebakk Municipality	Kirkebygda	Akershus	11,482	232.58			Bokmål	Christopher Leiknes	Ap
3222	Lørenskog Municipality	Kjenn and Solheim	Akershus	48,188	70.54			Neutral	Amine Mabel Andresen	H
3224	Rælingen Municipality	Fjerdingby	Akershus	20,099	71.68			Neutral	Gro Langdalen	H
3226	Aurskog-Høland Municipality	Bjørkelangen	Akershus	18,058	1144.80			Neutral	Roger Evjen	Ap
3228	Nes Municipality	Årnes	Akershus	24,645	640.76			Bokmål	Tove Nyhus	FrP
3230	Gjerdrum Municipality	Ask	Akershus	7,398	83.19			Bokmål	Karl-Arne Johannesen	H
3232	Nittedal Municipality	Rotnes	Akershus	25,882	186.22			Bokmål	Rune Winum	H
3234	Lunner Municipality	Roa	Akershus	9,357	291.84			Bokmål	Harald Tyrdal	Ap
3236	Jevnaker Municipality	Jevnaker	Akershus	7,037	225.71			Bokmål	Morten Lafton	Ap
3238	Nannestad Municipality	Teigebyen	Akershus	16,126	340.98			Bokmål	Christian Bendz	H
3240	Eidsvoll Municipality	Sundet	Akershus	27,916	456.49			Bokmål	Nina Kristengård	H
3242	Hurdal Municipality	Hurdal	Akershus	3,041	284.95			Bokmål	Paul Johan Moltzau	Sp
3301	Drammen Municipality	Drammen	Buskerud	104,487	317.61			Neutral	Kjell Arne Hermansen	H
3303	Kongsberg Municipality	Kongsberg	Buskerud	28,848	793.09			Bokmål	Line Spiten	H
3305	Ringerike Municipality	Hønefoss	Buskerud	31,581	1,555.10			Bokmål	Runar Johansen	H
3310	Hole Municipality	Vik	Buskerud	6,989	192.68			Bokmål	Syver Leivestad	H
3312	Lier Municipality	Lierbyen	Buskerud	28,470	301.83			Bokmål	Kjetil Kivle	H
3314	Øvre Eiker Municipality	Hokksund	Buskerud	20,779	456.76			Bokmål	Adrian Kjølø Tollefsen	H
3316	Modum Municipality	Vikersund	Buskerud	14,665	517.24			Bokmål	Sunni G. Aamodt	Sp
3318	Krødsherad Municipality	Noresund	Buskerud	2,241	374.48			Neutral	Andreas Kagiavas Torp H	
3320	Flå Municipality	Flå	Buskerud	1,115	704.27			Bokmål	Merete Høntorp Gandrud	Ap
3322	Nesbyen Municipality	Nesbyen	Buskerud	3,301	809.63			Bokmål	Anne Kari Eriksen	LL
3324	Gol Municipality	Gol	Buskerud	4,986	532.50			Nynorsk	Heidi Granli	Ap
3326	Hemsedal Municipality	Trøym	Buskerud	2,666	753.51			Nynorsk	Pål Terje Rørby	Sp
3328	Ål Municipality	Ål	Buskerud	5,007	1,174.98			Nynorsk	Solveig Vestenfor	Ap
3330	Hol Municipality	Hol	Buskerud	4,496	1,854.54			Neutral	Sigrid Simensen Ilsøy	Sp
3332	Sigdal Municipality	Prestfoss	Buskerud	3,526	842.48			Bokmål	Vebjørn Aasand Seljord	Sp
3334	Flesberg Municipality	Lampeland	Buskerud	2,781	561.91			Bokmål	Oda Bakke Fossen	H
3336	Rollag Municipality	Rollag	Buskerud	1,395	449.28			Neutral	Øystein Morten	Ap
3338	Nore og Uvdal Municipality	Rødberg	Buskerud	2,486	2,502.16			Neutral	Oddvar Svendsen	FrP
3401	Kongsvinger Municipality	Kongsvinger	Innlandet	18,058	1,036.45			Bokmål	Elin Såheim Bjørkli	Ap
3403	Hamar Municipality	Hamar	Innlandet	32,879	350.93			Neutral	Vigdis Stensby	LL
3405	Lillehammer Municipality	Lillehammer	Innlandet	28,768	477.94			Bokmål	Hans Olav Sundfør	H
3407	Gjøvik Municipality	Gjøvik	Innlandet	30,903	671.10			Bokmål	Anne Bjertnes	H
3411	Ringsaker Municipality	Brumunddal	Innlandet	35,612	1,280.09			Bokmål	Kai Ove Berg	H
3412	Løten Municipality	Løten	Innlandet	7,929	369.44			Bokmål	Marte Larsen Tønseth	Sp
3413	Stange Municipality	Stangebyen	Innlandet	21,605	724.27			Bokmål	Bjarne Christiansen	Ap
3414	Nord-Odal Municipality	Sand	Innlandet	4,992	508.14			Bokmål	Odd Kjetil Østvand Sløtte	Ap
3415	Sør-Odal Municipality	Skarnes	Innlandet	8,112	516.74			Bokmål	Knut Hvithammer	Ap
3416	Eidskog Municipality	Skotterud	Innlandet	6,040	640.39			Bokmål	Kamilla Thue	Ap
3417	Grue Municipality	Kirkenær	Innlandet	4,532	837.17			Bokmål	Rune Grenberg	Ap
3418	Åsnes Municipality	Flisa	Innlandet	7,339	1,040.93			Bokmål	Einar Toverud	Sp
3419	Våler Municipality	Våler	Innlandet	3,615	705.28			Bokmål	Harry Vinje	H
3420	Elverum Municipality	Elverum	Innlandet	21,761	1,229.27			Neutral	Lilian Skjærvik	Ap
3421	Trysil Municipality	Innbygda	Innlandet	6,566	3,014.40			Bokmål	Turid Backe-Viken	Ap
3422	Åmot Municipality	Rena	Innlandet	4,289	1,339.91			Bokmål	Ole Erik Hørstad	H
3423	Stor-Elvdal Municipality	Koppang	Innlandet	2,276	2,165.77			Bokmål	Linda Otnes Henriksen	Ap
3424	Rendalen Municipality	Bergset	Innlandet	1,837	3,179.51			Bokmål	Linda Døsen	Ap
3425	Engerdal Municipality	Engerdal	Innlandet	1,361	2,196.54			Bokmål	Tor Erik Skramstad	H
3426	Tolga Municipality	Tolga	Innlandet	1,604	1,122.56			Neutral	Bjørnar Tollan Jordet	SV
3427	Tynset Municipality	Tynset	Innlandet	5,692	1,880.26			Neutral	Merete Myhre Moen	Sp
3428	Alvdal Municipality	Alvdal	Innlandet	2,526	942.15			Neutral	Mona Murud	Sp
3429	Folldal Municipality	Folldal	Innlandet	1,532	1,277.07			Neutral	Kristin Langtjernet	Ap
3430	Os Municipality	Os i Østerdalen	Innlandet	1,891	1,040.40			Neutral	Ivar Torvidsson Midtdal	Sp
3431	Dovre Municipality	Dovre	Innlandet	2,503	1,364.38			Neutral	Magne Vorkinn	Sp
3432	Lesja Municipality	Lesja	Innlandet	1,983	2,259.49			Neutral	Mariann Skotte	Sp
3433	Skjåk Municipality	Bismo	Innlandet	2,141	2,075.51			Nynorsk	Edel Kveen	Sp
3434	Lom Municipality	Fossbergom	Innlandet	2,212	1,968.55			Nynorsk	Kristian Frisvold	LL
3435	Vågå Municipality	Vågåmo	Innlandet	3,531	1,329.99			Nynorsk	Harald Sve Bjørndal	LL
3436	Nord-Fron Municipality	Vinstra	Innlandet	5,586	1,141.32			Nynorsk	Anne Marie Olstad	Ap
3437	Sel Municipality	Otta	Innlandet	5,756	905.04			Neutral	Eldri Siem	Sp
3438	Sør-Fron Municipality	Hundorp	Innlandet	3,119	742.20			Neutral	Ole Tvete Muriteigen	Sp
3439	Ringebu Municipality	Vålebru	Innlandet	4,413	1,247.57			Neutral	Arne Fossmo	Ap
3440	Øyer Municipality	Tingberg	Innlandet	5,124	640.13			Neutral	Anne Marie Sveipe	H
3441	Gausdal Municipality	Segalstad bru	Innlandet	6,177	1,191.15			Neutral	Anette Musdalslien	Sp
3442	Østre Toten Municipality	Lena	Innlandet	14,840	562.57			Bokmål	Bror Helgestad	Sp
3443	Vestre Toten Municipality	Raufoss	Innlandet	13,691	250.65			Bokmål	Tonje Bergum Jahr	Ap
3446	Gran Municipality	Jaren	Innlandet	13,593	756.65			Bokmål	Gunn Elisabeth Alm Thoresen	Ap
3447	Søndre Land Municipality	Hov	Innlandet	5,587	728.35			Bokmål	Anne Hagenborg	Ap
3448	Nordre Land Municipality	Dokka	Innlandet	6,510	955.32			Bokmål	Ola Tore Dokken	Sp
3449	Sør-Aurdal Municipality	Bagn	Innlandet	2,836	1,109.05			Neutral	Marit Hougsrud	Sp
3450	Etnedal Municipality	Bruflat	Innlandet	1,366	459.14			Neutral	Linda Mæhlum Robøle	Sp
3451	Nord-Aurdal Municipality	Fagernes	Innlandet	6,562	906.47			Neutral	Knut Arne Fjelltun	Sp
3452	Vestre Slidre Municipality	Slidre	Innlandet	2,112	457.11			Nynorsk	Haldor Ødegård	Sp
3453	Øystre Slidre Municipality	Heggenes	Innlandet	3,298	969.24			Nynorsk	Bjarne Budal	Ap
3454	Vang Municipality	Vang i Valdres	Innlandet	1,645	1,505.49			Nynorsk	Jøran Ødegård Lunde	LL
3901	Horten Municipality	Horten	Vestfold	27,939	70.95			Bokmål	Christina Bratli	Ap
3903	Holmestrand Municipality	Holmestrand	Vestfold	26,872	432.35			Bokmål	Alf Johan Svele	H
3905	Tønsberg Municipality	Tønsberg	Vestfold	59,174	329.26			Neutral	Frank Pedersen	H
3907	Sandefjord Municipality	Sandefjord	Vestfold	66,231	422.26			Bokmål	Bjørn Ole Gleditsch	H
3909	Larvik Municipality	Larvik	Vestfold	48,715	812.88			Neutral	Gulla Løken	H
3911	Færder Municipality	Borgheim	Vestfold	27,501	99.95			Neutral	Tom Mello	H
4001	Porsgrunn Municipality	Porsgrunn	Telemark	37,193	164.44			Bokmål	Janicke Andreassen	Ap
4003	Skien Municipality	Skien	Telemark	56,619	779.20			Neutral	Marius Roheim Aarvold	Ap
4005	Notodden Municipality	Notodden	Telemark	13,266	983.89			Neutral	Gry Fuglestveit	Ap
4010	Siljan Municipality	Siljan	Telemark	2,382	213.95			Bokmål	Elisabeth Hammer	KrF
4012	Bamble Municipality	Langesund	Telemark	14,269	304.38			Neutral	Jon Pieter Flølo	FrP
4014	Kragerø Municipality	Kragerø	Telemark	10,445	305.47			Neutral	Charlotte Terkelsen	R
4016	Drangedal Municipality	Prestestranda	Telemark	4,086	1,062.77			Neutral	Stine Anlaug Sætre	Sp
4018	Nome Municipality	Ulefoss	Telemark	6,539	429.67			Neutral	Linda Thorstensen	Ap
4020	Midt-Telemark Municipality	Bø i Telemark	Telemark	10,904	518.51			Nynorsk	Siri Blichfeldt Dyrland	Sp
4022	Seljord Municipality	Seljord	Telemark	2,979	715.08			Nynorsk	Solveig Abrahamsen	H
4024	Hjartdal Municipality	Sauland	Telemark	1,630	791.61			Nynorsk	Bengt Halvard Odden	Ap
4026	Tinn Municipality	Rjukan	Telemark	5,533	2,045.13			Neutral	Kathrine Haatvedt	Ap
4028	Kviteseid Municipality	Kviteseid	Telemark	2,458	708.47			Nynorsk	Tarjei Draugedal	KrF
4030	Nissedal Municipality	Treungen	Telemark	1,471	905.17			Nynorsk	Ian Parry Jones	Sp
4032	Fyresdal Municipality	Fyresdal	Telemark	1,256	1,280.02			Nynorsk	Erik Skjervagen	Ap
4034	Tokke Municipality	Dalen	Telemark	2,212	984.58			Nynorsk	Jarand Felland	Sp
4036	Vinje Municipality	Åmot	Telemark	3,851	3,105.84			Nynorsk	Jon Rikard Kleven	Sp
4201	Risør Municipality	Risør	Agder	6,825	192.97			Neutral	Kai Strat	H
4202	Grimstad Municipality	Grimstad	Agder	24,969	303.58			Bokmål	Beate Skretting	H
4203	Arendal Municipality	Arendal	Agder	46,355	270.20			Bokmål	Robert Nordli	Ap
4204	Kristiansand Municipality	Kristiansand	Agder	116,986	644.62			Neutral	Mathias Bernander	H
4205	Lindesnes Municipality	Mandal	Agder	23,690	933.56			Bokmål	Alf Erik Andersen	FrP
4206	Farsund Municipality	Farsund	Agder	9,876	262.56			Bokmål	Ingrid Merethe Williamsen	FrP
4207	Flekkefjord Municipality	Flekkefjord	Agder	9,279	544.09			Bokmål	Torbjørn Klungland	Frp
4211	Gjerstad Municipality	Gjerstad	Agder	2,444	322.14			Neutral	Steinar Pedersen	H
4212	Vegårshei Municipality	Myra	Agder	2,268	355.65			Neutral	Kjetil Torp	KrF
4213	Tvedestrand Municipality	Tvedestrand	Agder	6,323	215.04			Bokmål	Marianne Landsaas	H
4214	Froland Municipality	Blakstad	Agder	6,236	644.54			Neutral	Inger-Lene Håland	Ap
4215	Lillesand Municipality	Lillesand	Agder	11,523	190.31			Bokmål	Einar Holmen-Hoven	H
4216	Birkenes Municipality	Birkeland	Agder	5,480	637.36			Neutral	Arild Windsland	H
4217	Åmli Municipality	Åmli	Agder	1,802	1,130.61			Nynorsk	Hans Fredrik Tangen	Ap
4218	Iveland Municipality	Birketveit	Agder	1,380	261.63			Neutral	Jan Andre Myhren	H
4219	Evje og Hornnes Municipality	Evje	Agder	3,967	587.07			Neutral	Morten Haraldstad	KrF
4220	Bygland Municipality	Bygland	Agder	1,180	1,311.74			Nynorsk	Runar Granheim	Ap
4221	Valle Municipality	Valle	Agder	1,205	1,265.26			Nynorsk	Lars Tarald Myrum	Sp
4222	Bykle Municipality	Bykle	Agder	1,011	1,467.10			Nynorsk	Hans Blattman	Ap
4223	Vennesla Municipality	Vennesla	Agder	15,452	384.47			Neutral	Nils Olav Larsen	KrF
4224	Åseral Municipality	Kyrkjebygda	Agder	923	887.51			Nynorsk	Inger Lise Lund Stulien	Ap
4225	Lyngdal Municipality	Alleen	Agder	10,835	642.79			Neutral	Unni Nilsen Husøy	FrP
4226	Hægebostad Municipality	Tingvatn	Agder	1,776	461.32			Nynorsk	Jan Petter Gysland	H
4227	Kvinesdal Municipality	Liknes	Agder	6,192	963.21			Neutral	Per Sverre Kvinlaug	KrF
4228	Sirdal Municipality	Tonstad	Agder	1,873	1,554.28			Neutral	Jonny Liland	Ap
4601	Bergen Municipality	Bergen	Vestland	291,940	464.77			Neutral	Marit Warncke	H
4602	Kinn Municipality	Florø and Måløy	Vestland	17,349	811.86			Nynorsk	Bengt Solheim-Olsen	H
4611	Etne Municipality	Etnesjøen	Vestland	4,072	735.28			Nynorsk	Mette Ekrheim Bergsvåg	Sp
4612	Sveio Municipality	Sveio	Vestland	5,742	246.15			Nynorsk	Andre Mundal Haukås	H
4613	Bømlo Municipality	Svortland	Vestland	12,268	246.57			Nynorsk	Morten Helland	KrF
4614	Stord Municipality	Leirvik	Vestland	19,287	143.72			Nynorsk	Sigbjørn Framnes	FrP
4615	Fitjar Municipality	Fitjar	Vestland	3,203	142.47			Nynorsk	Wenche Tislevoll	H
4616	Tysnes Municipality	Uggdal	Vestland	2,922	255.11			Nynorsk	Synnøve Bakke	Ap
4617	Kvinnherad Municipality	Rosendal	Vestland	13,089	1,090.74			Nynorsk	Vegard Bjørnevik	H
4618	Ullensvang Municipality	Odda	Vestland	11,017	3,229.89			Nynorsk	Roald Aga Haug	Ap
4619	Eidfjord Municipality	Eidfjord	Vestland	968	1,498.24			Nynorsk	Timo Knoch	Ap
4620	Ulvik Municipality	Ulvik	Vestland	1,089	722.00			Nynorsk	Jens Olav Holven	Sp
4621	Voss Municipality	Vossevangen	Vestland	16,471	2,041.96			Nynorsk	Tonje Såkvitne	Sp
4622	Kvam Municipality	Norheimsund	Vestland	8,496	616.95			Nynorsk	Torgeir Næss	Ap
4623	Samnanger Municipality	Tysse	Vestland	2,502	269.06			Nynorsk	Karl Kollbotn	FrP
4624	Bjørnafjorden Municipality	Osøyro	Vestland	26,080	517.40			Nynorsk	Terje Søviknes	FrP
4625	Austevoll Municipality	Storebø	Vestland	5,300	117.22			Nynorsk	Bente Kari Sletten Taranger	H
4626	Øygarden Municipality	Straume	Vestland	39,768	314.52			Nynorsk	Tom Georg Indrevik	H
4627	Askøy Municipality	Kleppestø	Vestland	30,145	101.10			Neutral	Yngve Fosse	H
4628	Vaksdal Municipality	Dale	Vestland	3,852	715.37			Nynorsk	Hege Eide Vik	Sp
4629	Modalen Municipality	Mo	Vestland	384	411.98			Nynorsk	Linda Neset	LL
4630	Osterøy Municipality	Lonevåg	Vestland	8,200	255.11			Nynorsk	Lars Fjeldstad	Sp
4631	Alver Municipality	Knarvik	Vestland	29,986	679.15			Nynorsk	Sara Sekkingstad	Ap
4632	Austrheim Municipality	Årås	Vestland	2,881	57.54			Nynorsk	Morten Sognnes	H
4633	Fedje Municipality	Fedje	Vestland	519	9.27			Nynorsk	Stian Herøy	H
4634	Masfjorden Municipality	Masfjordnes	Vestland	1,694	556.08			Nynorsk	Erlend Kvamsdal	H
4635	Gulen Municipality	Eivindvik	Vestland	2,234	599.41			Nynorsk	May-Lynn Osland	Ap
4636	Solund Municipality	Hardbakke	Vestland	750	228.21			Nynorsk	Gunn Åmdal Mongstad	Sp
4637	Hyllestad Municipality	Hyllestad	Vestland	1,268	258.90			Nynorsk	Kjell	Ap
4638	Høyanger Municipality	Høyanger	Vestland	3,879	1,000.92			Nynorsk	Petter Sortland	Ap
4639	Vik Municipality	Vikøyri	Vestland	2,551	833.21			Nynorsk	Roy Egil Stadheim	Ap
4640	Sogndal Municipality	Sogndalsfjøra	Vestland	12,319	1,257.84			Nynorsk	Stig Ove Ølmheim	Ap
4641	Aurland Municipality	Aurlandsvangen	Vestland	1,800	1,467.69			Nynorsk	Kjell Bøe Bjørgum	Ap
4642	Lærdal Municipality	Lærdalsøyri	Vestland	2,160	1,342.52			Nynorsk	Audun Mo	Ap
4643	Årdal Municipality	Årdalstangen	Vestland	5,239	976.58			Nynorsk	Christian Sønstlien	Ap
4644	Luster Municipality	Gaupne	Vestland	5,371	2,706.35			Nynorsk	Andreas Wiese	Sp
4645	Askvoll Municipality	Askvoll	Vestland	2,986	326.24			Nynorsk	Ole André Klausen	H
4646	Fjaler Municipality	Dale	Vestland	2,869	416.59			Nynorsk	Leif Jarle Espedal	Ap
4647	Sunnfjord Municipality	Førde	Vestland	22,450	2,208.13			Nynorsk	Jenny Følling	Sp
4648	Bremanger Municipality	Svelgen	Vestland	3,392	833.12			Nynorsk	Anne Kristin Førde	Ap
4649	Stad Municipality	Nordfjordeid	Vestland	9,610	752.78			Nynorsk	Sigurd Erlend Reksnes	Sp
4650	Gloppen Municipality	Sandane	Vestland	5,926	1,030.53			Nynorsk	Arnar Kvernevik	Ap
4651	Stryn Municipality	Stryn	Vestland	7,271	1,382.02			Nynorsk	Per Atle Kjøllesdal	Sp
5001	Trondheim Municipality (Note: Trondheim Municipality has two co-equal interchangeable names: Trondheim kommune (Norwegian) and Tråanten tjïelte (Southern Sami).)	Trondheim	Trøndelag	214,565	528.60			Neutral	Kent Ranum	Høyre
5006	Steinkjer Municipality	Steinkjer	Trøndelag	24,032	2,122.06			Neutral	Gunnar Thorsen	Ap
5007	Namsos Municipality (Note: Namsos Municipality has two co-equal interchangeable names: Namsos kommune (Norwegian) and Nåavmesjenjaelmien tjïelte (Southern Sami).)	Namsos	Trøndelag	15,083	2132.36			Neutral	Amund Lein	H
5014	Frøya Municipality	Sistranda	Trøndelag	5,453	241.32			Bokmål	Kristin Furunes Strømskog	H
5020	Osen Municipality	Steinsdalen	Trøndelag	898	387.10			Bokmål	Håvard Strand	LL
5021	Oppdal Municipality	Oppdal	Trøndelag	7,389	2,274.11			Neutral	Elisabeth Hals	V
5022	Rennebu Municipality	Berkåk	Trøndelag	2,484	947.95			Neutral	Per Arne Lium	Sp
5025	Røros Municipality (Note: Røros Municipality has two co-equal interchangeable names: Rossen tjïelte (Southern Sami) and Røros kommune (Norwegian).)	Røros	Trøndelag	5,685	1,956.53			Neutral; Southern Sámi	Isak Veierud Busch	Ap
5026	Holtålen Municipality	Renbygda	Trøndelag	2,035	1,209.58			Neutral	Jan Arild Sivertsgård	Ap
5027	Midtre Gauldal Municipality	Støren	Trøndelag	6,140	1,860.43			Bokmål	Trude Heggdal	Ap
5028	Melhus Municipality	Melhus	Trøndelag	17,560	694.41			Neutral	Einar Gimse-Syrstad	Ap
5029	Skaun Municipality	Børsa	Trøndelag	8,484	224.20			Neutral	Gunn Iversen Stokke	Sp
5031	Malvik Municipality	Hommelvik	Trøndelag	14,783	168.43			Bokmål	Eugen Gravningen Sørmo	H
5032	Selbu Municipality	Mebonden	Trøndelag	4,216	1,234.84			Neutral	Ole Morten Balstad	Ap
5033	Tydal Municipality	Ås	Trøndelag	773	1,328.64			Bokmål	Kvello, Jens Arne	Sp
5034	Meråker Municipality	Midtbygda	Trøndelag	2,454	1,273.94			Bokmål	Kari Anita Furunes	Sp
5035	Stjørdal Municipality	Stjørdalshalsen	Trøndelag	24,717	938.27			Neutral	Eli Arnstad	Sp
5036	Frosta Municipality	Frosta	Trøndelag	2,645	76.32			Neutral	Frode Revhaug	H
5037	Levanger Municipality (Note: Levanger Municipality has two co-equal interchangeable names: Levanger kommune (Norwegian) and Levangken tjïelte (Southern Sami).)	Levanger	Trøndelag	20,574	645.80			Neutral	Anita Ravlo Sand	Sp
5038	Verdal Municipality	Verdalsøra	Trøndelag	15,193	1,547.81			Neutral	Knut Snorre Sandnes	H
5041	Snåsa Municipality (Note: Snåsa Municipality has two co-equal interchangeable names: Snåasen tjïelte (Southern Sami) and Snåsa kommune (Norwegian).)	Snåsa	Trøndelag	2,114	2,342.66			Neutral; Southern Sámi	Arnt Einar Bardal	Sp
5042	Lierne Municipality	Sandvika	Trøndelag	1,301	2,961.70			Neutral	Tor Erling Inderdal	Sp
5043	Røyrvik Municipality (Note: Røyrvik Municipality has two co-equal interchangeable names: Raarvihken tjïelte (Southern Sami) and Røyrvik kommune (Norwegian).)	Røyrvik	Trøndelag	423	1,584.74			Neutral; Southern Sámi	Kennet Tømmermo Reitan	LL
5044	Namsskogan Municipality	Namsskogan	Trøndelag	810	1,417.15			Neutral	Elisabeth Vollmo Bjørhusdal	LL
5045	Grong Municipality	Medjå	Trøndelag	2,322	1,136.16			Neutral	Ann Jeanett Klinkenberg	Ap
5046	Høylandet Municipality	Høylandet	Trøndelag	1,222	754.68			Neutral	Ole Joar Flaat	Sp
5047	Overhalla Municipality	Ranemsletta	Trøndelag	3,924	730.05			Neutral	Hege Kristin Kværnø Saugen	Sp
5049	Flatanger Municipality	Lauvsnes	Trøndelag	1,116	458.71			Neutral	Olav Jørgen Bjørkås	Sp
5052	Leka Municipality	Leknes	Trøndelag	604	110.12			Neutral	Svein Pettersen	Sp
5053	Inderøy Municipality	Straumen	Trøndelag	6,938	365.67			Neutral	Unn-Elisabeth Tronstad	Ap
5054	Indre Fosen Municipality	Årnset	Trøndelag	10,023	1,095.97			Neutral	Oskar Småvik	H
5055	Heim Municipality	Kyrksæterøra	Trøndelag	6,093	1,024.55			Neutral	Marit Liabø Sandvik	Ap
5056	Hitra Municipality	Fillan	Trøndelag	5,323	755.89			Neutral	John Lernes	Ap
5057	Ørland Municipality	Bjugn and Brekstad	Trøndelag	10,522	457.15			Bokmål	Hallgeir Grøntvedt	Sp
5058	Åfjord Municipality	Årnes	Trøndelag	4,339	1,329.43			Neutral	Erling Iversen	Sp
5059	Orkland Municipality	Orkanger	Trøndelag	18,793	1,906.28			Neutral	Hanne Nyhus	Ap
5060	Nærøysund Municipality	Kolvereid and Rørvik	Trøndelag	9,968	1,346.20			Neutral	Amund Hellesø	Ap
5061	Rindal Municipality	Rindal	Trøndelag	1,958	631.94			Neutral	Mildrid Kattem Aune	Sp
5501	Tromsø Municipality	Tromsø	Troms	78,745	2,520.80			Neutral	Gunnar Wilhelmsen	Ap
5503	Harstad Municipality (Note: Harstad Municipality has two co-equal interchangeable names: Harstad kommune (Norwegian) and Hársttáid suohkan (Northern Sami).)	Harstad	Troms	25,056	445.27			Neutral	Kari-Anne Opsal	Ap
5510	Kvæfjord Municipality	Borkenes	Troms	2,845	512.62			Neutral	Birger Holand	Sp
5512	Tjeldsund Municipality (Note: Tjeldsund Municipality has two co-equal interchangeable names: Dielddanuorri suohkan (Northern Sami) and Tjeldsund kommune (Norwegian).)	Evenskjer	Troms	4,281	814.41			Bokmål	Robin Ridderseth	LL
5514	Ibestad Municipality	Hamnvik	Troms	1,311	241.15			Bokmål	Jim Kristiansen	H
5516	Gratangen Municipality (Note: Gratangen Municipality has two co-equal interchangeable names: Lavangen kommune (Norwegian) and Rivttága suohkan (Northern Sami).)	Årstein	Troms	1,070	312.76			Neutral	Anita Karlsen	Sp
5518	Lavangen Municipality (Note: Lavangen Municipality has two co-equal interchangeable names: Loabága suohkan (Northern Sami) and Lavangen kommune (Norwegian).)	Tennevoll	Troms	986	301.62			Neutral; Northern Sami	Hege Beate Rollmoen	Ap
5520	Bardu Municipality	Setermoen	Troms	3,986	2,703.89			Neutral	Toralf Heimdal	Sp
5522	Salangen Municipality	Sjøvegan	Troms	2,069	458.07			Neutral	Simon Løvhaug	Sp
5524	Målselv Municipality	Moen	Troms	6,714	3,324.45			Neutral	Martin Nymo	H
5526	Sørreisa Municipality	Sørreisa	Troms	3,485	362.97			Neutral	Jan-Eirik Nordahl	Ap
5528	Dyrøy Municipality	Brøstadbotn	Troms	1,073	288.64			Bokmål	Kjell-Sverre Myrvoll	Sp
5530	Senja Municipality	Finnsnes	Troms	14,894	1,946.09			Neutral	Geir Inge Sivertsen	H
5532	Balsfjord Municipality	Storsteinnes	Troms	5,571	1,496.99			Bokmål	Laila Monica Johannesen	Sp
5534	Karlsøy Municipality	Hansnes	Troms	2,237	1,091.60			Neutral	Mona Benjaminsen	Ap
5536	Lyngen Municipality	Lyngseidet	Troms	2,743	812.70			Neutral	Eirik Larsen	LL
5538	Storfjord Municipality (Note: Storfjord Municipality has three co-equal interchangeable names: Storfjord kommune (Norwegian), Omasvuona suohkan (Northern Sami), and Omasvuonon kunta (Kven).)	Hatteng	Troms	1,825	1,542.73			Neutral; Northern Sami; Kven	Geir Varvik	H
5540	Kåfjord Municipality (Note: Kåfjord Municipality has three co-equal interchangeable names: Gáivuona suohkan (Northern Sami), Kåfjord kommune (Norwegian), and Kaivuonon komuuni (Kven).)	Olderdalen	Troms	1,974	991.15			Bokmål; Northern Sami; Kven	Bernt E. Isaksen Lyngstad	Ap
5542	Skjervøy Municipality	Skjervøy	Troms	2,794	474.00			Bokmål	Ørjan Albrigtsen	KrF
5544	Nordreisa Municipality (Note: Nordreisa Municipality has three co-equal interchangeable names: Nordreisa kommune (Norwegian), Ráissa suohkan (Northern Sami), and Raisin komuuni (Kven).)	Storslett	Troms	4,794	3,437.77			Bokmål	Hilde Anita Nyvoll	Ap
5546	Kvænangen Municipality	Burfjord	Troms	1,157	2,109.68			Neutral	Kai Petter Johansen	SV
5601	Alta Municipality	Alta	Finnmark	21,708	3,848.82			Bokmål	Monica Nielsen	Ap
5603	Hammerfest Municipality (Note: Hammerfest Municipality has two co-equal interchangeable names: Hammerfeastta suohkan (Northern Sami) and Hammerfest kommune (Norwegian).)	Hammerfest	Finnmark	11,338	2,692.81			Neutral	Terje Rogde	H
5605	Sør-Varanger Municipality	Kirkenes	Finnmark	10,063	3,971.42			Bokmål	Magnus Mæland	H
5607	Vadsø Municipality	Vadsø	Finnmark	5,807	1,258.06			Bokmål	Wenche Pedersen	Ap
5610	Karasjok Municipality (Note: Karasjok Municipality has two co-equal interchangeable names: Kárášjoga gielda (Northern Sami) and Karasjok kommune (Norwegian).)	Karasjok	Finnmark	2,565	5,452.94			Bokmål; Northern Sami	Svein Atle Somby	Ap
5612	Kautokeino Municipality (Note: Guovdageaidnu–Kautokeino Municipality has two co-equal interchangeable names: Guovdageainnu suohkan (Northern Sami) and Kautokeino kommune (Norwegian).)	Kautokeino	Finnmark	2,848	9,707.35			Bokmål; Northern Sami	Anders S. Buljo	LL
5614	Loppa Municipality	Øksfjord	Finnmark	864	689.27			Bokmål	Cato Kristiansen	SV
5616	Hasvik Municipality	Breivikbotn	Finnmark	979	555.43			Bokmål	Lars Hustad	LL
5618	Måsøy Municipality	Havøysund	Finnmark	1,113	1,137.19			Bokmål	Ingrid Majala	LL
5620	Nordkapp Municipality	Honningsvåg	Finnmark	2,951	926.59			Neutral	Jan Morten Hansen	Ap
5622	Porsanger Municipality (Note: Porsanger Municipality has three co-equal interchangeable names: Porsanger kommune (Norwegian), Porsáŋggu gielda (Northern Sami), and Porsangin komuuni (Kven).)	Lakselv	Finnmark	3,889	4,874.29			Bokmål; Northern Sami; Kven	Jo Inge Hesjevik	H
5624	Lebesby Municipality	Kjøllefjord	Finnmark	1,215	3,460.50			Bokmål	Sigurd Kvammen Rafaelsen	Ap
5626	Gamvik Municipality	Mehamn	Finnmark	1,070	1416.55			Neutral	Ragnhild Vassvik	Ap
5628	Tana Municipality (Note: Tana Municipality has two co-equal interchangeable names: Deanu gielda (Northern Sami) and Tana kommune (Norwegian).)	Tana bru	Finnmark	2,807	4,051.28			Bokmål; Northern Sami	Jon Erland Balto	Sp
5630	Berlevåg Municipality	Berlevåg	Finnmark	892	1121.77			Bokmål	Rolf Laupstad	Ap
5632	Båtsfjord Municipality	Båtsfjord	Finnmark	2,113	1,435.12			Neutral	Øyvind Hauken	LL
5634	Vardø Municipality	Vardø	Finnmark	1,972	600.85			Bokmål	Tor Erik Labahå	Sp
5636	Nesseby Municipality (Note: Nesseby Municipality has two co-equal interchangeable names: Unjárgga gielda (Northern Sami) and Nesseby kommune (Norwegian).)	Varangerbotn	Finnmark	859	1,437.07			Bokmål; Northern Sami	Berit Ranveig Nilssen	LL
Notes: There are a number of Norwegian municipalities that have more than one official name.

== See also ==
- List of the most populated municipalities in the Nordic countries
