= Amine Mabel Andresen =

Norwegian politician

Mayor of Lørenskog
- Incumbent
- Assumed office 18 October 2023
- Deputy: Bjørnar Johannessen
- Preceded by: Ragnhild Bergheim

Personal details
- Born: 23 September 1976 (age 49)
- Party: Conservative

Amine Mabel Bekkan Andresen (born 23 September 1976) is a Norwegian politician from the Conservative Party (H). She is the current mayor of Lørenskog municipality since 2023.

== Career ==
Andresen became mayor of Lørenskog municipality after the 2023 Norwegian local elections and she became the first non-Labour Party mayor of Lørenskog in 20 years.
