= Leirfjord Church =

Church in Nordland, Norway

- Leirfjord kirke
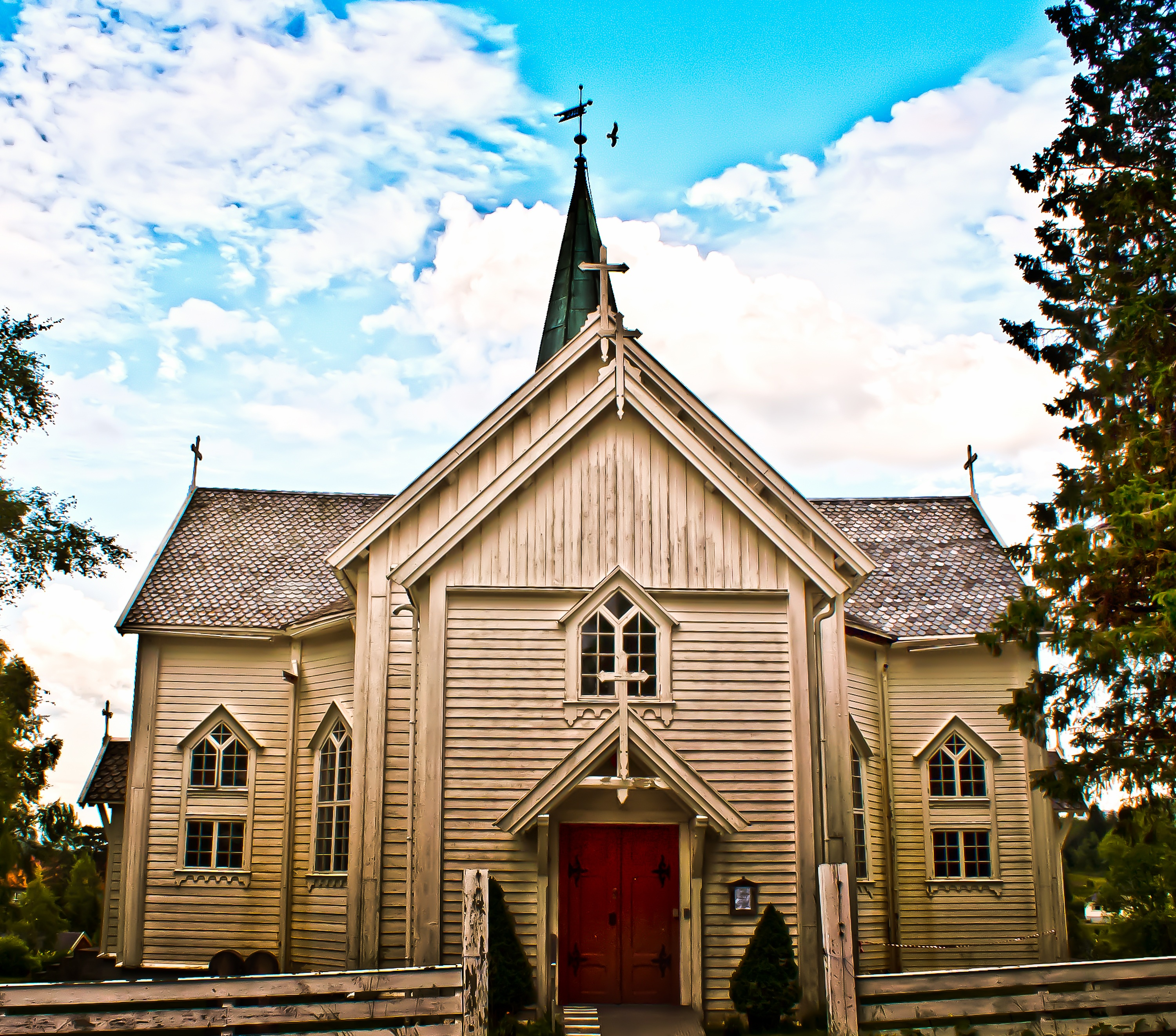
- View of the church
- Leirfjord Church
- 66.06215625°N 12.93778538°E
- Location: Leirfjord Municipality, Nordland
- Country: Norway
- Denomination: Church of Norway
- Churchmanship: Evangelical Lutheran

History
- Former name: Leland kirke
- Status: Parish church
- Founded: 1867
- Consecrated: 27 Aug 1867

Architecture
- Functional status: Active
- Architect: Niels Eckhoff
- Architectural type: Cruciform
- Completed: 1867 (159 years ago)

Specifications
- Capacity: 450
- Materials: Wood

Administration
- Diocese: Sør-Hålogaland
- Deanery: Nord-Helgeland prosti
- Parish: Leirfjord
- Norwegian Cultural Heritage Site
- Type: Church
- Status: Not protected
- ID: 84282

Leirfjord Church (Norwegian: Leirfjord kirke) is a parish church of the Church of Norway in Leirfjord Municipality in Nordland county, Norway. It is located in the village of Leland. It is the main church for the Leirfjord parish which is part of the Nord-Helgeland prosti (deanery) in the Diocese of Sør-Hålogaland. The wooden church was built in a cruciform style in 1867 using plans drawn up by the architect Niels Stockfleth Darre Eckhoff. The church seats about 450 people.

== History ==
The first church in Leirfjord was constructed in 1867 and was consecrated on 27 August 1867. Over time, the movement of the ground due to the frost, contributed to some structural damage. There was also a leak along one of the chimneys. Restoration and repair work was scheduled to begin in 1937, but due to the German occupation in World War II, the work did not begin until 1950 after the war was over. At that time, the building received frost-proofing by extending the foundation deeper below the frost line. New chimneys were constructed outside the walls of the building. The floor was replaced and insulated from underneath in the newly dug out basement. The tower was also in poor condition so it was replaced. This whole renovation cost about 150,000 kr.

== See also ==
- List of churches in Sør-Hålogaland
