= Stanislaus Bergheim =

German footballer

Personal information
- Date of birth: 18 August 1984 (age 42)
- Place of birth: Krasnaya Gorka, Soviet Union
- Height: 1.80 m (5 ft 11 in)
- Position: Forward

Youth career
- TSV 1846 Ellwangen
- FC Röhlingen 1948
- –2005: 1. FC Normannia Schwäbisch Gmünd

Senior career*
Years	Team	Apps	(Gls)
2005–2006	Bonner SC	16	(3)
2006–2008	Karlsruher SC II	49	(9)
2008–2009	1. FC Heidenheim	14	(3)
2009–2011	1. FC Normannia Schwäbisch Gmünd	62	(27)
2011–2013	VfR Aalen	25	(1)
2013–2019	TSV Essingen	151	(91)
2019–2020	TSV Ilshofen	15	(1)
2020–2021	1. FC Bruchsal	5	(1)
- * Club domestic league appearances and goals

Stanislaus Bergheim (born 18 August 1984) is a German footballer.
