= Kirkebygden =

Settlement in Våler Municipality, Norway

Coordinates: 59.489°N 10.870°E

Kirkebygden is a village and the administrative centre of Våler municipality, Østfold, Norway. Its population as of 2005 was 738.

Its population rose to 1,612 in 2024, having almost doubled between 2007 and 2021. The village is centered around Våler Church (hence the name), with built-up areas west, east and south of the church. Kirkebygden is served by County Road 121.
