= Leirfjord Municipality =

Municipality in Nordland, Norway

Leirfjord Municipality Leirfjord kommune
- Municipality
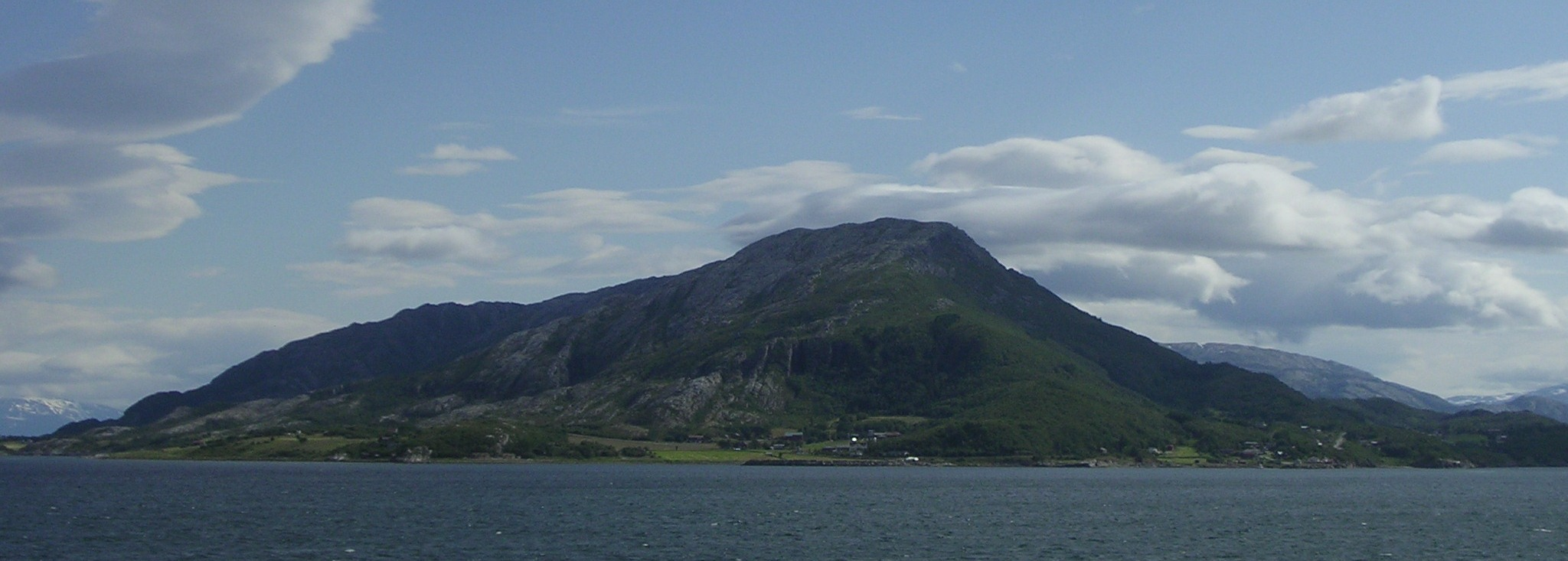
- View of Angerneset in western Leirfjord

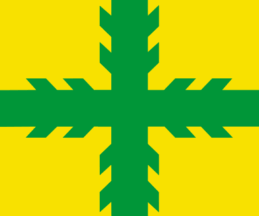
- Flag Coat of arms

- Nordland within Norway

- Leirfjord within Nordland
- Coordinates: 66°06′46″N 13°07′51″E
- Country: Norway
- County: Nordland
- District: Helgeland
- Established: 1 July 1915
  - Preceded by: Stamnes Municipality
- Administrative centre: Leland

Government
  - Mayor (2023): Kay Rune Nersund (FrP)

Area
  - Total: 465.26 km^{2} (179.64 sq mi)
  - Land: 450.82 km^{2} (174.06 sq mi)
  - Water: 14.44 km^{2} (5.58 sq mi) 3.1%
  - Rank: #212 in Norway
- Highest elevation: 994.9 m (3,264 ft)

Population (2024)
  - Total: 2,352
  - Rank: #263 in Norway
  - Density: 5.1/km^{2} (13/sq mi)
  - Change (10 years): ▲ +7.5%
- Demonym: Leirfjording

Official language
  - Norwegian form: Neutral
- Time zone: UTC+01:00 (CET)
  - Summer (DST): UTC+02:00 (CEST)
- ISO 3166 code: NO-1822
- Website: Official website

Leirfjord is a municipality in Nordland county, Norway. It is part of the Helgeland traditional region. The administrative centre of the municipality is the village of Leland. Other villages in Leirfjord include Bardal and Sundøya. The large Helgeland Bridge is partly located in the municipality, connecting it to Alstahaug Municipality and the town of Sandnessjøen.

The 465-square-kilometre (180 sq mi) municipality is the 212th largest by area out of the 357 municipalities in Norway. Leirfjord Municipality is the 263rd most populous municipality in Norway with a population of 2,352. The municipality's population density is 5.1 inhabitants per square kilometre (13/sq mi) and its population has increased by 7.5% over the previous 10-year period.

== General information ==
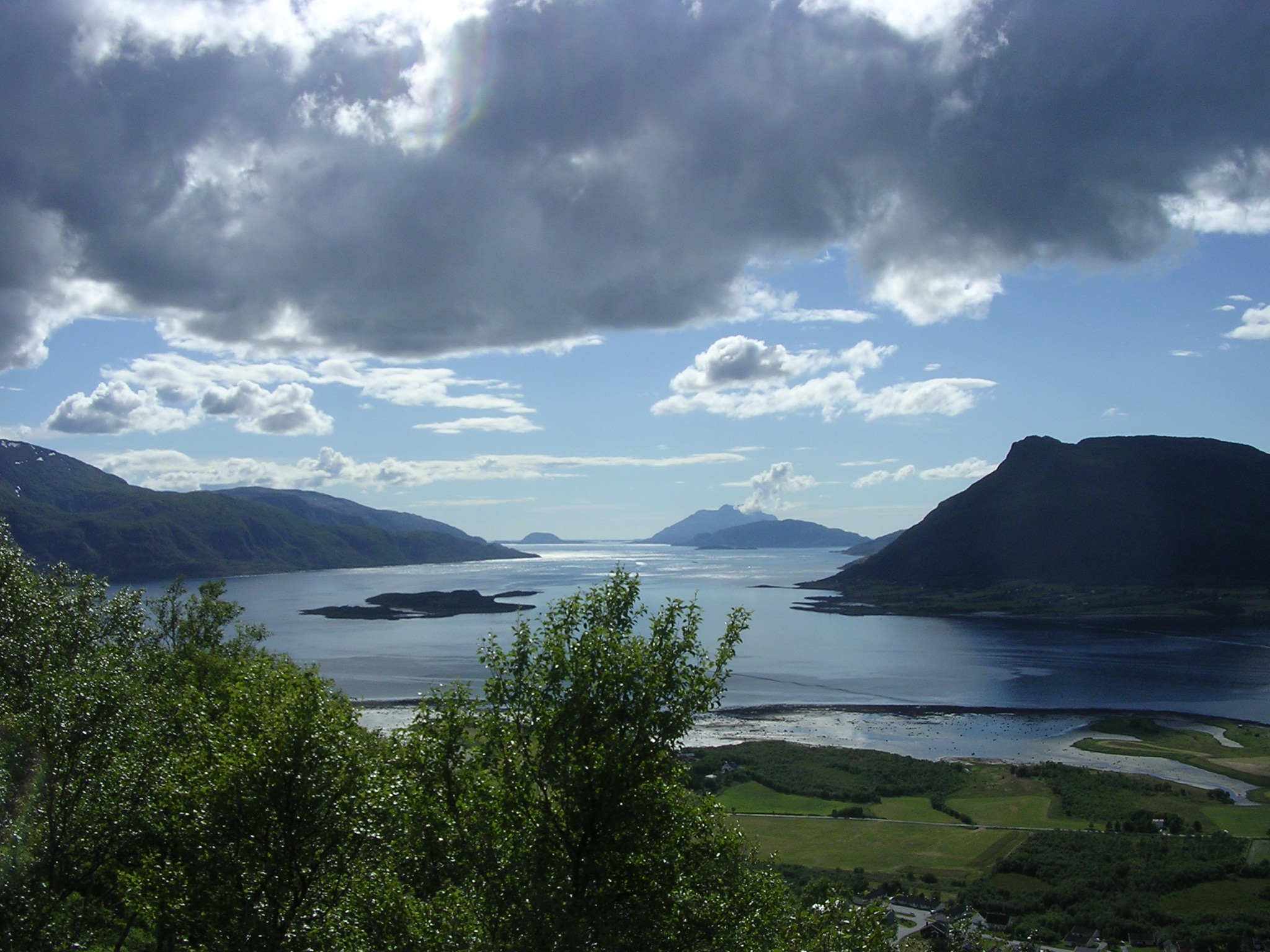
View of the Ranfjorden

The municipality of Leirfjord was established on 1 July 1915 when it was separated from Stamnes Municipality. Initially, the municipality had 2,003 residents. In 1945, a small part of Nesna Municipality (population: 45) was merged into Leirfjord Municipality. During the 1960s, there were many municipal mergers across Norway due to the work of the Schei Committee. On 1 January 1964, Leirfjord Municipality (population: 1,936) was merged with the parts of Nesna Municipality located south of the Ranfjorden (population: 580) and the parts of Tjøtta Municipality on the island of Alsta (population: 180) to form a new, larger Leirfjord Municipality.

=== Name ===
The municipality is named after the Leirfjorden. The old name of the fjord was probably just Leiri, derived from the name of the river Leira, which has its mouth in the end of the fjord. The river name is derived from the word leirr which means "clay".

=== Coat of arms ===
The coat of arms was granted on 30 October 1992. The official blazon is "Or, a cross raguly vert" (Norwegian: I gull et grønt grenkors). This means the arms have a field (background) that has a tincture of Or which means it is commonly colored yellow, but if it is made out of metal, then gold is used. The charge is cross with edges that are designed with a raguly edge. It symbolizes forestry and agriculture in the municipality as well as the central location of the north–south and east–west roads through the municipality. The arms were designed by Jarle E. Henriksen from the nearby town of Sandnessjøen.

=== Churches ===
The Church of Norway has one parish (sokn) within Leirfjord Municipality. It is part of the Nord-Helgeland prosti (deanery) in the Diocese of Sør-Hålogaland.

Churches in Leirfjord Municipality
Parish (sokn)	Church name	Location of the church	Year built
Leirfjord	Bardal Church	Bardal	1887
Leirfjord	Leirfjord Church	Leland	1867

== Geography ==
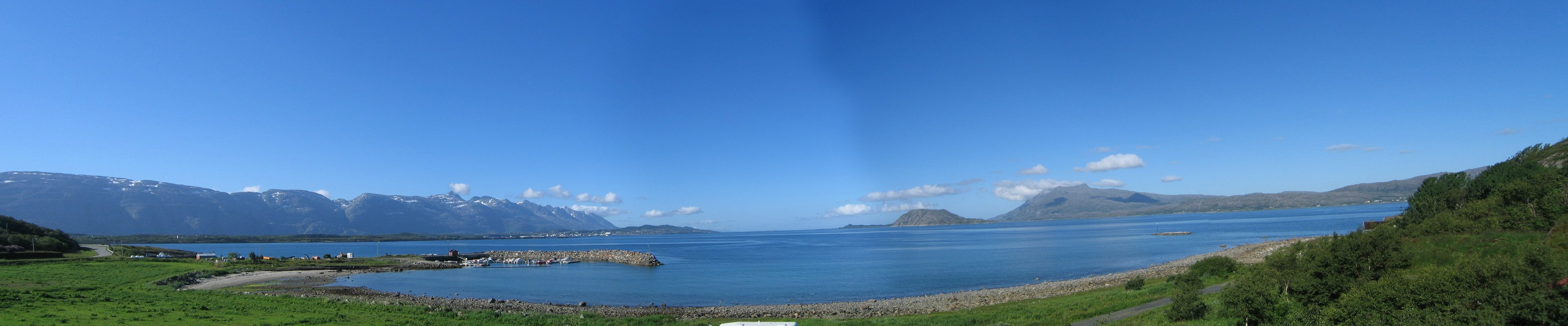
Panoramic view from Leirfjord

The municipality of Leirfjord is centered on the Leirfjorden, with most of the municipality on the mainland and a small part on the northeastern part of the island of Alsta. The Sundøy Bridge connects the mainland to the northeastern part of the island of Alsta and the Helgeland Bridge connects it to the rest of Alsta and the town of Sandnessjøen. The Ranfjorden runs along the northern part of Leirfjord and the Vefsnfjorden runs along the southern part of the municipality. The highest point in the municipality is the 994.9-metre (3,264 ft) tall mountain Nordtoven, on the border with Vefsn Municipality.

== Government ==
Leirfjord Municipality is responsible for primary education (through 10th grade), outpatient health services, senior citizen services, welfare and other social services, zoning, economic development, and municipal roads and utilities. The municipality is governed by a municipal council of directly elected representatives. The mayor is indirectly elected by a vote of the municipal council. The municipality is under the jurisdiction of the Helgeland District Court and the Hålogaland Court of Appeal.

=== Municipal council ===
The municipal council (Kommunestyre) of Leirfjord Municipality is made up of 19 representatives that are elected to four year terms. The tables below show the current and historical composition of the council by political party.

Leirfjord kommunestyre 2023–2027
Party name (in Norwegian)	Number of representatives
Labour Party (Arbeiderpartiet)	7
Progress Party (Fremskrittspartiet)	3
Red Party (Rødt)	1
Centre Party (Senterpartiet)	6
Socialist Left Party (Sosialistisk Venstreparti)	2
Total number of members:	19

Leirfjord kommunestyre 2019–2023
Party name (in Norwegian)	Number of representatives
Labour Party (Arbeiderpartiet)	8
Progress Party (Fremskrittspartiet)	2
Red Party (Rødt)	1
Centre Party (Senterpartiet)	7
Socialist Left Party (Sosialistisk Venstreparti)	1
Total number of members:	19

Leirfjord kommunestyre 2015–2019
Party name (in Norwegian)	Number of representatives
Labour Party (Arbeiderpartiet)	9
Progress Party (Fremskrittspartiet)	2
Conservative Party (Høyre)	1
Centre Party (Senterpartiet)	5
Socialist Left Party (Sosialistisk Venstreparti)	2
Total number of members:	19

Leirfjord kommunestyre 2011–2015
Party name (in Norwegian)	Number of representatives
Labour Party (Arbeiderpartiet)	7
Progress Party (Fremskrittspartiet)	3
Red Party (Rødt)	1
Centre Party (Senterpartiet)	6
Socialist Left Party (Sosialistisk Venstreparti)	2
Total number of members:	19

Leirfjord kommunestyre 2007–2011
Party name (in Norwegian)	Number of representatives
Labour Party (Arbeiderpartiet)	8
Progress Party (Fremskrittspartiet)	4
Red Electoral Alliance (Rød Valgallianse)	1
Centre Party (Senterpartiet)	3
Socialist Left Party (Sosialistisk Venstreparti)	2
Leirfjord local list (Leirfjord bygdeliste)	1
Total number of members:	19

Leirfjord kommunestyre 2003–2007
Party name (in Norwegian)	Number of representatives
Labour Party (Arbeiderpartiet)	7
Red Electoral Alliance (Rød Valgallianse)	1
Centre Party (Senterpartiet)	5
Socialist Left Party (Sosialistisk Venstreparti)	3
Leirfjord local list (Leirfjord Bygdeliste)	3
Total number of members:	19

Leirfjord kommunestyre 1999–2003
Party name (in Norwegian)	Number of representatives
Labour Party (Arbeiderpartiet)	7
Centre Party (Senterpartiet)	6
Socialist Left Party (Sosialistisk Venstreparti)	2
Leirfjord local list (Leirfjord bygdeliste)	6
Total number of members:	21

Leirfjord kommunestyre 1995–1999
Party name (in Norwegian)	Number of representatives
Labour Party (Arbeiderpartiet)	6
Red Electoral Alliance (Rød Valgallianse)	1
Centre Party (Senterpartiet)	5
Socialist Left Party (Sosialistisk Venstreparti)	2
Leirfjord local list (Leirfjord Bygdeliste)	7
Total number of members:	21

Leirfjord kommunestyre 1991–1995
Party name (in Norwegian)	Number of representatives
Labour Party (Arbeiderpartiet)	6
Centre Party (Senterpartiet)	5
Socialist Left Party (Sosialistisk Venstreparti)	3
Joint list of the Conservative Party (Høyre), Christian Democratic Party (Kristelig Folkeparti), and Liberal Party (Venstre)	2
Leirfjord local list (Leirfjord bygdeliste)	3
Sundøy common list (Sundøy samlingsliste)	2
Total number of members:	21

Leirfjord kommunestyre 1987–1991
Party name (in Norwegian)	Number of representatives
Labour Party (Arbeiderpartiet)	6
Conservative Party (Høyre)	2
Christian Democratic Party (Kristelig Folkeparti)	1
Centre Party (Senterpartiet)	3
Socialist Left Party (Sosialistisk Venstreparti)	1
Joint list of the Liberal Party and independent voters (Venstre og uavhengige velgere)	1
Leirfjord local list (Leirfjord bygdeliste)	5
Sundøy common list (Sundøy samlingsliste)	2
Total number of members:	21

Leirfjord kommunestyre 1983–1987
Party name (in Norwegian)	Number of representatives
Labour Party (Arbeiderpartiet)	6
Conservative Party (Høyre)	2
Christian Democratic Party (Kristelig Folkeparti)	1
Centre Party (Senterpartiet)	3
Socialist Left Party (Sosialistisk Venstreparti)	1
Joint list of the Liberal Party and independent voters (Venstre og uavhengige velgere)	1
Leirfjord local list (Leirfjord bygdeliste)	6
Sundøy common list (Sundøy samlingsliste)	1
Total number of members:	21

Leirfjord kommunestyre 1979–1983
Party name (in Norwegian)	Number of representatives
Labour Party (Arbeiderpartiet)	5
Conservative Party (Høyre)	2
Christian Democratic Party (Kristelig Folkeparti)	1
Centre Party (Senterpartiet)	4
Free voters (Frie velgere)	1
Leirfjord local list (Leirfjord bygdeliste)	8
Total number of members:	21

Leirfjord kommunestyre 1975–1979
Party name (in Norwegian)	Number of representatives
Labour Party (Arbeiderpartiet)	12
Christian Democratic Party (Kristelig Folkeparti)	1
Centre Party (Senterpartiet)	5
Joint list of the Conservative Party (Høyre) and the Liberal Party (Venstre)	1
Free voters list (Frie velgeres liste)	1
Sundøy area non-party list (Sundøy Krets Upolitiske Liste)	1
Total number of members:	21

Leirfjord kommunestyre 1971–1975
Party name (in Norwegian)	Number of representatives
Labour Party (Arbeiderpartiet)	9
Christian Democratic Party (Kristelig Folkeparti)	1
Centre Party (Senterpartiet)	6
Joint List(s) of Non-Socialist Parties (Borgerlige Felleslister)	3
Local List(s) (Lokale lister)	2
Total number of members:	21

Leirfjord kommunestyre 1967–1971
Party name (in Norwegian)	Number of representatives
Labour Party (Arbeiderpartiet)	9
Centre Party (Senterpartiet)	6
Joint List(s) of Non-Socialist Parties (Borgerlige Felleslister)	3
Local List(s) (Lokale lister)	3
Total number of members:	21

Leirfjord kommunestyre 1963–1967
Party name (in Norwegian)	Number of representatives
Labour Party (Arbeiderpartiet)	9
Centre Party (Senterpartiet)	5
Joint List(s) of Non-Socialist Parties (Borgerlige Felleslister)	5
Local List(s) (Lokale lister)	2
Total number of members:	21

Leirfjord herredsstyre 1959–1963
Party name (in Norwegian)	Number of representatives
Labour Party (Arbeiderpartiet)	8
Centre Party (Senterpartiet)	5
Joint List(s) of Non-Socialist Parties (Borgerlige Felleslister)	3
Local List(s) (Lokale lister)	1
Total number of members:	17

Leirfjord herredsstyre 1955–1959
Party name (in Norwegian)	Number of representatives
Labour Party (Arbeiderpartiet)	7
Local List(s) (Lokale lister)	10
Total number of members:	17

Leirfjord herredsstyre 1951–1955
Party name (in Norwegian)	Number of representatives
Labour Party (Arbeiderpartiet)	6
Local List(s) (Lokale lister)	10
Total number of members:	16

Leirfjord herredsstyre 1947–1951
Party name (in Norwegian)	Number of representatives
Labour Party (Arbeiderpartiet)	6
Local List(s) (Lokale lister)	10
Total number of members:	16

Leirfjord herredsstyre 1945–1947
Party name (in Norwegian)	Number of representatives
Labour Party (Arbeiderpartiet)	6
Local List(s) (Lokale lister)	10
Total number of members:	16

Leirfjord herredsstyre 1937–1941*
Party name (in Norwegian)	Number of representatives
Labour Party (Arbeiderpartiet)	3
Joint List(s) of Non-Socialist Parties (Borgerlige Felleslister)	5
Local List(s) (Lokale lister)	8
Total number of members:	16
Note: Due to the German occupation of Norway during World War II, no elections were held for new municipal councils until after the war ended in 1945.

=== Mayors ===
The mayor (Norwegian: ordfører) of Leirfjord Municipality is the political leader of the municipality and the chairperson of the municipal council. Here is a list of people who have held this position:

- 1915–1920: Jens Johnsen
- 1920–1926: Lars Jaastad
- 1926–1928: S. Kibsgård
- 1928–1931: J.E. Bergh (H)
- 1932–1935: Edvard A. Nilssen
- 1935–1941: Einar Leknes (V)
- 1942–1945: Thoralf Mørk
- 1945–1955: Einar Leknes (V)
- 1955–1957: Birger Jåstad (LL)
- 1957–1959: Kåre Hjartland (Sp)
- 1959–1964: Hans Nersund (Ap)
- 1964–1967: Einar Leknes (V)
- 1967–1971: Trygve Meisfjord (Ap)
- 1971–1975: Arnfinn Jøsevold (Ap)
- 1975–1983: Carl Klæboe (Ap)
- 1983–1987: Arnfinn Jøsevold (LL)
- 1987–1991: Harald Jarle Pedersen (Ap)
- 1991–1995: Åshild Albertsen (Sp)
- 1995–1999: Harald Jarle Pedersen (LL)
- 1999–2003: Oddvar Sjursen (Sp)
- 2003–2011: Ivan Haugland (Ap)
- 2011–2015: Nils Magnar Johnsen (Sp)
- 2015–2023: Ivan Haugland (Ap)
- 2023–present: Sten Rino Bonsaksen (Ap)

== Notable people ==
- Gunvald Ludvigsen (born 1949 in Leirfjord), a Norwegian politician who was Mayor of Eid Municipality from 2003 to 2005
- Roger Johansen (born 1973 in Leirfjord), a Norwegian ice sledge hockey player who competed at the 2010 Winter Paralympics
