= Lørenskog =

Lørenskog Municipality Lørenskog kommune
- Municipality
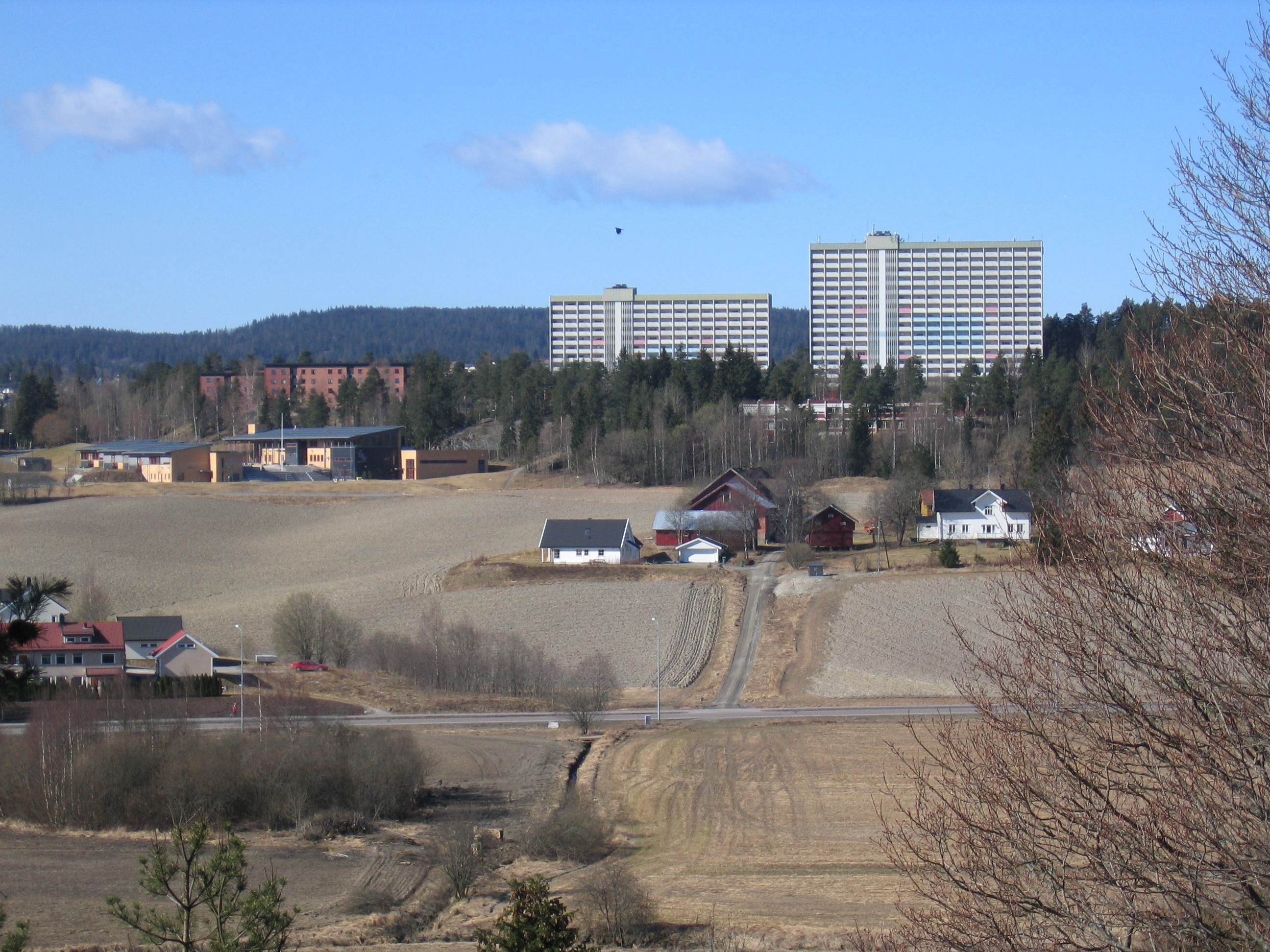

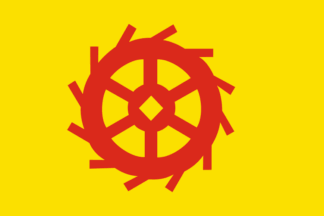
- Flag Coat of arms

- Akershus within Norway

- Lørenskog within Akershus
- Coordinates: 59°53′56″N 10°57′51″E
- Country: Norway
- County: Akershus
- District: Romerike
- Administrative centre: Kjenn

Government
  - Mayor (2023): Amine Mabel Andresen (H)

Area
  - Total: 71 km^{2} (27 sq mi)
  - Land: 67 km^{2} (26 sq mi)
  - Rank: #405 in Norway

Population (2021)
  - Total: 44 693
  - Rank: #22 in Norway
  - Density: 527/km^{2} (1,360/sq mi)
  - Change (10 years): ▲ +16.1%
- Demonym(s): Lørenskoging; Lørnskæving

Official language
  - Norwegian form: Bokmål
- Time zone: UTC+01:00 (CET)
  - Summer (DST): UTC+02:00 (CEST)
- ISO 3166 code: NO-3222
- Website: Official website

Lørenskog is a municipality in Akershus county, Norway. A suburb of Oslo, it is part of the Oslo urban area and the traditional region of Romerike. The administrative centre of the municipality is the village of Lørenskog. Lørenskog was separated from the municipality of Skedsmo on 1 January 1908.

== General information ==
=== Name ===
The municipality (originally the parish) is named after the old (and no longer existent) Leirheimr farm. The first element is leirr which means "clay" and the last element is heimr which means "homestead" or "farm". Thus: "the farm built on clay ground". The suffix skógr (meaning "wood") was added later, changing the meaning to "the woodlands around the farm Leirheimr". Prior to 1918, the name was spelled "Lørenskogen".

=== Heraldry ===
Lørenskog's arms date from modern times. Granted on 26 July 1957, they show a red waterwheel on a gold background. Water-driven sawmills were once an important part of the municipality's economy.

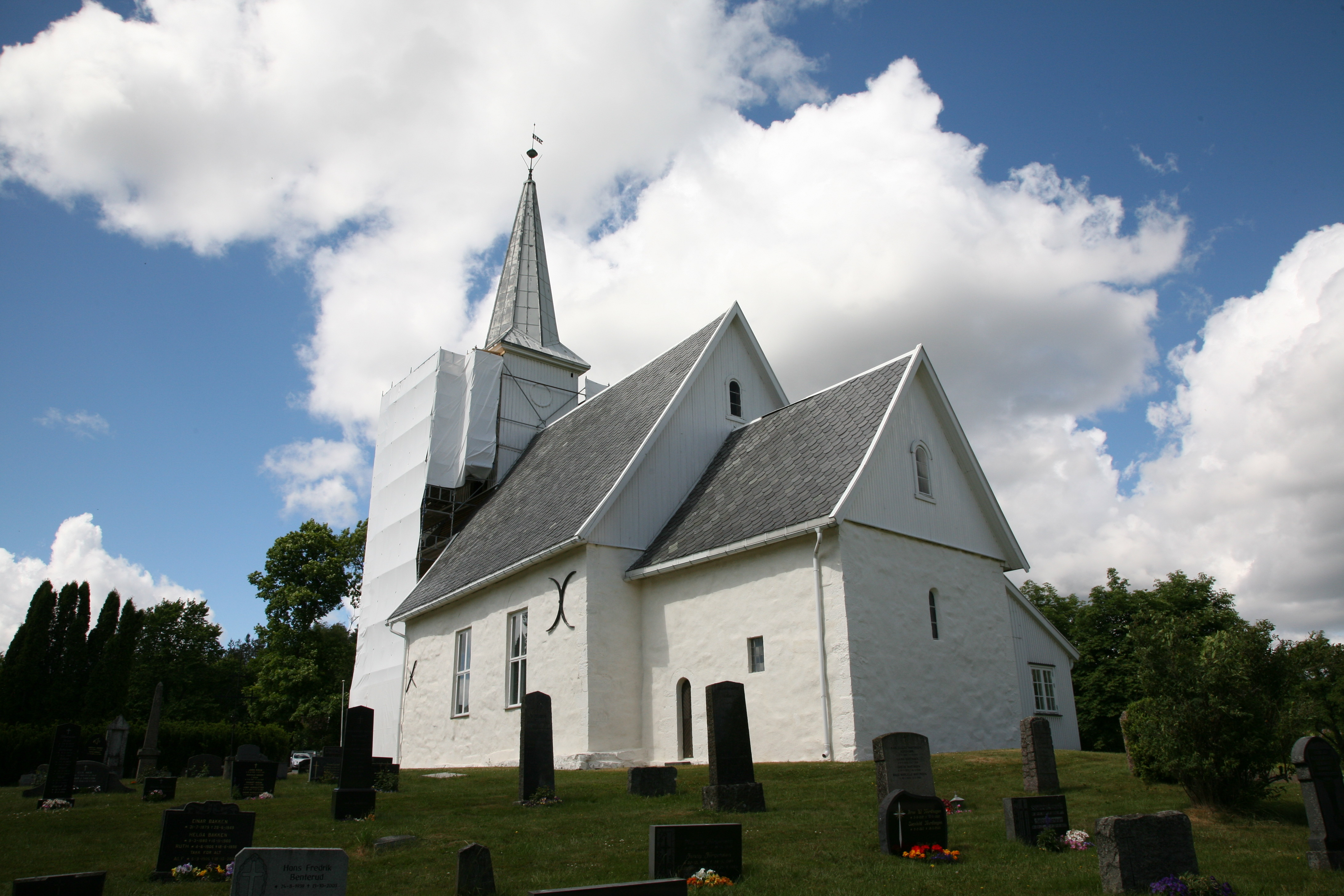
Lørenskog Church

== Lørenskog Church ==
Lørenskog Church (Lørenskog kirke) is a medieval-era church. The building material was brick and quarried limestone. The church dates to ca. 1150. The church is of rectangular plan and has 140 seats. In 1608 the church received a pulpit. The west tower was made of wood and was erected in 1864. In the tower hangs two church bells, the larger made in 1874. Its walls are one meter thick, and the stones are held together with lime mortar. The exterior and interior plaster was repaired during the 1600s and 1700s. In 1956 old plaster was removed and walls re-plastered and painted. The current outward opening door was inserted in 1946.

== Demographics ==
Media said in 2026, that "more than 40%" of the inhabitants are now immigrants.

Historical population
| Year | Pop. | ±% |
|---|---|---|
| 1951 | 7,852 | — |
| 1961 | 11,086 | +41.2% |
| 1971 | 17,236 | +55.5% |
| 1981 | 22,520 | +30.7% |
| 1991 | 26,560 | +17.9% |
| 2001 | 29,656 | +11.7% |
| 2011 | 33,308 | +12.3% |
| 2021 | 42,740 | +28.3% |
Source: Statistics Norway

Number of minorities (1st and 2nd generation) in Lørenskog by country of origin in 2017
| Ancestry | Number |
|---|---|
| Pakistan | 1,359 |
| Poland | 913 |
| Vietnam | 753 |
| Sri Lanka | 744 |
| Iran | 535 |
| Turkey | 390 |
| Lithuania | 362 |
| Sweden | 355 |
| India | 322 |
| Afghanistan | 307 |
| Iraq | 282 |
| Philippines | 255 |

== Geography ==
The municipality is located just east of the capital, Oslo, with many main roads going through it. Almost all the inhabitants live in the northern part of Lørenskog. The southern parts consist of forest, while farms and grain fields occupy the space in between. An important train station, Lørenskog Station, is situated in the district. Within Lørenskog, Losby is known for its waterwheel, which is represented in the municipal coat-of-arms of Lørenskog. Losby Golf and Country Club is located within the municipality.

== Village ==
From 2006 to 2008, workers renovated the village of Lørenskog (the administrative center of the municipality), also called the "Metro Senter". This renovation includes a considerably larger shopping mall, a bus terminal with buses going in and out of Oslo every 15 minutes, possibly a future subway station, and the new Mailand Upper Secondary School.

== Economy ==
The headquarters of Power, a consumer electronics company, are located at Lørenskog.

== Education ==
There are seven public elementary schools and four public high schools located in Kjenn, Hammer, Løkenåsen and Fjellsrud. In addition there are two Upper Secondary Schools, namely Lørenskog Upper Secondary School and Mailand Upper Secondary School.

== Politics and government ==
Lørenskog kommunestyre 2023–2027
| Party name (in Norwegian) | Number of representatives |
|---|---|
| Labour Party (Arbeiderpartiet) | 11 (▼5) |
| Progress Party (Fremskrittspartiet) | 6 (▲1) |
| Green Party (Miljøpartiet De Grønne) | 2 (▼1) |
| Conservative Party (Høyre) | 16 (▲4) |
| The Conservatives (Konservativt) | 1 (▲1) |
| Christian Democratic Party (Kristelig Folkeparti) | 1 ( 0) |
| The Center Party (Partiet Sentrum) | 1 (▲1) |
| Red Party (Rødt) | 1 (▼1) |
| Centre Party (Senterpartiet) | 2 (▼1) |
| Socialist Left Party (Sosialistisk Venstreparti) | 3 ( 0) |
| Liberal Party (Venstre) | 3 (▲1) |
| Total number of members: | 47 |

Since after World War II, Lørenskog has almost always had a mayor from the Labour Party (Ap).
The two exceptions are the period of 1999 — 2003 and the ongoing period from 2023, in which the mayor were and is from the Conservative Party (H).

The current mayor (as of 2023) is Amine Mabel Andresen (H).
The current deputy mayor (as of 2023) is Bjørnar Johannessen (FrP).

== Sports ==
The local handball team Fjellhammer IL has won the Norwegian Cup 3 times during the 1970s and 80s.

== Notable residents ==
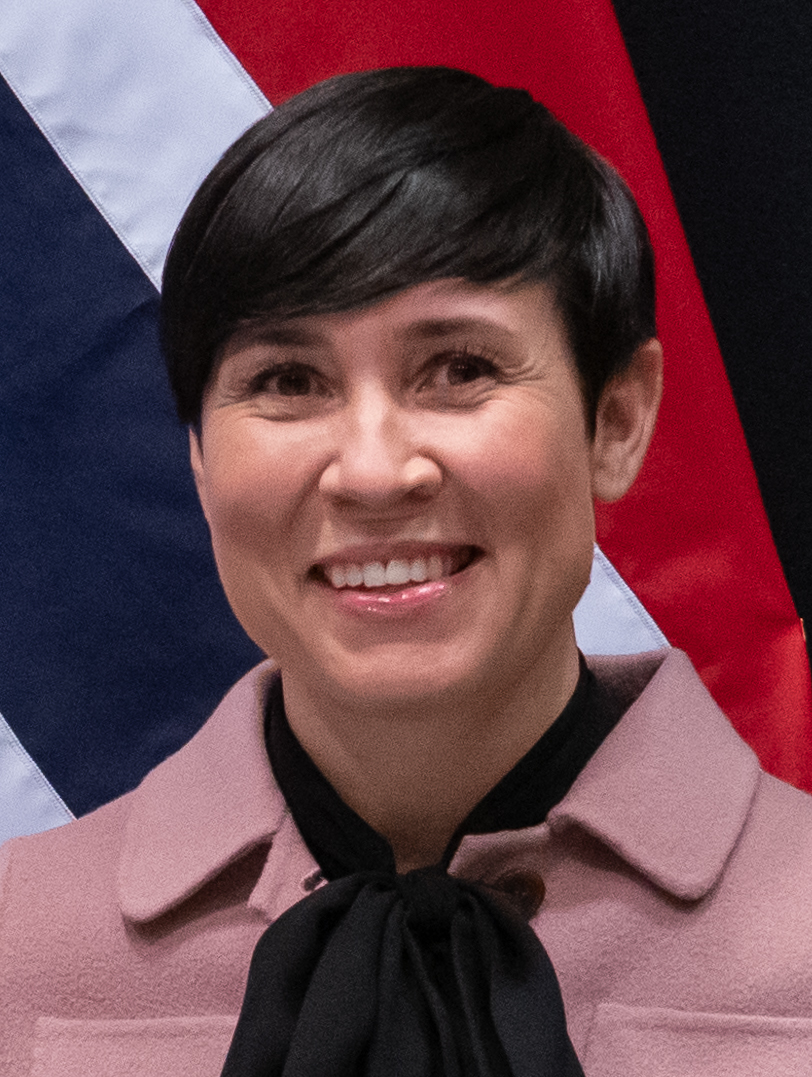
Ine Marie Eriksen Søreide, 2021

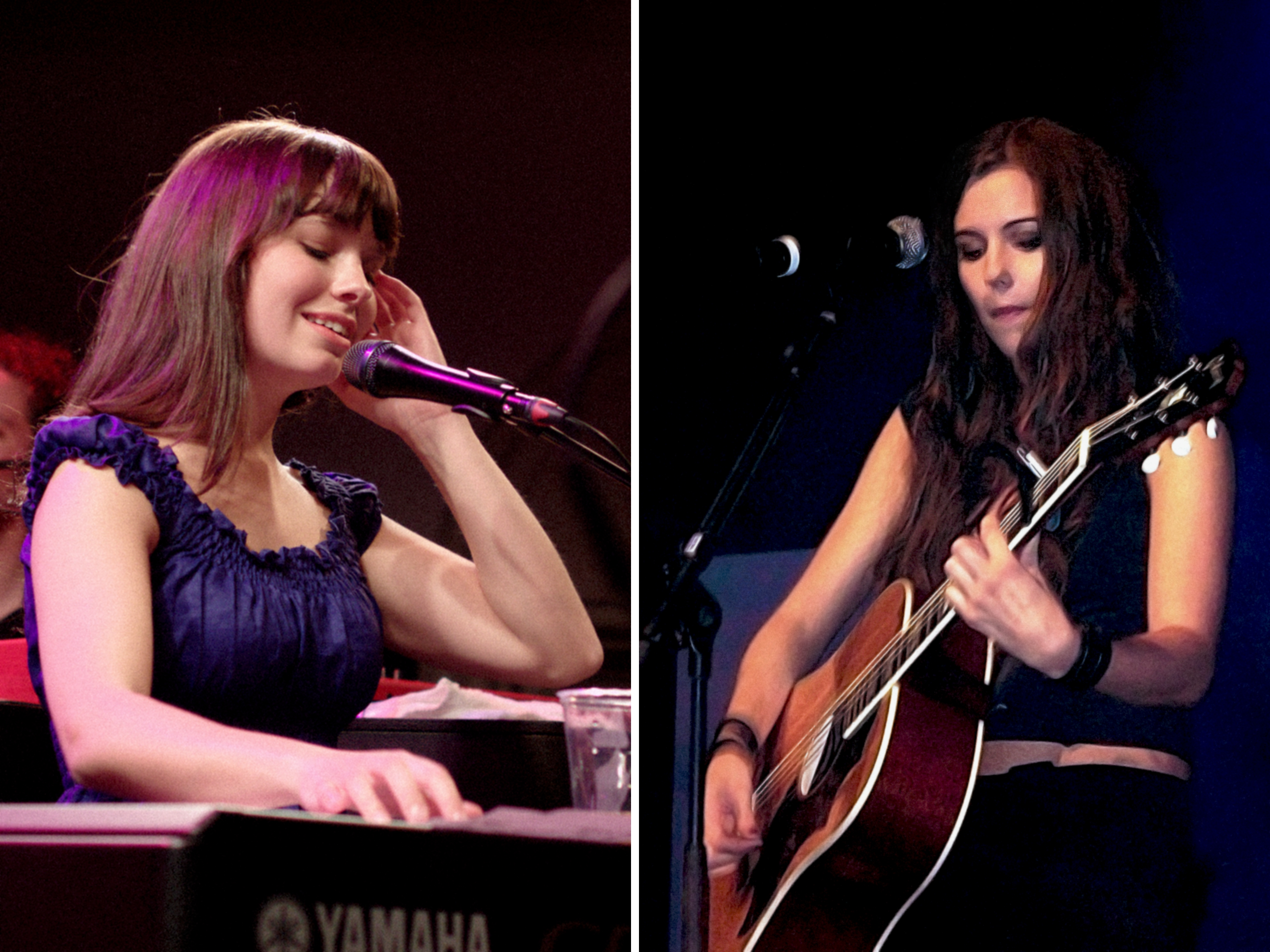
Marit Larsen, 2009 and Marion Raven, 2007, M2M

- Aslam Ahsan (born 1942), a Pakistani Norwegian politician, elected to Lørenskog municipal council in 1983
- Trond Granlund (born 1950), rock and folk singer and composer; lives in Lørenskog
- Torgrim Sørnes (born 1956), physician, historian and author; lives in Lørenskog
- Frode Barth (born 1968 in Lørenskog), a Norwegian musician (guitar) and composer
- Marianne Aulie (born 1971 in Lørenskog), a Norwegian painter and former model
- Lise Myhre (born 1975 in Lørenskog), a Norwegian cartoonist
- Marianne Beate Kielland (born 1975 in Lørenskog), a Norwegian mezzo-soprano
- Ine Marie Eriksen Søreide (born 1976 in Lørenskog), politician, Minister of Defence (Norway) 2013/2017
- Ida S. Skjelbakken (born 1979 in Lørenskog), an author, illustrator and bodyguard
- Marit Larsen (born 1983 in Lørenskog) & Marion Raven (born 1984 in Lørenskog), singer/songwriters with the pop duo M2M
- Elisabeth Carew (born 1985 in Lørenskog), a Norwegian singer and songwriter
- Kirby Ann Basken (born 1985 in Lørenskog), a Norwegian model, Miss Norway Universe 2007
- Kaja Norum (born 1989 in Lørenskog), a Norwegian model and figurativist painter
- Tom Hagen (born 1950), billionaire businessman, whose wife Anne-Elizabeth Hagen disappeared mysteriously in 2018, dramatised for television as The Lørenskog Disappearance

=== Sport ===
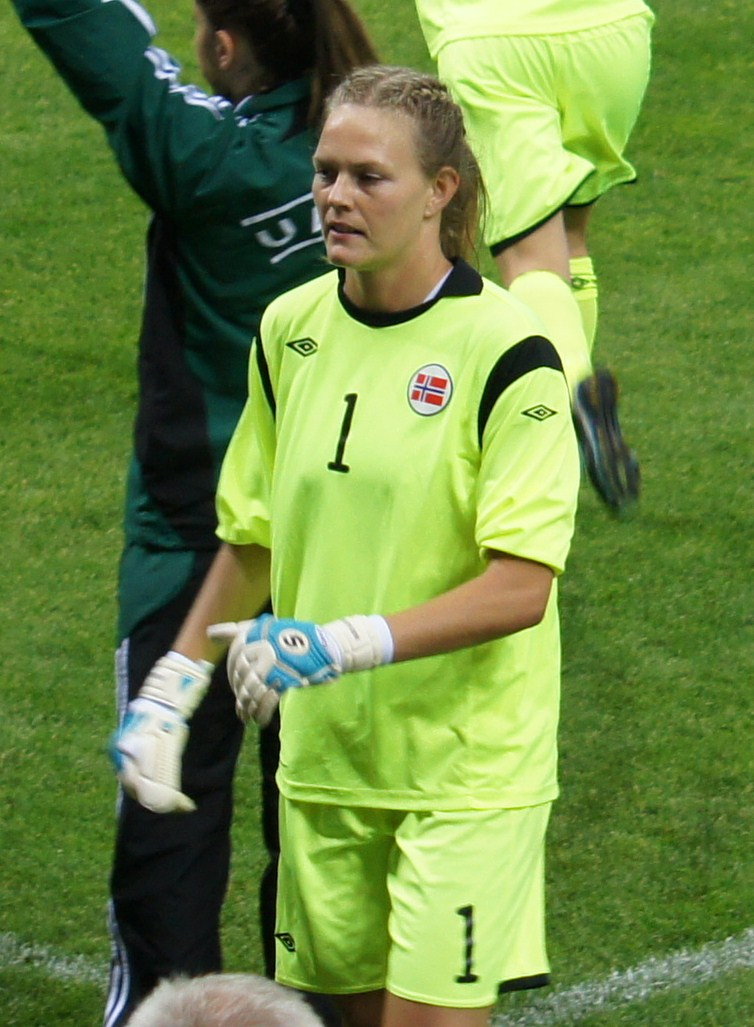
Ingrid Hjelmseth, 2013

- Kjetil Siem (born 1960), journalist, author and sports official; Secretary-general of the Football Association of Norway, lives in Lørenskog
- Schirin Zorriassateiny (born 1964 in Lørenskog), a Norwegian rhythmic gymnast
- Trine Hattestad (born 1966 in Lørenskog), a retired javelin thrower, bronze and gold medallist at the 1996 & 2000 Summer Olympics
- Hege Riise (born 1969 in Lørenskog), a football coach and former player with 188 caps for Norway
- Pål Grotnes (1977 in Lørenskog), a professional ice hockey goaltender
- John Carew (born 1979 in Lørenskog), former footballer with 365 club caps and 91 for Norway
- Ingrid Hjelmseth (born 1980 in Lørenskog), a former football goalkeeper with 361 club caps and 138 for Norway women
- Aksel Lund Svindal (born 1982 in Lørenskog), a former World Cup and Olympic medallist alpine ski racer
- Siren Sundby (born 1982 in Lørenskog), sailor, gold medallist at the 2004 Summer Olympics
- Christina Vukicevic (born 1987), a Norwegian former hurdler
- Cecilie Fiskerstrand (born 1996), a footballer for Norway

== Twin towns – sister cities ==
Lørenskog is twinned with:

- Garching bei München, Germany
- Järvenpää, Finland
- Rødovre, Denmark
- Täby, Sweden
