= Skogmo (disambiguation) =

Skogmo may refer to:

- Skogmo
- Skogmo Chapel
- Skogmo (surname)
