= Solstad Church =

Church in Nordland, Norway

- Solstad kirke
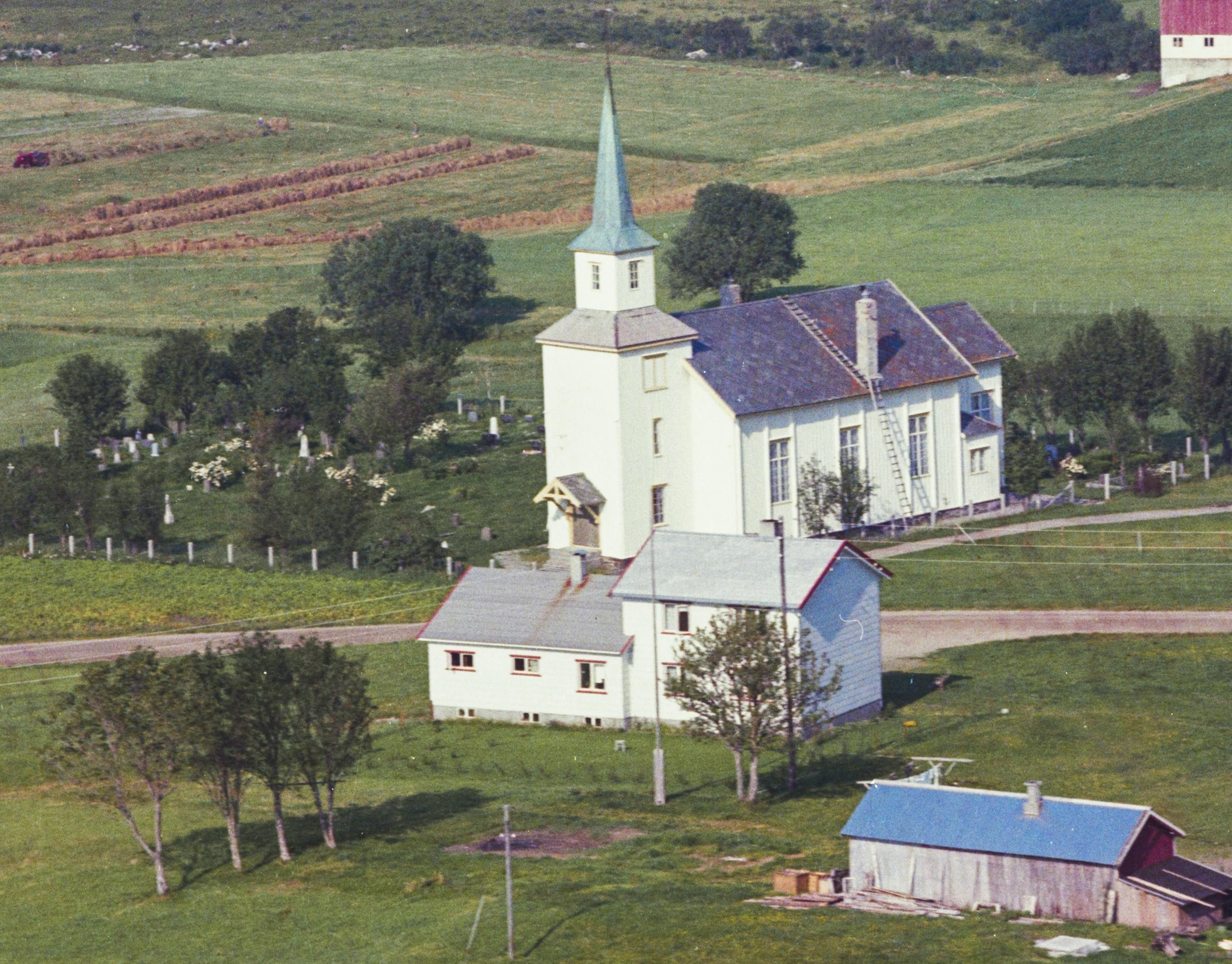
- View of the church
- Solstad Church
- 65.1842859°N 12.1233218°E
- Location: Bindal Municipality, Nordland
- Country: Norway
- Denomination: Church of Norway
- Churchmanship: Evangelical Lutheran

History
- Status: Parish church
- Founded: 14th century
- Consecrated: 1888

Architecture
- Functional status: Active
- Architect: Ole Scheistrøen
- Architectural type: Long church
- Completed: 1888 (138 years ago)

Specifications
- Capacity: 300
- Materials: Wood

Administration
- Diocese: Sør-Hålogaland
- Deanery: Sør-Helgeland prosti
- Parish: Bindal
- Norwegian Cultural Heritage Site
- Type: Church
- Status: Not protected
- ID: 85519

Solstad Church (Norwegian: Solstad kirke) is a parish church of the Church of Norway in Bindal Municipality in Nordland county, Norway. It is located along the Bindalsfjorden in the village of Holm. It is one of the two churches for the Bindal parish which is part of the Sør-Helgeland prosti (deanery) in the Diocese of Sør-Hålogaland. The white, wooden church was built in a long church style in 1888 using plans drawn up by the architect Ole Scheistrøen. The church seats about 300 people.

== History ==
The earliest existing historical records of the church date back to the year 1641, but the church was likely built long before that time. The first church at Solstad was built about 1.5 kilometres (0.93 mi) to the northeast of the present church site in Holm. This old stave church was torn down in 1643 and replaced with a new church on the same site. Historically, this had been an annex chapel under the main Sømna Church on the other side of the fjord. Written records from 1652 state that the church had a rectangular nave and narrower, rectangular chancel, with a transept to the north or south and an entry porch for the main entrance. By 1666, the church was already described as being in poor condition. In 1734, the old, dilapidated building was torn down and replaced with a new church on the same site. The new building was a long church with an entry porch on the west end and a choir on the east end that also had a sacristy on the north side of it. As early as the 1760s, several repairs were carried out on the building. In 1888, a new church was built about 1.5 kilometres (0.93 mi) to the southwest of the old church site. The new church was a long church design as well. After the new church was completed, the old church was disassembled and moved to the village of Lande in neighboring Brønnøy Municipality where it stands today as Tosen Chapel.

== See also ==
- List of churches in Sør-Hålogaland
