= Trælnes =

Village in Brønnøy Municipality, Norway

- Village
- Interactive map of Trælnes
- Location within Nordland Location within Norway
- Coordinates: 65.3879°N 12.1776°E
- Country: Norway
- Region: Northern Norway
- County: Nordland
- District: Helgeland
- Municipality: Brønnøy Municipality
- Elevation: 11 m (36 ft)
- Time zone: UTC+01:00 (CET)
  - Summer (DST): UTC+02:00 (CEST)
- Post Code: 8900 Brønnøysund

Trælnes is a village in Brønnøy Municipality in Nordland county, Norway. The village is located along the Norwegian County Road 17 and along the Torgfjorden, just north of the village of Berg (in neighboring Sømna Municipality) and east of the mountain Torghatten. The Trælnes Chapel is located in this village.
