= Brønnøysund Bridge =

Brønnøysund Bridge Brønnøysund bru
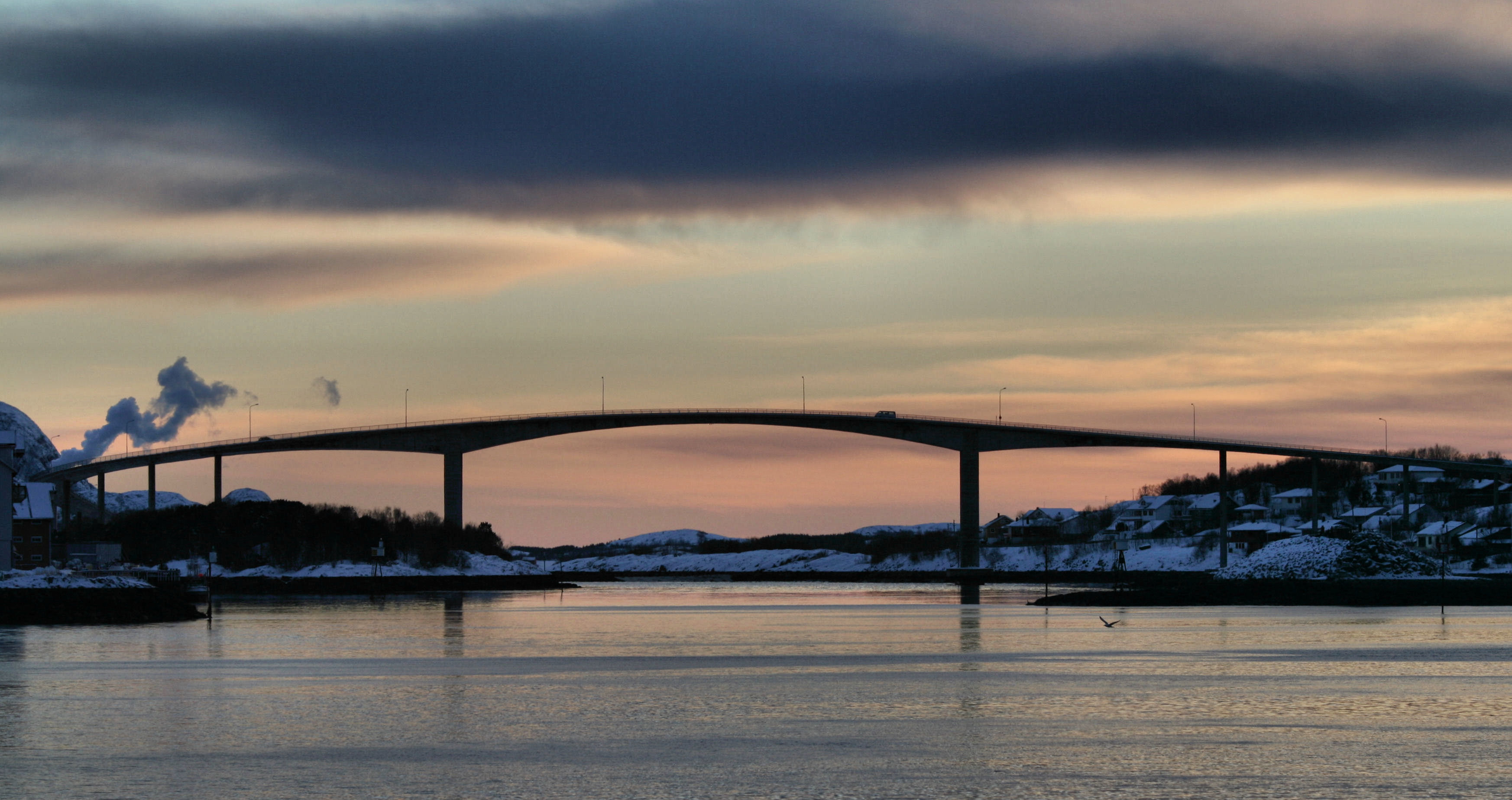
- View of the bridge
- Coordinates: 65°27′55″N 12°11′21″E
- Carries: Fv54
- Crosses: Brønnøysundet strait
- Locale: Brønnøy Municipality, Norway

Characteristics
- Total length: 550 metres (1,800 ft)
- Longest span: 110 metres (360 ft)
- Clearance below: 30 metres (98 ft)

History
- Opened: 1979

The Brønnøysund Bridge (Norwegian: Brønnøysund bru) is a cantilevered road bridge near the town of Brønnøysund in Brønnøy Municipality in Nordland county, Norway. The bridge was constructed in 1979 and it connects the small island of Torget with the mainland just south of Brønnøysund. The 550-metre-long (1,800 ft) bridge has a maximum clearance to the sea of 30 metres (98 ft). It consists of 20 spans, the longest of which is 110 metres (360 ft). The bridge deck is made of pre-stressed concrete.

The island of Torget is well known for the mountain Torghatten, which has a hole, or natural tunnel, straight through it.

== See also ==
- List of bridges in Norway
- List of bridges in Norway by length
