= Sausvatnet =

Lake in Brønnøy, Norway

- Interactive map of the lake
- Location: Brønnøy Municipality, Nordland
- Coordinates: 65.3450°N 12.6578°E
- Basin countries: Norway
- Max. length: 8.5 kilometres (5.3 mi)
- Max. width: 1 kilometre (0.62 mi)
- Surface area: 4.84 km^{2} (1.87 sq mi)
- Shore length^{1}: 21.32 kilometres (13.25 mi)
- Surface elevation: 15 metres (49 ft)
- References: NVE
- ^{1} Shore length is not a well-defined measure.

Sausvatnet is a lake that is located in Brønnøy Municipality in Nordland county, Norway. There is also a small village on the eastern shore called Sausvatn. The lake is located about 7 kilometres (4.3 mi) south of the village of Hommelstø and about 15 kilometres (9.3 mi) northwest of the village of Lande.

== See also ==
- List of lakes in Norway
- Geography of Norway
