= Tosen Chapel =

Church in Nordland, Norway

- Tosen kapell / Lande kapell
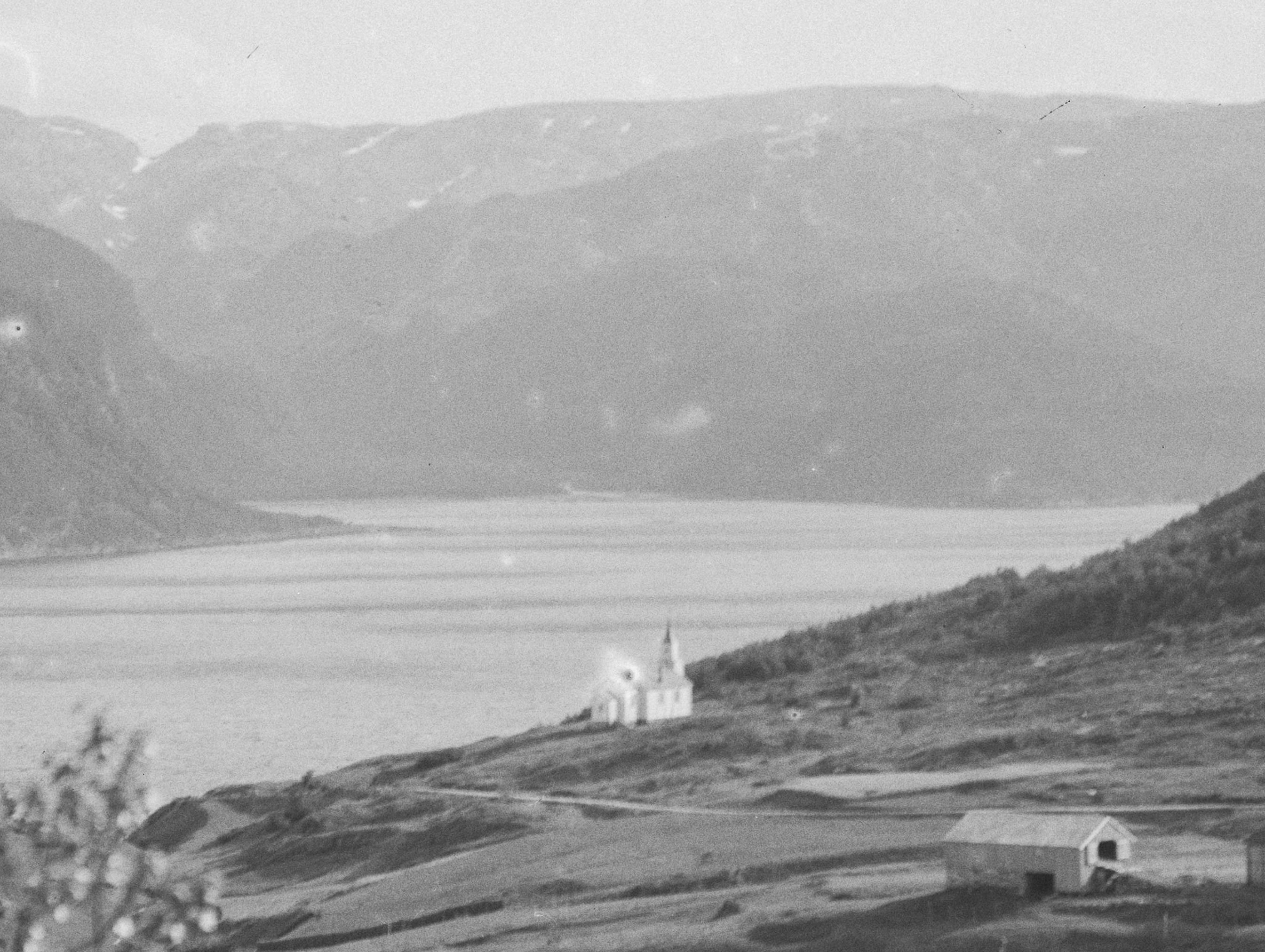
- View of the chapel
- Tosen Chapel
- 65.2539005°N 12.78924599°E
- Location: Brønnøy Municipality, Nordland
- Country: Norway
- Denomination: Church of Norway
- Churchmanship: Evangelical Lutheran

History
- Status: Parish church
- Founded: 1888
- Consecrated: 1888
- Events: Moved to Lande in 1888

Architecture
- Functional status: Active
- Architectural type: Long church
- Completed: 1888 (138 years ago)

Specifications
- Capacity: 80
- Materials: Wooden

Administration
- Diocese: Sør-Hålogaland
- Deanery: Sør-Helgeland prosti
- Parish: Velfjord og Tosen
- Norwegian Cultural Heritage Site
- Type: Church
- Status: Listed
- ID: 85657

Tosen Chapel or Lande Chapel (Norwegian: Tosen kapell / Lande kapell) is a parish church of the Church of Norway in Brønnøy Municipality in Nordland county, Norway. It is located in the village of Lande. It is one of the churches for the Velfjord og Tosen parish which is part of the Sør-Helgeland prosti (deanery) in the Diocese of Sør-Hålogaland. The white, wooden church was built in a long church style in 1888. The church seats about 80 people.

== History ==
The church was originally constructed in 1734 at Solstad (near Holm) in Bindal Municipality and it was known then as Solstad Church. The building was disassembled and moved here in 1888 when it was renamed as Tosen Chapel.

== See also ==
- List of churches in Sør-Hålogaland
