= S-form =

Adding "s" to business names verbally, like "Safeway's" for Safeway

For the geological erosional feature, see P-form (geology)

The s-form is the English language phenomenon of suffixing -'s or -s to business names where there is not one present in writing, predominantly in colloquial speech. This is particularly common with the names of supermarkets. For example Tesco could be converted to Tesco's in speech, Safeway to Safeways, Walmart to Walmart's, etc.

Foreigners come across this form especially as concerns manufacturers; mere retailers like the above examples remain customers' and employees' conversation. For example, the firm Short Brothers (of Belfast) built the aircraft called the Short Sunderland, but the firm is colloquially given as Shorts.

== Causes ==
It is most likely that the s-form is an overgeneralisation of the possessive suffix common in business names.
