= Skomo =

Village in Brønnøy Municipality, Norway

- Village
- Interactive map of Skomo
- Location within Nordland Location within Norway
- Coordinates: 65.4763°N 12.3649°E
- Country: Norway
- Region: Northern Norway
- County: Nordland
- District: Helgeland
- Municipality: Brønnøy Municipality
- Elevation: 14 m (46 ft)
- Time zone: UTC+01:00 (CET)
  - Summer (DST): UTC+02:00 (CEST)
- Post Code: 8900 Brønnøysund

Skomo is a village in Brønnøy Municipality in Nordland county, Norway. The village is located along the Norwegian County Road 17, near the end of the Skillbotnfjorden, about 10 kilometres (6.2 mi) east of the town of Brønnøysund. The Skogmo Chapel is located in this village.
