= Torget, Nordland =

Island in Nordland, Norway

Torget
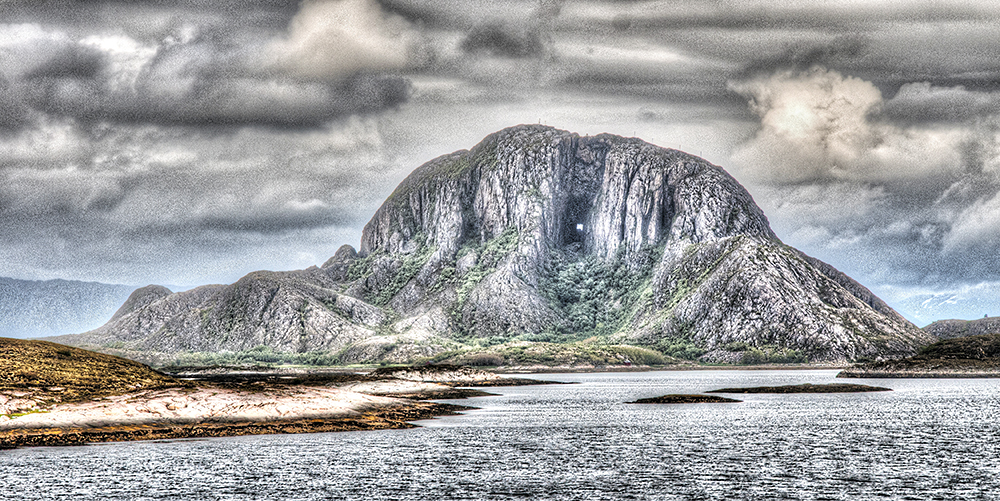
- Interactive map of Torget

Geography
- Location: Nordland, Norway
- Coordinates: 65.4259°N 12.1018°E
- Area: 16.4 km^{2} (6.3 sq mi)
- Length: 11 km (6.8 mi)
- Width: 3.5 km (2.17 mi)
- Highest elevation: 258 m (846 ft)
- Highest point: Torghatten

Administration
- Norway
- County: Nordland
- Municipality: Brønnøy Municipality

Demographics
- Population: 815 (2015)

Torget is an island in Brønnøy Municipality in Nordland county, Norway. The 16.4-square-kilometre (6.3 sq mi) island lies just off shore from the town of Brønnøysund on the mainland. It is connected to Brønnøysund by the Brønnøysund Bridge. There were 815 residents living on the island in 2015.

== Torghatten ==
The unique 258-metre (846 ft) tall mountain Torghatten is the highest point on the island, located on the southern tip of the island. The mountain has a hole through the middle, so Torghatten is a popular tourist destination. It is estimated that there are on average about 100,000 visitors each year. Near Torghatten, there is a campsite where tourists can rent cabins or rent space for camping. There is also a small swimming area and a small restaurant right on the water. Previously, there was a restaurant further away from the bathing area that was severely damaged in a storm. Many tourists from, among others, Norway and Germany come to Torget to hike the mountain and see the hole going through it. This hole, which is 160 metres (520 ft) long, 35 metres (115 ft) high, and 20 metres (66 ft) wide, was created during the ice age. The walk up to the hole takes place on a well-built path and takes about 20 minutes. If you go up one side, down the other side and around Torghatten it takes about 1 hour. Ice and water dug in the loose rocks painfully, while the harder rocks in the top of the mountain remained.

== See also ==
- List of islands of Norway
