= Brønnøy Municipality =

Municipality in Nordland, Norway

Brønnøy Municipality Brønnøy kommune Brïenne
- Municipality
- Brønnø herred (historic name)
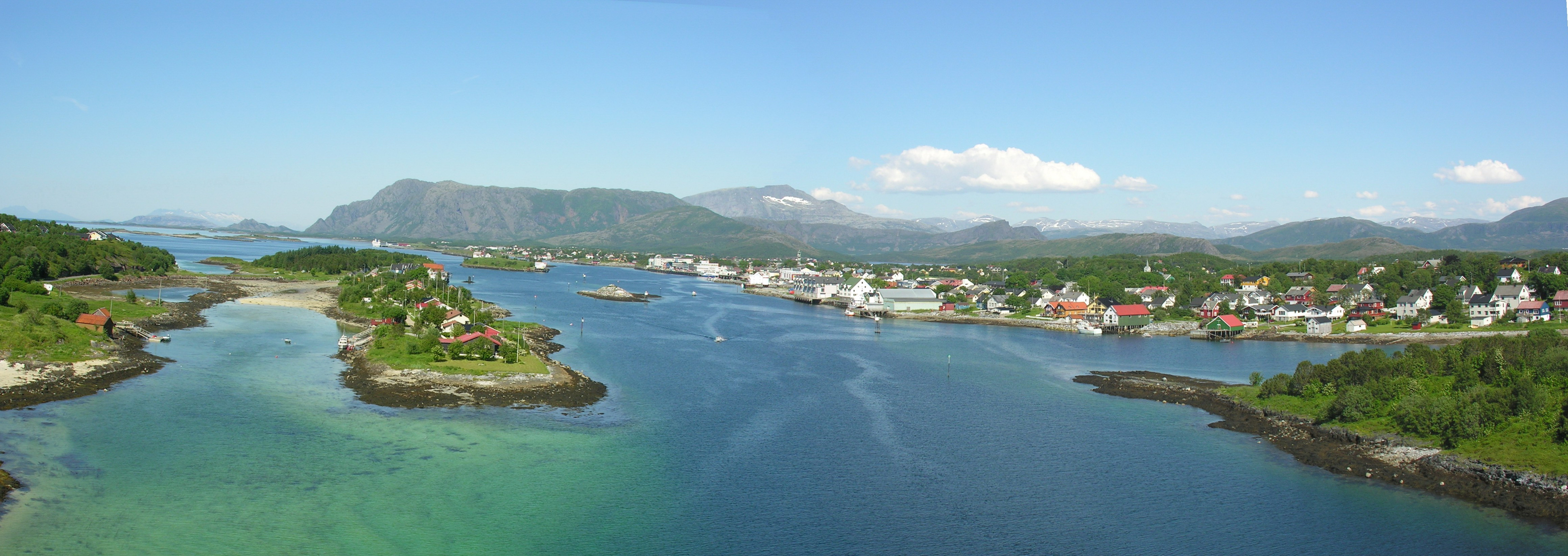
- View of Brønnøysund

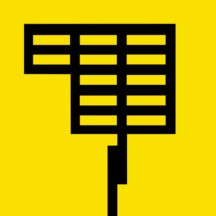
- Flag Coat of arms

- Nordland within Norway

- Brønnøy within Nordland
- Coordinates: 65°28′33″N 12°24′01″E
- Country: Norway
- County: Nordland
- District: Helgeland
- Established: 1 Jan 1838
  - Created as: Formannskapsdistrikt
- Administrative centre: Brønnøysund

Government
  - Mayor (2023): Siv Aglen (Ap)

Area
  - Total: 1,046.03 km^{2} (403.87 sq mi)
  - Land: 998.89 km^{2} (385.67 sq mi)
  - Water: 47.14 km^{2} (18.20 sq mi) 4.5%
  - Rank: #107 in Norway
- Highest elevation: 1,224.86 m (4,018.6 ft)

Population (2024)
  - Total: 7,826
  - Rank: #135 in Norway
  - Density: 7.5/km^{2} (19/sq mi)
  - Change (10 years): ▼ −0.9%
- Demonym: Brønnøyværing

Official language
  - Norwegian form: Neutral
- Time zone: UTC+01:00 (CET)
  - Summer (DST): UTC+02:00 (CEST)
- ISO 3166 code: NO-1813
- Website: Official website

Brønnøy is a municipality in Nordland county, Norway. It is part of the Helgeland region. The administrative centre and commercial centre of the municipality is the town of Brønnøysund. A secondary centre is the village of Hommelstø. Other villages include Tosbotnet, Lande, Trælnes, and Skomo.

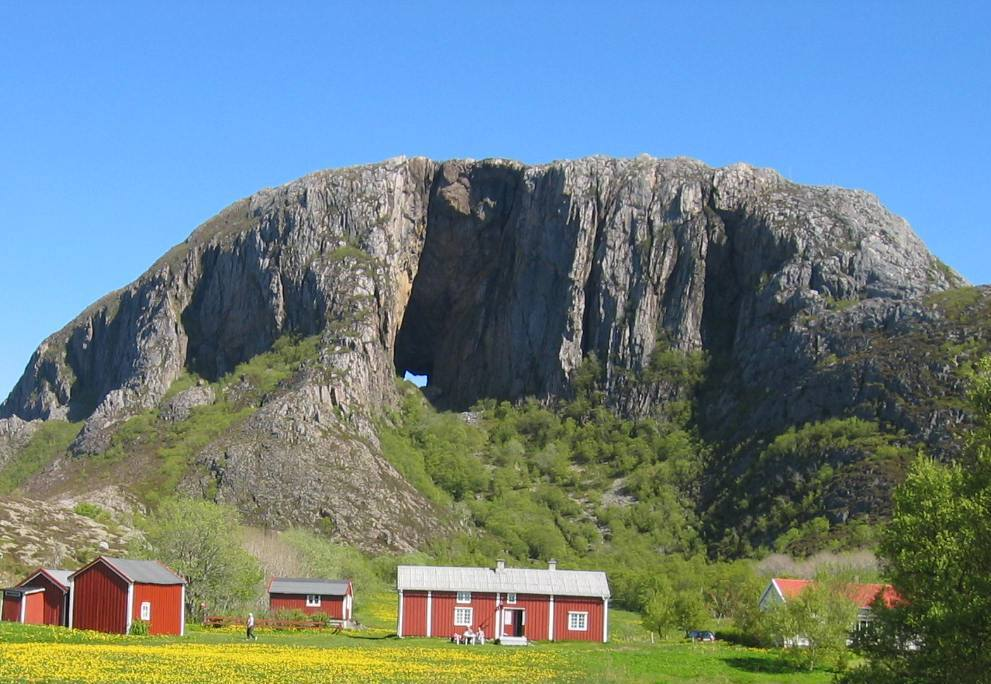
Torghatten seen from the south

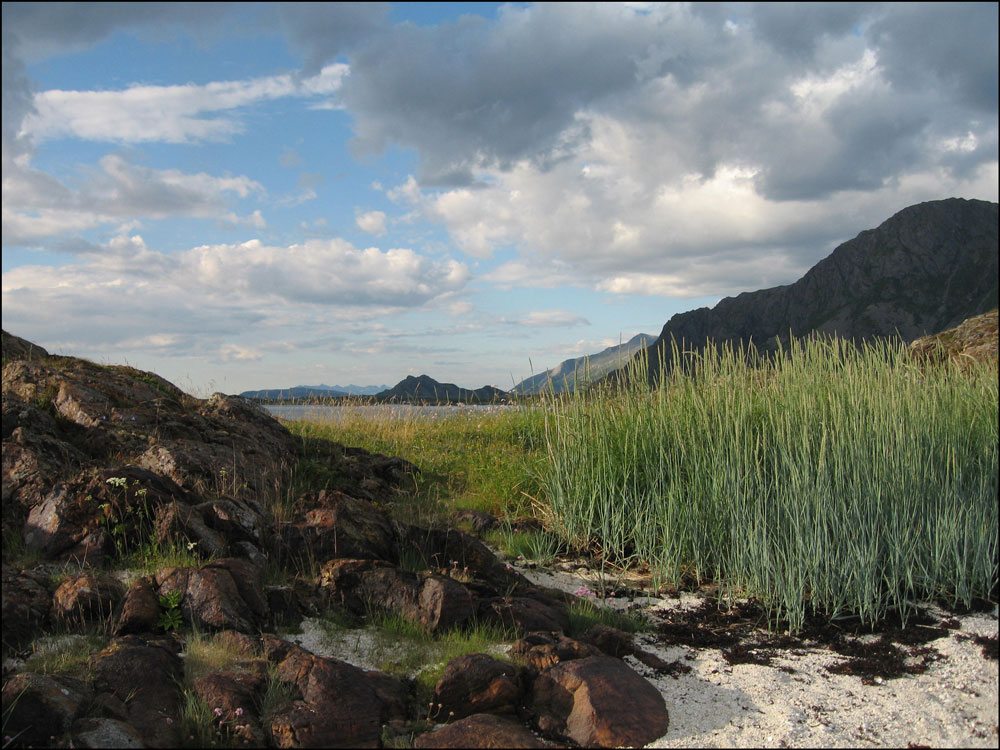
Bjørnholmene

The 1,046-square-kilometre (404 sq mi) municipality is the 107th largest by area out of the 357 municipalities in Norway. Brønnøy Municipality is the 135th most populous municipality in Norway with a population of 7,826. The municipality's population density is 7.5 inhabitants per square kilometre (19/sq mi) and its population has decreased by 0.9% over the previous 10-year period.

The Brønnøysund Register Centre is an important employer in Brønnøy. Also, one of the largest limestone mines in Northern Europe is located in the municipality. Brønnøysund Airport, Brønnøy is located near the town of Brønnøysund.

== General information ==
The municipality of Brønnøy was established on 1 January 1838 (see formannskapsdistrikt law). On 1 October 1875 the eastern district (population: 1,162) was separated to become the new Velfjord Municipality. This left Brønnøy with 4,156 residents.

Then on 1 January 1901, the southwestern district (population: 2,731) was separated to become the new Vik Municipality (which later changed its name to Sømna Municipality). Brønnøy Municipality was then left with 3,440 inhabitants. On 1 January 1923, the large village of Brønnøysund (population: 948) was separated from Brønnøy Municipality to become a town (ladested).

During the 1960s, there were many municipal mergers across Norway due to the work of the Schei Committee. On 1 January 1964, a major municipal merger took place. The following areas were merged to form a new, larger Brønnøy Municipality.

- the town of Brønnøysund (population: 2,064)
- Sømna Municipality (population: 2,347)
- Brønnøy Municipality (population: 2,635)
- Velfjord Municipality (population: 1,380)
- the part of Bindal Municipality located in the Lande-Tosbotn area around the inner Bindalsfjorden (population: 296)

Just thirteen years later on 1 January 1977, most of the former Sømna Municipality was separated from Brønnøy Municipality once again to become its own municipality. The Hongset area of the old Sømna Municipality remained in Brønnøy Municipality. One of Norway's four large ferry shipping companies, Torghatten is based in Brønnøysund, along with its parents company Nordic Ferry Infrastructure.

=== Name ===
The municipality (originally the parish) is named after the small island of Brønnøya (Old Norse: Brunnøy), since the first Brønnøy Church was built there. The first element is brunnr which means "well" or "spring" and the last element is øy which means "island". Islands with freshwater wells were important for seafarers. Historically, the name of the municipality was spelled Brønnø. On 6 January 1908, a royal resolution changed the spelling of the name of the municipality to Brønnøy.

=== Coat of arms ===
The coat of arms was granted on 20 May 1988. The official blazon is "Or a balisage signal sable" (Norwegian: I gull en svart seilingsgrind). This means the arms have a field (background) that has a tincture of Or which means it is commonly colored yellow, but if it is made out of metal, then gold is used. The charge is a navigational marker which is used to signal directions for navigation within a harbour. The charge represents the importance of boating and harbours in this seaside municipality. The arms were designed by Rolf Tidemann, a graphic artist from Brønnøysund.

=== Churches ===
The Church of Norway has two parishes (sokn) within Brønnøy Municipality. It is part of the Sør-Helgeland prosti (deanery) in the Diocese of Sør-Hålogaland.

Churches in Brønnøy Municipality
| Parish (sokn) | Church name | Location of the church | Year built |
|---|---|---|---|
| Brønnøy | Brønnøy Church | Brønnøysund | 1870 |
| Brønnøy | Skogmo Chapel | Skomo | 1979 |
| Brønnøy | Trælnes Chapel | Trælnes | 1980 |
| Velfjord og Tosen | Nøstvik Church | Hommelstø | 1674 |
| Velfjord og Tosen | Tosen Chapel | Lande | 1734 |

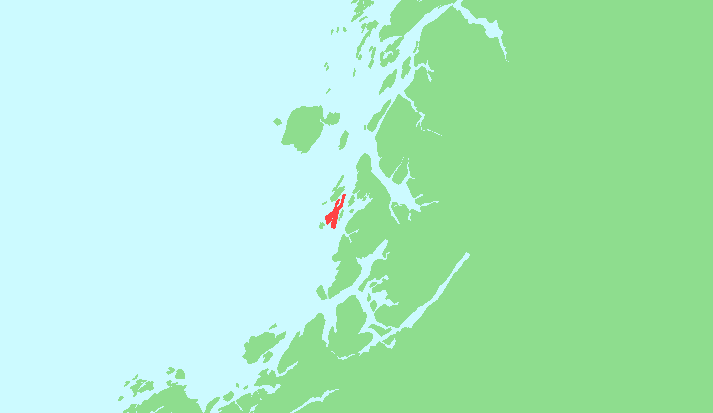
Torget island. The larger, round island northwest of Torget is the main island of the Vega archipelago.

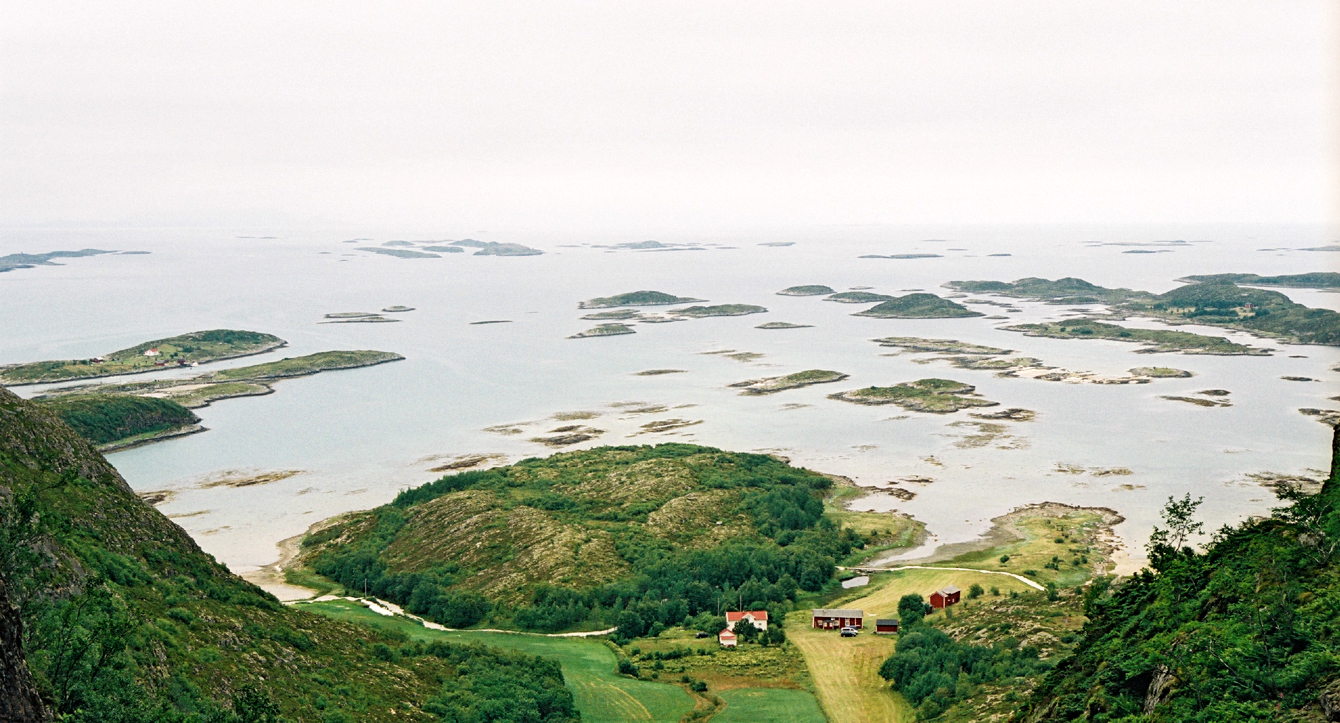
View from inside the hole of Torghatten; the Strandflaten coastal lowland

=== Dialect ===
The Brønnøy dialect is the local dialect of Brønnøy, belonging to the South Helgelandish branch.

== Geography ==
The municipality has great scenic variety with numerous islets, lakes (such as Eidvatnet, Sausvatnet, and Fjellvatnet), mountains, and some fertile agricultural areas. Torget island is connected to the mainland via the Brønnøysund Bridge. The highest point in the municipality is the 1,224.86-metre (4,018.6 ft) tall mountain Breivasstinden, on the border with Grane Municipality.

Brønnøy is located along the Norwegian coast. Vega Municipality and Vevelstad Municipality are to the north, Vefsn Municipality and Grane Municipality are to the east, and Bindal Municipality and Sømna Municipality are to the south. The large fjord Velfjorden runs into the heart of the municipality.

=== Nature ===
In the southwest is the island of Torget, with the mountain Torghatten, is famous for a cavity that goes straight through the structure. Lomsdal–Visten National Park is located in the northeastern part of Brønnøy Municipality.

The world's most northerly naturally occurring small-leaved lime (linden) forests grows in Brønnøy Municipality, and there are patches of boreal rainforests in Grønlidalen nature reserve and Storhaugen nature reserve. Strompdalen nature reserve and Horsvær nature reserve, a nesting place for a rich variety of seabirds, are also located in the municipality.

=== Climate ===
Brønnøy has a temperate oceanic climate with mild winters with all monthly mean temperatures above freezing (Köppen climate classification: Cfb). The growing season is also long for the latitude. There is a lot of precipitation, with significant precipitation in all months. Autumn and early winter is the wettest season and October the wettest month. The driest season is spring and early summer with May as the driest month. There have been weather stations in Brønnøy since 1873. 9 of the 12 monthly all-time lows are from 1940 or older; 3 from before 1900. The all-time low −18.4 °C (−1.1 °F) was recorded in February 1966, and the all-time high 32.5 °C (90.5 °F) was set on 22 July 2025. Inland areas of the municipality will have colder winters.

Climate data for Brønnøysund Airport 1991-2020 (9 m, precipitation 1961-90, extremes 1873-2025 includes earlier stations)
| Month | Jan | Feb | Mar | Apr | May | Jun | Jul | Aug | Sep | Oct | Nov | Dec | Year |
|---|---|---|---|---|---|---|---|---|---|---|---|---|---|
| Record high °C (°F) | 10.2 (50.4) | 11.4 (52.5) | 14.7 (58.5) | 21.1 (70.0) | 27.2 (81.0) | 30.3 (86.5) | 32.5 (90.5) | 30.1 (86.2) | 24.6 (76.3) | 20.3 (68.5) | 17.6 (63.7) | 12.2 (54.0) | 32.5 (90.5) |
| Mean daily maximum °C (°F) | 2 (36) | 2 (36) | 4 (39) | 8 (46) | 12 (54) | 15 (59) | 18 (64) | 17 (63) | 14 (57) | 9 (48) | 6 (43) | 4 (39) | 9 (49) |
| Daily mean °C (°F) | 1.1 (34.0) | 0.4 (32.7) | 1.4 (34.5) | 4.7 (40.5) | 8.1 (46.6) | 11.2 (52.2) | 14.3 (57.7) | 14 (57) | 11.1 (52.0) | 6.8 (44.2) | 4 (39) | 1.9 (35.4) | 6.6 (43.8) |
| Mean daily minimum °C (°F) | 0 (32) | −1 (30) | −1 (30) | 2 (36) | 5 (41) | 9 (48) | 12 (54) | 12 (54) | 9 (48) | 5 (41) | 2 (36) | 1 (34) | 5 (40) |
| Record low °C (°F) | −17.1 (1.2) | −18.4 (−1.1) | −15.5 (4.1) | −10.1 (13.8) | −5 (23) | 0 (32) | 1 (34) | 1.1 (34.0) | −4.4 (24.1) | −5.2 (22.6) | −11.3 (11.7) | −18.2 (−0.8) | −18.4 (−1.1) |
| Average precipitation mm (inches) | 138 (5.4) | 102 (4.0) | 114 (4.5) | 97 (3.8) | 66 (2.6) | 83 (3.3) | 123 (4.8) | 113 (4.4) | 180 (7.1) | 192 (7.6) | 145 (5.7) | 157 (6.2) | 1,510 (59.4) |
Source 1: yr.no - Meteorologisk Institutt
Source 2: Weatheronline.co.uk

== Government ==
Brønnøy Municipality is responsible for primary education (through 10th grade), outpatient health services, senior citizen services, welfare and other social services, zoning, economic development, and municipal roads and utilities. The municipality is governed by a municipal council of directly elected representatives. The mayor is indirectly elected by a vote of the municipal council. The municipality is under the jurisdiction of the Helgeland District Court and the Hålogaland Court of Appeal.

=== Municipal council ===
The municipal council (Kommunestyre) of Brønnøy Municipality is made up of 23 representatives that are elected to four year terms. The tables below show the current and historical composition of the council by political party.

Brønnøy kommunestyre 2023–2027
| Party name (in Norwegian) | Number of representatives |
|---|---|
| Labour Party (Arbeiderpartiet) | 10 |
| Progress Party (Fremskrittspartiet) | 2 |
| Conservative Party (Høyre) | 5 |
| Red Party (Rødt) | 2 |
| Centre Party (Senterpartiet) | 2 |
| Socialist Left Party (Sosialistisk Venstreparti) | 2 |
| Total number of members: | 23 |

Brønnøy kommunestyre 2019–2023
| Party name (in Norwegian) | Number of representatives |
|---|---|
| Labour Party (Arbeiderpartiet) | 7 |
| Progress Party (Fremskrittspartiet) | 1 |
| Conservative Party (Høyre) | 4 |
| Red Party (Rødt) | 2 |
| Centre Party (Senterpartiet) | 11 |
| Socialist Left Party (Sosialistisk Venstreparti) | 1 |
| Liberal Party (Venstre) | 1 |
| Total number of members: | 27 |

Brønnøy kommunestyre 2015–2019
| Party name (in Norwegian) | Number of representatives |
|---|---|
| Labour Party (Arbeiderpartiet) | 10 |
| Conservative Party (Høyre) | 4 |
| Centre Party (Senterpartiet) | 6 |
| Socialist Left Party (Sosialistisk Venstreparti) | 1 |
| Liberal Party (Venstre) | 6 |
| Total number of members: | 27 |

Brønnøy kommunestyre 2011–2015
| Party name (in Norwegian) | Number of representatives |
|---|---|
| Labour Party (Arbeiderpartiet) | 10 |
| Progress Party (Fremskrittspartiet) | 1 |
| Conservative Party (Høyre) | 9 |
| Centre Party (Senterpartiet) | 5 |
| Socialist Left Party (Sosialistisk Venstreparti) | 1 |
| Liberal Party (Venstre) | 1 |
| Total number of members: | 27 |

Brønnøy kommunestyre 2007–2011
| Party name (in Norwegian) | Number of representatives |
|---|---|
| Labour Party (Arbeiderpartiet) | 4 |
| Progress Party (Fremskrittspartiet) | 2 |
| Conservative Party (Høyre) | 2 |
| Christian Democratic Party (Kristelig Folkeparti) | 1 |
| Centre Party (Senterpartiet) | 12 |
| Socialist Left Party (Sosialistisk Venstreparti) | 2 |
| Liberal Party (Venstre) | 2 |
| Brønnøy cooperative list (Brønnøy samarbeidsliste) | 2 |
| Total number of members: | 27 |

Brønnøy kommunestyre 2003–2007
| Party name (in Norwegian) | Number of representatives |
|---|---|
| Labour Party (Arbeiderpartiet) | 6 |
| Progress Party (Fremskrittspartiet) | 3 |
| Conservative Party (Høyre) | 3 |
| Christian Democratic Party (Kristelig Folkeparti) | 1 |
| Coastal Party (Kystpartiet) | 1 |
| Centre Party (Senterpartiet) | 5 |
| Socialist Left Party (Sosialistisk Venstreparti) | 3 |
| Liberal Party (Venstre) | 4 |
| Cross-party list (Tverrpolitisk liste) | 1 |
| Total number of members: | 27 |

Brønnøy kommunestyre 1999–2003
| Party name (in Norwegian) | Number of representatives |
|---|---|
| Labour Party (Arbeiderpartiet) | 9 |
| Progress Party (Fremskrittspartiet) | 1 |
| Conservative Party (Høyre) | 4 |
| Christian Democratic Party (Kristelig Folkeparti) | 2 |
| Coastal Party (Kystpartiet) | 1 |
| Centre Party (Senterpartiet) | 5 |
| Socialist Left Party (Sosialistisk Venstreparti) | 6 |
| Liberal Party (Venstre) | 2 |
| Cross-party list (Tverrpolitisk liste) | 3 |
| Total number of members: | 33 |

Brønnøy kommunestyre 1995–1999
| Party name (in Norwegian) | Number of representatives |
|---|---|
| Labour Party (Arbeiderpartiet) | 14 |
| Progress Party (Fremskrittspartiet) | 1 |
| Conservative Party (Høyre) | 4 |
| Christian Democratic Party (Kristelig Folkeparti) | 1 |
| Centre Party (Senterpartiet) | 10 |
| Socialist Left Party (Sosialistisk Venstreparti) | 3 |
| Total number of members: | 33 |

Brønnøy kommunestyre 1991–1995
| Party name (in Norwegian) | Number of representatives |
|---|---|
| Labour Party (Arbeiderpartiet) | 14 |
| Conservative Party (Høyre) | 6 |
| Christian Democratic Party (Kristelig Folkeparti) | 1 |
| Centre Party (Senterpartiet) | 8 |
| Socialist Left Party (Sosialistisk Venstreparti) | 4 |
| Total number of members: | 33 |

Brønnøy kommunestyre 1987–1991
| Party name (in Norwegian) | Number of representatives |
|---|---|
| Labour Party (Arbeiderpartiet) | 18 |
| Progress Party (Fremskrittspartiet) | 1 |
| Conservative Party (Høyre) | 6 |
| Christian Democratic Party (Kristelig Folkeparti) | 1 |
| Centre Party (Senterpartiet) | 3 |
| Socialist Left Party (Sosialistisk Venstreparti) | 3 |
| Liberal Party (Venstre) | 1 |
| Total number of members: | 33 |

Brønnøy kommunestyre 1983–1987
| Party name (in Norwegian) | Number of representatives |
|---|---|
| Labour Party (Arbeiderpartiet) | 15 |
| Conservative Party (Høyre) | 8 |
| Christian Democratic Party (Kristelig Folkeparti) | 2 |
| Red Electoral Alliance (Rød Valgallianse) | 1 |
| Centre Party (Senterpartiet) | 2 |
| Socialist Left Party (Sosialistisk Venstreparti) | 4 |
| Liberal Party (Venstre) | 1 |
| Total number of members: | 33 |

Brønnøy kommunestyre 1979–1983
| Party name (in Norwegian) | Number of representatives |
|---|---|
| Labour Party (Arbeiderpartiet) | 13 |
| Conservative Party (Høyre) | 10 |
| Christian Democratic Party (Kristelig Folkeparti) | 3 |
| Centre Party (Senterpartiet) | 3 |
| Socialist Left Party (Sosialistisk Venstreparti) | 3 |
| Liberal Party (Venstre) | 1 |
| Total number of members: | 33 |

Brønnøy kommunestyre 1975–1979
| Party name (in Norwegian) | Number of representatives |
|---|---|
| Labour Party (Arbeiderpartiet) | 14 |
| Conservative Party (Høyre) | 10 |
| Christian Democratic Party (Kristelig Folkeparti) | 4 |
| Centre Party (Senterpartiet) | 12 |
| Socialist Left Party (Sosialistisk Venstreparti) | 4 |
| Liberal Party (Venstre) | 1 |
| Total number of members: | 45 |

Brønnøy kommunestyre 1971–1975
| Party name (in Norwegian) | Number of representatives |
|---|---|
| Labour Party (Arbeiderpartiet) | 19 |
| Conservative Party (Høyre) | 5 |
| Christian Democratic Party (Kristelig Folkeparti) | 3 |
| Centre Party (Senterpartiet) | 11 |
| Socialist People's Party (Sosialistisk Folkeparti) | 5 |
| Liberal Party (Venstre) | 2 |
| Total number of members: | 45 |

Brønnøy kommunestyre 1967–1971
| Party name (in Norwegian) | Number of representatives |
|---|---|
| Labour Party (Arbeiderpartiet) | 20 |
| Conservative Party (Høyre) | 5 |
| Christian Democratic Party (Kristelig Folkeparti) | 3 |
| Centre Party (Senterpartiet) | 7 |
| Socialist People's Party (Sosialistisk Folkeparti) | 5 |
| Liberal Party (Venstre) | 3 |
| Local List(s) (Lokale lister) | 2 |
| Total number of members: | 45 |

Brønnøy kommunestyre 1963–1967
| Party name (in Norwegian) | Number of representatives |
|---|---|
| Labour Party (Arbeiderpartiet) | 21 |
| Conservative Party (Høyre) | 5 |
| Christian Democratic Party (Kristelig Folkeparti) | 3 |
| Centre Party (Senterpartiet) | 6 |
| Socialist People's Party (Sosialistisk Folkeparti) | 4 |
| Joint List(s) of Non-Socialist Parties (Borgerlige Felleslister) | 6 |
| Total number of members: | 45 |

Brønnøy herredsstyre 1959–1963
| Party name (in Norwegian) | Number of representatives |
|---|---|
| Labour Party (Arbeiderpartiet) | 5 |
| Christian Democratic Party (Kristelig Folkeparti) | 1 |
| List of workers, fishermen, and small farmholders (Arbeidere, fiskere, småbrukere liste) | 3 |
| Joint List(s) of Non-Socialist Parties (Borgerlige Felleslister) | 2 |
| Local List(s) (Lokale lister) | 6 |
| Total number of members: | 17 |

Brønnøy herredsstyre 1955–1959
| Party name (in Norwegian) | Number of representatives |
|---|---|
| Labour Party (Arbeiderpartiet) | 7 |
| Christian Democratic Party (Kristelig Folkeparti) | 2 |
| Joint List(s) of Non-Socialist Parties (Borgerlige Felleslister) | 3 |
| Local List(s) (Lokale lister) | 5 |
| Total number of members: | 17 |

Brønnøy herredsstyre 1951–1955
| Party name (in Norwegian) | Number of representatives |
|---|---|
| Labour Party (Arbeiderpartiet) | 11 |
| Joint List(s) of Non-Socialist Parties (Borgerlige Felleslister) | 5 |
| Total number of members: | 16 |

Brønnøy herredsstyre 1947–1951
| Party name (in Norwegian) | Number of representatives |
|---|---|
| Labour Party (Arbeiderpartiet) | 7 |
| Joint List(s) of Non-Socialist Parties (Borgerlige Felleslister) | 5 |
| Local List(s) (Lokale lister) | 4 |
| Total number of members: | 16 |

Brønnøy herredsstyre 1945–1947
| Party name (in Norwegian) | Number of representatives |
|---|---|
| Labour Party (Arbeiderpartiet) | 8 |
| List of workers, fishermen, and small farmholders (Arbeidere, fiskere, småbrukere liste) | 4 |
| Local List(s) (Lokale lister) | 4 |
| Total number of members: | 16 |

Brønnøy herredsstyre 1937–1941*
| Party name (in Norwegian) | Number of representatives |
|---|---|
| Labour Party (Arbeiderpartiet) | 5 |
| Local List(s) (Lokale lister) | 11 |
| Total number of members: | 16 |
Note: Due to the German occupation of Norway during World War II, no elections were held for new municipal councils until after the war ended in 1945.

=== Mayors ===
The mayor (Norwegian: ordfører) of Brønnøy Municipality is the political leader of the municipality and the chairperson of the municipal council. Here is a list of people who have held this position:

- 1838–1844: Ole Christian Andersen Nøstvig
- 1845–1848: Benjamin Jakobsen Opsjøn
- 1849–1852: Christian Holst
- 1853–1880: Sivert Andreas Nielsen (V)
- 1881–1882: Thomas Holst (H)
- 1883–1884: Andreas Olai Olsen (V)
- 1885–1886: Lorentz Larsen (V)
- 1887–1888: Bendik E. Jacobsen (V)
- 1889–1900: Christen Heide Nielsen (V)
- 1901–1904: Christen Abel Sellæg (H)
- 1905–1907: Tørris Hanssen Tilrem (V)
- 1908–1913: Wilhelm Magelssen Ottesen
- 1914–1916: Arnt Jakobsen Moe (V)
- 1917–1919: Wilhelm Magelssen Ottesen
- 1920–1922: Henrik Brækkan (H)
- 1923–1923: Johan J. Nordhus (LL)
- 1923–1925: Arnt Jakobsen Moe (LL)
- 1926–1928: Jørgen Kristian Skille (V)
- 1929–1941: Siegvart Melthor Nygaard (V)
- 1941–1945: Peder Strand (NS)
- 1945–1945: Siegvart Melthor Nygaard (V)
- 1946–1959: Martin Aakerøy (Ap)
- 1960–1963: Henrik G. Fagerland (V)
- 1964–1967: Gustav B. Skog (Ap)
- 1968–1975: Kristian Sandvik (Ap)
- 1975–1979: Bodil Aakre (H)
- 1980–1983: Kristian Sandvik (Ap)
- 1983–1995: Harald Solbakk (Ap)
- 1995–1999: Ragnvald Dundas (Sp)
- 1999–2013: Kjell Harald Trælnes (Sp)
- 2013–2019: Johnny Hanssen (Ap)
- 2019–2023: Eilif Trælnes (Sp)
- 2023–present: Siv Aglen (Ap)

== Notable people ==
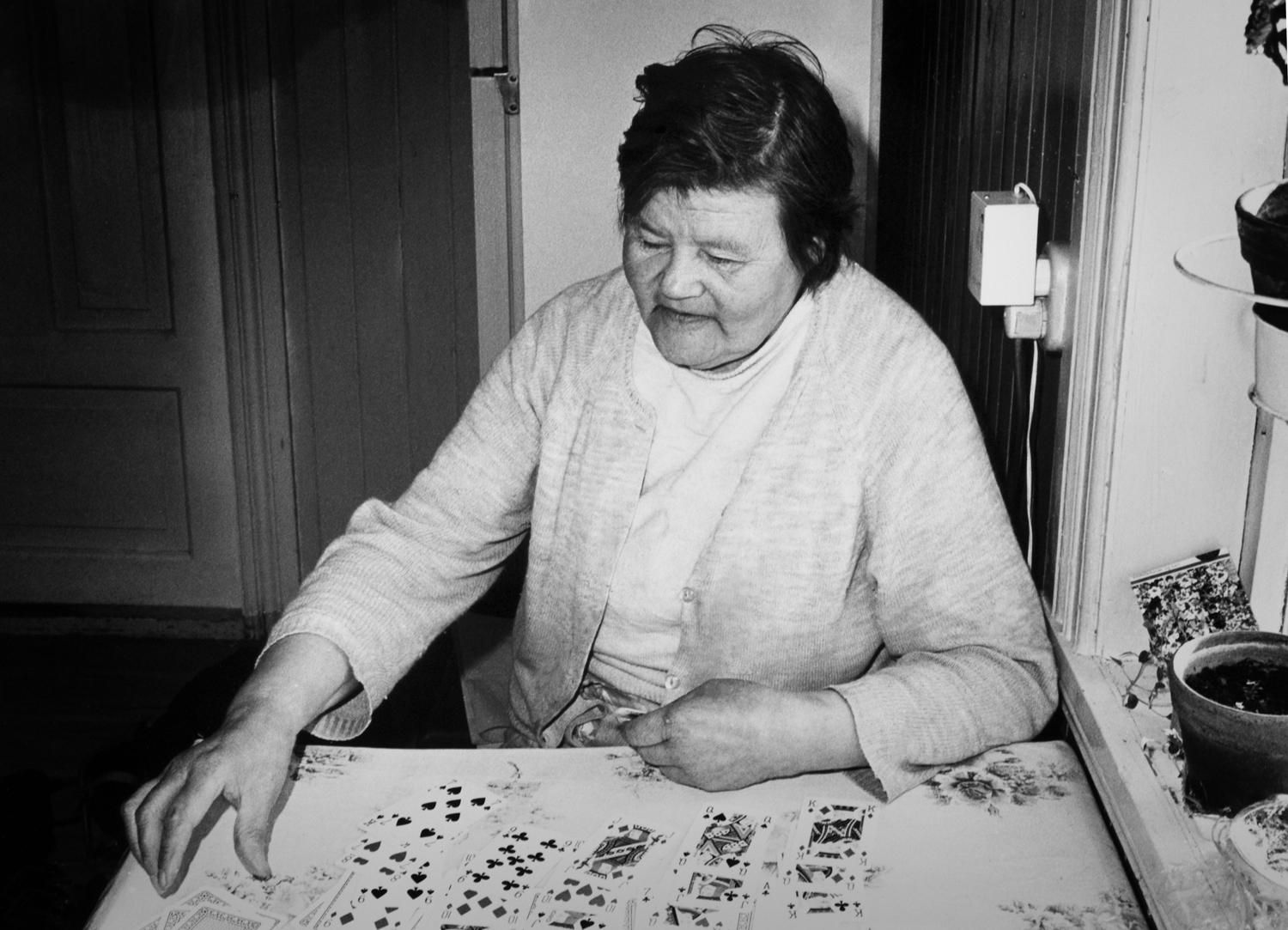
Kristine Andersen Vesterfjell

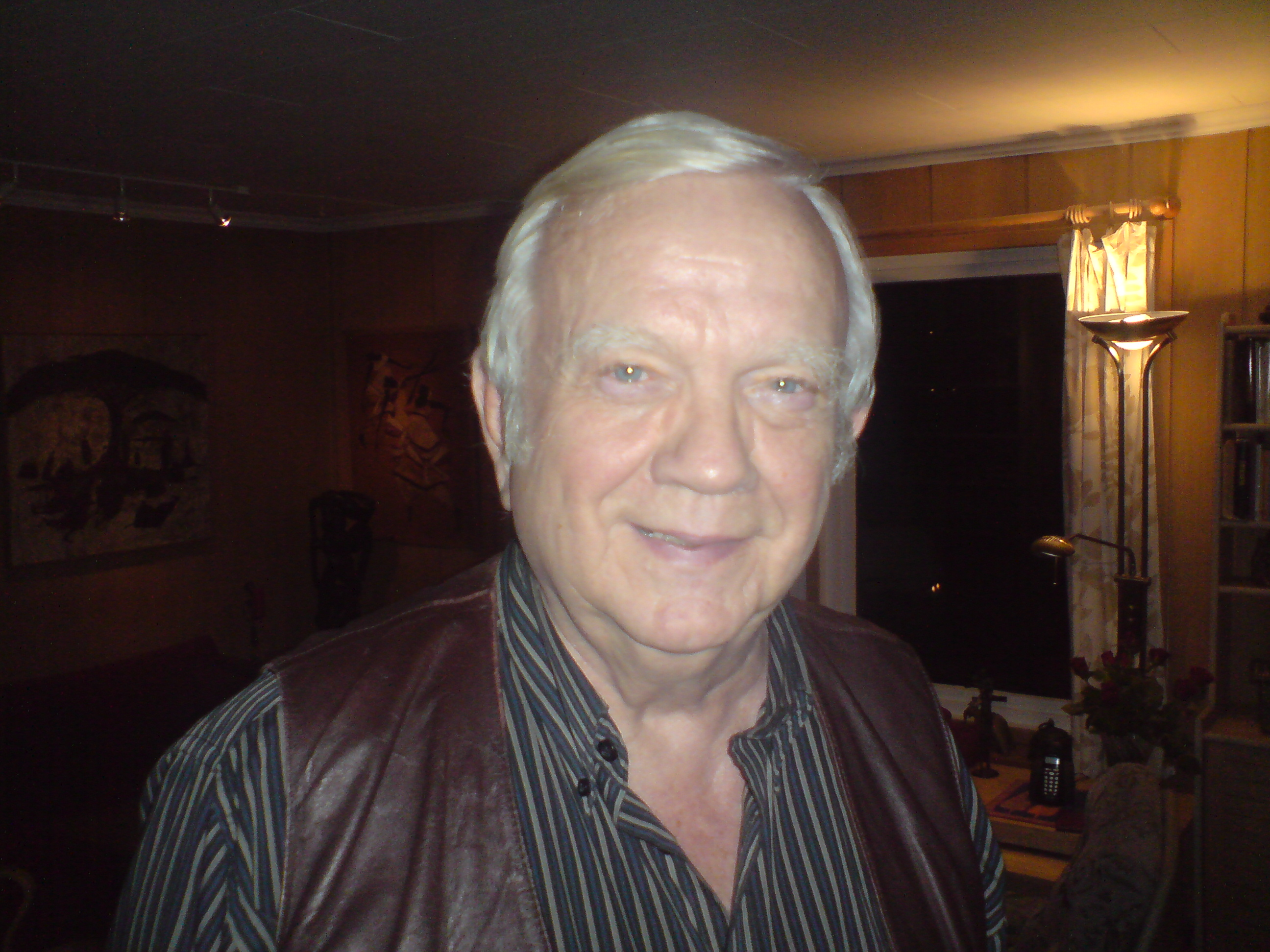
Halle Jørn Hanssen, 2007

- Hans Rosing (1625 at Brønnøy – 1699), a clergyman and Bishop of the Diocese of Oslo from 1664-1699
- Skule Storheill (1907 in Brønnøysund – 1992), a prominent Norwegian naval officer
- Kristine Andersen Vesterfjell (1910 in Lomsdalen – 1987), a South Sami reindeer herder and cultural advocate
- Kåre Rodahl (1917 in Brønnøysund – 2008), a physician, physiologist, a research fellow in Arctic physiology and medicine and professor at the Norwegian School of Sport Sciences
- Odd Grønmo (1922 in Brønnøy - 2012), a Norwegian politician who was Mayor of Bodin & Nordland
- Ørjar Øyen (born 1927 in Brønnøy), a sociologist and academic
- Dag Skogheim (1928–2015) a teacher, a poet, novelist, biographer, and non-fiction writer who grew up in Brønnøysund
- Halle Jørn Hanssen (born 1937 in Brønnøy), a TV correspondent, development aid administrator, and politician
- Rawdna Carita Eira (born 1970), a Norwegian and Sámi playwright, author, teacher, reindeer herder, and stage manager whoArtikkelserien «Fra Brønnøysunds saga» av tidligere ordfører Einar Olaussen (Høvding), publisert som føljetong i Brønnøysunds Avis i 1925 og 1926 grew up in Brønnøysund
- Pål Arne Johansen (born 1977 in Brønnøy), a retired football midfielder and manager
- Ulrik Saltnes (born 1992 in Brønnøysund), a footballer with almost 200 club caps

== See also ==
- Norwegian Aquaculture Center
