= Rodahl =

Rodahl, Rødahl is a surname. Notable people with the surname include:

- Kåre Rodahl (1917–2008), Norwegian physician and physiologist
- Monique Rodahl (born 1960), New Zealand swimmer
- Sverre Rødahl (born 1950), Norwegian stage producer and theatre director
