= Tosbotnet =

Village in Brønnøy Municipality, Norway

Tosbotnet Tosbotn
- Village
- Interactive map of Tosbotnet
- Location within Nordland Location within Norway
- Coordinates: 65.32602°N 12.95805°E
- Country: Norway
- Region: Northern Norway
- County: Nordland
- District: Helgeland
- Municipality: Brønnøy Municipality
- Elevation: 6 m (20 ft)
- Time zone: UTC+01:00 (CET)
  - Summer (DST): UTC+02:00 (CEST)
- Post Code: 8960 Velfjord

Tosbotnet is a village in Brønnøy Municipality in Nordland county, Norway. The village is located at the end of the Tosenfjord arm of the Bindalsfjorden. The village is mostly a tourist center. It is located along Norwegian County Road 76, north of the village of Lande and just east of the 6-kilometre (3.7 mi) long Tosen Tunnel which connects Brønnøy Municipality to the European route E6 highway in Grane Municipality.
