= Trælnes Chapel =

Church in Nordland, Norway

- Trælnes kapell
- Trælnes Chapel
- 65.39494309°N 12.18249544°E
- Location: Brønnøy Municipality, Nordland
- Country: Norway
- Denomination: Church of Norway
- Churchmanship: Evangelical Lutheran

History
- Status: Chapel
- Founded: 1980
- Consecrated: 1980

Architecture
- Functional status: Active
- Architectural type: Long church
- Completed: 1980 (46 years ago)

Specifications
- Materials: Wood

Administration
- Diocese: Sør-Hålogaland
- Deanery: Sør-Helgeland prosti
- Parish: Brønnøy

Trælnes Chapel (Norwegian: Trælnes kapell) is a chapel of the Church of Norway in Brønnøy Municipality in Nordland county, Norway. It is located just north of the village of Trælnes. It is an annex chapel in the Brønnøy parish which is part of the Sør-Helgeland prosti (deanery) in the Diocese of Sør-Hålogaland. The wooden chapel was built in a long church style in 1980.

== See also ==
- List of churches in Sør-Hålogaland
