= Ole Christian Andersen Nøstvig =

Norwegian farmer and politician

Ole Christian Andersen Nøstvig (10 June 1782 – 3 June 1852) was a Norwegian farmer and politician.

Nøstvig was born in the Velfjord parish in the traditional district of Helgeland in Nordland, Norway. He was the son of Anders Knudsen Nøstvig and Inger Olsdatter. He took over the family farm in 1804 and farmed throughout life. He was mayor of Brønnøysund for several years dating from 1838. He was a deputy representative in 1827 and was elected to the Norwegian Parliament in 1830, 1833, 1836, 1842 and 1845, representing the rural constituency of Nordlands Amt (now Nordland).
