= Torghatten =

Granite dome in Brønnøy, Nordland, Norway

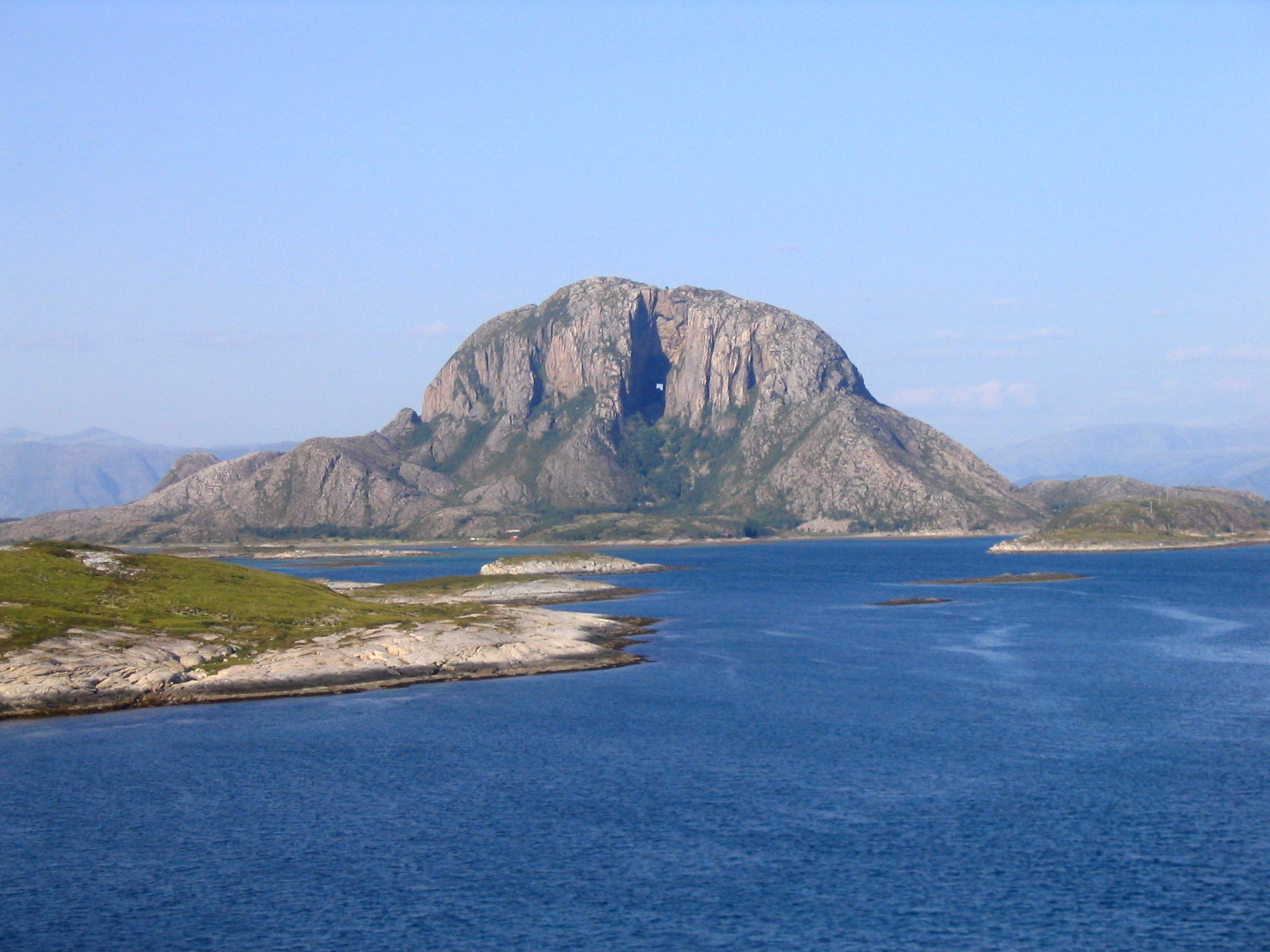
- View of the mountain

Highest point
- Elevation: 258 m (846 ft)
- Prominence: 258 m (846 ft)
- Coordinates: 65°23′54″N 12°05′23″E

Geography
- Interactive map of the mountain
- Location: Brønnøy Municipality, Nordland, Norway
- Topo map: 1725 I Brønnøysund

Torghatten is a granite dome on the island of Torget in Brønnøy Municipality in Nordland county, Norway. It is known for its characteristic hole, or natural tunnel, through its centre. It is possible to walk up to the tunnel on a well-prepared path, and through it on a natural path.

On 6 May 1988, Widerøe Flight 710 from Namsos Airport to Brønnøysund Airport crashed into the side of the mountain, and all 36 passengers and crew died. It has given its name to Torghatten, one of the four major ferry operators in Norway, based in near-by Brønnøysund.

== Tunnel ==
Torghatten is a mountain located along the coastal area of northern Norway that features a distinctive natural tunnel passing completely through it. According to legend, the hole was made by the troll Hestmannen while he was chasing the beautiful woman Lekamøya. As the troll realized he would not overtake her, he released an arrow to kill her, but the troll-king of Sømna threw his hat into the arrow's path to save her. The hat turned into the mountain with a hole in the middle.

The tunnel measures 166 metres in length, with an average width of 18 metres and an average height of 41 metres, and sits about 115 metres above current sea level at its midpoint. The mountain consists of foliated granite of Proterozoic age, with the foliation (layered structure of the rock) oriented almost vertically, creating natural weakness zones that have facilitated erosion processes. It was formed during the Scandinavian ice age. Ice and water eroded the looser rocks, while the harder ones in the mountain top have resisted erosion.

For many years, the prevailing hypothesis attributed the formation of the tunnel primarily to wave action from the North Atlantic Ocean. However, research by Jakob Johan Møller and Per Tore Fredriksen published in the Norwegian Journal of Geography suggests a more complex origin. Their investigation revealed a lack of rounded cobbles and boulders that would typically indicate significant wave erosion. Instead, they documented several features suggesting glacial influence, including ice-sculptured bedrock on the hillside approaching the eastern entrance, an elongated uphill-curving channel likely formed by subglacial meltwater, polished areas on the northern wall inside the tunnel, and slightly rounded bedrock obstacles within the tunnel. These features are consistent with what geologists term "p-forms" (plastically-moulded forms), which develop through ice flowing under pressure and high-pressure meltwater flowing beneath glaciers.

During the late Weichselian glacial maximum approximately 20,000–22,000 years ago, the coastal area around Torghatten was covered by roughly 1,000 metres of ice. When this ice retreated about 12,000 years ago, sea levels were about 100 metres higher than present day, as indicated by a beach ridge of rounded boulders and cobbles on the north-eastern side of the mountain. The late Weichselian marine limit is about 15 metres lower than the elevation of the floor in the middle of the tunnel, suggesting that wave action during this period would have had limited impact on further development of the tunnel.

A fundamental question in understanding the tunnel's formation is how the initial opening through the mountain developed. Møller and Fredriksen propose that subglacial processes were more likely than wave action to create the first narrow passage. The water pressure beneath a glacier would have been substantially higher than that generated by storm waves, and glacial periods lasted considerably longer than the relatively brief intervals when sea levels were at suitable elevations for waves to affect the mountain. The freshness of polished surfaces both inside and outside the tunnel, despite abundant evidence of recent weathering and rockfalls, suggests these features may have developed during the most recent glaciation.

Based on the landforms observed outside and inside the tunnel, the researchers conclude that Torghatten's tunnel is a polygenetic landform that has developed through multiple processes over time, including subglacial meltwater drainage, plastically sliding ice during glaciations, and wave action during periods of higher relative sea level following deglaciations. The tunnel has probably evolved over the course of at least two glacial cycles, making it a geological feature that provides insight into the complex interplay of erosional processes that have shaped Norway's coastal landscape.

== Media gallery ==
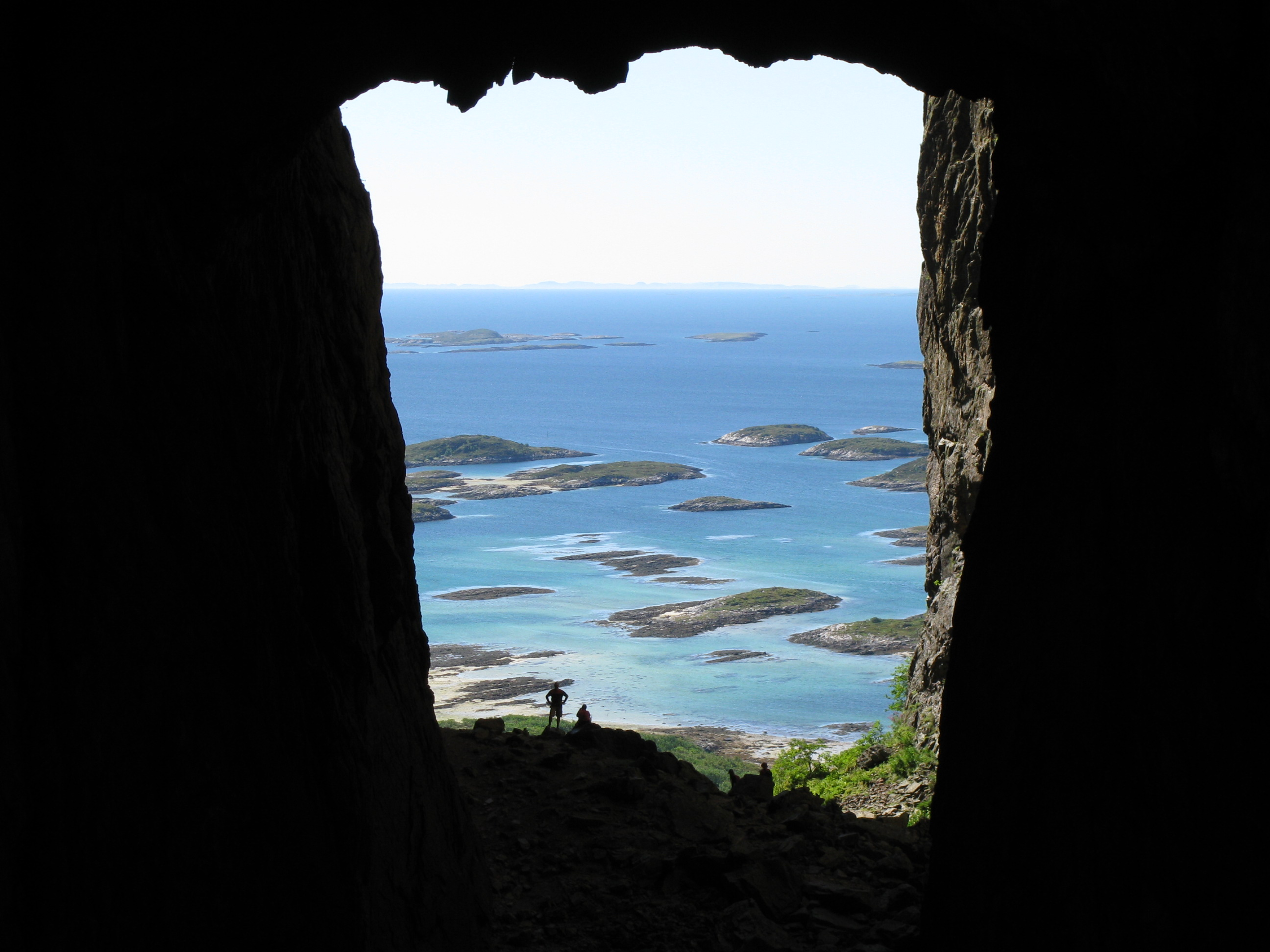
The large hole in Torghatten

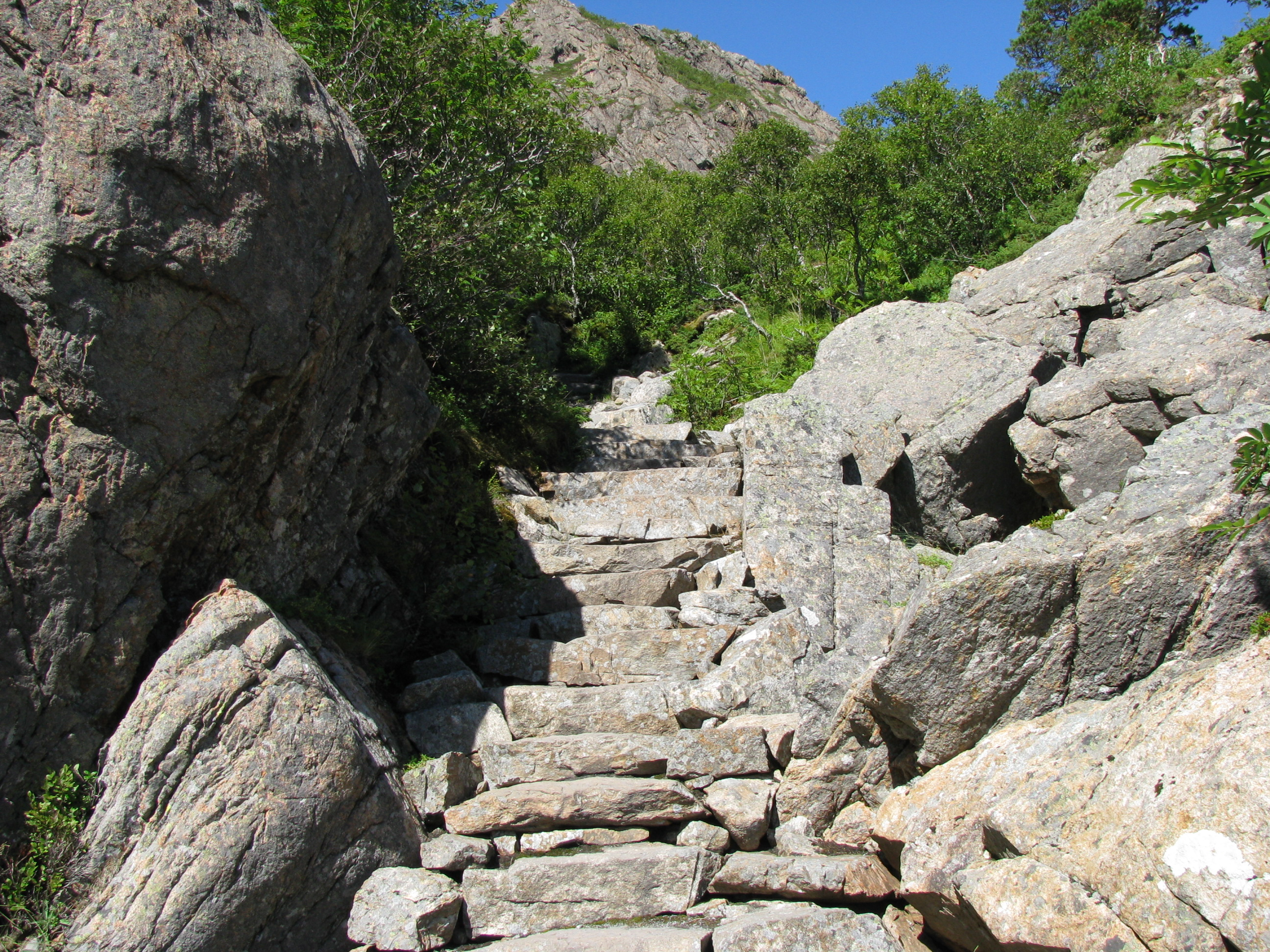
The climb up to the hole

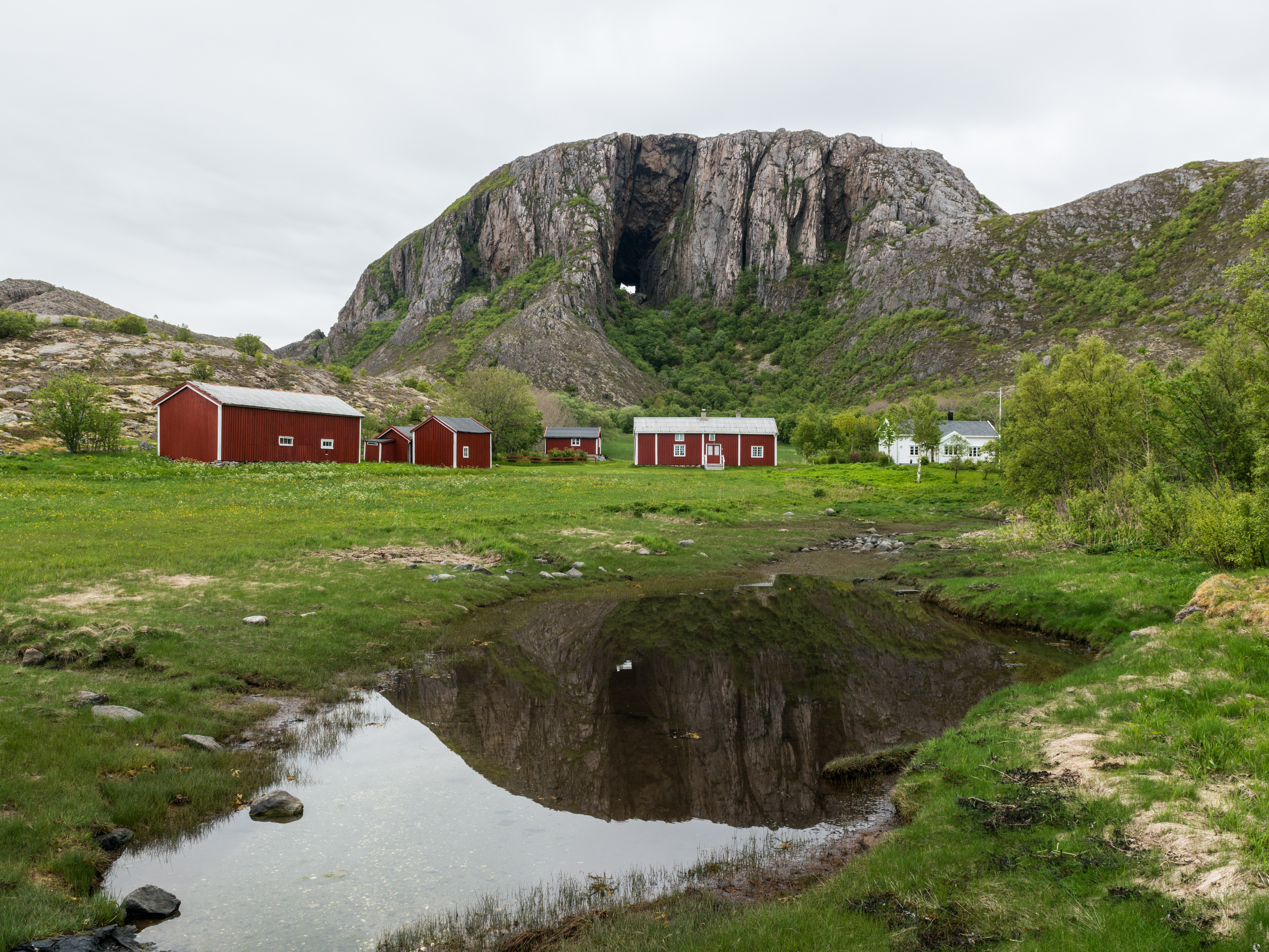
View from the south

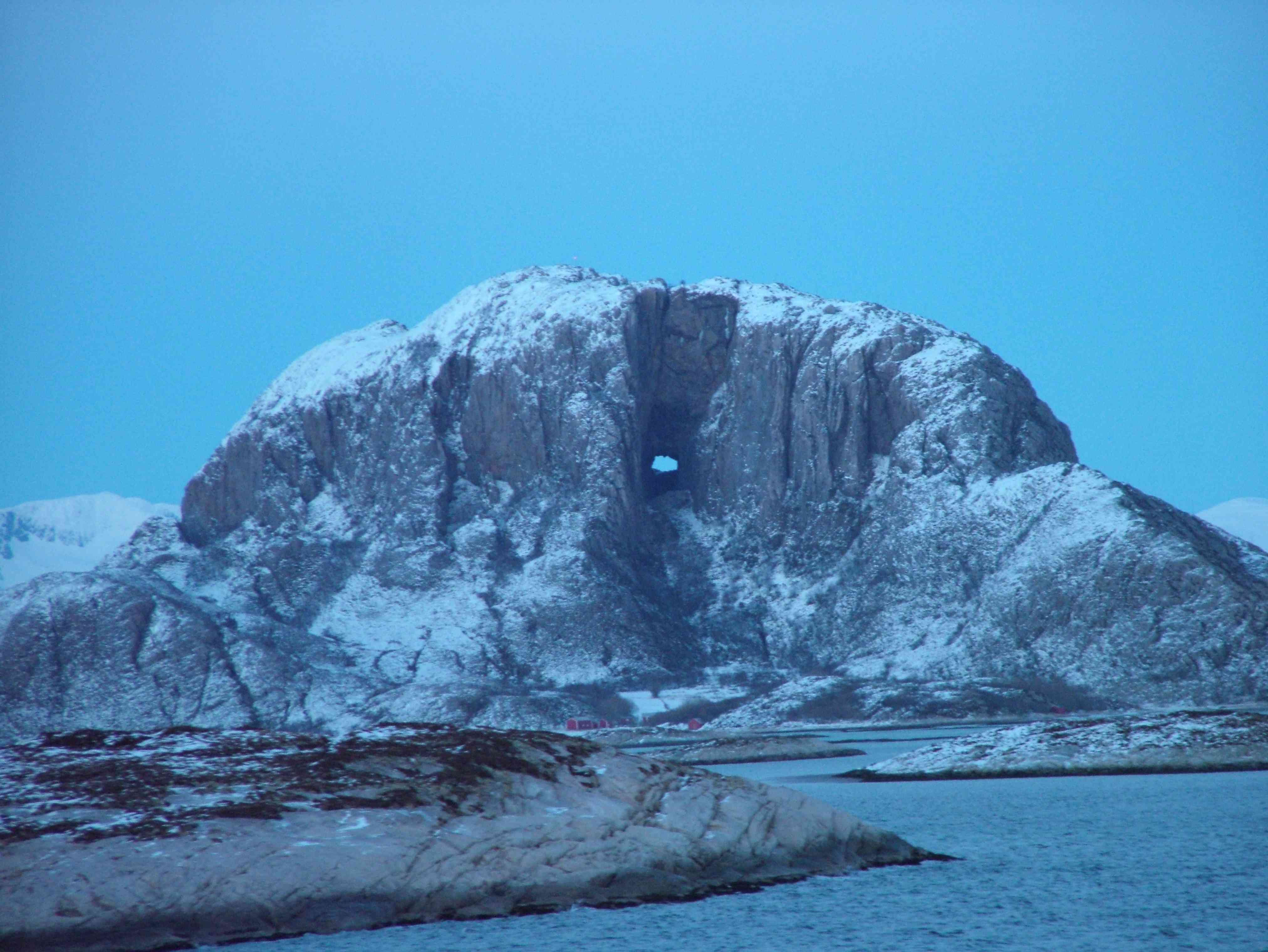
Torghatten in February

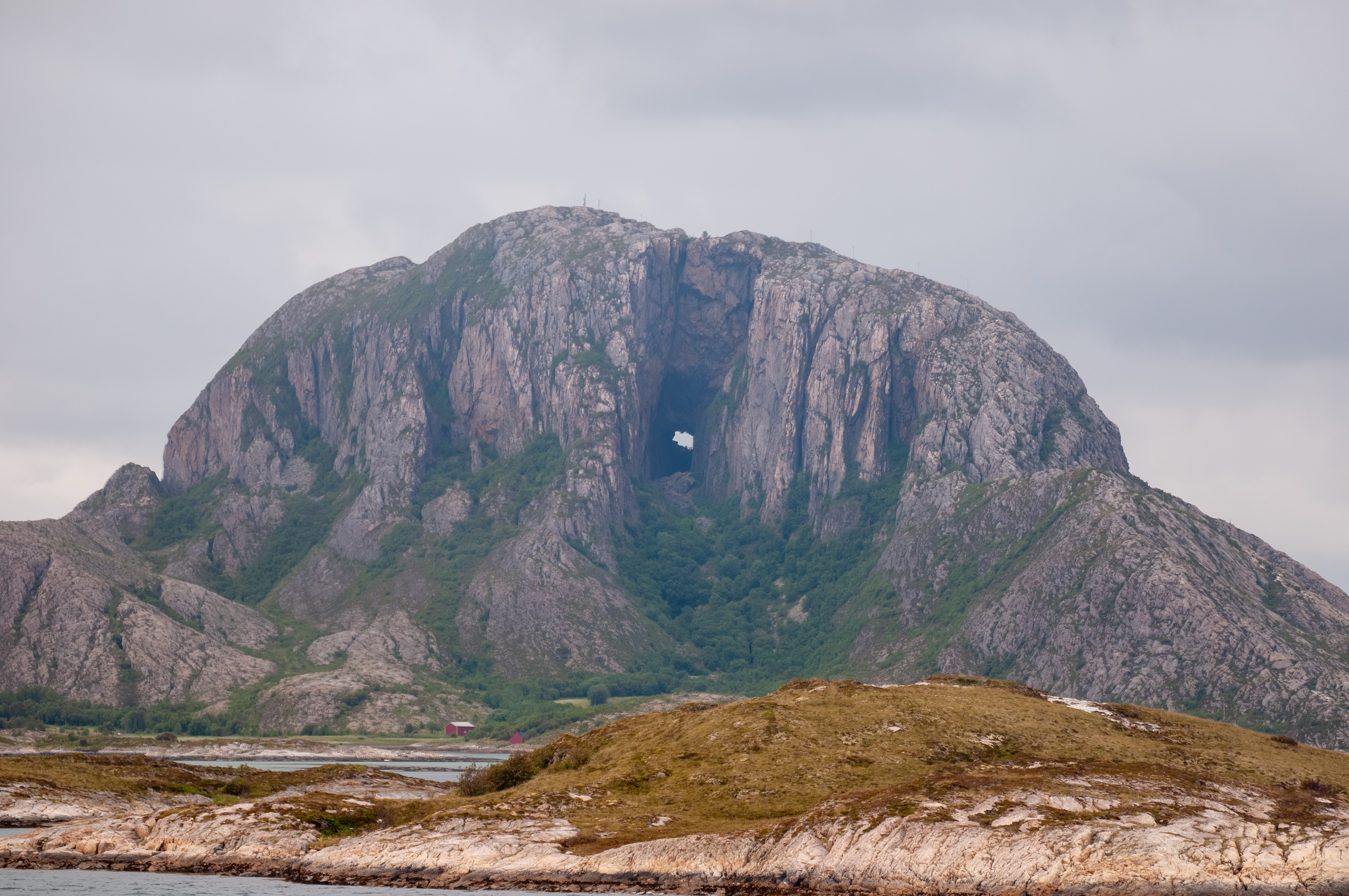
Torghatten Mountain taken from the MV Viking Sea

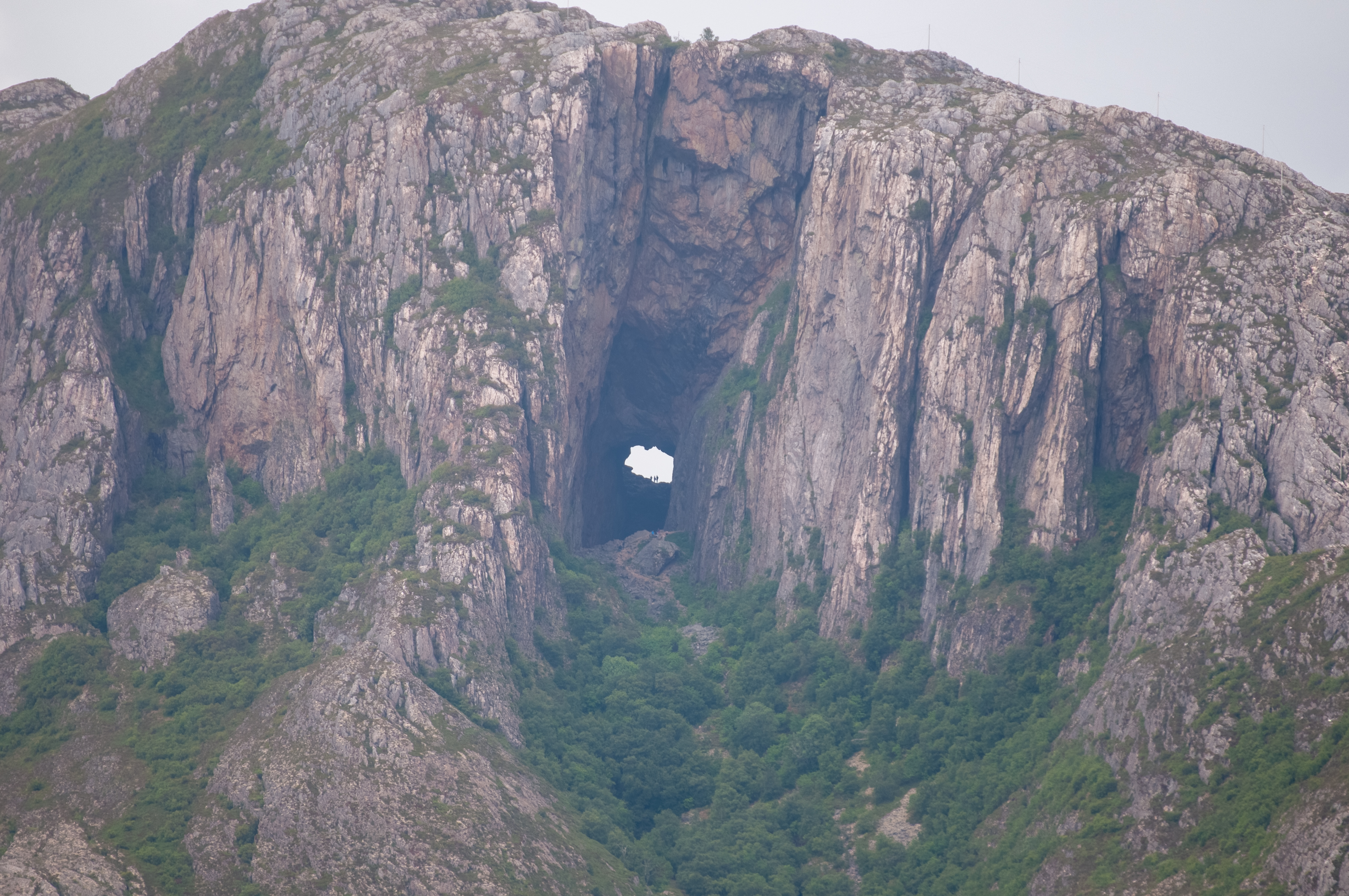
Closeup of the hole

== See also ==
- Monte Forato, in the Alpi Apuane
- Moon Hill, in Yangshuo County
- Elephant Trunk Hill, in Guilin
