= Skogmo Chapel =

Church in Nordland, Norway

- Skogmo kapell
- Skogmo Chapel
- 65.47404316°N 12.35603839°E
- Location: Brønnøy Municipality, Nordland
- Country: Norway
- Denomination: Church of Norway
- Churchmanship: Evangelical Lutheran

History
- Status: Chapel
- Founded: 1979
- Consecrated: 1979

Architecture
- Functional status: Active
- Architectural type: Long church
- Completed: 1979 (47 years ago)

Specifications
- Materials: Wood

Administration
- Diocese: Sør-Hålogaland
- Deanery: Sør-Helgeland prosti
- Parish: Brønnøy

Skogmo Chapel (Norwegian: Skogmo kapell) is a chapel of the Church of Norway in Brønnøy Municipality in Nordland county, Norway. It is located in the village of Indreskomo. It is an annex chapel in the Brønnøy parish which is part of the Sør-Helgeland prosti (deanery) in the Diocese of Sør-Hålogaland. The white, wooden chapel was built in a long church style in 1979.

== See also ==
- List of churches in Sør-Hålogaland
