= Skogmo (surname) =

Skogmo is a Norwegian surname. Notable people with the surname include:

- Bjørn Skogmo (born 1940), Norwegian diplomat
- George B. Skogmo (1880–1968), American politician
- Jens Kristian Skogmo (born 1987), Norwegian footballer
