= Holm, Nordland =

Village in Bindal Municipality, Norway

Holm
- Village
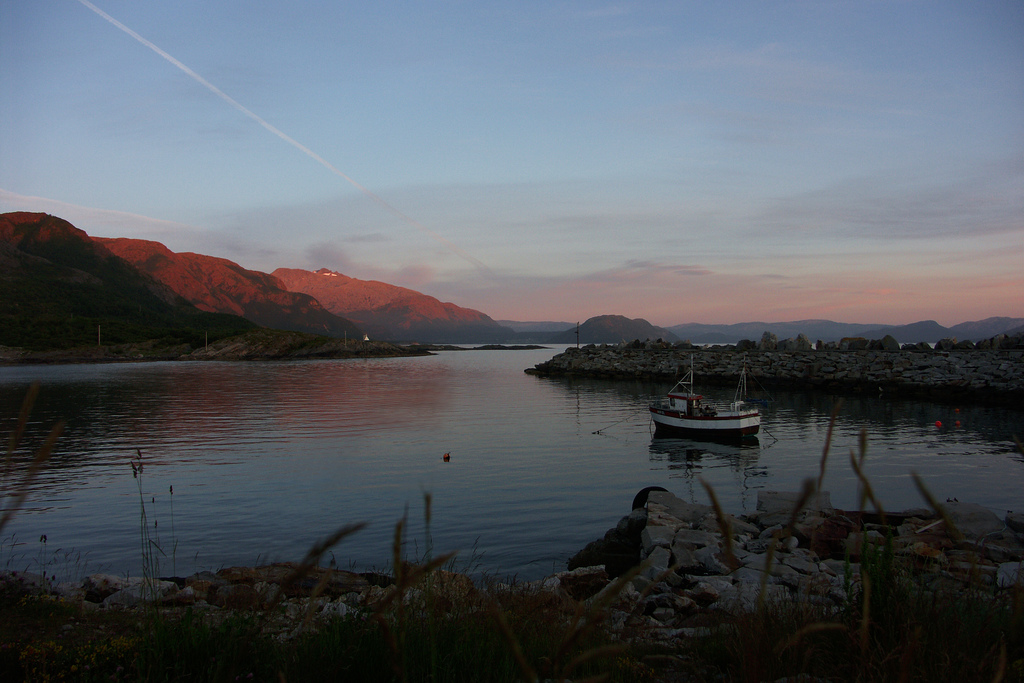
- View of the village
- Interactive map of Holm
- Location within Nordland Location within Norway
- Coordinates: 65.1832°N 12.1242°E
- Country: Norway
- Region: Northern Norway
- County: Nordland
- District: Helgeland
- Municipality: Bindal Municipality
- Elevation: 14 m (46 ft)
- Time zone: UTC+01:00 (CET)
  - Summer (DST): UTC+02:00 (CEST)
- Post Code: 7982 Bindalseidet

Holm is a village in Bindal Municipality in Nordland county, Norway. It is located on the Norwegian County Road 17, along the Bindalsfjorden, about 10 kilometres (6.2 mi) northwest of the village of Bindalseidet. Holm is also the site of Solstad Church, one of the two churches in the municipality. It is also the quay for the Bindal–Vennesund Ferry which connects Bindal Municipality and Sømna Municipality.
