= Kåre Rodahl =

Norwegian physician and physiologist

- Born: 17 August 1917; Brønnøysund, Norway
- Died: 10 July 2008 (aged 90)
- Occupations: Physician and physiologist
- Awards: Order of St. Olav

Kåre Rodahl (17 August 1917 – 10 July 2008) was a Norwegian physician and physiologist, a research fellow in Arctic physiology and medicine in the United States, and a professor at the Norwegian School of Sport Sciences.

== Personal life ==
Rodahl was born in Brønnøysund to Anton Rodahl and Tora Oppsahl. He married British-born Joan Hunter in 1946. They first met after he landed by parachute in a pasture, close to where she was milking a cow. He died in Oslo in 2008.

== Career ==
Rodahl studied medicine in Oslo. He took a break from his studies and spent the winter of 1939–1940 at Clavering Island in eastern Greenland, along with two hunters (one of whom was the renowned polar bear hunter Henry Rudi). During this winter he made glacier measurements for glaciologist Hans Wilhelmsson Ahlmann, and also collected livers from polar bears for later analysis.

While he was isolated in Greenland, Europe saw the outbreak of World War II and the German invasion of Norway, and instead of returning to Norway, Rodahl ended up in Great Britain. The hypothesis that polar bear liver contains large amounts of vitamin A was verified, and Rodahl joined another expedition for scientific seal hunting off Newfoundland. After the sealing expedition, he was transferred for military training in the United Kingdom for the rest of the war years. Back in Oslo, he graduated as a physician in 1948.

His doctoral thesis in 1950 examined animal reactions to excessive intake of vitamin A. During the following years he held research positions in Fairbanks, Alaska, and in Philadelphia. During his employment in Fairbanks at the United States Air Force Arctic Aeromedical Laboratory he conducted experiments on unknowing Alaska Native test subjects. He had his research subjects ingest substances containing iodine-131 radioisotopes under the pretense of offering medical care. In the 1990s his actions came to light and he faced inquiries by the Advisory Committee on Human Radiation Experiments (ACHRE) and the National Research Council. He returned to Oslo in 1965, where he chaired a new institute of work physiology, and from 1966 also served as a professor at the Norwegian School of Sport Sciences.

Rodahl published more than 200 scientific articles, and several books. Among his books are Tre år som fallskjermhopper (1945), The toxic effect of polar bear liver (1949), Bone as a tissue (1960), Stress på godt og ondt (1972), The physiology of work (1989), Den lange veien hjem (1992), and Aktiv alderdom (2002). He was decorated as a Knight of the Order of St. Olav in 1988.
