= P-form (geology) =

Smoothed depression eroded by ice into bedrock

A P-form (for plastically moulded form) is a smoothed depression eroded by ice into bedrock. Three classes of P-form are recognised: transverse forms, longitudinal forms and non-directional forms and each of these are further subdivided on the basis of their shape. They are present on scales from tens of centimetres to several kilometres. The term was introduced in 1965 by glaciologist R Dahl though questioned by later authors with Kor introducing the term S-form (for sculpted form) in 1991. Their origin is still debated but include i) the presence of debris within the base of moving ice, ii) of saturated till trapped between the base of a glacier and the bedrock, iii) of subglacial meltwater under pressure and iv) a mix of ice and water.
