= Lande, Norway =

Village in Brønnøy Municipality, Norway

Lande
- Village
- Interactive map of Lande
- Location within Nordland Location within Norway
- Coordinates: 65.2547°N 12.7895°E
- Country: Norway
- Region: Northern Norway
- County: Nordland
- District: Helgeland
- Municipality: Brønnøy Municipality
- Elevation: 46 m (151 ft)
- Time zone: UTC+01:00 (CET)
  - Summer (DST): UTC+02:00 (CEST)
- Post Code: 8960 Hommelstø

Lande is a village in Brønnøy Municipality in Nordland county, Norway. It is located on the Tosen fjord, an arm of the Bindalsfjorden, about 11 kilometres (6.8 mi) southwest of the village of Tosbotnet. The village is an old church site, and currently the location of Tosen Chapel.
