= Brønnøysund =

Town in Brønnøy Municipality, Norway

- Town/City
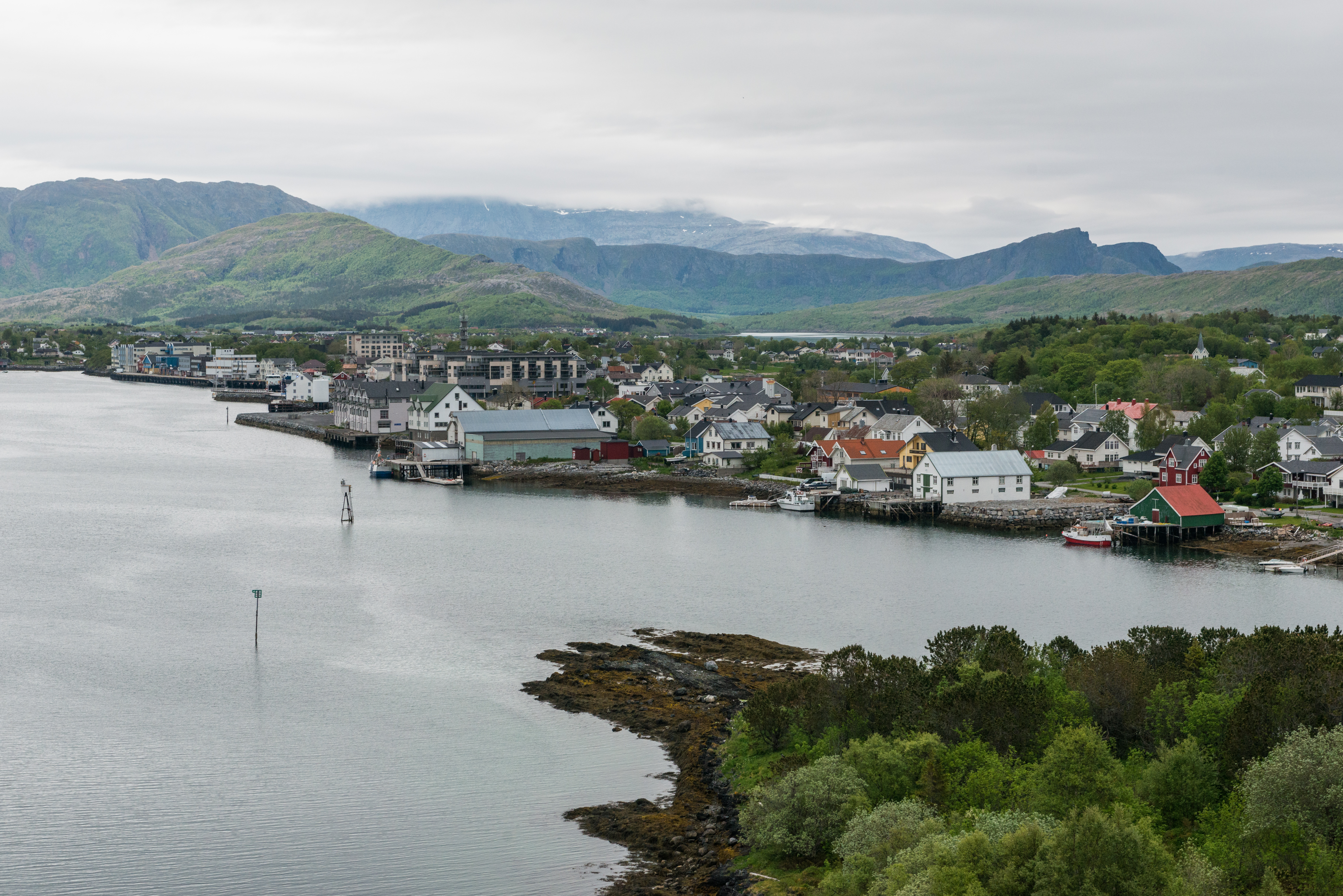
- View of the town
- Interactive map of Brønnøysund
- Location within Nordland Location within Norway
- Coordinates: 65.4681°N 12.2075°E
- Country: Norway
- Region: Northern Norway
- County: Nordland
- District: Helgeland
- Municipality: Brønnøy Municipality
- Established as
- Ladested: 1923-1964
- Town (By): 2000

Area
  - Total: 3.38 km^{2} (1.31 sq mi)
- Elevation: 8 m (26 ft)

Population (2024)
  - Total: 5,093
  - Density: 1,507/km^{2} (3,900/sq mi)
- Demonym: Brønnøyfjerding
- Time zone: UTC+01:00 (CET)
  - Summer (DST): UTC+02:00 (CEST)
- Post Code: 8900 Brønnøysund
- Former municipality
- Brønnøysund ladested
- Coat of arms

- Nordland within Norway

- Brønnøysund within Nordland
- Country: Norway
- County: Nordland
- District: Helgeland
- Established: 1 Jan 1923
  - Preceded by: Brønnøy Municipality
- Disestablished: 1 Jan 1964
  - Succeeded by: Brønnøy Municipality
- Administrative centre: Brønnøysund

Area (upon dissolution)
  - Total: 4.6 km^{2} (1.8 sq mi)
  - Rank: #652 in Norway

Population (1963)
  - Total: 1,991
  - Rank: #439 in Norway
  - Density: 432.8/km^{2} (1,121/sq mi)
  - Change (10 years): ▲ +27.3%

Official language
  - Norwegian form: Neutral
- Time zone: UTC+01:00 (CET)
  - Summer (DST): UTC+02:00 (CEST)
- ISO 3166 code: NO-1801

Brønnøysund (Urban East Norwegian pronunciation: [ˈbrœ̂nːœʏˌsʉn]) is a town and the administrative centre of Brønnøy Municipality in Nordland county, Norway. The 3.38-square-kilometre (840-acre) town has a population (2024) of 5,093 and a population density of 1,507 inhabitants per square kilometre (3,900/sq mi).

It is also a former municipality within Nordland county. The village of Brønnøysund originally was declared a ladested in 1923 which made it an independent municipality. After merging with Brønnøy Municipality in 1964, it lost its town status. Then in 2000, it once again received town status. The town lies along the coast and is often called "the coastal town in the middle of Norway." Brønnøysund is also the regional center of Southern Helgeland.

== History ==
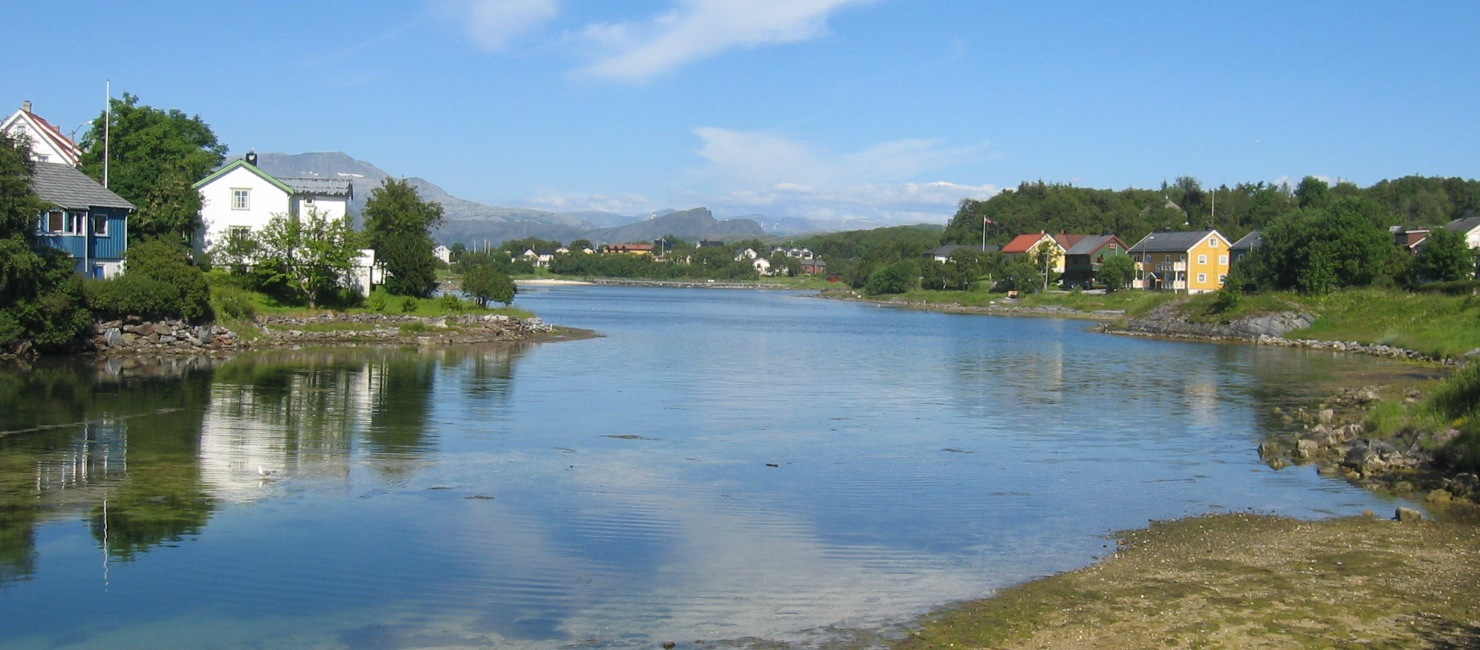
Frøkenosen estuary, Brønnøysund

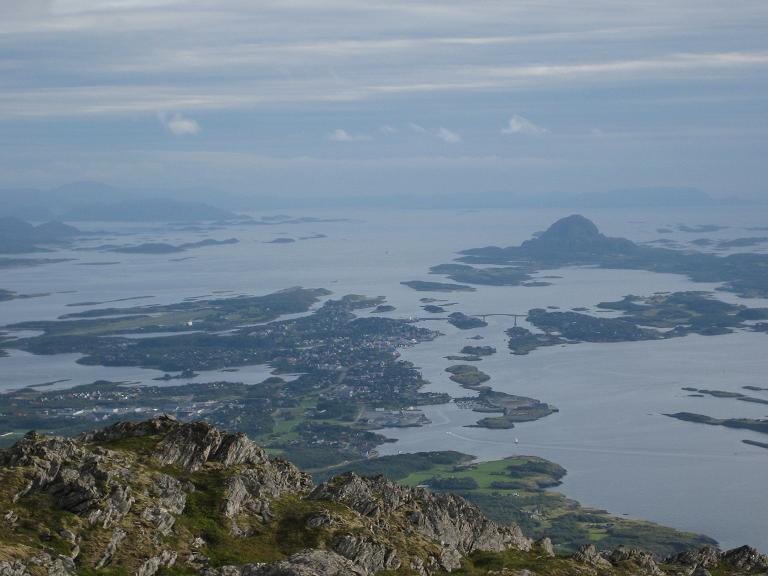
Brønnøysund and the bridge to the adjacent island Torget with Torghatten

During the Viking Age, Torgar, by the foot of the legendary mountain Torghatten, was a nationally powerful chieftain seat and an important commercial center along the coast. The original inhabitants were wiped out in an outright massacre by Duke Skule and his men in the Norwegian civil wars that raged around 1240, in the high medieval era of Norway.

The region was re-populated by immigrants from Southern Norway, Trøndelag, and Sweden, which could explain the unique dialect with a Swedish-like intonation.

In May 1945 "the prisoners [foreign POWs] from Ylvingen" were transported by ship from the harbour at Brønnøysund. ("the song saved my life") documents the farewell to Igor Trapitsin and the other Soviet ex-POWs from the harbour at Brønnøysund.

=== Name ===
The town (and former municipality) is named Brønnøysund after the small island Brønnøya (Old Norse: Brunnøy) since it is located on the island. The first element is brunnr which means "well" and the second element is øy which means "island". The final element of the name is sund which means "strait", referring to the strait of water that flows alongside the island and town. Islands with freshwater wells were important for seafarers.

=== Municipal self-government (1923-1963) ===
The village of Brønnøysund was established as a municipality on 1 January 1923 when it was separated from Brønnøy Municipality when it became a ladested (port town) and municipality of its own. During the 1960s, there were many municipal mergers across Norway due to the work of the Schei Committee. On 1 January 1964, the town of Brønnøysund (population: 2,064) was merged with Velfjord Municipality (population: 1,380), Sømna Municipality (population: 2,347), Brønnøy Municipality (population: 2,635), and the Lande-Tosen area of Bindal Municipality to form a new, enlarged Brønnøy Municipality. At that time, it lost its status as a ladested (town). In 2000, after some changes to Norwegian law, the municipality of Brønnøy designated Brønnøysund as a town once again.

Prior to its dissolution in 1964, the 4.6-square-kilometre (1.8 sq mi) municipality was the 652nd largest by area out of the 689 municipalities in Norway. Brønnøysund Municipality was the 439th most populous municipality in Norway with a population of about 1,991. The municipality's population density was 432.8 inhabitants per square kilometre (1,121/sq mi) and its population had increased by 27.3% over the previous 10-year period.

==== Municipal council ====
The municipal council (Bystyre) of Brønnøysund Municipality was made up of 21 representatives that were elected to four-year terms. The tables below show the historical composition of the council by political party.

Brønnøysund bystyre 1959–1963
Party name (in Norwegian)	Number of representatives
Labour Party (Arbeiderpartiet)	10
Conservative Party (Høyre)	4
Christian Democratic Party (Kristelig Folkeparti)	1
Liberal Party (Venstre)	2
Local List(s) (Lokale lister)	4
Total number of members:	21
Note: On 1 January 1964, the town of Brønnøysund became part of Brønnøy Municipality.

Brønnøysund bystyre 1955–1959
Party name (in Norwegian)	Number of representatives
Labour Party (Arbeiderpartiet)	8
Conservative Party (Høyre)	4
Liberal Party (Venstre)	3
Local List(s) (Lokale lister)	6
Total number of members:	21

Brønnøysund bystyre 1951–1955
Party name (in Norwegian)	Number of representatives
Labour Party (Arbeiderpartiet)	8
Joint List(s) of Non-Socialist Parties (Borgerlige Felleslister)	9
Local List(s) (Lokale lister)	3
Total number of members:	20

Brønnøysund bystyre 1947–1951
Party name (in Norwegian)	Number of representatives
Labour Party (Arbeiderpartiet)	7
Joint List(s) of Non-Socialist Parties (Borgerlige Felleslister)	12
Local List(s) (Lokale lister)	1
Total number of members:	20

Brønnøysund bystyre 1945–1947
Party name (in Norwegian)	Number of representatives
Labour Party (Arbeiderpartiet)	8
Joint List(s) of Non-Socialist Parties (Borgerlige Felleslister)	7
Local List(s) (Lokale lister)	5
Total number of members:	20

Brønnøysund bystyre 1937–1941*
Party name (in Norwegian)	Number of representatives
Labour Party (Arbeiderpartiet)	6
Joint List(s) of Non-Socialist Parties (Borgerlige Felleslister)	10
Local List(s) (Lokale lister)	4
Total number of members:	20
Note: Due to the German occupation of Norway during World War II, no elections were held for new municipal councils until after the war ended in 1945.

Brønnøysund bystyre 1935–1937
Party name (in Norwegian)	Number of representatives
Labour Party (Arbeiderpartiet)	7
Free-minded People's Party (Frisinnede Folkeparti)	5
Joint List(s) of Non-Socialist Parties (Borgerlige Felleslister)	8
Total number of members:	20

==== Mayors ====
The mayor (Norwegian: ordfører) of Brønnøysund Municipality was the political leader of the town-municipality and the chairperson of the municipal council. Here is a list of people who held this position:

- 1923–1928: Einar Olaussen Høvding (H)
- 1929–1931: Carl Waldemar Gotaas (H)
- 1932–1937: Karl Ludvik Nøstvik (FV)
- 1938–1939: Einar Høvding (LL)
- 1940–1945: Sigurd Monrad Gladsø (NS)
- 1945–1945: Christian Aasgaard (LL)
- 1946–1948: Sverre G. Stolpe (Ap)
- 1948–1951: Halvdan Skogheim (Ap)
- 1952–1952: Sigurd Monrad Gladsø (LL)
- 1953–1953: Lauritz Johan Riise (H)
- 1954–1955: Sigurd Monrad Gladsø (LL)
- 1956–1959: Lauritz Johan Riise (H)
- 1960–1963: Sigurd Monrad Gladsø (LL)

== Economy ==
The town is the administrative and commercial centre of Brønnøy Municipality.

In recent years, Brønnøysund has managed to create a certain economic growth. Fjord Seafood originated here, as well as the largest limestone mine in Northern Europe and the highest foodstuff production in Northern Norway are examples of entrepreneurship and economy in this region. Modern agriculture, hydroponics, the large TTS transport corporation, wood processing and tourism are the main driving industries.

One of Norway's four large ferry shipping companies, Torghatten is based in Brønnøysund, along with its parents company Nordic Ferry Infrastructure.

== Transportation ==
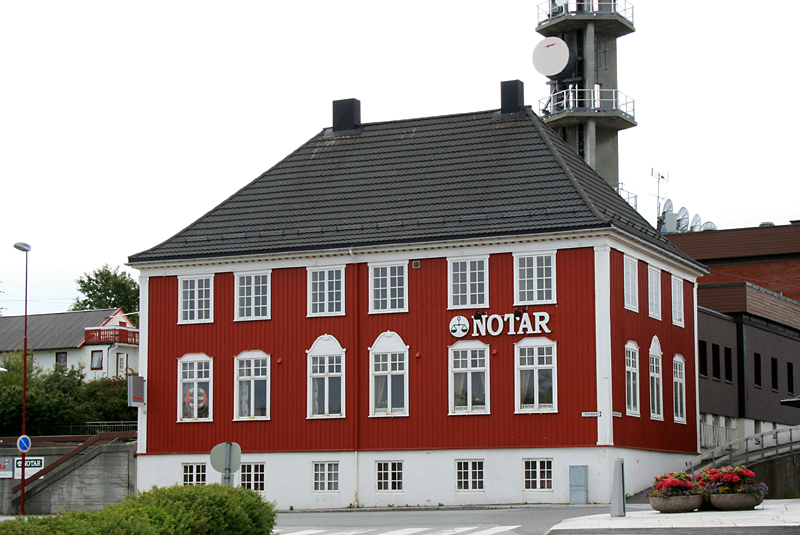
This building is known as Telegrafen as it originally housed the telegraph in town.

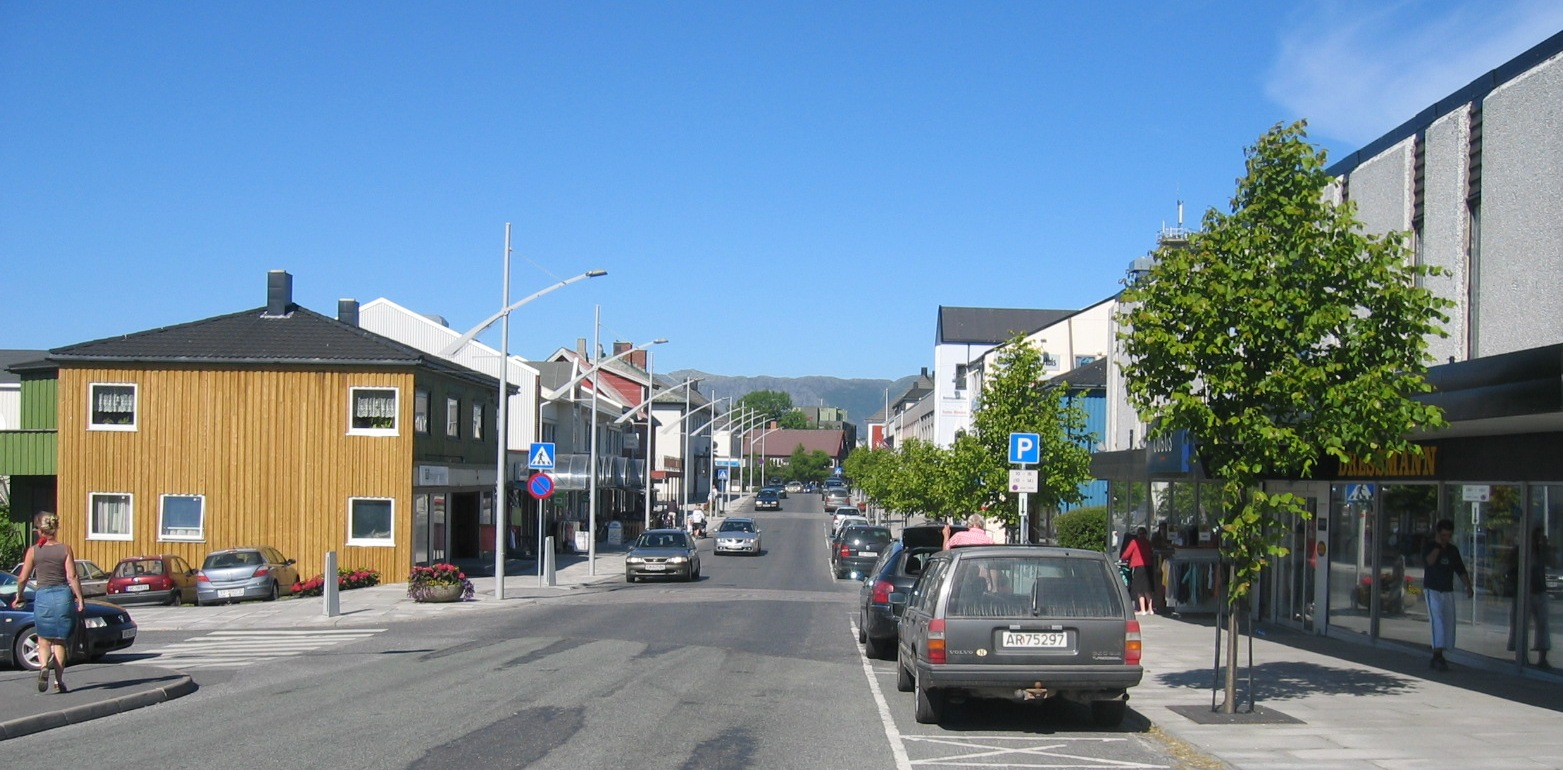
Brønnøysund main street

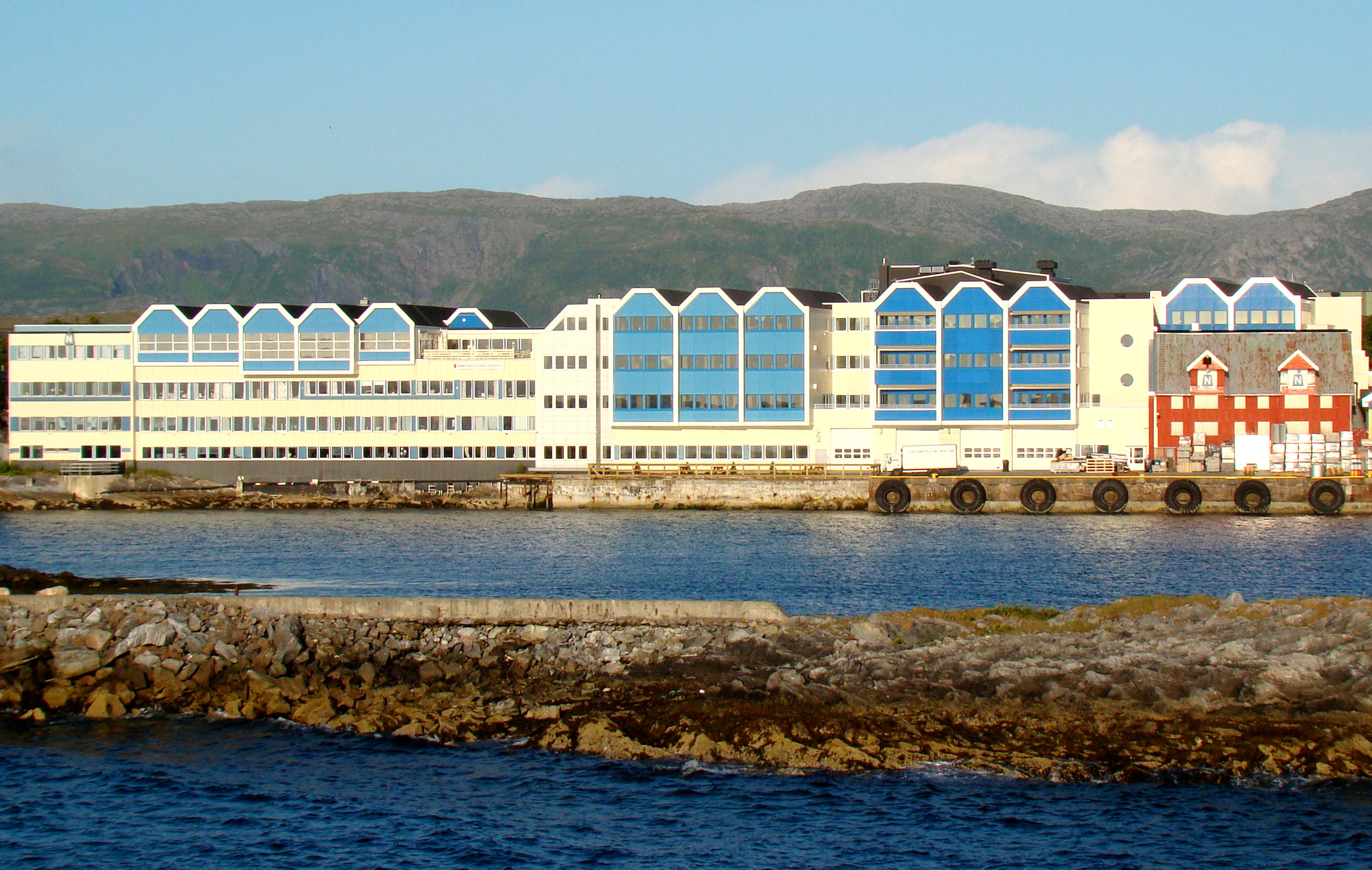
Brønnøysund Register Centre buildings

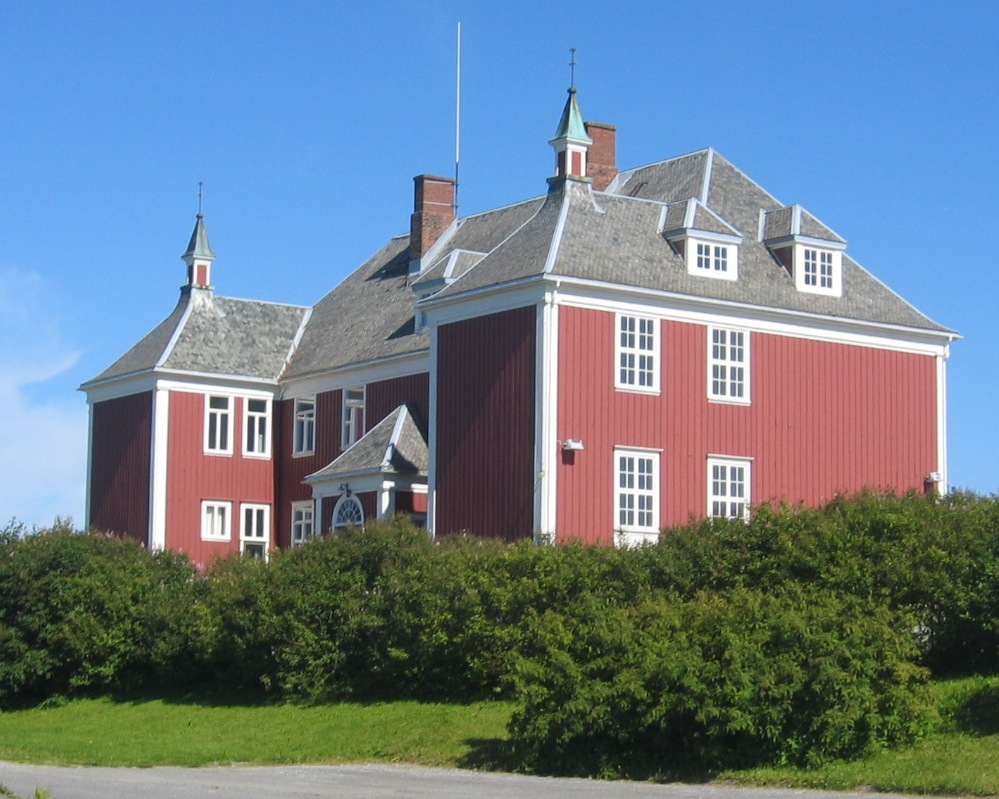
Tårnskolen, the old school.

Brønnøysund has daily visits by the Hurtigruten (Coastal Express), northbound at night and southbound in the afternoon. It has its own airport, Brønnøysund Airport, Brønnøy, and a direct eastbound connection to the European route E6 highway.

Throughout Norway, the town is known as the location of the Brønnøysund Register Centre, in which the new e-government portal Altinn is the newest addition. Torghatten ASA has its headquarters in Brønnøysund.

=== Airport ===
Brønnøysund Airport, Brønnøy is located only about 2 kilometres (1.2 mi) from the town centre, and is a vital communications link not only for the town, but also for a large region surrounding the town.

The airport opened in 1968, providing modern and much needed, time-effective transportation to the region, and making it possible to reach both the capital and medical services within an acceptable timeframe.

In May 2010, the direct flight to Oslo was launched, and since April 2011 there are three daily departures for Oslo with a 50-seat plane. There are also connections to Sandnessjøen, Mo i Rana, Rørvik, Trondheim, and Bodø.

It is served by Norway's oldest airline, Widerøe. It is also base for some of the offshore helicopter services, making it possible to exploit the vast petroleum resources offshore.

== Culture ==
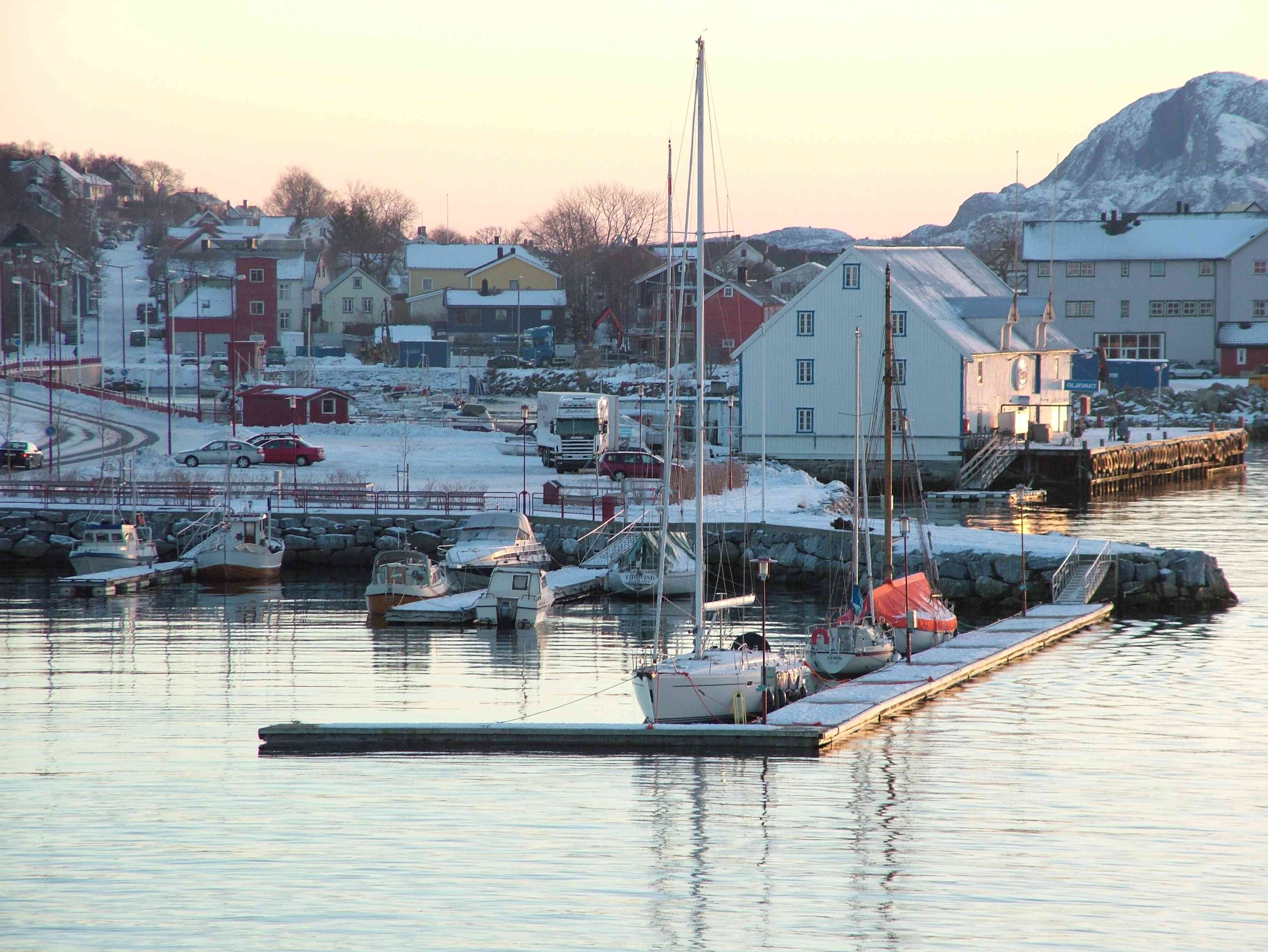
Southern part of Brønnøysund

The town has a number of cultural institutions:

- Brønnøysund Musikkorps (wind band)
- Brønnøysund Mannskor (male choir)
- Kor i Øyan (mixed choir)

The NRK series Himmelblå, a franchise of the British Two Thousand Acres of Sky, was filmed in part in Brønnøysund and on various locations nearby. The local Brønnøy Church serves the town of Brønnøysund.

== Geography ==
Brønnøysund sits on a narrow peninsula on the mainland surrounded by islands and water. The town is connected to the island Torget by the Brønnøysund Bridge.

=== Climate ===
Brønnøysund has a temperate oceanic climate with mild winters (Koppen Cfb) considering the northerly location, and a long frost-free season. 9 of the 12 monthly all-time lows are from 1940 or older; 3 from before 1900. The coldest low after 2000 is −14.8 °C (5.4 °F) from February 2010. The all-time low −18.4 °C (−1.1 °F) was recorded in February 1966, and the all-time high 32.1 °C (89.8 °F) was set on July 27, 2019.

Climate data for Brønnøysund Airport 1991-2020 (9 m, precipitation 1961-90, extremes 1873-2024 includes earlier stations)
Month	Jan	Feb	Mar	Apr	May	Jun	Jul	Aug	Sep	Oct	Nov	Dec	Year
Record high °C (°F)	10.2 (50.4)	11.2 (52.2)	14.7 (58.5)	21.1 (70.0)	27.8 (82.0)	30.3 (86.5)	32.1 (89.8)	30.1 (86.2)	24.6 (76.3)	20.3 (68.5)	17.6 (63.7)	12.2 (54.0)	32.1 (89.8)
Mean daily maximum °C (°F)	2 (36)	2 (36)	4 (39)	8 (46)	12 (54)	15 (59)	18 (64)	17 (63)	14 (57)	9 (48)	6 (43)	4 (39)	9 (49)
Daily mean °C (°F)	1.1 (34.0)	0.4 (32.7)	1.4 (34.5)	4.7 (40.5)	8.1 (46.6)	11.2 (52.2)	14.3 (57.7)	14 (57)	11.1 (52.0)	6.8 (44.2)	4 (39)	1.9 (35.4)	6.6 (43.8)
Mean daily minimum °C (°F)	0 (32)	−1 (30)	−1 (30)	2 (36)	5 (41)	9 (48)	12 (54)	12 (54)	9 (48)	5 (41)	2 (36)	1 (34)	5 (40)
Record low °C (°F)	−17.1 (1.2)	−18.4 (−1.1)	−15.5 (4.1)	−10.1 (13.8)	−5 (23)	0 (32)	1 (34)	1.1 (34.0)	−4.4 (24.1)	−5.2 (22.6)	−11.3 (11.7)	−18.2 (−0.8)	−18.4 (−1.1)
Average precipitation mm (inches)	138 (5.4)	102 (4.0)	114 (4.5)	97 (3.8)	66 (2.6)	83 (3.3)	123 (4.8)	113 (4.4)	180 (7.1)	192 (7.6)	145 (5.7)	157 (6.2)	1,510 (59.4)
Source 1: yr.no - Meteorologisk Institutt
Source 2: Weatheronline.co.uk

== In popular culture ==
- The 2015 documentary film Sangen reddet mitt liv ("the song saved my life") documents the farewell to Igor Trapitsin and the other Soviet ex-POWs from the harbour at Brønnøysund.

== See also ==
- List of former municipalities of Norway
