= Tjøtta (disambiguation) =

Tjøtta may refer to:

== People ==
- Jacqueline Naze Tjøtta, a French-born mathematician who settled in Norway and became the first female mathematical sciences professor in Norway
- Hárek of Tjøtta, a Norwegian farmer and local chieftain

== Places ==
- Tjøtta, a village in Alstahaug Municipality in Nordland county, Norway
- Tjøtta Municipality, a former municipality in Nordland county, Norway
- Tjøtta (island), an island within Alstahaug Municipality in Nordland county, Norway
- Tjøtta Church, a church in Alstahaug Municipality in Nordland county, Norway
- Tjøtta International War Cemetery, a war cemetery on the island of Tjøtta in Nordland county, Norway
- Tjøtta Russian War Cemetery, a war cemetery on the island of Tjøtta in Nordland county, Norway
