= Velfjord =

Velfjord may refer to:

== Places ==
- Velfjord Municipality, a former municipality in Nordland county, Norway
- Velfjorden, a fjord in Brønnøy Municipality and Vevelstad Municipality in Nordland county, Norway
- Velfjord Church, a church in Brønnøy Municipality in Nordland county, Norway
