= Vevelstad =

Vevelstad may refer to:

== Places ==
- Vevelstad Municipality, a municipality in Nordland county, Norway
- Vevelstad Church, a church in Vevelstad Municipality in Nordland county, Norway
- Forvika (or Vevelstad), a village within Vevelstad Municipality in Nordland county, Norway
- Vevelstad, Akershus, a village in Nordre Follo Municipality in Akershus county, Norway
- Vevelstad Station, a railway station in Nordre Follo Municipality in Akershus county, Norway
