= Hamnøya, Vevelstad =

Island in Nordland, Norway

Hamnøya
- Interactive map of Hamnøya

Geography
- Location: Nordland, Norway
- Coordinates: 65.6769°N 12.34976°E
- Area: 16.6 km^{2} (6.4 sq mi)

Administration
- Norway
- County: Nordland
- Municipality: Vevelstad Municipality

Demographics
- Population: 35 (2021)

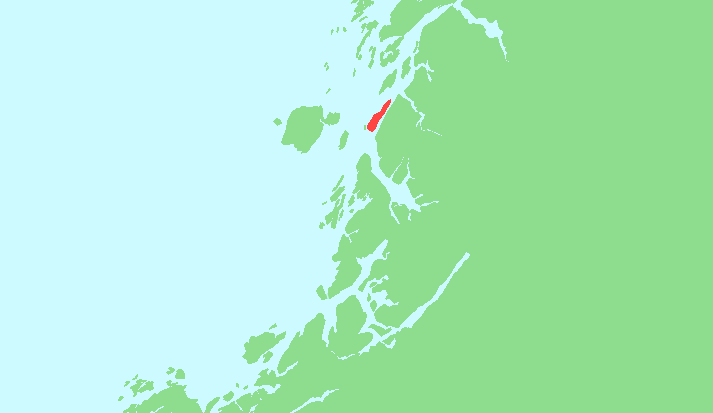
Locator map of Hamnøya, Nordland, Norway

Hamnøya is an island in Vevelstad Municipality in Nordland county, Norway. The 16.6-square-kilometre (6.4 sq mi) island lies about 500 to 700 metres (0.3 to 0.4 mi) off shore from the mainland of the municipality, separated by the Vevelstadsundet strait. The island is only accessible by boat and in 2021 it had 35 permanent residents living on the island.

The southern part of the island is rocky, but relatively low. The northern part has a well-developed beach area. There is a county road that crosses the island from the south (Hamnsundet) to the north (Vågsodden) with a car ferry from Vågsodden to Forvik on the mainland and also to Tjøtta in Alstahaug Municipality.

In the middle of the island at Hesstun, remains of settlements inhabited from the Stone Age to the Early Iron Age have been found.

== See also ==
- List of islands of Norway
