= Nordland County Municipality =

Nordland County Municipality Nordland fylkeskommune
- County
- Coat of arms

- Location in Norway
- Coordinates: 67.280159°N 14.376849°E
- Country: Norway
- Administrative center: Bodø

Government
  - County mayor: Kari Anne Bøkestad Andreassen
  - Chairman of Cabinet: Tomas Norvoll
- ISO 3166 code: NO-18
- Employees: 3,500
- Schools: 16
- Pupils: 9,500
- Transit authority: None
- Roads: 4,113 km (2,556 mi)
- Website: www.nfk.no

Nordland County Municipality (Norwegian: Nordland fylkeskommune) is the regional governing administration of Nordland county in Norway. The main responsibilities of the county municipality includes the running of 16 upper secondary schools, with 9,500 pupils. It administers the county roads, public transport, dental care, culture, and cultural heritage. The administrative centre of the county is the town of Bodø.

== County government ==
The county municipality's most important tasks include secondary education, recreation (sports and outdoor life), and cultural heritage. The county municipality is also responsible for all county roads (including ferry operations) and public transport (including school busses). The county municipality has further responsibility for regional land-use planning, business development, power production, and environmental management. The county also has responsibility for providing dental health services (in 2002, responsibility for hospitals and public medicine was transferred from the counties to the new regional health authorities).

=== County mayor ===
Since 1963, the County mayor (Norwegian: fylkesordfører) of Nordland is the political leader of the county and the chairperson of the county council. Prior to 1963, the County governor led the council which was made up of all of the mayors of the rural municipalities within the county. Here is a list of people who have held this position:

- 1963-1963: Håkon O. Wika (Ap)
- 1964–1967: Hilmar Hansen (Ap)
- 1968–1971: Henry Forsaa (Ap)
- 1971-1971: Petter Carl Reinsnes (Ap)
- 1971-1975: Ottar Vollan (Ap)
- 1976–1983: Odd Grønmo (KrF)
- 1984–1995: Sigbjørn Eriksen (Ap)
- 1995–1999: Alf Ivar Samuelsen (Sp)
- 1999–2007: Jon Tørset (Sp)
- 2007–2011: Mariette Korsrud (Ap)
- 2011–2019: Sonja Alice Steen (Ap)
- 2019–2023: Kari Anne Bøkestad Andreassen (Sp)
- 2023-2027: Eivind Holst (H)

=== County council ===
The county council (Norwegian: Fylkestinget) is made up of 45 representatives that are elected by direct election by all legal residents every fourth year. The council essentially acts as a Parliament or legislative body for the county. The county council typically meets about six times a year. The council follows a parliamentary system and has a county cabinet (Norwegian: Fylkesrådet) which functions as the head of the executive branch of the county municipality's duties. The cabinet is led by the Chairman of the County Cabinet (fylkesrådsleder). The head if the administration is the County Executive (fylkesrådmann). The tables below show the current and historical composition of the council by political party.

Nordland fylkesting 2023–2027
Party name (in Norwegian)	Number of representatives
Labour Party (Arbeiderpartiet)	11
Progress Party (Fremskrittspartiet)	6
Green Party (Miljøpartiet De Grønne)	1
Conservative Party (Høyre)	11
Industry and Business Party (Industri‑ og Næringspartiet)	2
Christian Democratic Party (Kristelig Folkeparti)	1
Red Party (Rødt)	3
Centre Party (Senterpartiet)	5
Socialist Left Party (Sosialistisk Venstreparti)	4
Liberal Party (Venstre)	1
Total number of members:	45

Nordland fylkesting 2019–2023
Party name (in Norwegian)	Number of representatives
Labour Party (Arbeiderpartiet)	12
Progress Party (Fremskrittspartiet)	4
Green Party (Miljøpartiet De Grønne)	2
Conservative Party (Høyre)	7
Christian Democratic Party (Kristelig Folkeparti)	1
Red Party (Rødt)	3
Centre Party (Senterpartiet)	12
Socialist Left Party (Sosialistisk Venstreparti)	3
Liberal Party (Venstre)	1
Total number of members:	45
Note:

Nordland fylkesting 2015–2019
Party name (in Norwegian)	Number of representatives
Labour Party (Arbeiderpartiet)	17
Progress Party (Fremskrittspartiet)	5
Green Party (Miljøpartiet De Grønne)	1
Conservative Party (Høyre)	9
Christian Democratic Party (Kristelig Folkeparti)	2
Red Party (Rødt)	2
Centre Party (Senterpartiet)	4
Socialist Left Party (Sosialistisk Venstreparti)	2
Liberal Party (Venstre)	2
Independent list (Uavhengig liste)	1
Total number of members:	45

Nordland fylkesting 2011–2015
Party name (in Norwegian)	Number of representatives
Labour Party (Arbeiderpartiet)	20
Progress Party (Fremskrittspartiet)	8
Conservative Party (Høyre)	12
Christian Democratic Party (Kristelig Folkeparti)	2
Red Party (Rødt)	2
Centre Party (Senterpartiet)	4
Socialist Left Party (Sosialistisk Venstreparti)	3
Liberal Party (Venstre)	2
Total number of members:	53

Nordland fylkesting 2007–2011
Party name (in Norwegian)	Number of representatives
Labour Party (Arbeiderpartiet)	19
Progress Party (Fremskrittspartiet)	11
Conservative Party (Høyre)	6
Christian Democratic Party (Kristelig Folkeparti)	2
Coastal Party (Kystpartiet)	1
Red Party (Rødt)	2
Centre Party (Senterpartiet)	6
Socialist Left Party (Sosialistisk Venstreparti)	4
Liberal Party (Venstre)	2
Total number of members:	53

Nordland fylkesting 2003–2007
Party name (in Norwegian)	Number of representatives
Labour Party (Arbeiderpartiet)	17
Progress Party (Fremskrittspartiet)	8
Conservative Party (Høyre)	6
Christian Democratic Party (Kristelig Folkeparti)	2
Coastal Party (Kystpartiet)	2
Red Electoral Alliance (Rød Valgallianse)	1
Centre Party (Senterpartiet)	6
Socialist Left Party (Sosialistisk Venstreparti)	9
Liberal Party (Venstre)	2
Total number of members:	53

Nordland fylkesting 1999–2003
Party name (in Norwegian)	Number of representatives
Labour Party (Arbeiderpartiet)	17
Progress Party (Fremskrittspartiet)	6
Conservative Party (Høyre)	8
Christian Democratic Party (Kristelig Folkeparti)	4
Coastal Party (Kystpartiet)	2
Red Electoral Alliance (Rød Valgallianse)	1
Centre Party (Senterpartiet)	7
Socialist Left Party (Sosialistisk Venstreparti)	6
Liberal Party (Venstre)	2
Total number of members:	53

Nordland fylkesting 1995–1999
Party name (in Norwegian)	Number of representatives
Labour Party (Arbeiderpartiet)	18
Progress Party (Fremskrittspartiet)	4
Conservative Party (Høyre)	8
Christian Democratic Party (Kristelig Folkeparti)	3
Red Electoral Alliance (Rød Valgallianse)	1
Centre Party (Senterpartiet)	9
Socialist Left Party (Sosialistisk Venstreparti)	5
Liberal Party (Venstre)	4
Nordland Health List (Nordland helseliste)	1
Total number of members:	53

Nordland fylkesting 1991–1995
Party name (in Norwegian)	Number of representatives
Labour Party (Arbeiderpartiet)	18
Progress Party (Fremskrittspartiet)	2
Conservative Party (Høyre)	10
Christian Democratic Party (Kristelig Folkeparti)	3
Red Electoral Alliance (Rød Valgallianse)	1
Centre Party (Senterpartiet)	7
Socialist Left Party (Sosialistisk Venstreparti)	9
Liberal Party (Venstre)	3
Total number of members:	53

Nordland fylkesting 1987–1991
Party name (in Norwegian)	Number of representatives
Labour Party (Arbeiderpartiet)	30
Progress Party (Fremskrittspartiet)	5
Conservative Party (Høyre)	15
Christian Democratic Party (Kristelig Folkeparti)	4
Red Electoral Alliance (Rød Valgallianse)	1
Centre Party (Senterpartiet)	5
Socialist Left Party (Sosialistisk Venstreparti)	7
Liberal Party (Venstre)	4
Total number of members:	71

Nordland fylkesting 1983–1987
Party name (in Norwegian)	Number of representatives
Labour Party (Arbeiderpartiet)	31
Progress Party (Fremskrittspartiet)	2
Conservative Party (Høyre)	16
Communist Party (Kommunistiske Parti)	1
Christian Democratic Party (Kristelig Folkeparti)	5
Red Electoral Alliance (Rød Valgallianse)	1
Centre Party (Senterpartiet)	5
Socialist Left Party (Sosialistisk Venstreparti)	6
Liberal Party (Venstre)	4
Total number of members:	71

Nordland fylkesting 1979–1983
Party name (in Norwegian)	Number of representatives
Labour Party (Arbeiderpartiet)	28
Progress Party (Fremskrittspartiet)	1
Conservative Party (Høyre)	18
Communist Party (Kommunistiske Parti)	1
Christian Democratic Party (Kristelig Folkeparti)	7
Red Electoral Alliance (Rød Valgallianse)	1
Centre Party (Senterpartiet)	7
Socialist Left Party (Sosialistisk Venstreparti)	4
Liberal Party (Venstre)	4
Total number of members:	71

Nordland fylkesting 1975–1979
Party name (in Norwegian)	Number of representatives
Labour Party (Arbeiderpartiet)	30
Anders Lange's Party (Anders Langes parti)	1
Conservative Party (Høyre)	12
Christian Democratic Party (Kristelig Folkeparti)	8
New People's Party (Nye Folkepartiet)	4
Centre Party (Senterpartiet)	10
Socialist Left Party (Sosialistisk Venstreparti)	5
Liberal Party (Venstre)	4
Total number of members:	71
Note: Prior to this election, the county councils were not directly elected. Instead, members were chosen by each municipal council within the county - oftentimes it was the municipal mayors who were selected to be on the county council.
