= Grønmo =

Grønmo is a surname. Notable people with the surname include:

- Odd Grønmo (1922–2012), Norwegian politician
- Sigmund Grønmo (born 1947), Norwegian sociologist
