= Hommelstø =

Village in Brønnøy Municipality, Norway

- Village
- Interactive map of Hommelstø
- Location within Nordland Location within Norway
- Coordinates: 65.4074°N 12.5519°E
- Country: Norway
- Region: Northern Norway
- County: Nordland
- District: Helgeland
- Municipality: Brønnøy Municipality

Area
  - Total: 0.45 km^{2} (0.17 sq mi)
- Elevation: 5 m (16 ft)

Population (2017)
  - Total: 306
  - Density: 680/km^{2} (1,800/sq mi)
- Time zone: UTC+01:00 (CET)
  - Summer (DST): UTC+02:00 (CEST)
- Post Code: 8960 Hommelstø

Hommelstø is a village in Brønnøy Municipality in Nordland county, Norway. The village is located on the shore of an arm of the Velfjorden about 30 kilometres (19 mi) southeast of the town of Brønnøysund and about 30 kilometres (19 mi) north of the village of Lande.

The 0.45-square-kilometre (110-acre) village had a population (2017) of 306 and a population density of 680 inhabitants per square kilometre (1,800/sq mi). Since 2017, the population and area data for this village area has not been separately tracked by Statistics Norway.

Nøstvik Church is located about 1.5 kilometres (0.93 mi) west of the center of Hommelstø. From 1875-1964, Hommelstø was the administrative centre of the old Velfjord Municipality.
