= Sigbjørn Eriksen =

Norwegian politician (1936–2021)

Sigbjørn Eriksen (21 March 1936 – 30 October 2021) was a Norwegian politician for the Labour Party.

== Life and career ==
Eriksen was a member of the municipal council of Rana Municipality from 1964 to 1975, serving as deputy mayor from 1972 to 1975. From 1964 to 1995 he was a member of Nordland county council, from 1972 to 1975 serving as deputy county mayor, and from 1984 to 1995 serving as county mayor.

In 1996 he started working with the relations between Nordland County Municipality and Russia. He has been a board member of Nordlandskraft, and interim board chairman of Barents Institute. He resides in Bodø. Eriksen died on 30 October 2021, at the age of 85.

Political offices
Preceded by Odd Grønmo	County mayor of Nordland; 1984–1995	Succeeded by Alf Ivar Samuelsen
