= Velfjord Municipality =

Former municipality in Nordland, Norway

Velfjord Municipality Velfjord herred
- Former municipality
- Velfjorden herred (historic name)
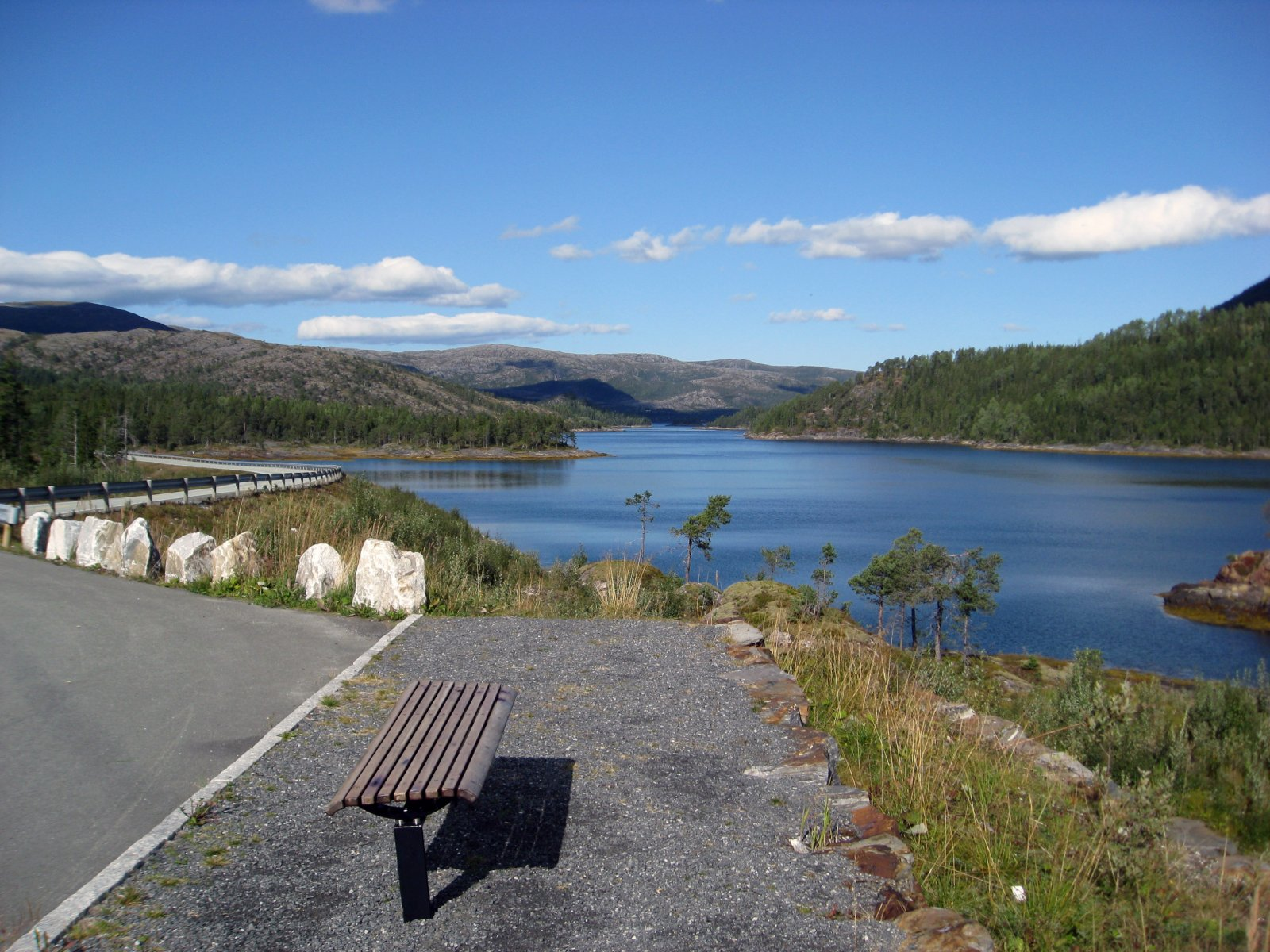
- View of the Sørfjorden arm of the Velfjorden

- Nordland within Norway

- Velfjord within Nordland
- Coordinates: 65°24′17″N 12°31′19″E
- Country: Norway
- County: Nordland
- District: Helgeland
- Established: 1 Oct 1875
  - Preceded by: Brønnøy Municipality
- Disestablished: 1 Jan 1964
  - Succeeded by: Brønnøy Municipality
- Administrative centre: Hommelstø

Area (upon dissolution)
  - Total: 600.2 km^{2} (231.7 sq mi)
  - Rank: #165 in Norway
- Highest elevation: 1,224.86 m (4,018.6 ft)

Population (1963)
  - Total: 1,405
  - Rank: #551 in Norway
  - Density: 2.3/km^{2} (6.0/sq mi)
  - Change (10 years): ▼ −17.4%
- Demonym: Velfjording

Official language
  - Norwegian form: Neutral
- Time zone: UTC+01:00 (CET)
  - Summer (DST): UTC+02:00 (CEST)
- ISO 3166 code: NO-1813

Velfjord is a former municipality in Nordland county, Norway. The 600-square-kilometre (230 sq mi) municipality existed from 1875 until its dissolution in 1964. Velfjord Municipality was centered around the Velfjorden in what is now Brønnøy Municipality. Most of the municipality is located on the mainland, but it also includes nearly 100 small islands, islet, and skjerries. The administrative centre was the village of Hommelstø at the innermost part of the fjord. Velfjord Church, just west of Hommelstø, was the main church for the municipality.

Prior to its dissolution in 1963, the 600-square-kilometre (230 sq mi) municipality was the 165th largest by area out of the 689 municipalities in Norway. Velfjord Municipality was the 551st most populous municipality in Norway with a population of about 1,405. The municipality's population density was 2.3 inhabitants per square kilometre (6.0/sq mi) and its population had decreased by 17.4% over the previous 10-year period.

== General information ==
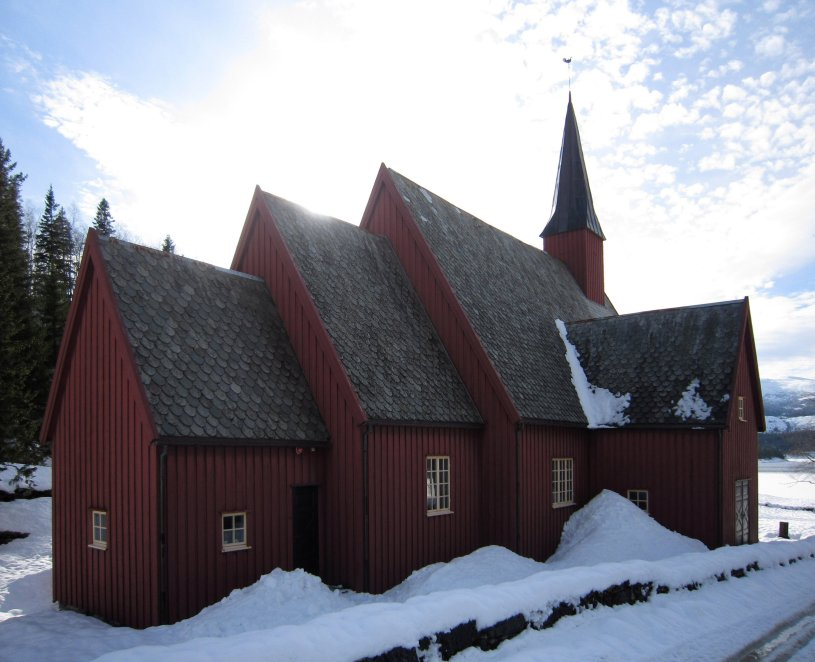
Velfjord Church

The municipality of Velfjord was created on 1 October 1875 when the large Brønnøy Municipality was divided into two municipalities: Brønnøy Municipality (in the west) and Velfjord Municipality (in the east). Initially, Velfjord Municipality had a population of 1,162. During the 1960s, there were many municipal mergers across Norway due to the work of the Schei Committee. On 1 January 1964, Velfjord Municipality (population: 1,380) was merged with the town of Brønnøysund (population: 2,064), Sømna Municipality (population: 2,347), Brønnøy Municipality (population: 2,635), and the Lande area of Bindal Municipality to form a new, enlarged Brønnøy Municipality.

=== Name ===
The municipality is named after the local Velfjorden which is a central geographical feature for the municipality. The first element is likely the old name for the fjord velli which has an unknown meaning. The last element is fjord which means "fjord". Historically, the name of the municipality was spelled Velfjorden. On 6 January 1908, a royal resolution changed the spelling of the name of the municipality to Velfjord.

=== Churches ===
The Church of Norway had one parish (sokn) within Velfjord Municipality. At the time of the municipal dissolution, it was part of the Velfjord prestegjeld and the Sør-Helgeland prosti (deanery) in the Diocese of Sør-Hålogaland.

Churches in Velfjord Municipality
Parish (sokn)	Church name	Location of the church	Year built
Velfjord	Velfjord Church	Hommelstø	1674

== Geography ==
The highest point in the municipality was the 1,224.86-metre (4,018.6 ft) tall mountain Breivasstinden on the border with Grane Municipality and Vefsn Municipality.

== Government ==
While it existed, Velfjord Municipality was responsible for primary education (through 10th grade), outpatient health services, senior citizen services, welfare and other social services, zoning, economic development, and municipal roads and utilities. The municipality was governed by a municipal council of directly elected representatives. The mayor was indirectly elected by a vote of the municipal council. The municipality was under the jurisdiction of the Hålogaland Court of Appeal.

=== Municipal council ===
The municipal council (Herredsstyre) of Velfjord Municipality was made up of 13 representatives that were elected to four year terms. The tables below show the historical composition of the council by political party.

Velfjord herredsstyre 1959–1963
Party name (in Norwegian)	Number of representatives
Labour Party (Arbeiderpartiet)	5
Communist Party (Kommunistiske Parti)	1
Joint List(s) of Non-Socialist Parties (Borgerlige Felleslister)	2
Local List(s) (Lokale lister)	5
Total number of members:	13
Note: On 1 January 1964, Velfjord Municipality became part of Brønnøy Municipality.

Velfjord herredsstyre 1955–1959
Party name (in Norwegian)	Number of representatives
Labour Party (Arbeiderpartiet)	6
Communist Party (Kommunistiske Parti)	1
Joint List(s) of Non-Socialist Parties (Borgerlige Felleslister)	2
Local List(s) (Lokale lister)	4
Total number of members:	13

Velfjord herredsstyre 1951–1955
Party name (in Norwegian)	Number of representatives
Labour Party (Arbeiderpartiet)	6
Local List(s) (Lokale lister)	6
Total number of members:	12

Velfjord herredsstyre 1947–1951
Party name (in Norwegian)	Number of representatives
Local List(s) (Lokale lister)	12
Total number of members:	12

Velfjord herredsstyre 1945–1947
Party name (in Norwegian)	Number of representatives
Labour Party (Arbeiderpartiet)	5
Communist Party (Kommunistiske Parti)	3
Local List(s) (Lokale lister)	4
Total number of members:	12

Velfjord herredsstyre 1937–1941*
Party name (in Norwegian)	Number of representatives
Labour Party (Arbeiderpartiet)	8
Joint List(s) of Non-Socialist Parties (Borgerlige Felleslister)	4
Total number of members:	12
Note: Due to the German occupation of Norway during World War II, no elections were held for new municipal councils until after the war ended in 1945.

=== Mayors ===
The mayor (Norwegian: ordfører) of Velfjord Municipality was the political leader of the municipality and the chairperson of the municipal council. Here is a list of people who held this position:

- 1875–1882: Martinus Thomassen
- 1883–1886: Rasmus Christian Mohr
- 1887–1890: Jakob Nøstvik (V)
- 1891–1892: Søren Dahl
- 1893–1898: Salomon Nepaas
- 1899–1922: Andreas Fredriksen (V)
- 1923–1928: Einar Winther (LL)
- 1929–1931: Arne Rødli (Ap)
- 1932–1934: Knut Strompdal (V)
- 1935–1940: Gustav B. Skog (Ap)
- 1941–1944: Harald Strøm (NS)
- 1945–1945: Gustav B. Skog (Ap)
- 1946–1947: Sverre Bjørgan (Ap)
- 1948–1963: Gustav B. Skog (Ap)

== Notable people ==
- Kristine Andersen Vesterfjell (1910–1987), a Southern Sami reindeer herder and cultural advocate

== See also ==
- List of former municipalities of Norway
