= Forvika =

Village in Vevelstad Municipality, Norway

Forvik Forvika
- Village
- Interactive map of Forvik
- Location within Nordland Location within Norway
- Coordinates: 65.7153°N 12.4629°E
- Country: Norway
- Region: Northern Norway
- County: Nordland
- District: Helgeland
- Municipality: Vevelstad Municipality
- Elevation: 2 m (6.6 ft)
- Time zone: UTC+01:00 (CET)
  - Summer (DST): UTC+02:00 (CEST)
- Post Code: 8978 Vevelstad

Forvik or Forvika is the administrative centre of Vevelstad Municipality in Nordland county, Norway. The village of Forvik sits on the coastline along the Vevelstadsundet strait, just north of Vevelstad Church. Forvik is the southern terminus of the Tjøtta-Forvika-Hamnøya ferry line which is part of the Norwegian County Road 17.
