= MS Rigel =

Norwegian cargo ship, 1924–1944

Coordinates: 65°49′16″N 12°20′10″E

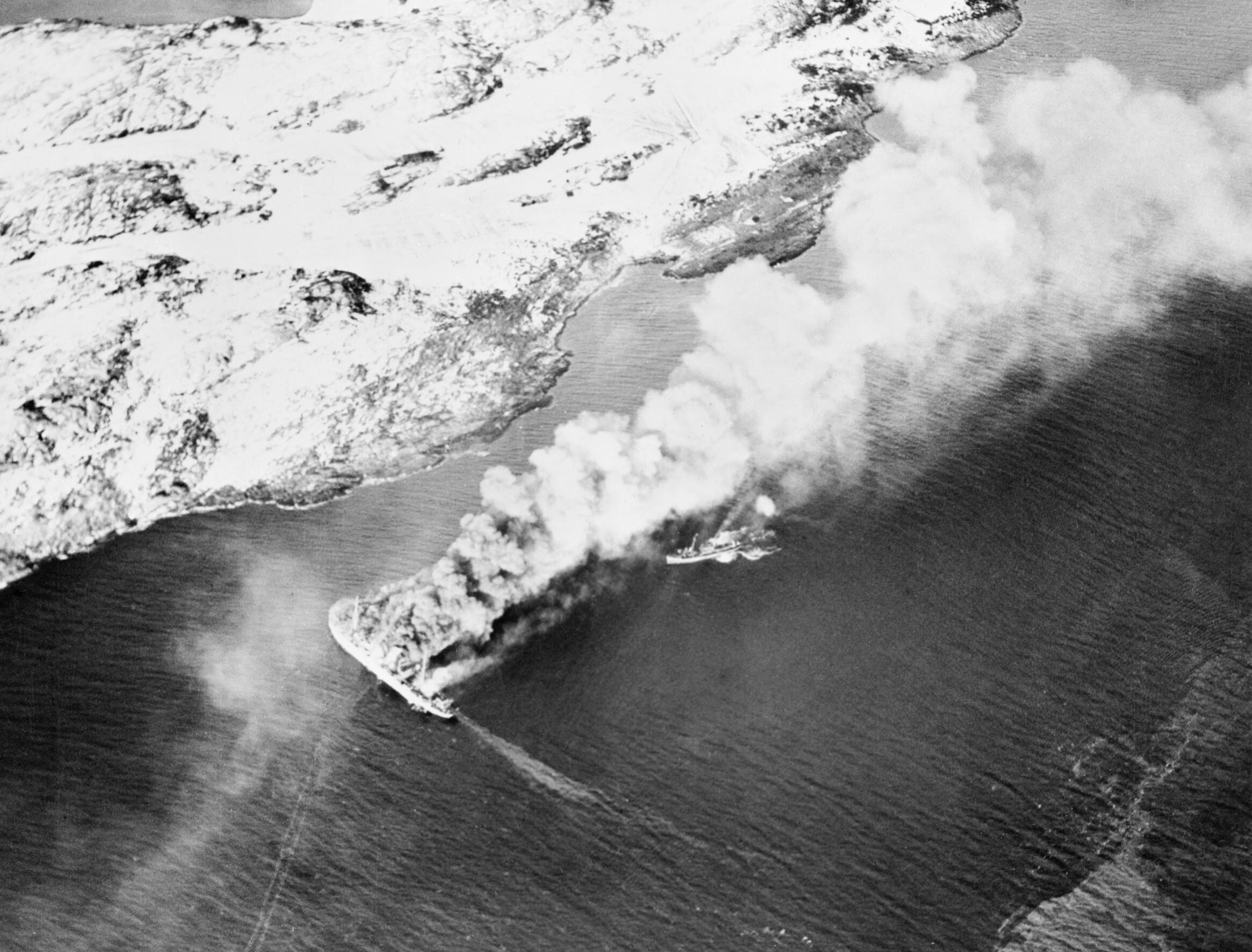
- Rigel (left) and an escort (right) under attack

History

Norway
- Name: MS Rigel
- Namesake: The star Rigel
- Owner: Bergen Steamship Company
- Builder: Burmeister & Wain, Copenhagen
- Yard number: 326
- Acquired: August 1924
- Fate: Sunk by aircraft, 27 November 1944

General characteristics
- Type: Cargo steamer
- Tonnage: 3,828 GRT; 6,785 DWT
- Length: 367 ft 6 in (112.01 m)
- Beam: 51 ft 6 in (15.70 m)
- Depth: 22 ft 6 in (6.86 m)
- Propulsion: 2 × 6-cylinder B&W diesel engines, 2,076 ihp (1,548 kW)
- Speed: 11 knots (20 km/h; 13 mph)

MS Rigel was a Norwegian vessel built in Copenhagen, Denmark, in 1924. The ship was used as a German prisoner of war (POW) transport during World War II, and was sunk by British Fleet Air Arm aircraft off Norway on 27 November 1944 with more than 2,500 dead, mostly Allied POWs.

== Ship history ==
Rigel (3,828 tons) was originally a motorship owned by the Bergen Steamship Company. The vessel was named after the brightest star in the Orion constellation. The ships had been requisitioned by the German occupation authorities in Norway in 1940 to transport Allied PoWs.

== Last voyage and sinking ==
According to Norwegian sources, Rigel, under the command of Captain Heinrich Rohde with a German crew, sailed under the German flag from Bjerkvik on 21 November 1944 carrying 951 PoWs and 114 guards. At Narvik a further 349 PoWs were loaded plus 95 German deserters and 8 Norwegian prisoners arrested by the German police. The ship then proceeded in convoy with some smaller vessels to Tømmerneset where 948 more PoWs were loaded into the cargo holds. Rigel called next at the port of Bodø.

When the ship left Bodø on 26 November Captain Rohde reported 2838 persons on board. There were 2,248 Soviet, Polish and Serbian prisoners of war with the 95 German deserters and 8 Norwegian prisoners. In addition there were 455 German soldiers and the normal ship's crew of 29 plus three coastal pilots. One of the pilots and one woman crew member were Norwegians.

The convoy, escorted by two small V-Boats of the Kriegsmarine, was discovered by a patrol from the aircraft carrier HMS Implacable on the morning of 27 November, which mistakenly identified Rigel as a troopship. The convoy was attacked by Supermarine Seafire fighters and Fairey Firefly dive-bombers from Implacable, which was taking part in Operation Provident. The attack took place between the islands of Rosøya and Tjøtta south of the port of Sandnessjøen in Nordland county.

After the attack the German captain grounded the badly damaged Rigel on the island of Rosøya, which probably saved the lives of the 267 survivors. The number of casualties is 2571, including seven Norwegians.

Also heavily damaged and grounded was the collier Korsnes, built in 1936 for the Bergen company Kr. Jebsen. There were six casualties on this ship, which was salvaged in 1946 and continued in use until 1965.

== Memorial ==
The wreck remained half-sunk until 1969, when it was demolished and the remains of the dead buried in the Tjøtta International War Cemetery on the island of Tjøtta. The cemetery was consecrated in 1970, in memory of those killed on the Rigel. All the graves are anonymous, but a memorial stone in the form of a cross has been erected on the site.

The Norwegian broadcaster NRK produced a short news video in 2004 to mark the 60th anniversary of the disaster, with an interview with one of the survivors, 83-year-old Asbjørn Schultz. Three weeks later, having told his story, Schultz died. The video contains some underwater footage of the wreck. In a radio broadcast in 1966 Schultz said that the convoy had come under attack at about 11.00 by about 40 aircraft. Many prisoners escaped from the ship only to drown while trying to reach land, he said.
