= Søre Vistvatnet =

Lake in Vevelstad Municipality, Norway

Søre Vistvatnet (Norwegian) Åarjel Væstanjaevrie (Southern Sami)
- Interactive map of the lake
- Location: Vevelstad Municipality, Nordland
- Coordinates: 65.5545°N 12.9839°E
- Basin countries: Norway
- Max. length: 2.1 kilometres (1.3 mi)
- Max. width: 1.2 kilometres (0.75 mi)
- Surface area: 2.3 km^{2} (0.89 sq mi)
- Shore length^{1}: 8.38 kilometres (5.21 mi)
- Surface elevation: 555 metres (1,821 ft)
- References: NVE
- ^{1} Shore length is not a well-defined measure.

Søre Vistvatnet (Norwegian) or Åarjel Væstanjaevrie (Southern Sami) is a lake that lies in Vevelstad Municipality in Nordland county, Norway. Perched at an elevation of 555 metres (1,821 ft), it has a total surface area of 2.3 square kilometres (0.89 sq mi). It lies within the periphery of the wild Lomsdal–Visten National Park. The lake is locally known as Væstanjaevrie.

The 8.38-kilometre (5.21 mi) long shoreline makes for a solitary trek. The lake lies in the southeastern part of the municipality.

== See also ==
- List of lakes in Norway
- Geography of Norway
