= Tjøtta Municipality =

Former municipality in Nordland, Norway

Tjøtta Municipality Tjøtta herred
- Former municipality
- Nordland within Norway

- Tjøtta within Nordland
- Coordinates: 65.8386°N 12.4542°E
- Country: Norway
- County: Nordland
- District: Helgeland
- Established: 1862
  - Preceded by: Alstahaug Municipality
- Disestablished: 1 January 1965
  - Succeeded by: Alstahaug Municipality and Vega Municipality
- Administrative centre: Tjøtta

Government
  - Mayor (1963–1965): Petter J. Liland (Ap)

Area (upon dissolution)
  - Total: 326.3 km^{2} (126.0 sq mi)
  - Rank: #262 in Norway
- Highest elevation: 755 m (2,477 ft)

Population (1964)
  - Total: 1,747
  - Rank: #423 in Norway
  - Density: 5.4/km^{2} (14/sq mi)
  - Change (10 years): ▼ −21%
- Demonym: Tjøttværing

Official language
  - Norwegian form: Neutral
- Time zone: UTC+01:00 (CET)
  - Summer (DST): UTC+02:00 (CEST)
- ISO 3166 code: NO-1817

Tjøtta is a former municipality in Nordland county, Norway. The 326-square-kilometre (126 sq mi) municipality existed from 1862 until its dissolution in 1965. The municipality was centered around the island of Tjøtta plus the mainland to the east and south as well as over 3000 islands, islets, and skerries to the west. The administrative centre of Tjøtta was the village of Tjøtta, located on the island of Tjøtta, where the Tjøtta Church is located.

Prior to its dissolution in 1965, the 326-square-kilometre (126 sq mi) municipality was the 262nd largest by area out of the 525 municipalities in Norway. Tjøtta Municipality was the 423rd most populous municipality in Norway with a population of about 1,747. The municipality's population density was 5.4 inhabitants per square kilometre (14/sq mi) and its population had decreased by 21% over the previous 10-year period.

== General information ==
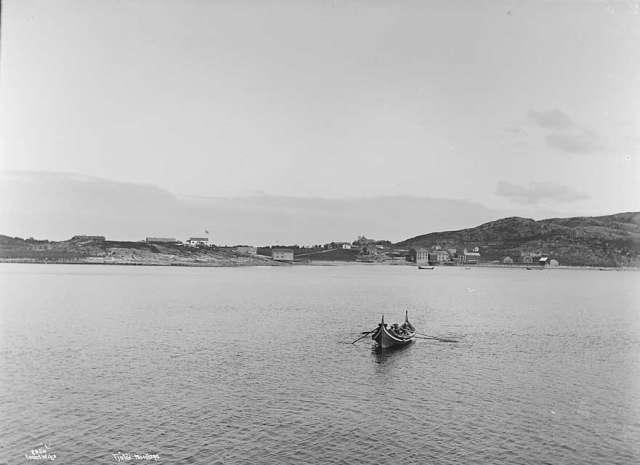
View of Tjøtta (c. 1890)

The municipality of Tjøtta was established in 1862 when it was separated from Alstahaug Municipality. Initially, Tjøtta Municipality had a population of 2,781. On 1 July 1917, the southeastern district of Tjøtta Municipality (population: 1,097) was separated to become the new Vevelstad Municipality, leaving Tjøtta with 2,287 inhabitants. On 1 July 1920 the Giskåen farm with 10 inhabitants was transferred to Vevelstad Municipality.

During the 1960s, there were many municipal mergers across Norway due to the work of the Schei Committee. On 1 January 1964, the part of Tjøtta Municipality located on the eastern part of the island of Alsta (population: 180) was incorporated into Leirfjord Municipality. On 1 January 1965, the Skogsholmen island area in western Tjøtta (population: 196) was incorporated into Vega Municipality. The rest of Tjøtta Municipality (population: 1,477) was merged with most of Alstahaug Municipality (population: 920) and the town of Sandnessjøen (population: 3,856) to form a new, larger Alstahaug Municipality.

=== Name ===
The municipality (originally the parish) is named after the old Tjøtta farm (Old Norse: Þjótta) since the first Tjøtta Church was built there. The name of the farm (and the island on which it is located) comes from the word þjó which is a noun describing the "upper part of a thigh". The name was likely used to refer to the shape of the island.

=== Churches ===
The Church of Norway had one parish (sokn) within Tjøtta Municipality. At the time of the municipal dissolution, it was part of the Tjøtta prestegjeld and the Nord-Helgeland prosti (deanery) in the Diocese of Sør-Hålogaland.

Churches in Tjøtta Municipality
| Parish (sokn) | Church name | Location of the church | Year built |
|---|---|---|---|
| Tjøtta | Tjøtta Church | Tjøtta | 1867 |
| Tjøtta | Skålvær Church | Skålværet | 1851 |

== Geography ==
The highest point in the municipality was the 755-metre (2,477 ft) tall mountain Valtinden, on the border with Vefsn Municipality.

== Government ==
While it existed, Tjøtta Municipality was responsible for primary education (through 10th grade), outpatient health services, senior citizen services, welfare and other social services, zoning, economic development, and municipal roads and utilities. The municipality was governed by a municipal council of directly elected representatives. The mayor was indirectly elected by a vote of the municipal council. The municipality was under the jurisdiction of the Hålogaland Court of Appeal.

=== Municipal council ===
The municipal council (Herredsstyre) of Tjøtta Municipality was made up of 17 representatives that were elected to four-year terms. The tables below show the historical composition of the council by political party.

Tjøtta herredsstyre 1963–1964
| Party name (in Norwegian) | Number of representatives |
|---|---|
| Labour Party (Arbeiderpartiet) | 8 |
| Liberal Party (Venstre) | 3 |
| List of workers, fishermen, and small farmholders (Arbeidere, fiskere, småbrukere liste) | 2 |
| Joint List(s) of Non-Socialist Parties (Borgerlige Felleslister) | 4 |
| Total number of members: | 17 |
Note: On 1 January 1965, Tjøtta Municipality was dissolved and its lands became part of Alstahaug Municipality and Vega Municipality.

Tjøtta herredsstyre 1959–1963
| Party name (in Norwegian) | Number of representatives |
|---|---|
| Labour Party (Arbeiderpartiet) | 6 |
| Conservative Party (Høyre) | 1 |
| Liberal Party (Venstre) | 2 |
| Local List(s) (Lokale lister) | 8 |
| Total number of members: | 17 |

Tjøtta herredsstyre 1955–1959
| Party name (in Norwegian) | Number of representatives |
|---|---|
| Labour Party (Arbeiderpartiet) | 5 |
| Liberal Party (Venstre) | 1 |
| Joint List(s) of Non-Socialist Parties (Borgerlige Felleslister) | 8 |
| Local List(s) (Lokale lister) | 3 |
| Total number of members: | 17 |

Tjøtta herredsstyre 1951–1955
| Party name (in Norwegian) | Number of representatives |
|---|---|
| Labour Party (Arbeiderpartiet) | 5 |
| Conservative Party (Høyre) | 1 |
| Liberal Party (Venstre) | 3 |
| Local List(s) (Lokale lister) | 7 |
| Total number of members: | 16 |

Tjøtta herredsstyre 1947–1951
| Party name (in Norwegian) | Number of representatives |
|---|---|
| Labour Party (Arbeiderpartiet) | 3 |
| Liberal Party (Venstre) | 3 |
| List of workers, fishermen, and small farmholders (Arbeidere, fiskere, småbrukere liste) | 3 |
| Joint List(s) of Non-Socialist Parties (Borgerlige Felleslister) | 3 |
| Local List(s) (Lokale lister) | 4 |
| Total number of members: | 16 |

Tjøtta herredsstyre 1945–1947
| Party name (in Norwegian) | Number of representatives |
|---|---|
| Labour Party (Arbeiderpartiet) | 4 |
| List of workers, fishermen, and small farmholders (Arbeidere, fiskere, småbrukere liste) | 4 |
| Local List(s) (Lokale lister) | 8 |
| Total number of members: | 16 |

Tjøtta herredsstyre 1937–1941*
| Party name (in Norwegian) | Number of representatives |
|---|---|
| Labour Party (Arbeiderpartiet) | 5 |
| Local List(s) (Lokale lister) | 11 |
| Total number of members: | 16 |
Note: Due to the German occupation of Norway during World War II, no elections were held for new municipal councils until after the war ended in 1945.

=== Mayors ===
The mayor (Norwegian: ordfører) of Tjøtta Municipality was the political leader of the municipality and the chairperson of the municipal council. Here is a list of people who held this position:

- 1862–1869: Unknown
- 1870–1870: J. Smith Offersø
- 1871–1874: Johannes Brodtkorb
- 1875–1876: Ole Amble
- 1877–1878: Rev. Borgen
- 1879–1882: Eilert Nicolaisen Korsvik
- 1883–1894: Andreas F. Nielsen
- 1895–1896: Andreas Moe
- 1897–1902: Johannes M.G. Hansen
- 1902–1920: Ole E. Paasche
- 1920–1922: Johannes M.G. Hansen
- 1923–1926: Ole E. Paasche
- 1926–1940: Johan A. Myklebost
- 1940–1941: J.B. Jakobsen
- 1941–1943: Leiv Eikeland
- 1943–1944: Jørgen Bang
- 1945–1945: Olav Andreassen
- 1945–1947: Petter Olav Johnsen Liland (Ap)
- 1947–1951: Olav Andreassen
- 1951–1955: Petter Olav Johnsen Liland (Ap)
- 1955–1959: Johan Arnt Myklebost
- 1959–1959: Andreas Lisøy
- 1959–1963: Erling Flokkmann
- 1963–1965: Petter Olav Johnsen Liland (Ap)

== Media gallery ==
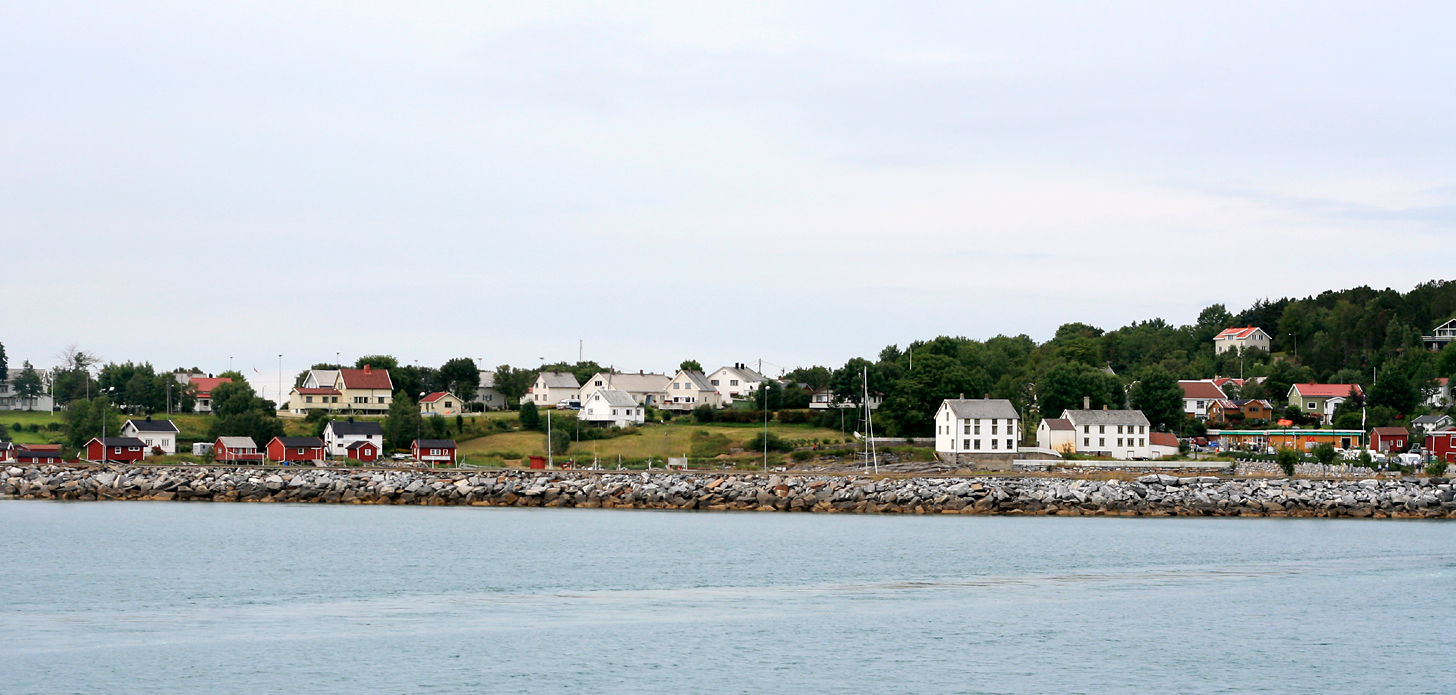
Tjøtta is located on Strandflaten lowland near the sea

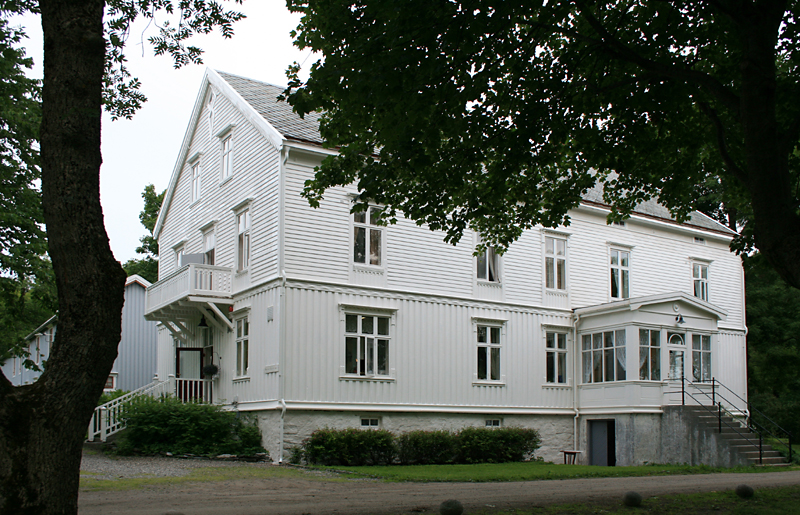
Tjøtta gard, the old Tjøtta farm now the site of a guesthouse

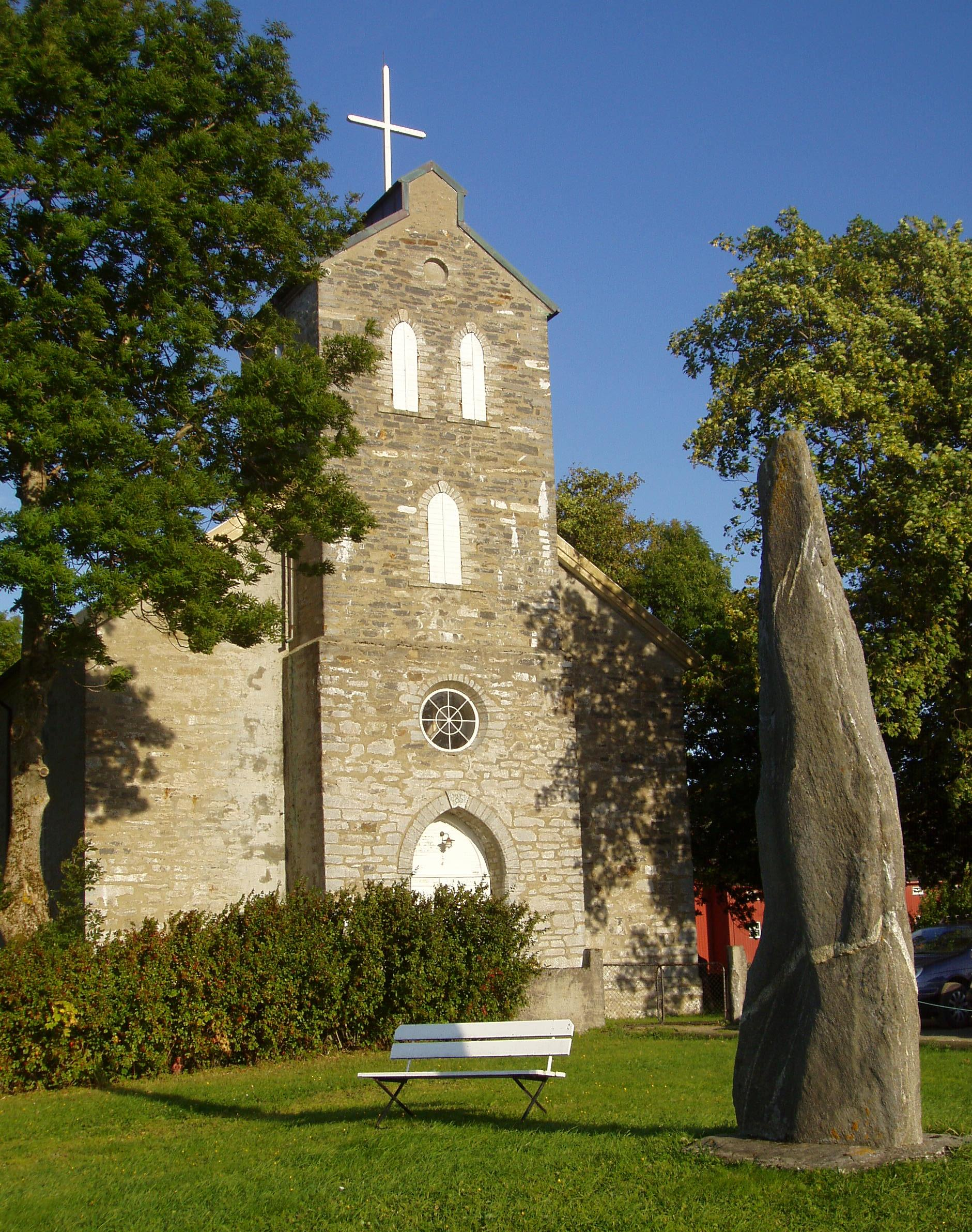
Tjøtta kyrkje, Tjøtta Church

== See also ==
- List of former municipalities of Norway
