= Nøstvik Church =

Church in Nordland, Norway

- Nøstvik kirke / Velfjord kirke
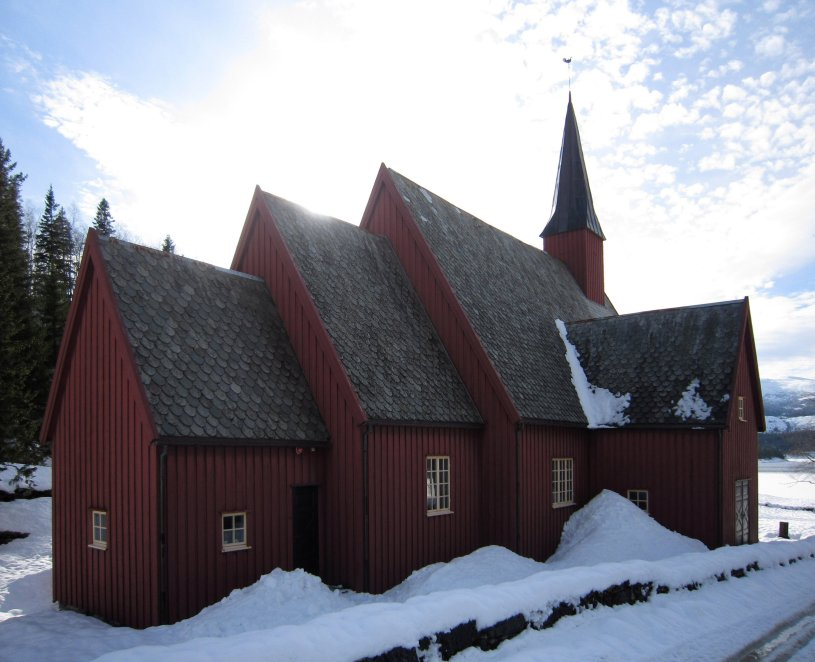
- View of the church
- Nøstvik Church
- 65.4049786°N 12.5219813°E
- Location: Brønnøy Municipality, Nordland
- Country: Norway
- Denomination: Church of Norway
- Churchmanship: Evangelical Lutheran

History
- Status: Parish church
- Founded: 14th century
- Consecrated: 1674

Architecture
- Functional status: Active
- Architectural type: Cruciform
- Completed: 1674 (352 years ago)

Specifications
- Capacity: 270
- Materials: Wood

Administration
- Diocese: Sør-Hålogaland
- Deanery: Sør-Helgeland prosti
- Parish: Velfjord og Tosen
- Norwegian Cultural Heritage Site
- Type: Church
- Status: Automatically protected
- ID: 85800

Nøstvik Church or Velfjord Church (Norwegian: Nøstvik kirke / Velfjord kirke) is a parish church of the Church of Norway in Brønnøy Municipality in Nordland county, Norway. It is located in the village of Hommelstø, on the inner shores of the Sørfjorden branch of the Velfjorden. It is the main church for the Velfjord og Tosen parish which is part of the Sør-Helgeland prosti (deanery) in the Diocese of Sør-Hålogaland. The red, wooden church was built in a cruciform style in 1674. The church seats about 270 people.

== History ==
The earliest existing historical records of the church date back to the year 1589, but the church was not new that year. The first church on this site was a stave church that may have been built in the 14th century. In 1674, the small church was torn down and in its place, a new church was built. The new building was a timber-framed cruciform church with narrow transverse arms on each side of the nave and a narrower choir in the east. At the east end of the chancel there is a sacristy and at the west end of the nave there is a tower on the roof. Historically, this was the main church for the old Velfjord Municipality.

== See also ==
- List of churches in Sør-Hålogaland
