= Odd Grønmo =

Norwegian politician

Odd Henning Grønmo (15 March 1922 – 29 April 2012) was a Norwegian politician for the Christian Democratic Party.

He was born in Brønnøy Municipality, but spent his professional career at Bodø Teacher's College from 1951 to 1989. He was a member of the municipal council of Bodin Municipality from 1956 to 1963, serving as deputy mayor from 1956 to 1959 and mayor from 1960 to 1963. From 1960 to 1983 he was a member of Nordland county council, serving as county mayor from 1976 to 1983.

He was also a supervisory council member of the Bank of Norway for twelve years. He resided in Bodø.

Political offices
Preceded by Ottar Vollan	County mayor of Nordland; 1976–1983	Succeeded by Sigbjørn Eriksen
