= Kari Anne Bøkestad Andreassen =

Norwegian politician

Kari Anne Bøkestad Andreassen (born 16 December 1973) is a Norwegian politician for the Centre Party.

She served as a deputy representative to the Parliament of Norway from Nordland during the term 2017–2021. In total she met during 305 days of parliamentary session. In her native Vevelstad Municipality, she became deputy mayor in 2011 and mayor, the first female of that municipality, in 2015.
