= Tjøtta Soviet War Cemetery =

World War II cemetery in Alstahaug, Northern Norway

Coordinates: 65.8409°N 12.3924°E

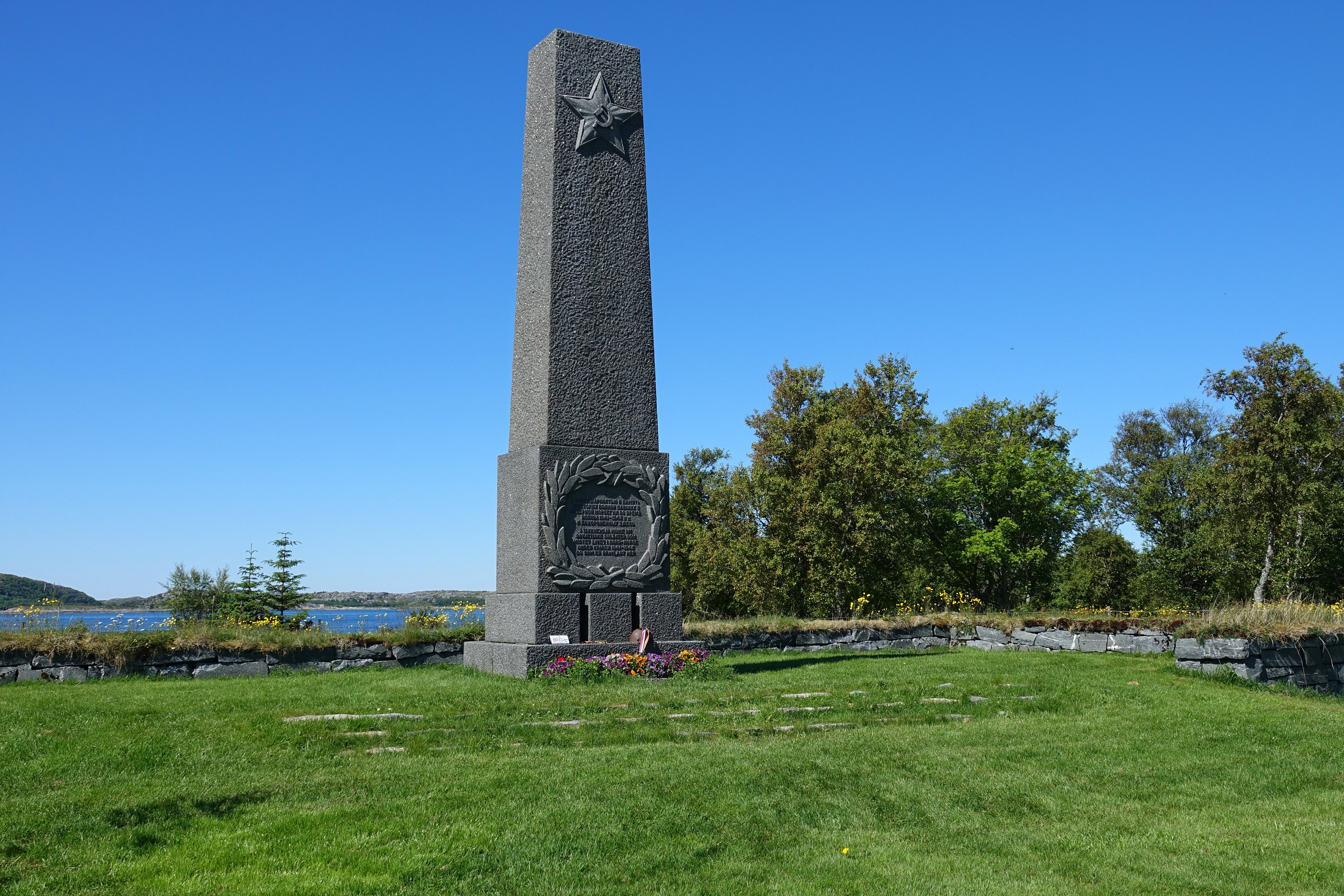
War memorial

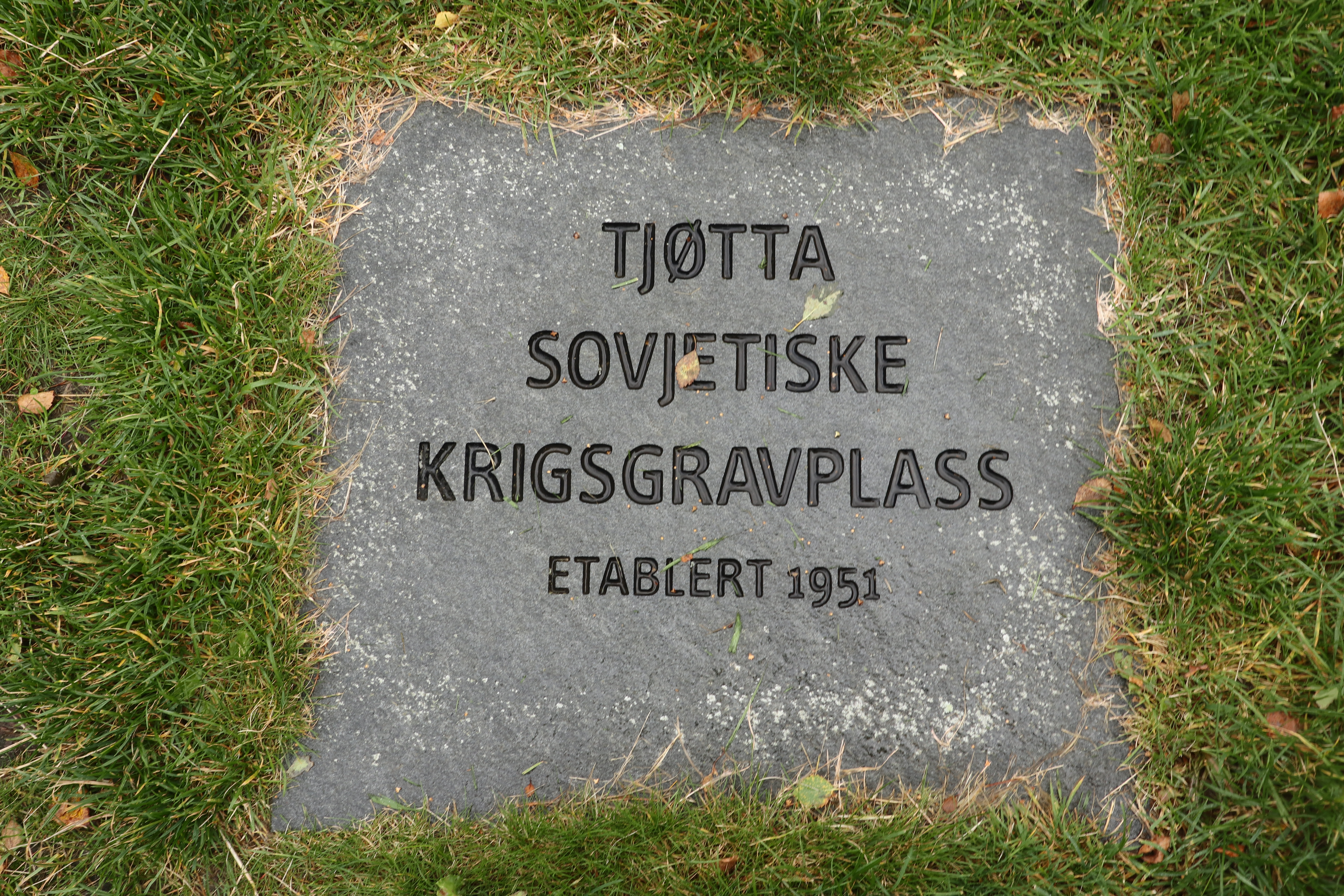
Memorial plaque

Tjøtta Soviet War Cemetery (Tjøtta sovjetiske krigsgravplass) on the island of Tjøtta, Norway, has more than 7,500 war graves, mostly of the Soviet prisoners of war captured by Nazi Germany during World War II and transported to North Norway. The prisoners who died in the prison camps were buried in ordinary church cemeteries or in mass graves near the camps. After the war, the Norwegian authorities decided that they should be moved and brought together in a common cemetery on state ground at Tjøtta. The Soviet Union was now not an ally and there was a wish to keep control of visits from family members. The cemetery was consecrated in 1953 and comprises an enclosed common grave to the north with 6,725 dead, and 826 individual graves to the south.

Further south the Tjøtta International War Cemetery was founded in 1970.
