= Vevelstad Church =

Church in Nordland, Norway

- Vevelstad kirke
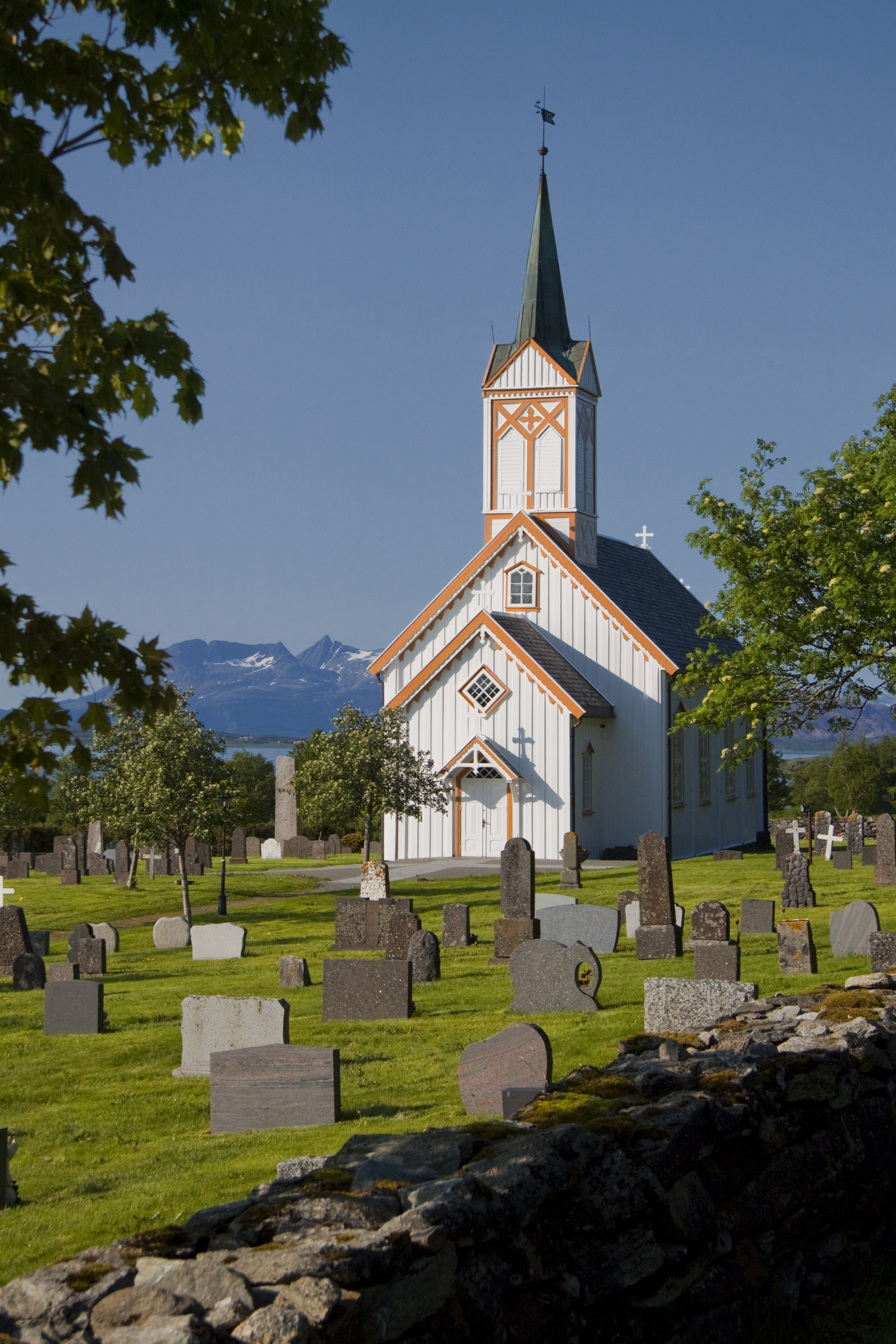
- View of the church
- Vevelstad Church
- 65.7088663°N 12.4551702°E
- Location: Vevelstad Municipality, Nordland
- Country: Norway
- Denomination: Church of Norway
- Churchmanship: Evangelical Lutheran

History
- Status: Parish church
- Founded: 1796
- Consecrated: 1796

Architecture
- Functional status: Active
- Architectural type: Long church
- Completed: 1796 (230 years ago)

Specifications
- Capacity: 250
- Materials: Wood

Administration
- Diocese: Sør-Hålogaland
- Deanery: Sør-Helgeland prosti
- Parish: Vevelstad
- Norwegian Cultural Heritage Site
- Type: Church
- Status: Listed
- ID: 85826

Vevelstad Church (Norwegian: Vevelstad kirke) is a parish church of the Church of Norway in Vevelstad Municipality in Nordland county, Norway. It is located in the village of Forvika. It is the main church for the Vevelstad parish which is part of the Sør-Helgeland prosti (deanery) in the Diocese of Sør-Hålogaland. The white, wooden church was built in a long church style in 1796 using plans drawn up by an unknown architect. The church seats about 250 people. The church was renovated in 1871, expanding the length of the nave and increasing the ceiling height.

== See also ==
- List of churches in Sør-Hålogaland
