= Vevelstad Municipality =

Municipality in Nordland, Norway

Vevelstad Municipality Vevelstad kommune
- Municipality
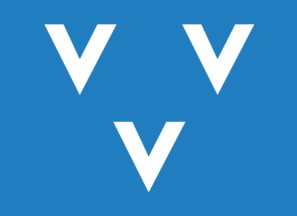
- Flag Coat of arms

- Nordland within Norway

- Vevelstad within Nordland
- Coordinates: 65°40′06″N 12°31′07″E
- Country: Norway
- County: Nordland
- District: Helgeland
- Established: 1 July 1916
  - Preceded by: Tjøtta Municipality
- Administrative centre: Forvik

Government
  - Mayor (2023): Sivert Vevelstad (Ap)

Area
  - Total: 539.04 km^{2} (208.12 sq mi)
  - Land: 516.24 km^{2} (199.32 sq mi)
  - Water: 22.80 km^{2} (8.80 sq mi) 4.2%
  - Rank: #198 in Norway
- Highest elevation: 1,239.2 m (4,066 ft)

Population (2024)
  - Total: 480
  - Rank: #352 in Norway
  - Density: 0.9/km^{2} (2.3/sq mi)
  - Change (10 years): ▼ −3%
- Demonym: Vevelstadværing

Official language
  - Norwegian form: Bokmål
- Time zone: UTC+01:00 (CET)
  - Summer (DST): UTC+02:00 (CEST)
- ISO 3166 code: NO-1816
- Website: Official website

Vevelstad is a municipality in Nordland county, Norway. It is part of the Helgeland traditional region. The administrative centre of the municipality is the village of Forvik. The municipality is relatively small and isolated, with no road connections to the rest of Norway. It is only accessible by ferry, despite much of the municipality being located on the mainland.

The 539-square-kilometre (208 sq mi) municipality is the 198th largest by area out of the 357 municipalities in Norway. Vevelstad Municipality is the 352nd most populous municipality in Norway with a population of 480. The municipality's population density is 0.9 inhabitants per square kilometre (2.3/sq mi) and its population has decreased by 3% over the previous 10-year period.

== General information ==
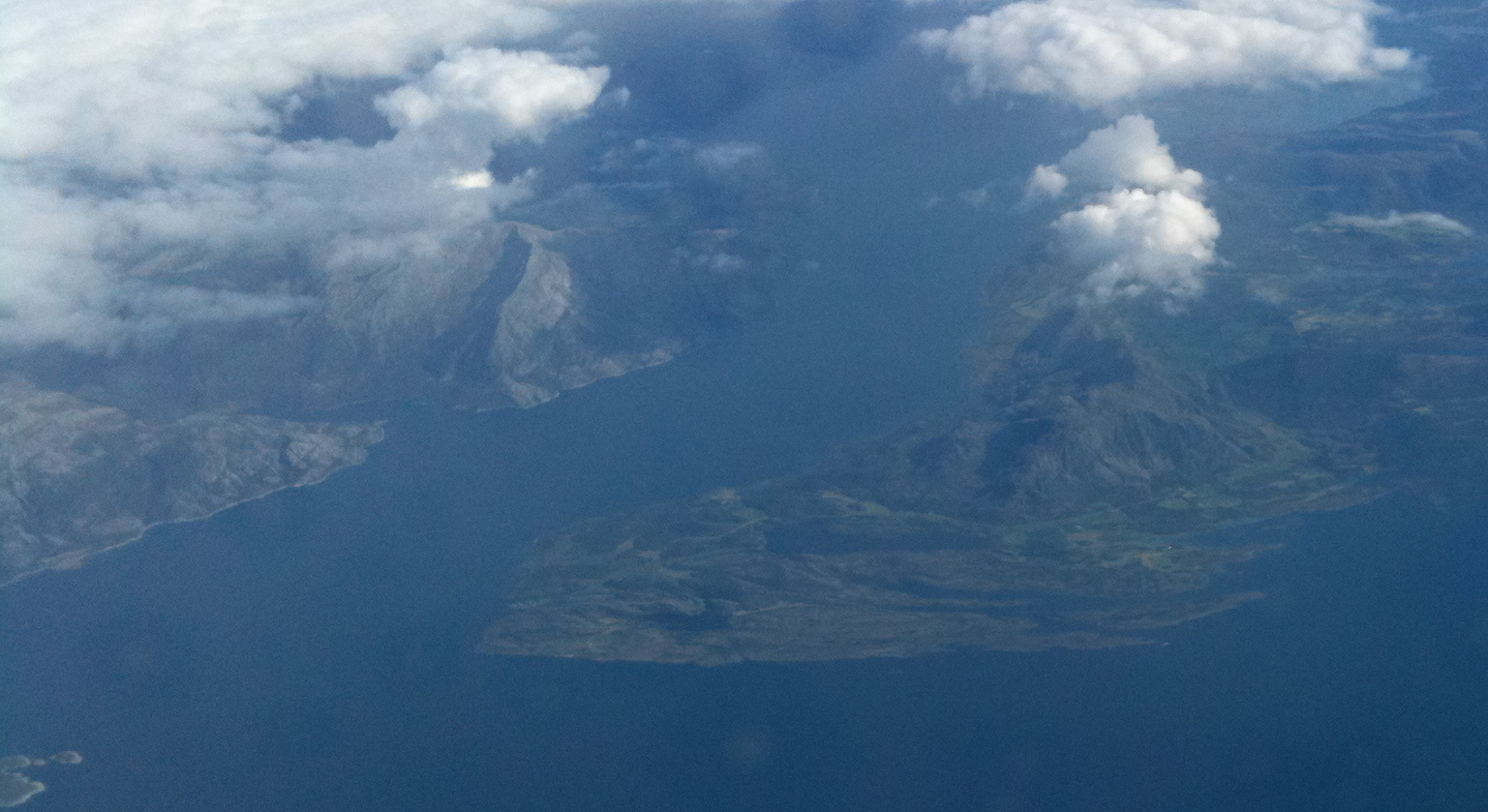
View of the Velfjorden, Vevelstad is on the left side of the fjord.

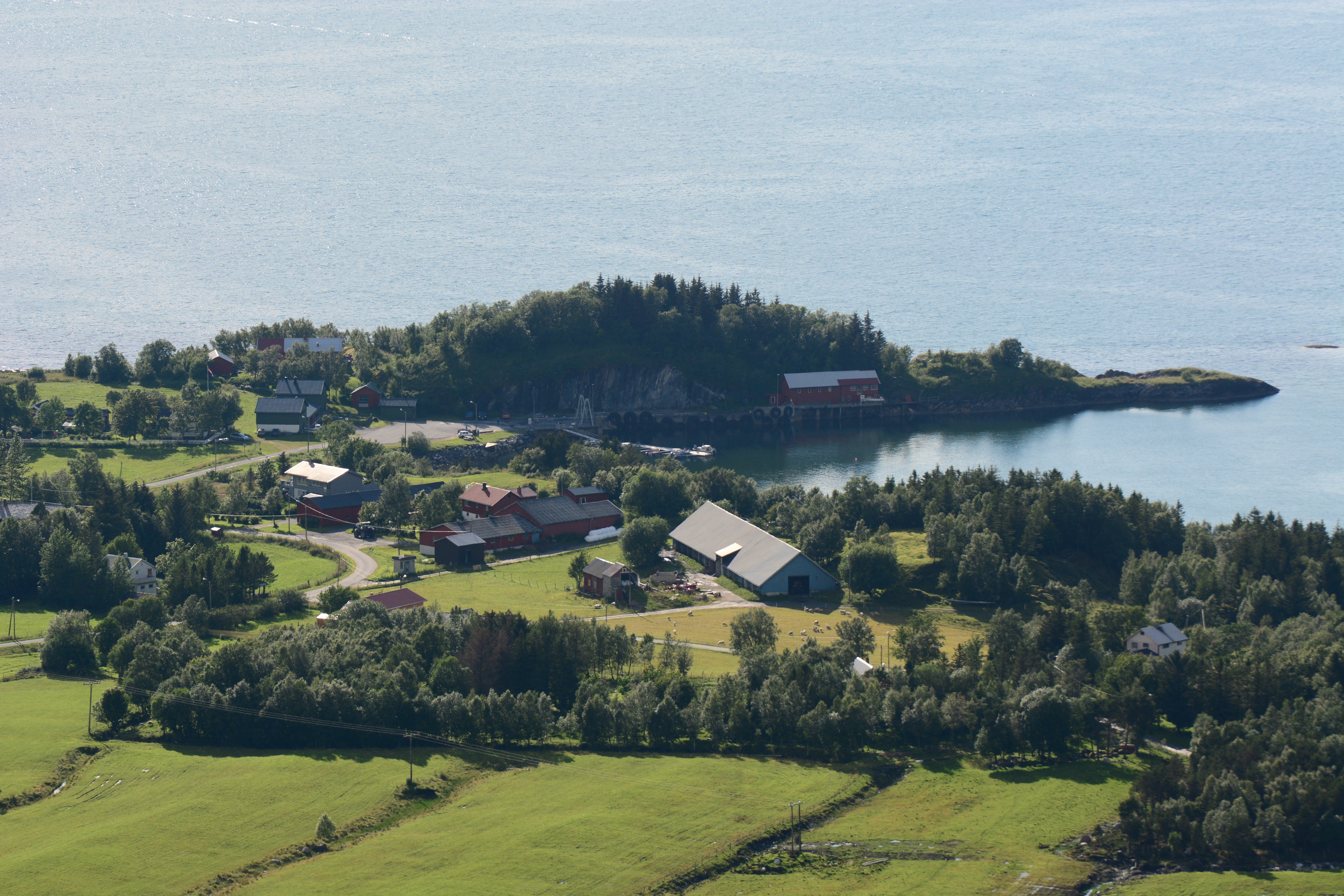
View of the village of Stokka.

The municipality of Vevelstad was established on 1 July 1916 when it was separated from Tjøtta Municipality. Initially, the municipality had 1,097 residents. On 1 July 1920, the Giskå farm area (population: 10) was transferred from Tjøtta Municipality to Vevelstad Municipality. The borders have not changed since that time.

=== Name ===
The municipality (originally the parish) is named after the old Vevelstad farm (Old Norse: Vifilsstaðir), since the first Vevelstad Church was built there. The first element is the genitive case of the Old Norse male name Vifill and the last element is the plural form of staðr which means "homestead" or "farm", therefore it means "Vifill's homestead".

=== Coat of arms ===
The coat of arms was granted on 13 November 1991. The official blazon is "Azure, three inverted couped chevrons argent, two and one" (Norwegian: I blått tre omvendte svevende sølv sparrer, 2-1). This means the arms have a blue field (background) and the charge is three V-shaped figures (two over one). The V-shapes have a tincture of argent which means it is commonly colored white, but if it is made out of metal, then silver is used. The arms are canting, showing the first letter of the name of the municipality, V. The municipality applied for arms in the 1970s, but all the proposals were rejected by either the municipal council or the National Archives. Finally, the present arms were adopted and granted in 1991. The arms were designed by Odd P. Olsen.

=== Churches ===
The Church of Norway has one parish (sokn) within Vevelstad Municipality. It is part of the Sør-Helgeland prosti (deanery) in the Diocese of Sør-Hålogaland.

Churches in Vevelstad Municipality
Parish (sokn)	Church name	Location of the church	Year built
Vevelstad	Vevelstad Church	Forvik	1796

== Geography ==
The municipality lies in the middle of Norway, surrounded by mountains and fjords. A lot of the municipality is a part of Lomsdal–Visten National Park. The lake Søre Vistvatnet lies in the southeastern part of the municipality inside the national park. Most of the residents live along the coastline or on the island Hamnøya. The mouth of the Velfjorden lies in the southern part of the municipality. The highest point in the municipality is the 1,239.2-metre (4,066 ft) tall mountain Vistkjerringa on the border with Vefsn Municipality.

== Government ==
Vevelstad Municipality is responsible for primary education (through 10th grade), outpatient health services, senior citizen services, welfare and other social services, zoning, economic development, and municipal roads and utilities. The municipality is governed by a municipal council of directly elected representatives. The mayor is indirectly elected by a vote of the municipal council. The municipality is under the jurisdiction of the Helgeland District Court and the Hålogaland Court of Appeal.

=== Municipal council ===
The municipal council (Kommunestyre) of Vevelstad Municipality is made up of 13 representatives that are elected to four year terms. The tables below show the current and historical composition of the council by political party.

Vevelstad kommunestyre 2023–2027
Party name (in Norwegian)	Number of representatives
Labour Party (Arbeiderpartiet)	4
Cooperative List (Samarbeidslisten)	5
Municipal List (Kommunelista)	4
Total number of members:	13

Vevelstad kommunestyre 2019–2023
Party name (in Norwegian)	Number of representatives
Cooperative List (Samarbeidslisten)	8
Municipal List (Kommunelista)	5
Total number of members:	13

Vevelstad kommunestyre 2015–2019
Party name (in Norwegian)	Number of representatives
Labour Party (Arbeiderpartiet)	3
Cooperative List (Samarbeidslisten)	6
Municipal List (Kommunelista)	4
Total number of members:	13

Vevelstad kommunestyre 2011–2015
Party name (in Norwegian)	Number of representatives
Labour Party (Arbeiderpartiet)	3
Cooperative List (Samarbeidslisten)	8
Municipal List (Kommunelista)	2
Total number of members:	13

Vevelstad kommunestyre 2007–2011
Party name (in Norwegian)	Number of representatives
Labour Party (Arbeiderpartiet)	4
Municipal list (Kommunelista)	4
Cooperative list (Samarbeidsliste)	5
Total number of members:	13

Vevelstad kommunestyre 2003–2007
Party name (in Norwegian)	Number of representatives
Labour Party (Arbeiderpartiet)	4
Municipal list (Kommunelista)	4
Cooperative list (Samarbeidsliste)	5
Total number of members:	13

Vevelstad kommunestyre 1999–2003
Party name (in Norwegian)	Number of representatives
Coastal Party (Kystpartiet)	2
Centre Party (Senterpartiet)	4
Joint list of the Labour Party (Arbeiderpartiet) and the Socialist Left Party (Sosialistisk Venstreparti)	4
Cooperative list (Samarbeidsliste)	3
Total number of members:	13

Vevelstad kommunestyre 1995–1999
Party name (in Norwegian)	Number of representatives
Conservative Party (Høyre)	2
Centre Party (Senterpartiet)	6
Joint list of the Labour Party (Arbeiderpartiet) and the Socialist Left Party (Sosialistisk Venstreparti)	7
Total number of members:	15

Vevelstad kommunestyre 1991–1995
Party name (in Norwegian)	Number of representatives
Labour Party (Arbeiderpartiet)	6
Conservative Party (Høyre)	1
Socialist Left Party (Sosialistisk Venstreparti)	1
Vevelstad local list (Vevelstad Bygdeliste)	5
Total number of members:	13

Vevelstad kommunestyre 1987–1991
Party name (in Norwegian)	Number of representatives
Labour Party (Arbeiderpartiet)	7
Joint list of the Conservative Party (Høyre), Christian Democratic Party (Kristelig Folkeparti), Centre Party (Senterpartiet), and Liberal Party (Venstre)	6
Total number of members:	13

Vevelstad kommunestyre 1983–1987
Party name (in Norwegian)	Number of representatives
Labour Party (Arbeiderpartiet)	7
Joint list of the Conservative Party (Høyre), Christian Democratic Party (Kristelig Folkeparti), Centre Party (Senterpartiet), and Liberal Party (Venstre)	6
Total number of members:	13

Vevelstad kommunestyre 1979–1983
Party name (in Norwegian)	Number of representatives
Labour Party (Arbeiderpartiet)	7
Joint list of the Conservative Party (Høyre), Christian Democratic Party (Kristelig Folkeparti), Centre Party (Senterpartiet), and Liberal Party (Venstre)	6
Total number of members:	13

Vevelstad kommunestyre 1975–1979
Party name (in Norwegian)	Number of representatives
Labour Party (Arbeiderpartiet)	6
Centre Party (Senterpartiet)	3
Joint list of the Conservative Party (Høyre), Christian Democratic Party (Kristelig Folkeparti), and Liberal Party (Venstre)	4
Total number of members:	13

Vevelstad kommunestyre 1971–1975
Party name (in Norwegian)	Number of representatives
Labour Party (Arbeiderpartiet)	8
Centre Party (Senterpartiet)	3
Joint List(s) of Non-Socialist Parties (Borgerlige Felleslister)	2
Total number of members:	13

Vevelstad kommunestyre 1967–1971
Party name (in Norwegian)	Number of representatives
Labour Party (Arbeiderpartiet)	7
Centre Party (Senterpartiet)	3
Joint List(s) of Non-Socialist Parties (Borgerlige Felleslister)	3
Total number of members:	13

Vevelstad kommunestyre 1963–1967
Party name (in Norwegian)	Number of representatives
Labour Party (Arbeiderpartiet)	7
Socialist People's Party (Sosialistisk Folkeparti)	1
Joint List(s) of Non-Socialist Parties (Borgerlige Felleslister)	5
Total number of members:	13

Vevelstad herredsstyre 1959–1963
Party name (in Norwegian)	Number of representatives
Labour Party (Arbeiderpartiet)	8
Christian Democratic Party (Kristelig Folkeparti)	5
Total number of members:	13

Vevelstad herredsstyre 1955–1959
Party name (in Norwegian)	Number of representatives
Labour Party (Arbeiderpartiet)	9
Joint List(s) of Non-Socialist Parties (Borgerlige Felleslister)	4
Total number of members:	13

Vevelstad herredsstyre 1951–1955
Party name (in Norwegian)	Number of representatives
Local List(s) (Lokale lister)	12
Total number of members:	12

Vevelstad herredsstyre 1947–1951
Party name (in Norwegian)	Number of representatives
Local List(s) (Lokale lister)	12
Total number of members:	12

Vevelstad herredsstyre 1945–1947
Party name (in Norwegian)	Number of representatives
Labour Party (Arbeiderpartiet)	6
Local List(s) (Lokale lister)	6
Total number of members:	12

Vevelstad herredsstyre 1937–1941*
Party name (in Norwegian)	Number of representatives
Local List(s) (Lokale lister)	12
Total number of members:	12
Note: Due to the German occupation of Norway during World War II, no elections were held for new municipal councils until after the war ended in 1945.

=== Mayors ===
The mayor (Norwegian: ordfører) of Vevelstad Municipality is the political leader of the municipality and the chairperson of the municipal council. Here is a list of people who have held this position:

- 1916–1919: Johan Grønbæk
- 1920–1928: Isak Smith-Nilsen
- 1929–1932: Nergaard Vaag (FV)
- 1932–1944: Isak Smith-Nilsen
- 1945–1945: Arne Eliassen
- 1945–1967: Ragnvald Vevelstad (Ap)
- 1967–1970: Eilif Slotvik
- 1970–1975: Ragnvald Vevelstad (Ap)
- 1976–1979: Alf Arnes (V)
- 1980–1987: Per Vevelstad (Ap)
- 1988–1999: Harald Axelsen (Ap)
- 1999–2003: Arnt O. Åsvang (LL)
- 2003–2015: Ken-Richard Hansen (LL)
- 2015–2019: Kari Anne Bøkestad Andreassen (LL)
- 2019–2023: Torhild Haugann (Sp)
- 2023–present: Sivert Vevelstad (Ap)

== Notable people ==
- Kari Anne Bøkestad Andreassen (born 1973 in Vevelstad), a Norwegian politician who was the first female Mayor of the municipality
