= Tjøtta International War Cemetery =

War memorial in Alstahaug, Northern Norway

Coordinates: 65.8458°N 12.3936°E

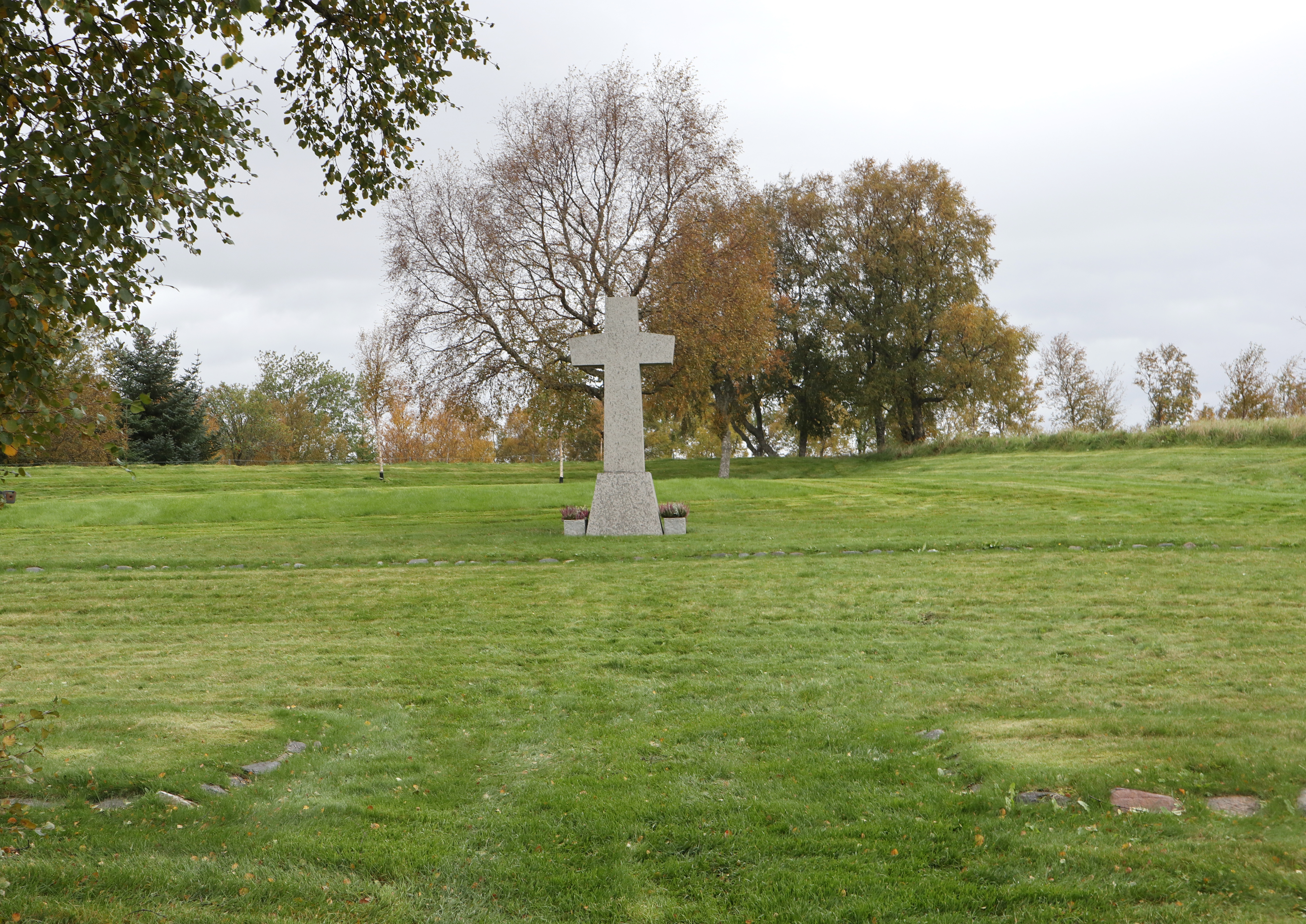
A cross of stone

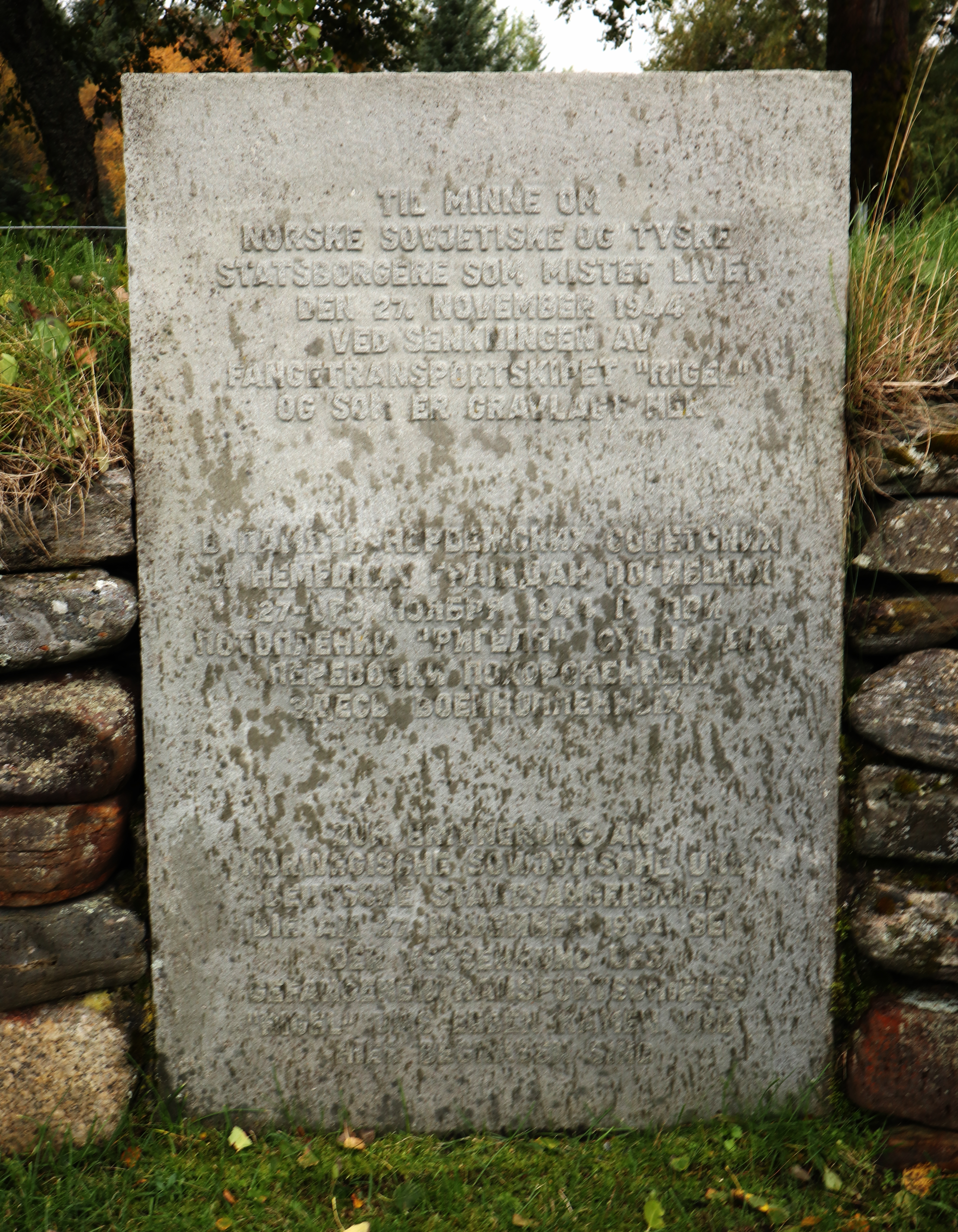

Tjøtta International War Cemetery is a war cemetery on Tjøtta, Northern Norway, founded in 1970. The sinking of the Rigel claimed some 2,500 lives on 27 November 1944. On board were Soviet, Polish and Serbian prisoners of war, Norwegian prisoners and German deserters, German soldiers and Norwegian crew members. The wreck lay partially submerged off the coast of Rosøya island until about 1970, but has now been removed. The dead could not be identified any more. All the graves are anonymous, but a memorial stone in the form of a cross has been erected on the site.

The Tjøtta Soviet War Cemetery further north was founded in 1953.
