= Tjøtta Church =

Church in Nordland, Norway

- Tjøtta kirke
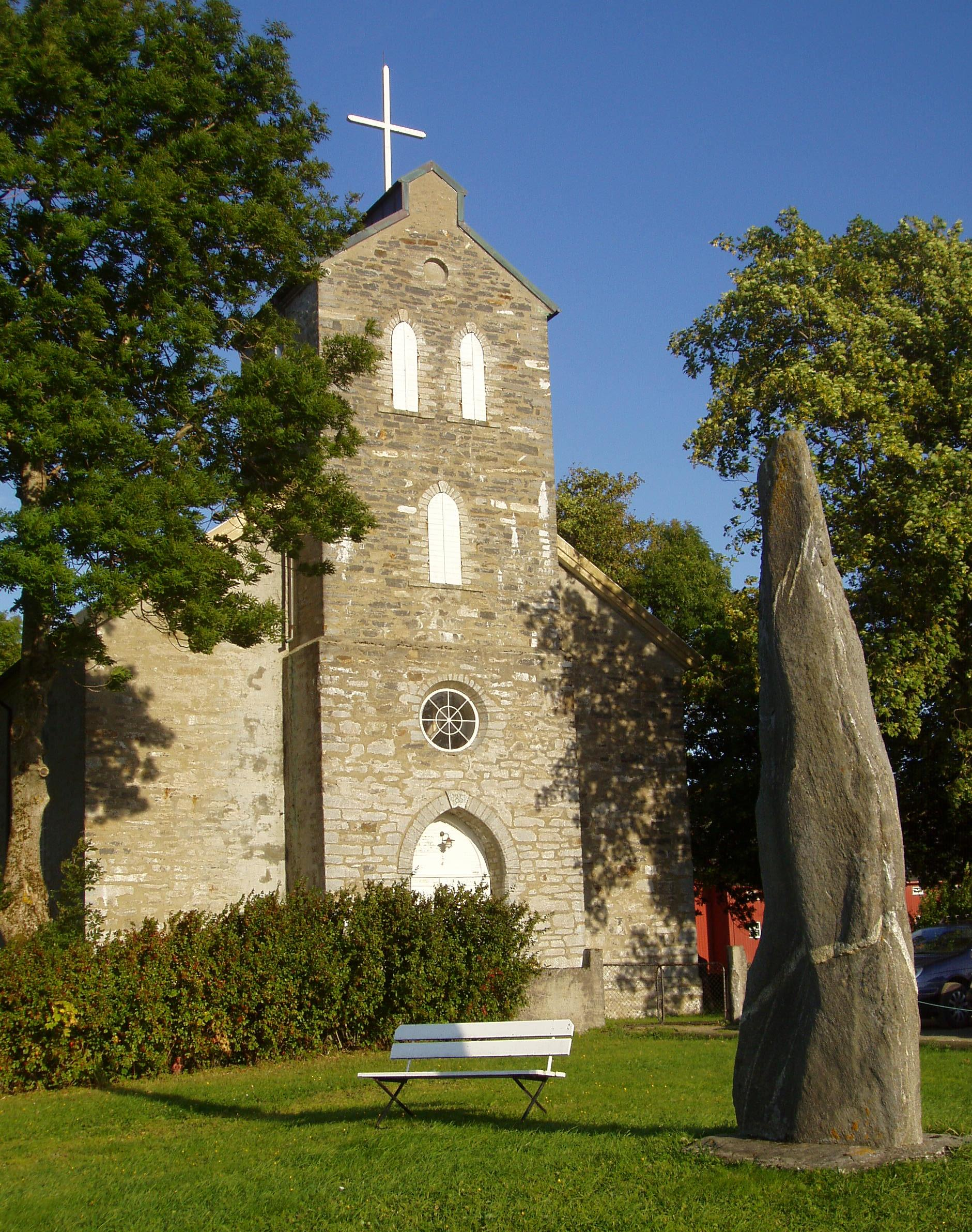
- View of the church
- Tjøtta Church
- 65°49′38″N 12°25′25″E
- Location: Alstahaug Municipality, Nordland
- Country: Norway
- Denomination: Church of Norway
- Churchmanship: Evangelical Lutheran

History
- Status: Parish church
- Founded: 11th century
- Consecrated: 1851

Architecture
- Functional status: Active
- Architect: Christian Heinrich Grosch
- Architectural type: Rectangular
- Completed: 1851 (175 years ago)

Specifications
- Capacity: 310
- Materials: Stone

Administration
- Diocese: Sør-Hålogaland
- Deanery: Nord-Helgeland prosti
- Parish: Tjøtta
- Norwegian Cultural Heritage Site
- Type: Church
- Status: Listed
- ID: 85639

Tjøtta Church (Norwegian: Tjøtta kirke) is a parish church of the Church of Norway in Alstahaug Municipality in Nordland county, Norway. It is located in the village of Tjøtta on the island of Tjøtta. It is the main church for the Tjøtta parish which is part of the Nord-Helgeland prosti (deanery) in the Diocese of Sør-Hålogaland. The stone church was built in a rectangular style in 1851 using plans drawn up by the architect Christian Heinrich Grosch. The church seats about 310 people.

== History ==
The earliest existing historical records of the church date back to the year 1589, but the church was built before that date. It is speculated that the first church here was constructed on the orders of the local Viking chief Hárek of Tjøtta around the year 1000. Hárek converted to Christianity and was baptized in 999, so building a church would have come next. The church originally had a rectangular nave with a narrower rectangular or square chancel. In the 1630s and 1640s, major repair work was carried out on the church, and again also in the 1660s and in 1760. In 1811, lightning struck the church causing a fire and some damage to the building which had to be rebuilt. Then again in 1843 there was a massive fire due to another lightning strike, but this one virtually destroyed the whole building, with only small parts of the original structure remaining. After the fire, the building was torn down and a new church was commissioned to be built on the same site. The new building was significantly larger than the previous church.

== See also ==
- List of churches in Sør-Hålogaland
