= Tjøtta (island) =

Island in Nordland county, Norway

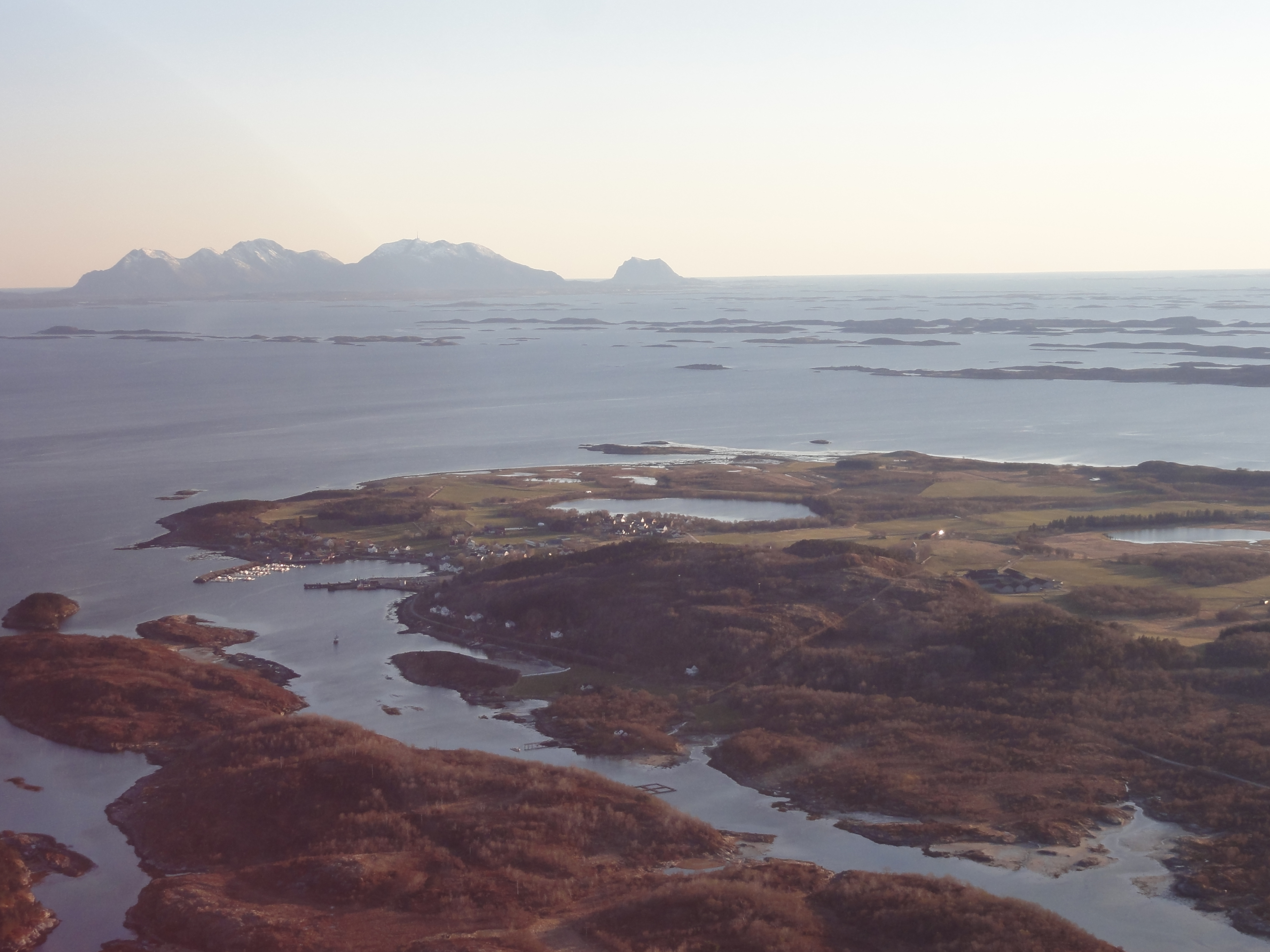
- View of Tjøtta in the foreground (Vega is in the background)
- Interactive map of Tjøtta

Geography
- Location: Nordland, Norway
- Coordinates: 65.8386°N 12.4542°E
- Area: 11.3 km^{2} (4.4 sq mi)
- Length: 7 km (4.3 mi)
- Width: 4 km (2.5 mi)
- Highest elevation: 77 m (253 ft)
- Highest point: Kalvberghaugen

Administration
- Norway
- County: Nordland
- Municipality: Alstahaug Municipality

Tjøtta is an island in Alstahaug Municipality in Nordland county, Norway. The 11.3-square-kilometre (4.4 sq mi) island lies at the entrance to the Vefsnfjorden, just south of the island of Alsta. The U-shaped island is relatively flat, and the highest point is the 77-metre (253 ft) tall Kalvberghaugen, just east of the village of Tjøtta. The island has two main villages on it: Tjøtta and Svinnes. The Norwegian County Road 17 crosses the island and it connects it to the neighboring islands of Offersøya and Alsta by two causeways.

== History ==
Tjøtta has one of the largest and oldest Iron Age farms in Northern Norway, and hardly any places in the region have this many historical relics preserved in one limited area. The chief Hårek of Tjøtta was from here. He was known in the stories of Snorre Sturlason as the governor of Hålogaland. The island was historically the centre of Tjøtta Municipality which existed from 1862 until 1965.

=== Gullhaugen ===
Gullhaugen is located on Tjøtta. The name comes from the Old Norse word haugr meaning hill or mound. Gullhaugen is the site of a large burial mound consisting of over 30 mounds, 5 large round mounds, several elongated mounds, 2 large burial cairns, several stone rings, and a large number of smaller round mounds. The largest mound is about 25 metres (82 ft) across and about 2 to 3 metres (6 ft 7 in to 9 ft 10 in) high. All the mounds in this part of the cemetery has been dated back to the Iron Age.

=== War Cemeteries ===
There are two war cemeteries: Tjøtta Russian War Cemetery from 1953 and Tjøtta International War Cemetery from 1970 with the remains of the victims of Rigel sunk in 1944.

== See also ==
- List of islands of Norway
