= Tjøtta =

- Village
- Interactive map of Tjøtta
- Location within Nordland Location within Norway
- Coordinates: 65.8226°N 12.4284°E
- Country: Norway
- Region: Northern Norway
- County: Nordland
- District: Helgeland
- Municipality: Alstahaug Municipality

Area
  - Total: 0.33 km^{2} (0.13 sq mi)
- Elevation: 4 m (13 ft)

Population (2017)
  - Total: 214
  - Density: 648/km^{2} (1,680/sq mi)
- Time zone: UTC+01:00 (CET)
  - Summer (DST): UTC+02:00 (CEST)
- Post Code: 8860 Tjøtta

Tjøtta is a village in Alstahaug Municipality in Nordland county, Norway. It is located on the southern tip of the island of Tjøtta, which is located south of the large island of Alsta. The village is located on an island, but it does have a mainland road connection via Norwegian County Road 17 and a series of bridges heading north to the town of Sandnessjøen. The historic Tjøtta Church is located in the village.

The 0.33-square-kilometre (82-acre) village had a population (2017) of 214 and a population density of 648 inhabitants per square kilometre (1,680/sq mi). Since 2017, the population and area data for this village area has not been separately tracked by Statistics Norway.

The climate is mild, compared with most of Northern Norway, with a long summer suited for agriculture. The monthly 24-hr averages range from −1.8 °C (28.8 °F) in the coldest month to 13 °C (55 °F) in both July and August. The average yearly rainfall is 1,020 millimetres (40 in).

== History ==
Tjøtta is mentioned in the Heimskringla many times; this was the home of Hárek of Tjøtta, one of the leaders of the peasant army which killed Olav Haraldsson at the Battle of Stiklestad. There is archeological evidence of Iron Age agriculture in the area- Tjøtta gard, the largest medieval farm in North Norway was located at the present-day village of Tjøtta.

From 1862 until 1965, the village of Tjøtta was the administrative centre of the old Tjøtta Municipality.

== Media gallery ==
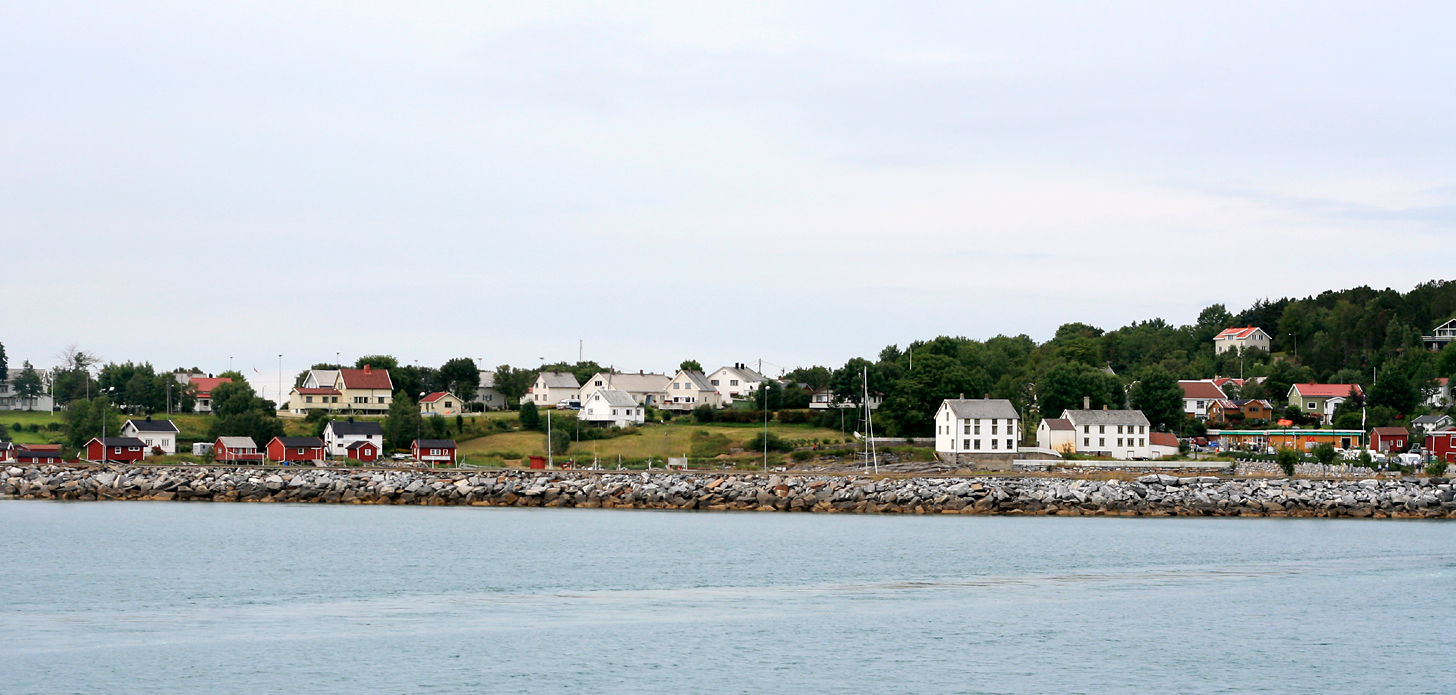
Tjøtta is located on Strandflaten lowland near the sea

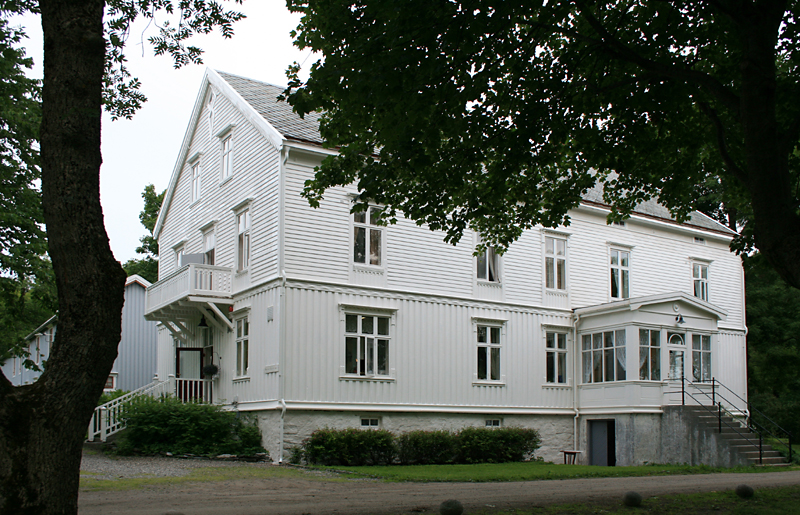
Tjøtta gard, the old Tjøtta farm now the site of a guesthouse

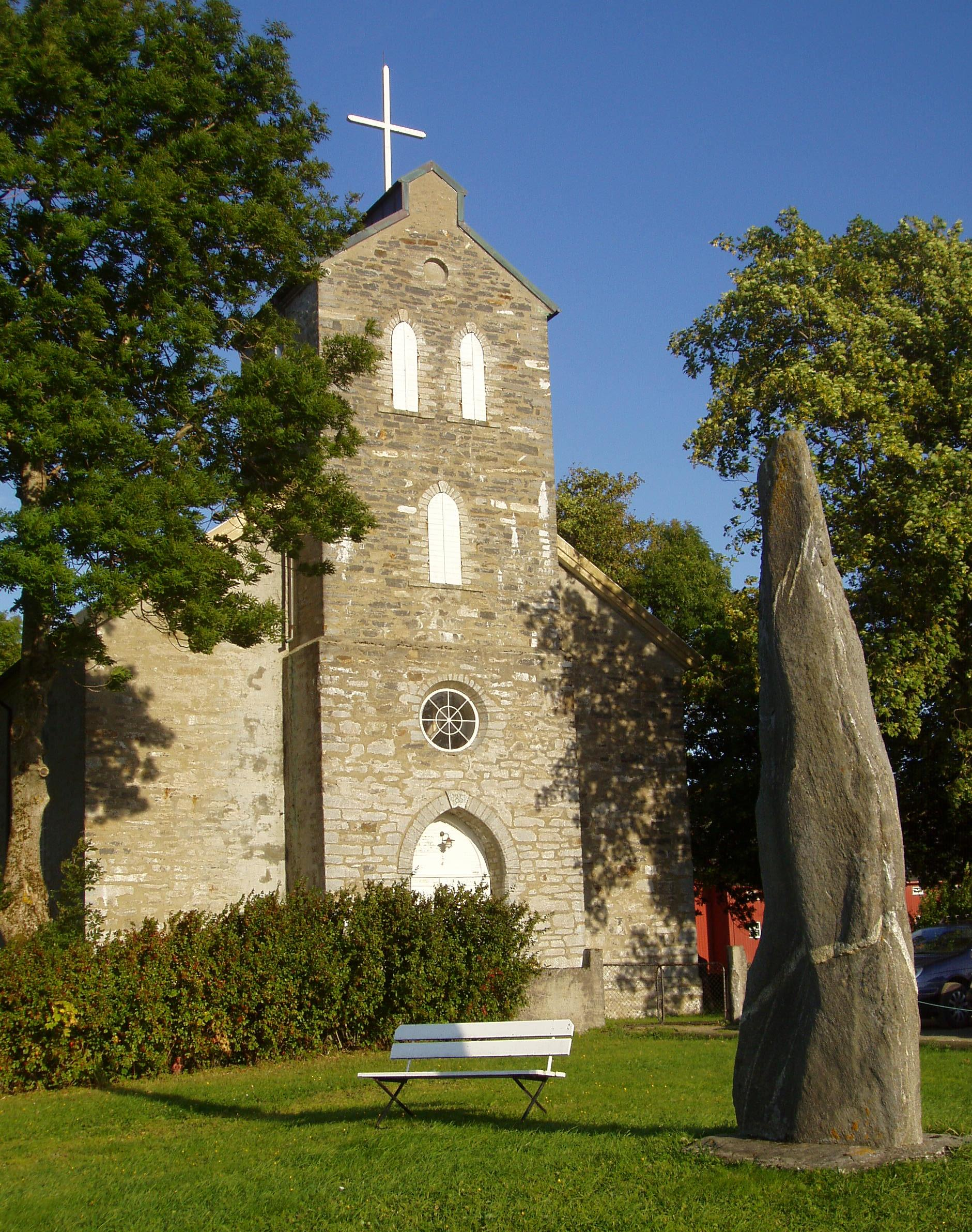
Tjøtta kyrkje, Tjøtta Church
