= Velfjorden =

Fjord in Nordland, Norway

- Interactive map of the fjord
- Location: Nordland county, Norway
- Coordinates: 65.5442°N 12.3389°E
- Type: Fjord
- Basin countries: Norway
- Max. length: 31 kilometres (19 mi)

Velfjorden is a fjord in Nordland county, Norway. The fjord is located mostly in Brønnøy Municipality, but part of the northern portion of the fjord lies in Vevelstad Municipality. The 31-kilometre (19 mi) fjord stretches from northwest to southeast with many side-arms branching off the main fjord. Two of the main side branches are the Sørfjorden and Langfjorden. Most of the settlements are on the southwestern shore of the fjord and the Lomsdal-Visten National Park lies on the northeastern shore of the fjord.

== Media gallery ==
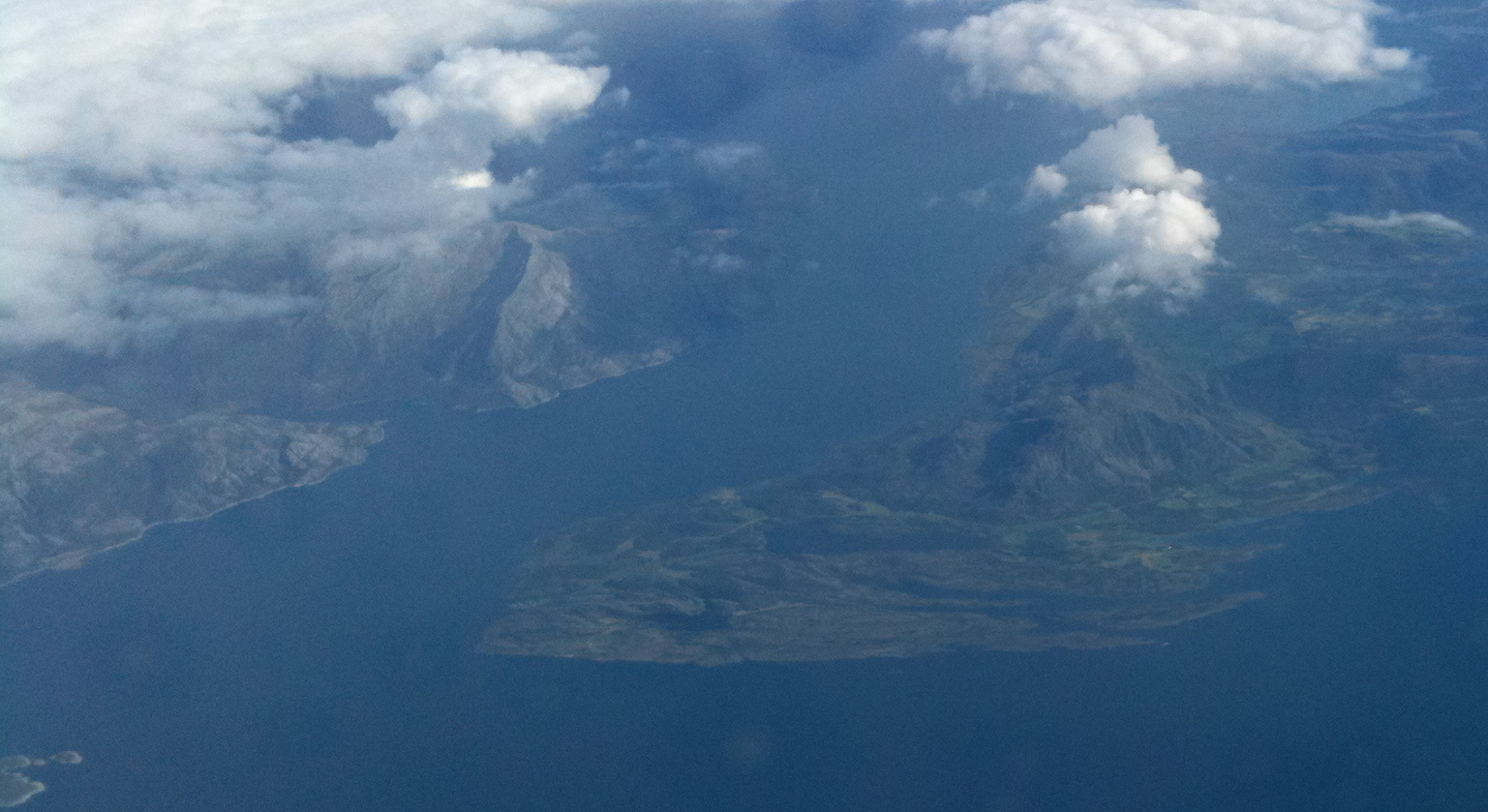
View of the fjord looking southeast

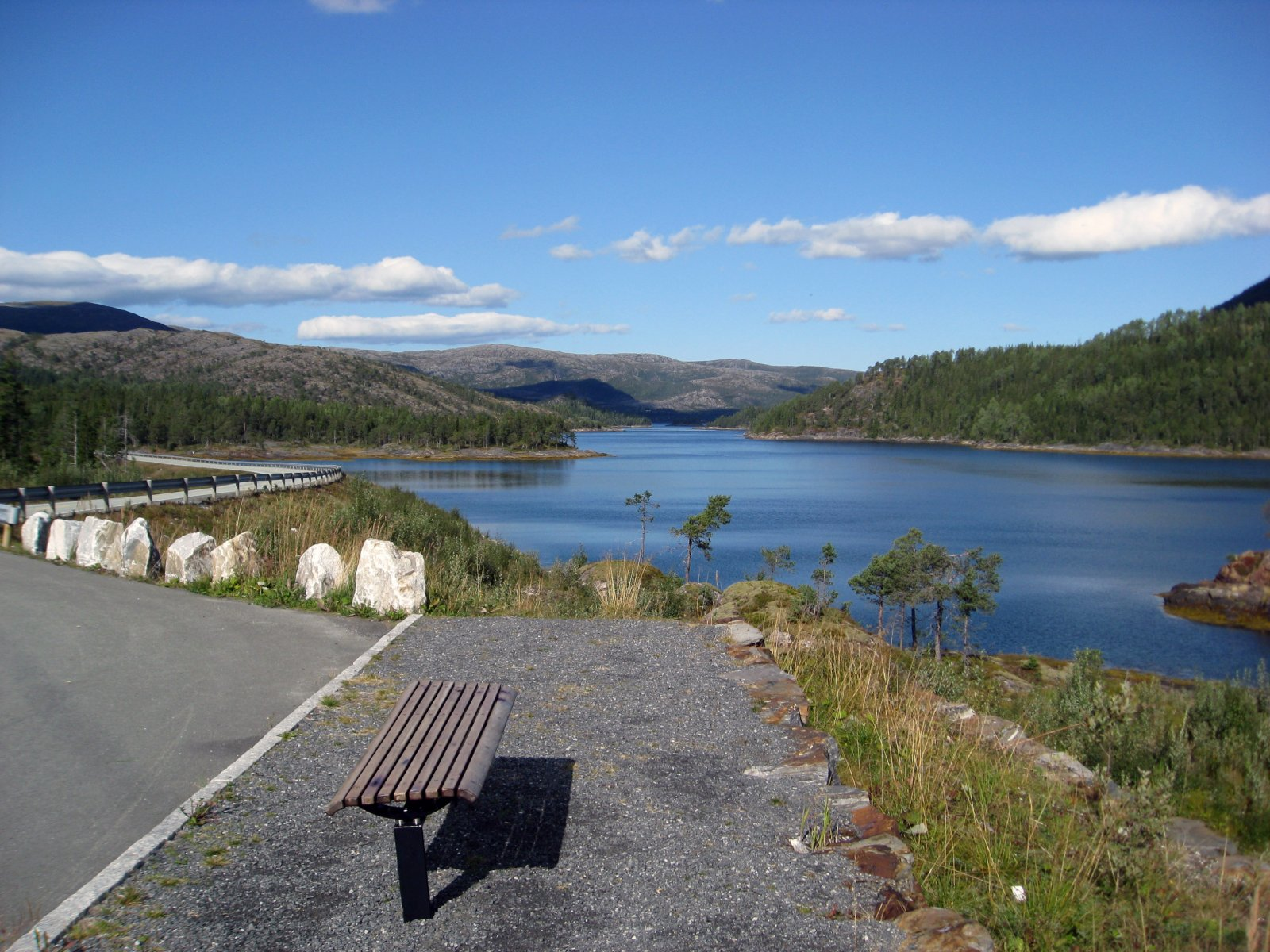
View of the Sørfjorden arm of the Velfjorden

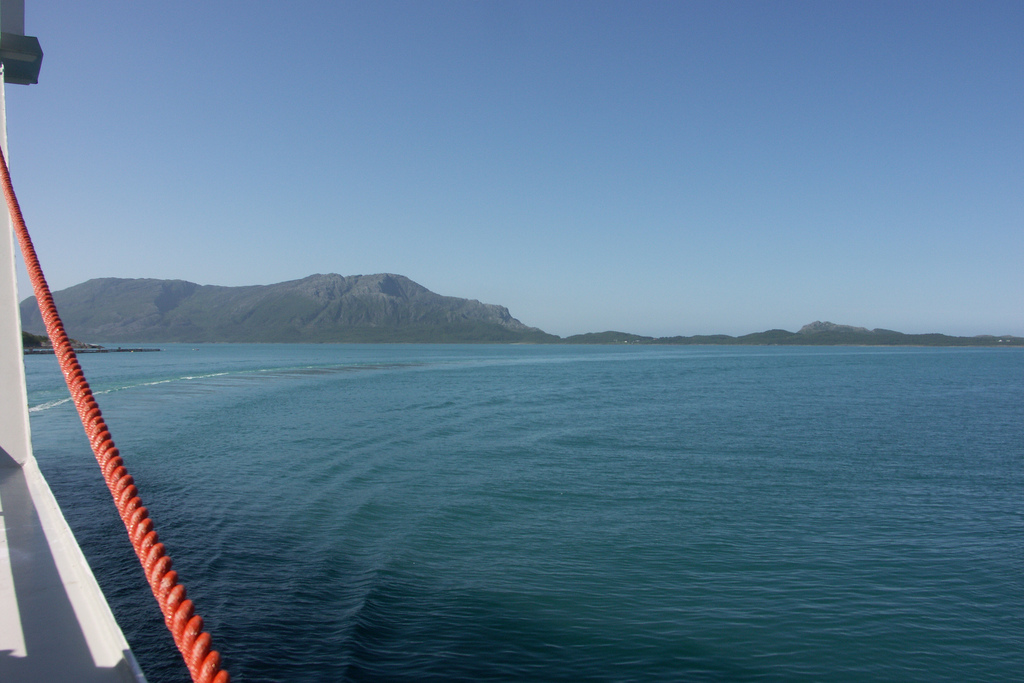
View on the ferry that crosses the Velfjorden

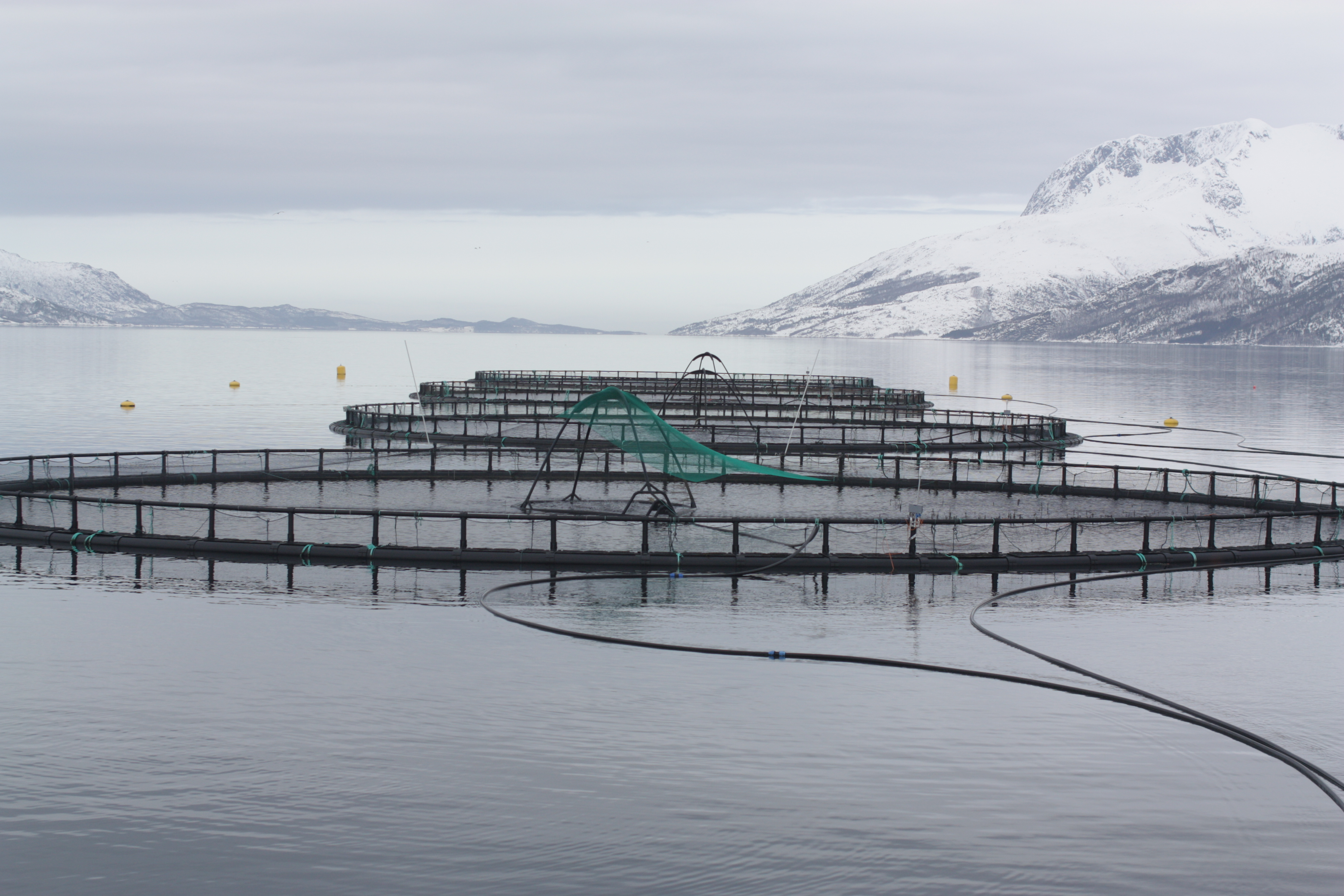
Fish cages in the Velfjorden
