= Arstaddalsdammen =

Lake in Beiarn, Norway

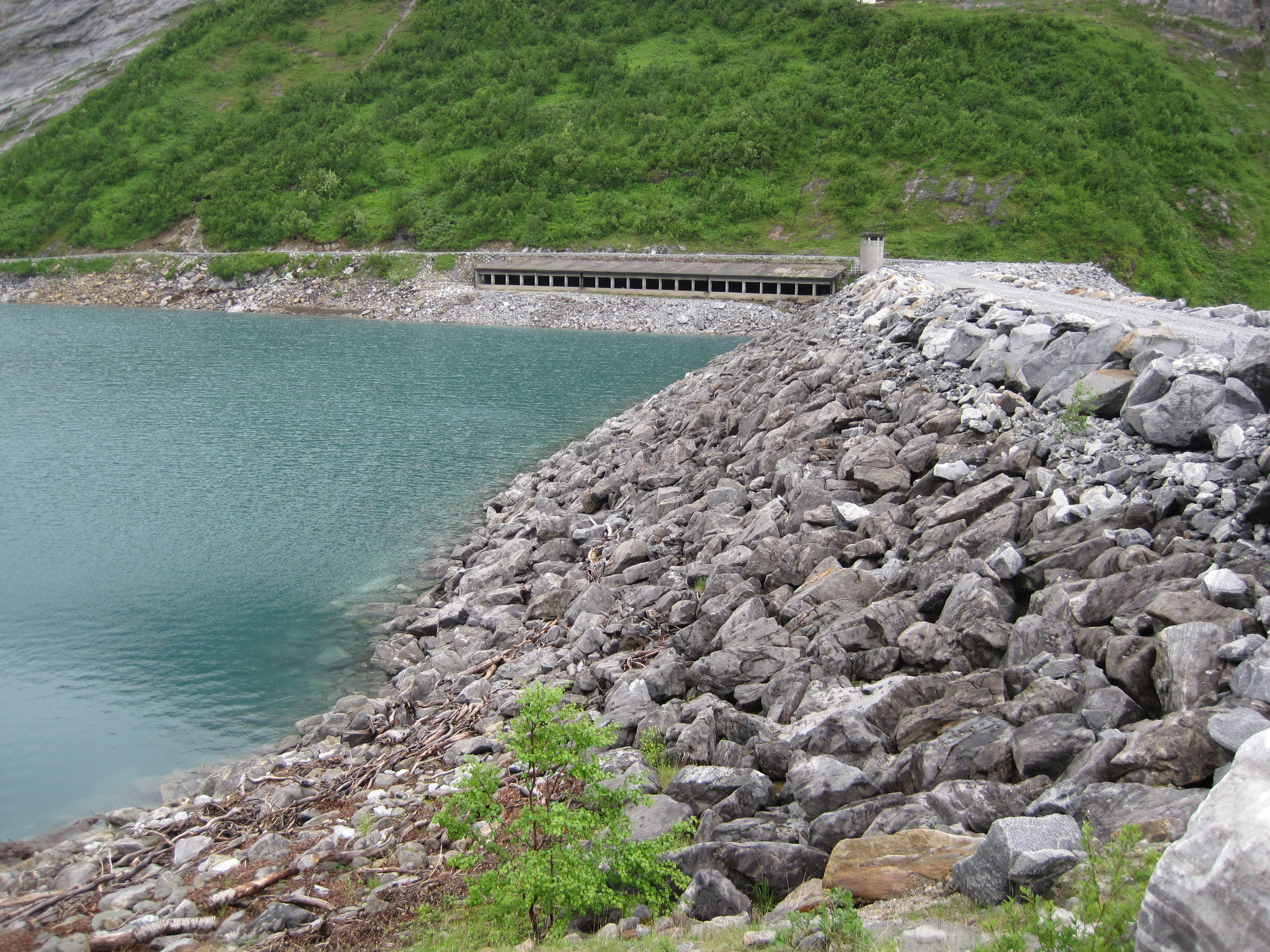
- Interactive map of the lake
- Location: Beiarn Municipality, Nordland
- Coordinates: 66.9003°N 14.3775°E
- Basin countries: Norway
- Built: 1960s
- Max. length: 4.5 kilometres (2.8 mi)
- Max. width: 1 kilometre (0.62 mi)
- Surface area: 2.54 km^{2} (0.98 sq mi)
- Shore length^{1}: 9.66 kilometres (6.00 mi)
- Surface elevation: 340 metres (1,120 ft)
- References: NVE
- ^{1} Shore length is not a well-defined measure.

Arstaddalsdammen is a lake that lies in Beiarn Municipality in Nordland county, Norway. It is located about 15 kilometres (9.3 mi) southwest of the village of Moldjord. The 2.54-square-kilometre (0.98 sq mi) lake lies in the southern end of the Arstaddal valley, and it has a dam on the northern end. The dam was built in the 1960s. The water from the lake is piped to the nearby lake Sokumvatnet in Gildeskål Municipality. The lake serves as a reservoir for the Sundsfjord Hydroelectric Power Station.

== See also ==
- List of lakes in Norway
- Geography of Norway
