= Skoddebergvatnet =

Lake in Troms, Norway

Skoddebergvatnet (Norwegian); Skoaberjávri (Northern Sami)
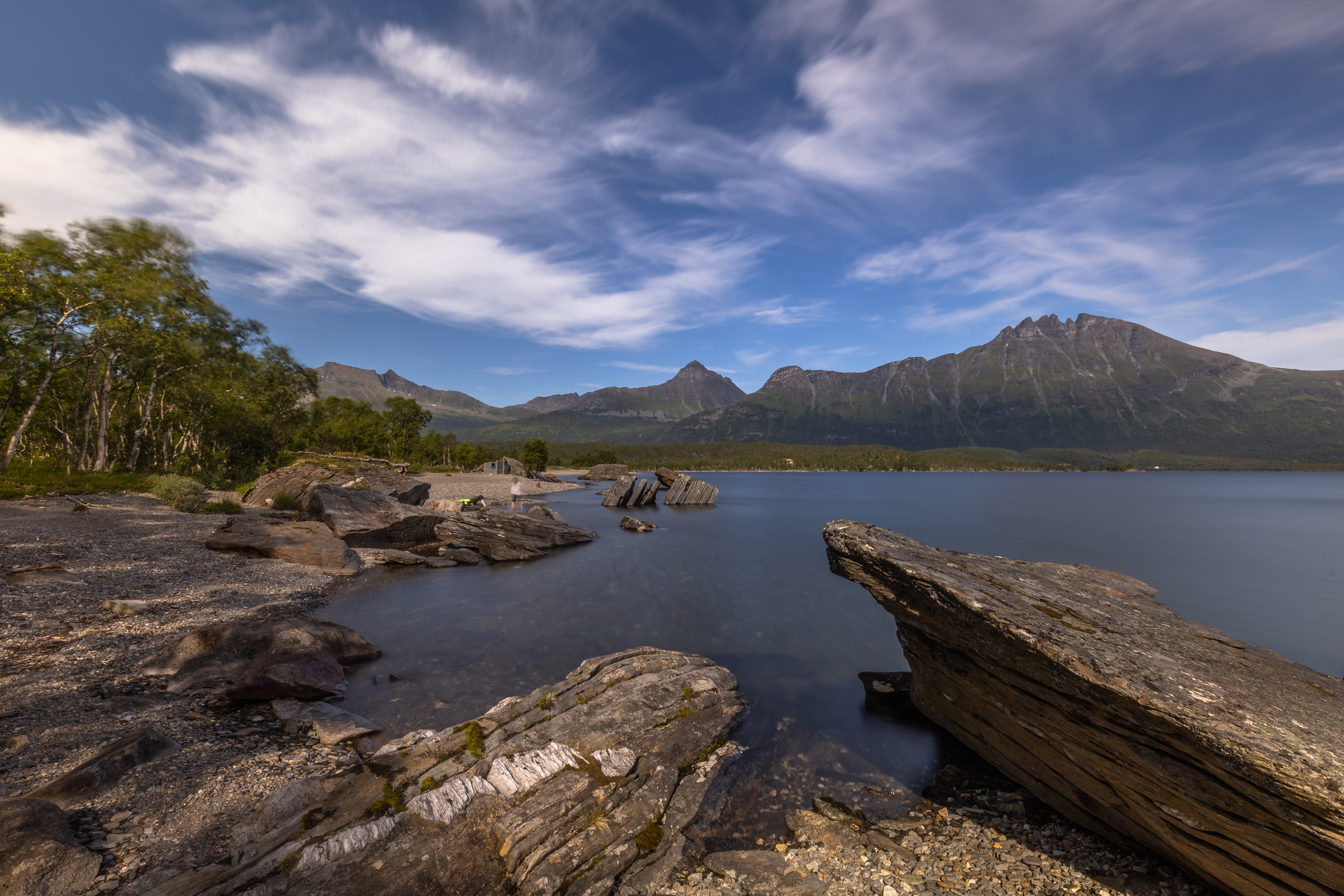
- Interactive map of the lake
- Location: Tjeldsund Municipality, Troms
- Coordinates: 68.3551°N 17.1429°E
- Type: Reservoir
- Basin countries: Norway
- Max. length: 6 kilometres (3.7 mi)
- Max. width: 2 kilometres (1.2 mi)
- Surface area: 8.56 km^{2} (3.31 sq mi)
- Surface elevation: 101 metres (331 ft)
- References: NVE

Skoddebergvatnet (Norwegian) or Skoaberjávri (Northern Sami) is a lake that lies in Tjeldsund Municipality in Troms county, Norway. The 8.56-square-kilometre (3.31 sq mi) lake lies just north of the border with Nordland county, about 8 kilometres (5.0 mi) south of the village of Grov.

== See also ==
- List of lakes in Norway
- Geography of Norway
