= Fellvatnet =

Lake in Gildeskål, Norway

Fellvatnet (Norwegian); Roavggojávrre (Lule Sami)
- Interactive map of the lake
- Location: Gildeskål Municipality, Nordland
- Coordinates: 66.8508°N 14.1591°E
- Basin countries: Norway
- Max. length: 3 kilometres (1.9 mi)
- Max. width: 1 kilometre (0.62 mi)
- Surface area: 2.72 km^{2} (1.05 sq mi)
- Shore length^{1}: 7.91 kilometres (4.92 mi)
- Surface elevation: 396 metres (1,299 ft)
- References: NVE
- ^{1} Shore length is not a well-defined measure.

Fellvatnet (Norwegian) or Roavggojávrre (Lule Sami) is a lake that lies in Gildeskål Municipality in Nordland county, Norway. The lake is located on the mainland of Norway, north of the large lake Storglomvatnet and the Svartisen glacier. It is located in an isolated, uninhabited part of Gildeskål, south of the lake Langvatnet. It serves as a reservoir for the Langvann Hydroelectric Power Station.

== See also ==
- List of lakes in Norway
