= Langvann Hydroelectric Power Station =

Langvann Power Station
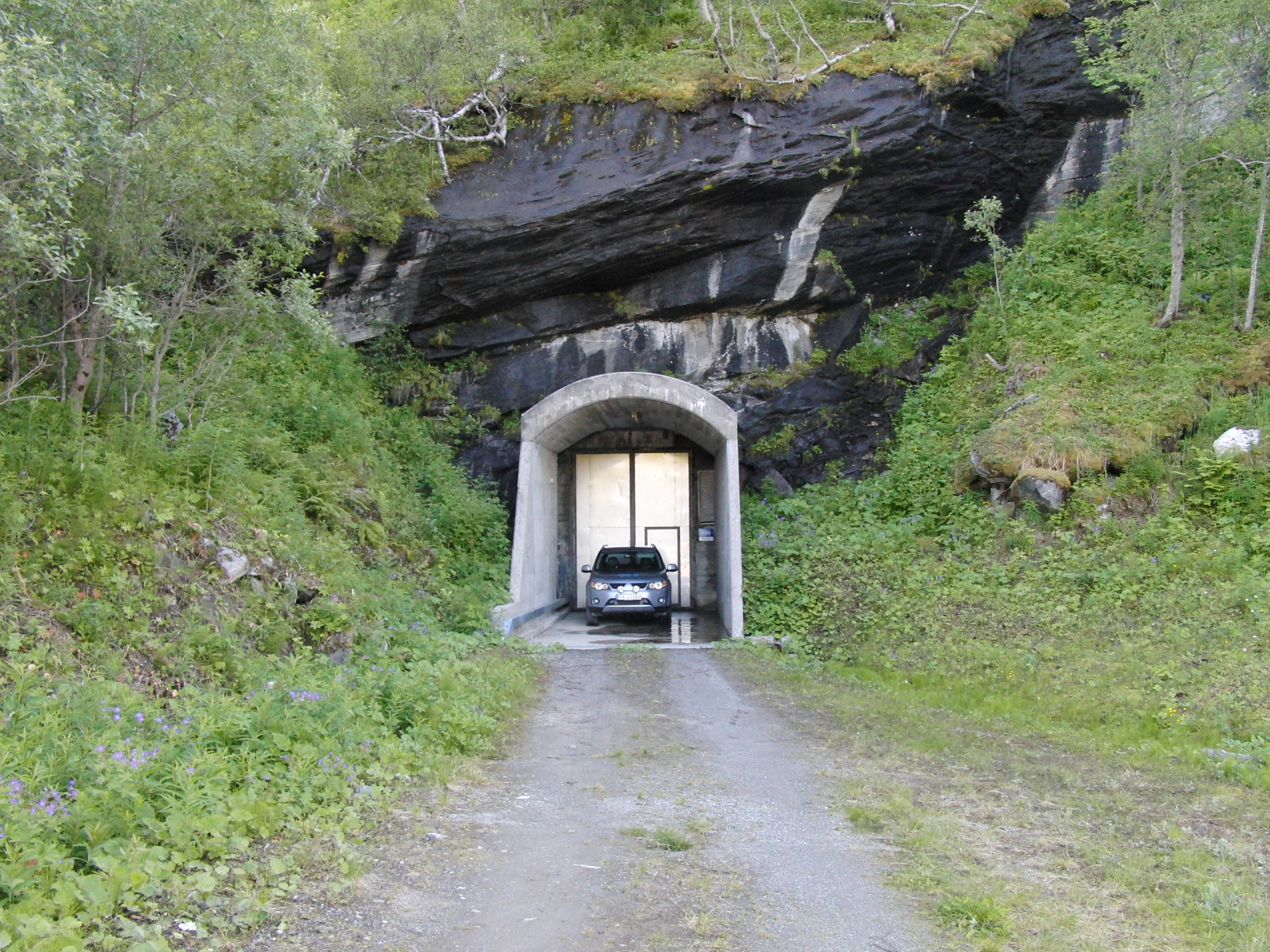
- Official name: Langvann kraftverk
- Country: Norway
- Location: Gildeskål Municipality, Nordland
- Coordinates: 66°53′16″N 14°08′55″E
- Status: Operational
- Opening date: 1979; 46 years ago
- Owner(s): Salten Kraftsamband

Upper reservoir
- Creates: Fellvatnet

Lower reservoir
- Creates: Langvatnet (Gildeskål)

Power Station
- Hydraulic head: 64 metres (210 ft)
- Turbines: 1 × 5 megawatts (6,700 hp)
- Installed capacity: 5 MW
- Capacity factor: 11.5%
- Annual generation: 21 GW·h

The Langvann Hydroelectric Power Station (Norwegian: Langvann kraftverk or Langvann kraftstasjon) is a hydroelectric power station in Gildeskål Municipality in Nordland county, Norway. It is sometimes referred to as the Langvatn kraftverk, which should not be confused with the Langvatn Hydroelectric Power Station in Rana Municipality.

The plant utilizes a drop of 64 meters (210 ft) between two lakes: Fellvatnet (Lule Sami: Roavggojávrre), regulated between an elevation of 393 m (1,289 ft) and 333 m (1,093 ft), and Langvatnet (Lule Sami: Gåddumjávrre), regulated between an elevation of 331 m (1,086 ft) and 299 m (981 ft).

The plant has a 5 megawatts (6,700 hp) turbine and an average annual production of about 21 gigawatt-hours (76 TJ). Its catchment area is 93 square kilometers (36 sq mi). The plant is owned by Salten Kraftsamband and it came into operation in 1979. The plant is built into the mountainside at the end of a drain tunnel and the water it discharges is later used by the Sundsfjord Hydroelectric Power Station.
