= Langvatnet (Gildeskål) =

Lake in Gildeskål, Norway

Langvatnet (Norwegian); Gåddumjávrre (Lule Sami)
- Interactive map of the lake
- Location: Gildeskål Municipality, Nordland
- Coordinates: 66.9051°N 14.1607°E
- Basin countries: Norway
- Max. length: 3.5 kilometres (2.2 mi)
- Max. width: 2 kilometres (1.2 mi)
- Surface area: 3.81 km^{2} (1.47 sq mi)
- Shore length^{1}: 11.51 kilometres (7.15 mi)
- Surface elevation: 334 metres (1,096 ft)
- References: NVE
- ^{1} Shore length is not a well-defined measure.

Langvatnet (Norwegian) or Gåddumjávrre (Lule Sami) is a lake that lies in Gildeskål Municipality in Nordland county, Norway. The lake is located about 15 kilometres (9.3 mi) southeast of the municipal centre of Inndyr. It sits directly southwest of the large lake Sokumvatnet. The lake is partially supplied by discharge from the Langvann Hydroelectric Power Station and serves as a reservoir for the Sundsfjord Hydroelectric Power Station.

== See also ==
- List of lakes in Norway
- Geography of Norway
