= Sundsfjord Hydroelectric Power Station =

Sundsfjord Power Station
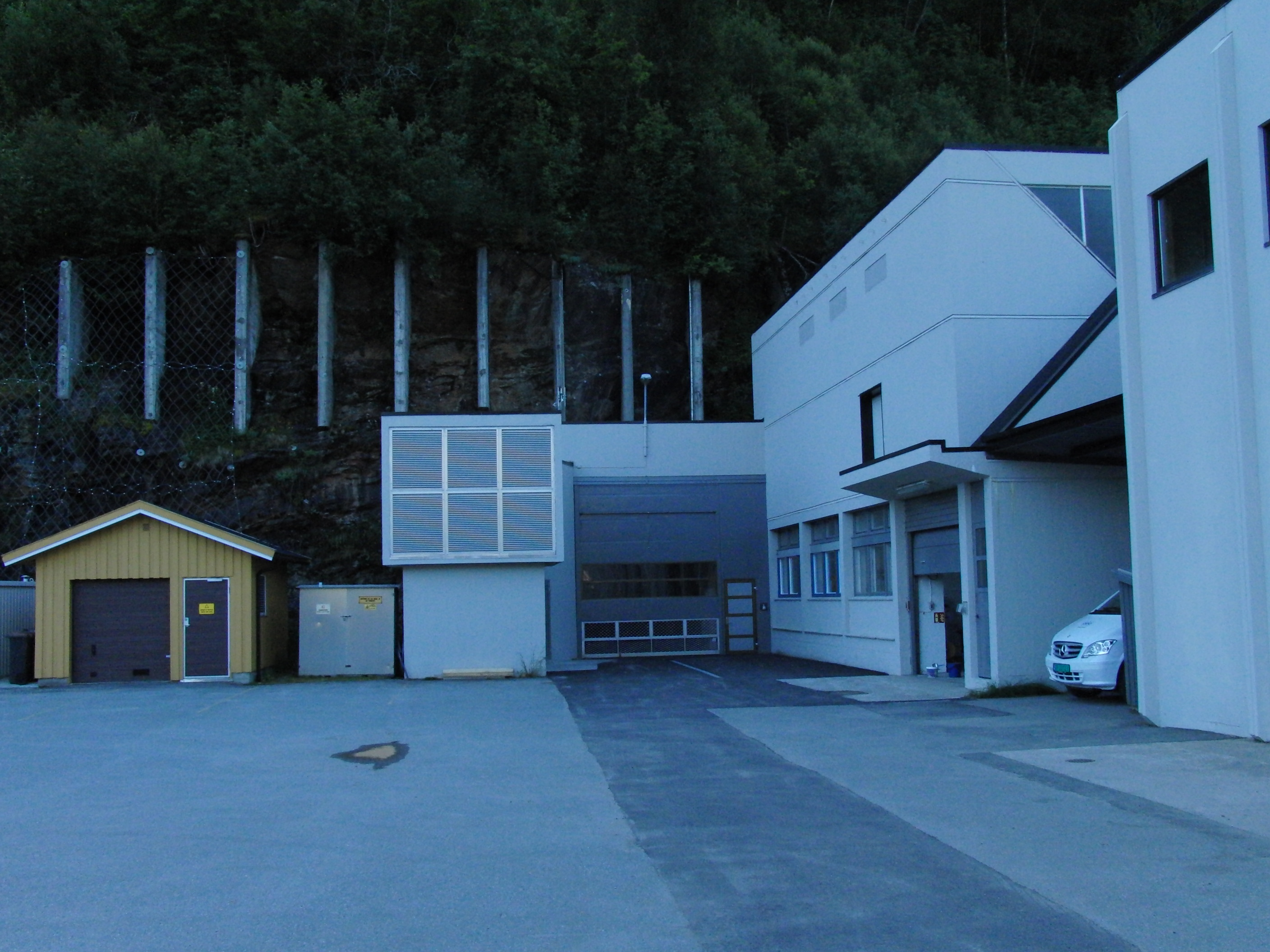
- Official name: Sundsfjord kraftverk
- Country: Norway
- Location: Gildeskål Municipality, Nordland
- Coordinates: 66°58′15″N 14°09′06″E
- Status: Operational
- Opening date: 1963; 62 years ago
- Owner(s): Salten Kraftsamband

Power Station
- Hydraulic head: 317 metres (1,040 ft)
- Turbines: 3 × 34 megawatts (46,000 hp)
- Installed capacity: 102 MW
- Capacity factor: 59.9%
- Annual generation: 535 GW·h

The Sundsfjord Hydroelectric Power Station (Norwegian: Sundsfjord kraftverk or Sundsfjord kraftstasjon) is a hydroelectric power station in Gildeskål Municipality in Nordland county, Norway. Part of the plant's catchment area also lies in Beiarn Municipality.

The plant utilizes a drop of 317 meters (1,040 ft), using three lakes as reservoirs: Sokumvatnet (Lule Sami: Såhkamjávrre) and Langvatnet (Lule Sami: Gåddumjávrre), both regulated between an elevation of 331 m (1,086 ft) and 299 m (981 ft), and Arstaddalsdammen, which is regulated between an elevation of 333 m (1,093 ft) and 299 m (981 ft). The Forså Hydroelectric Power Station supplies water to Sokumvatnet and the Langvann Hydroelectric Power Station supplies water to Langvatnet.

The plant has three 34-megawatt (46,000 hp) Francis turbines with an installed capacity of 102 megawatts (137,000 hp) and an average annual production of about 535 gigawatt-hours (1,930 TJ). Its catchment area is 168 square kilometers (65 sq mi). The plant was originally built by Norsk Hydro and Gildeskål Kraftlag to supply industry at Glomfjord and is now owned by Salten Kraftsamband. It came into operation in 1963.
