= Sokumvatnet =

Lake in Gildeskål, Norway

Sokumvatnet (Norwegian); Såhkamjávrre (Lule Sami)
- Interactive map of the lake
- Location: Gildeskål Municipality, Nordland
- Coordinates: 66.9192°N 14.2126°E
- Basin countries: Norway
- Max. length: 5 kilometres (3.1 mi)
- Max. width: 1.3 kilometres (0.81 mi)
- Surface area: 6.54 km^{2} (2.53 sq mi)
- Shore length^{1}: 26.36 kilometres (16.38 mi)
- Surface elevation: 322 metres (1,056 ft)
- References: NVE
- ^{1} Shore length is not a well-defined measure.

Sokumvatnet (Norwegian) or Såhkamjávrre (Lule Sami) is a lake that lies in Gildeskål Municipality in Nordland county, Norway. Sokumvatnet is located about 15 kilometres (9.3 mi) southeast of the village of Inndyr. It lies just south of the lake Litle Sokumvatnet and northeast of the lake Langvatnet. The lake serves as a reservoir for the Sundsfjord Hydroelectric Power Station.

== See also ==
- List of lakes in Norway
- Geography of Norway
