= Geography of Norway =

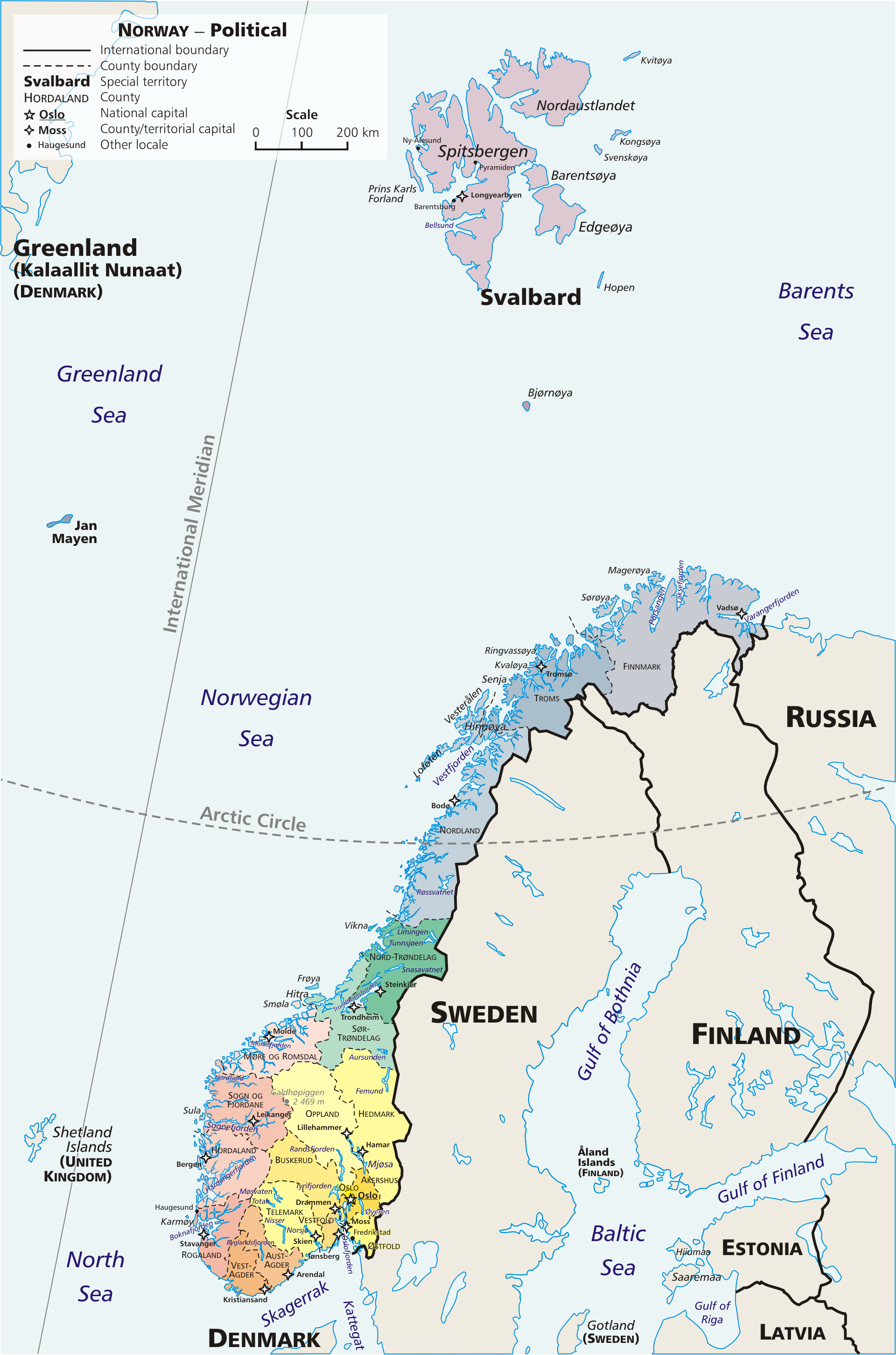
- Continent: Europe
- Region: Northern Europe
- Coordinates: 50 degrees north and 8 degrees east
- Area: Ranked 67th
  - Total: 323,802 km^{2} (125,021 sq mi)
  - Land: 94.95%
  - Water: 5.05%
- Coastline: 25,148 km (15,626 mi)
- Borders: Total land borders: 2515 km
- Highest point: Galdhøpiggen; 2,469 m
- Lowest point: Norwegian Sea -0 meters
- Longest river: Glomma; 604 km
- Largest lake: Mjøsa; 362 km^{2}
- Exclusive economic zone: Norway with Svalbard, Jan Mayen and Bouvet Island: 385,199 km^{2} (148,726 mi^{2})

Norway is a country located in Northern Europe in the northern and western parts of the Scandinavian Peninsula. The majority of the country borders water, including the Skagerrak inlet to the south, the North Sea to the southwest, the North Atlantic Ocean (Norwegian Sea) to the west, and the Barents Sea to the north. It borders Sweden to the east, and in the northeast it has land borders with Finland and with Russia.

Norway has an elongated shape, one of the longest and most rugged coastlines in the world, and there are a total of 320,249 islands and islets (239,057 islands and 81,192 islets) along its much-indented coastline, according to Kartverket (the official Norwegian mapping agency). It is one of the world's northernmost countries, and it is one of Europe's most mountainous countries, with large areas dominated by the Scandinavian Mountains. The country's average elevation is 460 metres (1,510 ft), and 32 percent of the mainland is located above the tree line. Its country-length chain of peaks is geologically continuous with the mountains of Scotland, Ireland, and, after crossing under the Atlantic Ocean, the Appalachian Mountains of North America. Geologists hold that all these formed a single range before the breakup of the ancient supercontinent Pangaea.

During the Last Glacial Period, as well as in many earlier ice ages, virtually the entire country was covered with a thick ice sheet. The movement of the ice carved out deep valleys. As a result of the ice carving, Sognefjorden is the world's second deepest fjord and Hornindalsvatnet is the deepest lake in Europe. When the ice melted, the sea filled many of these valleys, creating Norway's famous fjords. The glaciers in the higher mountain areas today are not remnants of the large ice sheet of the ice age—their origins are more recent. The regional climate was up to 1–3 °C (1.8–5.4 °F) warmer in 7000 BC to 3000 BC in the Holocene climatic optimum, (relative to the 1961-90 period), melting the remaining glaciers in the mountains almost completely during that period.

Even though it has long since been released from the enormous weight of the ice, the land is still rebounding several millimetres a year. This rebound is greatest in the eastern part of the country and in the inner parts of the long fjords, where the ice cover was thickest. This is a slow process, and for thousands of years following the end of the ice age, the sea covered substantial areas of what is today dry land. This old seabed is now among the most productive agricultural lands in the country.

== Area and borders ==
The total area of Norway is 324,220 km^{2} (125,180 sq mi), with 16,360 km^{2} (6,320 sq mi) being water. With Svalbard and Jan Mayen included, the total area is 385,199 km^{2} (148,726 sq mi).

Of its 2,515 km (1,563 mi) land boundary, it shares 1,619 km (1,006 mi) with Sweden, 729 km (453 mi) with Finland, and 196 km (122 mi) with Russia.

The continental coastline of Norway is 25,148 km (15,626 mi); with islands included, it is 83,281 km (51,748 mi)

Norway and its territorial waters

Norway's exclusive economic zone (EEZ) totals 2,385,178 km^{2} (920,922 sq mi). It is one of the largest in Europe and the 17th-largest in the world. The EEZ along the mainland makes up 878,575 km^{2} (339,220 sq mi), the Jan Mayen EEZ makes up 29,349 km^{2} (11,332 sq mi), and since 1977 Norway has claimed an economic zone around Svalbard of 803,993 km^{2} (310,423 sq mi). Norway also has maritime claims of 10 nmi (18.5 km; 11.5 mi) for the contiguous zone, 200 nmi (370.4 km; 230.2 mi) for the continental shelf, and 12 nmi (22.2 km; 13.8 mi) for the territorial sea.

== Physical geography ==
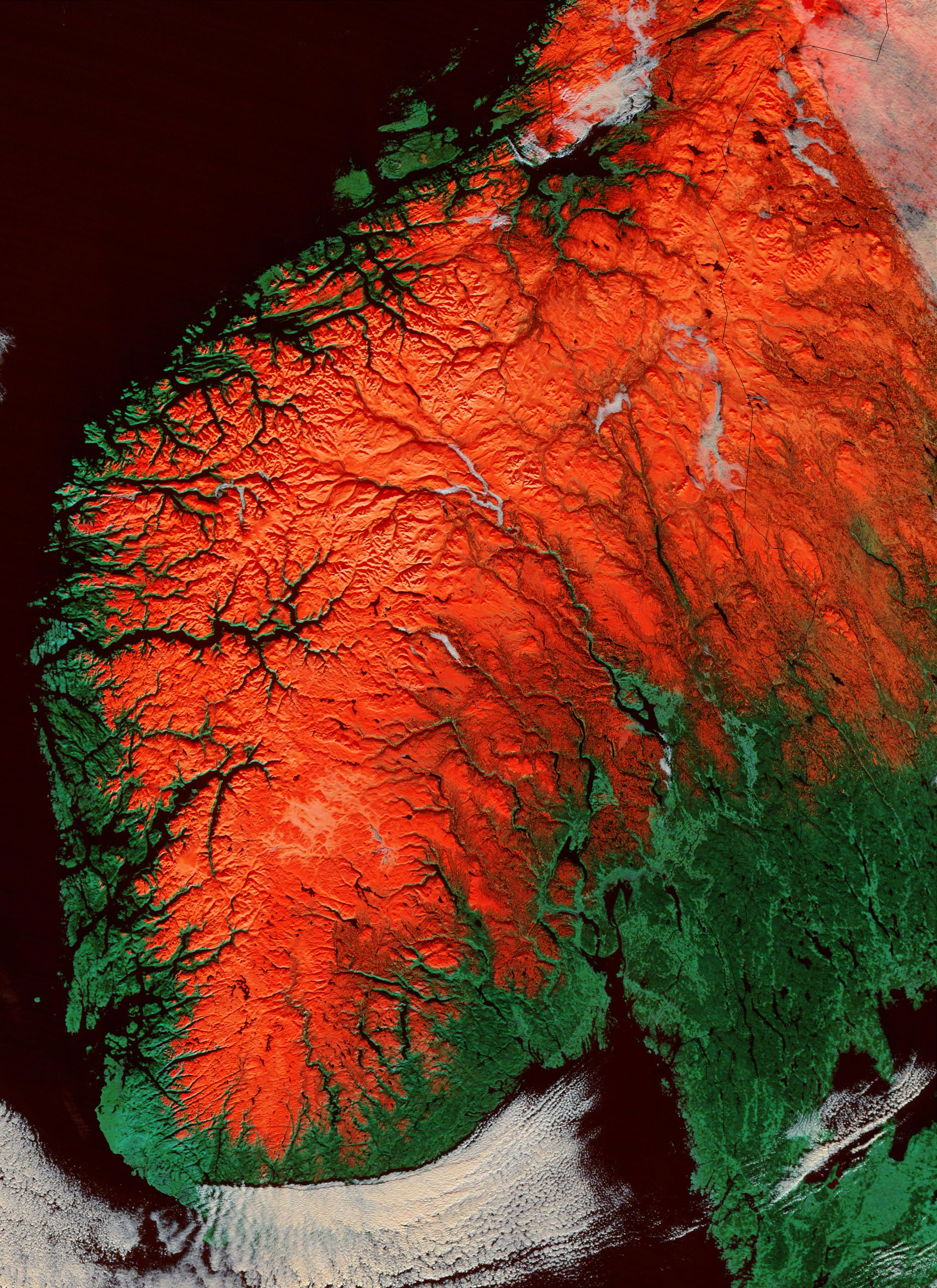
Satellite image of southern Norway, higher areas shown in red. Sognefjord and Hardangerfjord are visible in the west, and Oslofjord is seen in the southeast. Trondheimsfjord (some white clouds) is in the north, with Hitra and Frøya islands at the mouth.

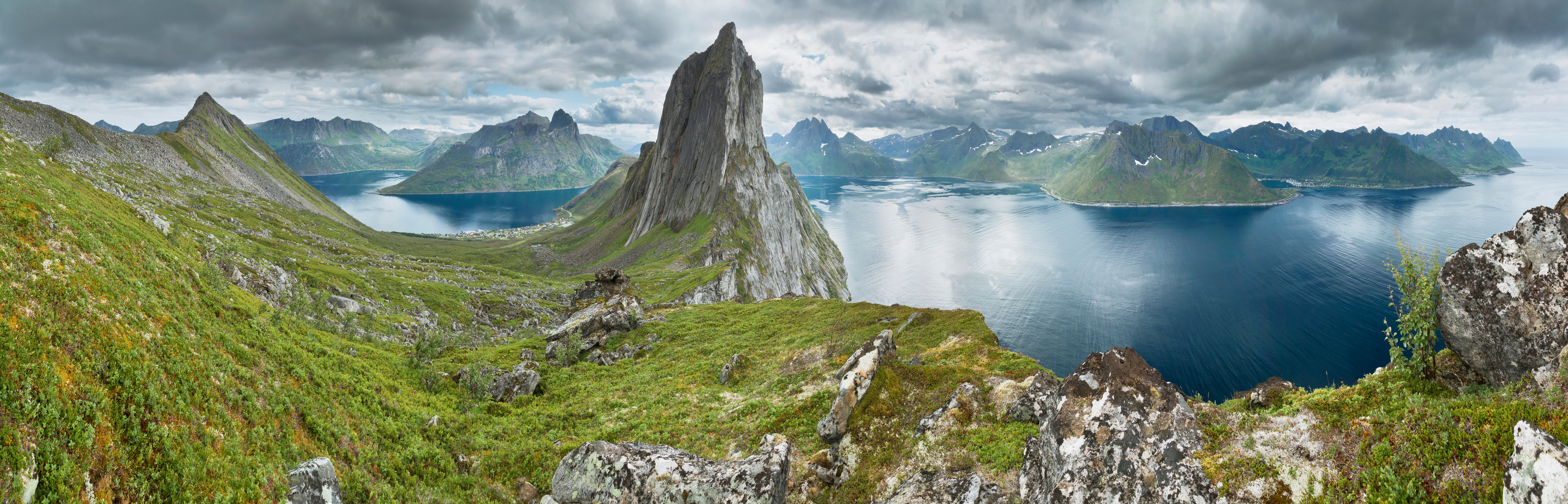
View from a ridge between Segla and Hesten, Senja, Norway

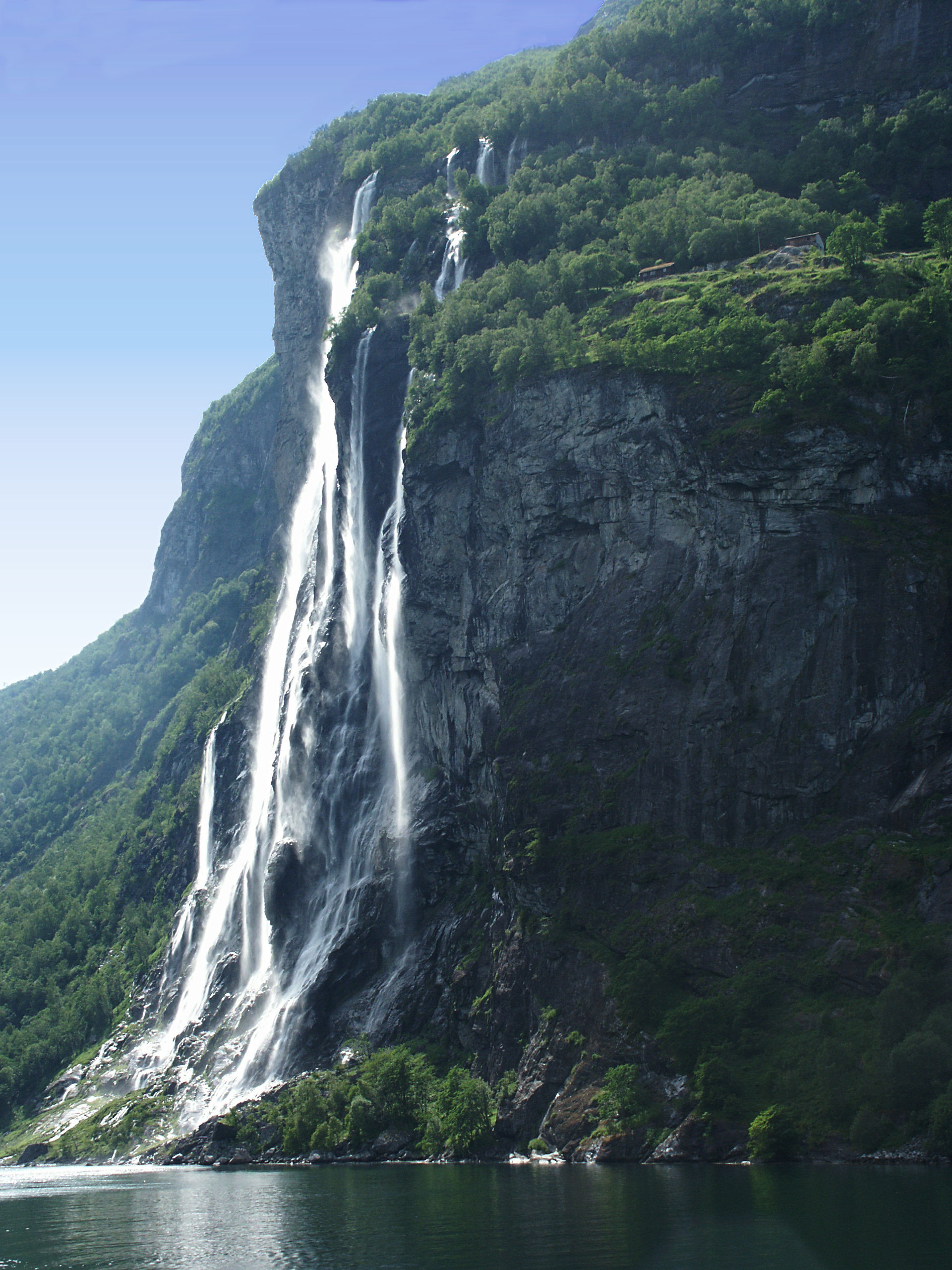
Waterfalls are common along the western part of the mountain chain, here represented by The Seven Sisters in Geiranger

=== Overview ===
Mainland Norway comprises an extensive range of natural variation, given its moderate size, including both terrestrial, marine, limnic and snow and ice ecosystems. Norway has a high mineral and bedrock diversity, and high diversity of landforms. Major landscape types include inland hills and mountains, inland valleys, inland plains, coastal plains, coastal fjords and coastal hills and mountains. Glaciated; mostly high plateaus and rugged mountains broken by fertile valleys; small, scattered plains; coastline deeply indented by fjords; arctic tundra only in the extreme northeast (largely found on the Varanger Peninsula). Frozen ground all year can also be found in the higher mountain areas and in the interior of Finnmark county. Numerous glaciers are also found in Norway.

The highest point is Galdhøpiggen at 2,469 metres (8,100 ft), and the lowest point is the Norwegian Sea at 0 m.

=== Mainland ===
==== Scandinavian Mountains ====
The Scandinavian Mountains are the most defining feature of the country. Starting with Setesdalsheiene north of the Skagerrak coast, the mountains are found in large parts of the country and intersect the many fjords of Vestlandet. This region includes Hardangervidda, Jotunheimen (with Galdhøpiggen at 2,469 metres (8,100 ft) a.s.l.), Sognefjell, and Trollheimen in the north, with large glaciers, such as Jostedalsbreen, Folgefonna, and Hardangerjøkulen. The mountain chain swings eastwards south of Trondheim, with ranges such as Dovrefjell and Rondane, and reaches the border with Sweden, where they have become mostly gently sloping plateaus. The mountains then follow the border in a northeasterly direction and are known as Kjølen (the "keel"). The mountains intersect many fjords in Nordland and Troms, where they become more alpine and create many islands after they meet the sea. The Scandinavian mountains form the Lyngen Alps, which reach into northwestern Finnmark, gradually becoming lower from Altafjord towards the North Cape, where they finally end at the Barents Sea.

The Scandinavian Mountains naturally divide the country into physical regions; valleys surround the mountains in all directions.

==== Southern coast ====
In southern Norway, the southern Skagerrak and North Sea coast is the lowland south of the mountain range, from Stavanger in the west to the western reaches of the outer part of the Oslofjord in the east. In this part of the country, valleys tend to follow a north–south direction. This area is mostly hilly, but with some very flat areas such as Lista and Jæren.

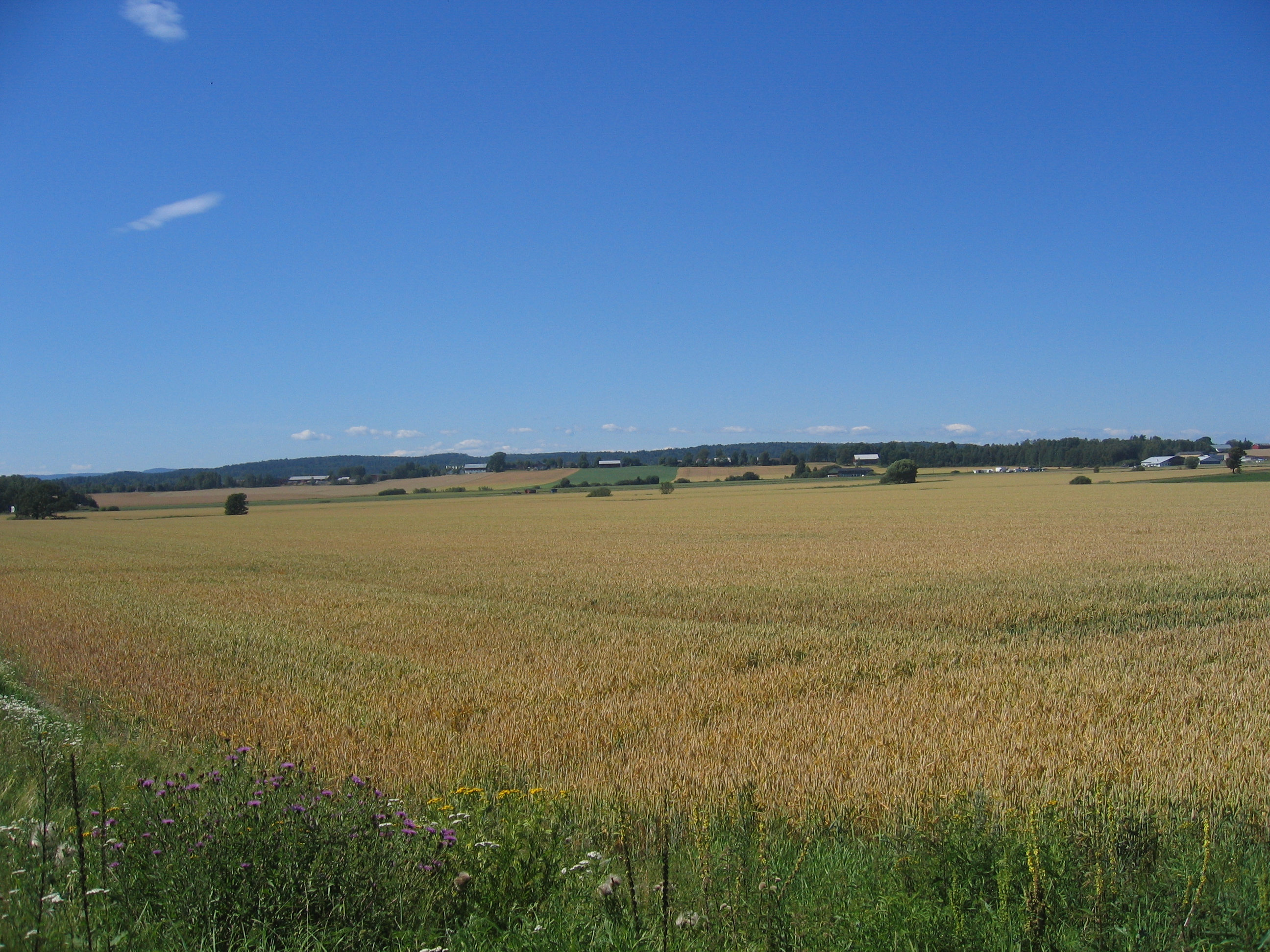
Landscape with grainfield in Tønsberg Municipality, southeastern Norway.

==== Southeast ====
The land east of the mountains (corresponding to Østlandet, most of Telemark, and Røros Municipality) is dominated by valleys running in a north–south direction in the eastern part, and in a more northwest–southeast direction further west, the valleys terminating at the Oslofjord. The longest valleys in the country are here—Østerdal and Gudbrandsdal. This region also contains large areas of lowland surrounding the Oslofjord, as well as the Glomma River and Lake Mjøsa.

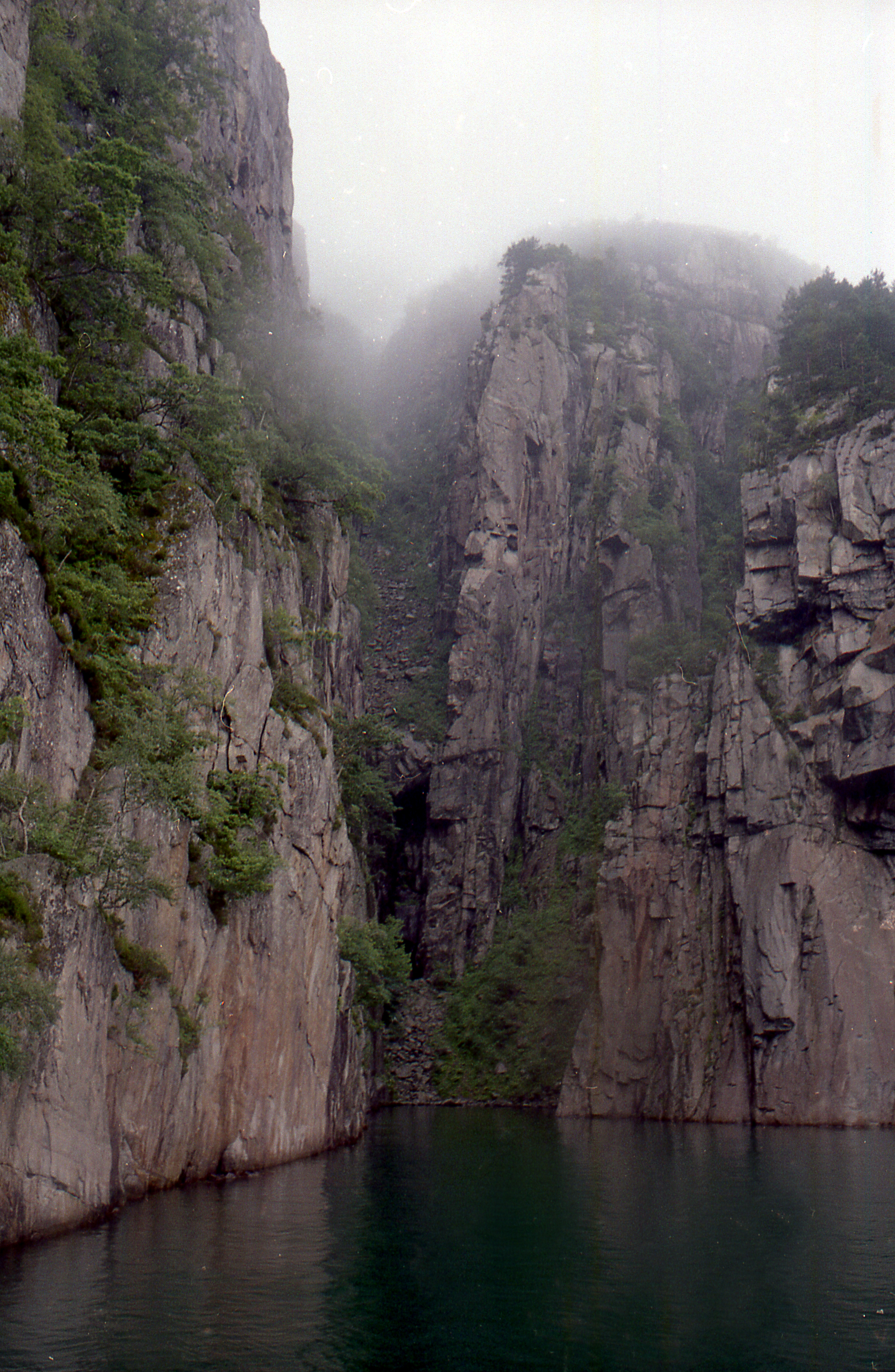
Cliffs along the Lysefjord in southwest Norway

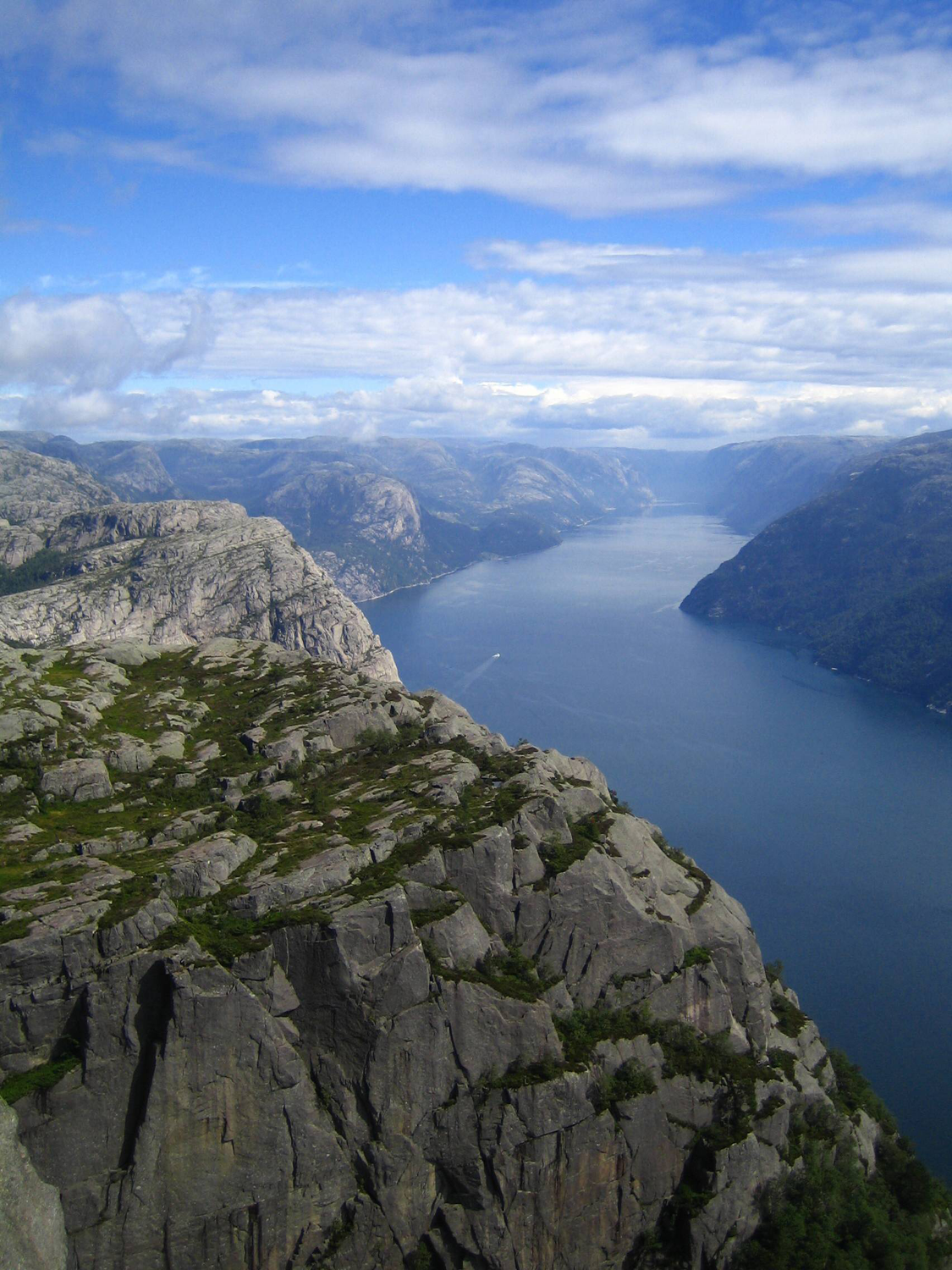
Lysefjorden seen from Prekestolen in the district of Ryfylke in Western Norway

==== Western fjords ====
The land west of the mountains (corresponding to Vestlandet north of Stavanger) is dominated by the mountain chain, as the mountains extend, gradually becoming lower, all the way to the coast. This region is dominated by large fjords, the largest being Sognefjord and Hardangerfjord. Geirangerfjord is often regarded as having the ultimate in fjord scenery. The coast is protected by a chain of skerries (small, uninhabited islands—the Skjærgård) that are parallel to the coast and provide the beginning of a protected passage for almost the entire 1,600 kilometres (990 mi) route from Stavanger to Nordkapp. In the south, fjords and most valleys generally run in a west–east direction, and, in the north, in a northwest–southeast direction.

==== Trondheim region ====
The land north of Dovre Municipality (corresponding to Trøndelag county, except Røros Municipality) comprises a more gentle landscape with more rounded shapes and mountains, and with valleys terminating at the Trondheimsfjord, where they open up onto a large lowland area. Further north is the valley of Namdalen, opening up in the Namsos area. However, the Fosen peninsula and the most northern coast (Leka Municipality) is dominated by higher mountains and narrower valleys.

==== Northern fjords ====
The land further north in Northern Norway (corresponding to Nordland, Troms, and northwestern Finnmark) is again dominated by steep mountains going all the way to the coast and by numerous fjords. The fjords and valleys generally lie in a west–east direction in the southern part of this area, and a more northwest–southeast direction further north. The Saltfjellet mountain range is an exception, as the valley runs in a more north–south direction from these mountains. This long, narrow area includes many large islands, such as Lofoten, Vesterålen, and Senja.

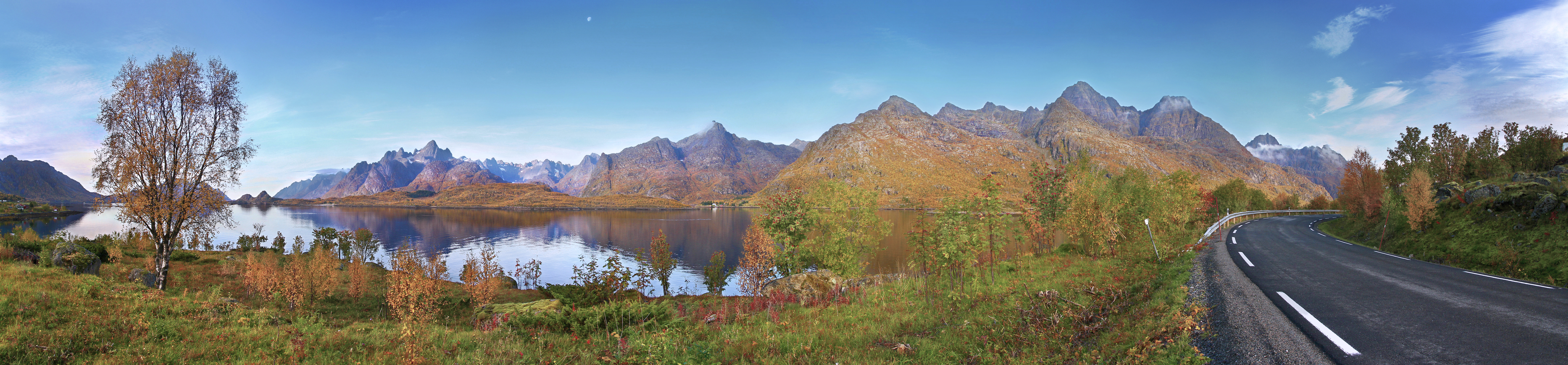
Raftsundet in September, Northern Norway

==== Far northeast ====
The interior and the coast east of Nordkapp (corresponding to Finnmarksvidda and eastern Finnmark) is less dominated by mountains, and is mostly below 400 m (1,300 ft). The interior is dominated by the large Finnmarksvidda plateau. There are large, wide fjords running in a north–south direction. This coast lacks the small islands, or skerries, typical of the Norwegian coast. Furthest to the east, the Varangerfjord runs in an east–west direction and is the only large fjord in the country whose mouth is to the east.

=== Arctic islands ===
==== Svalbard ====
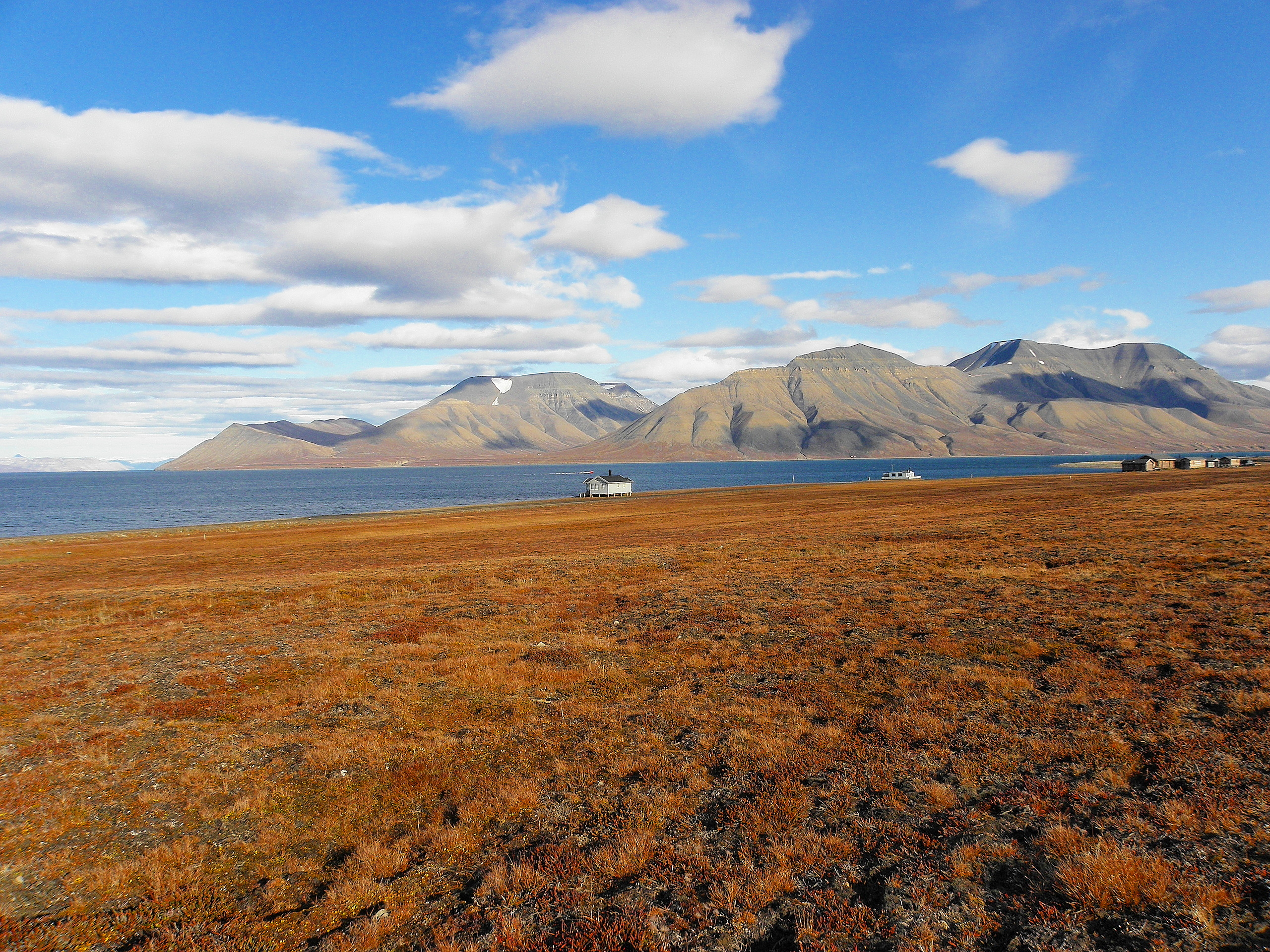
Svalbard tundra

Further north, in the Arctic Ocean, lies the Svalbard archipelago, which is also dominated by mountains that are mostly covered by large glaciers, especially in the eastern part of the archipelago, where glaciers cover more than 90%, with one glacier, Austfonna, being the largest in Europe. Unlike on the mainland, these glaciers calve directly into the open ocean.

==== Jan Mayen ====
To the far northwest, halfway towards Greenland, is Jan Mayen island, where the only active volcano in Norway, Beerenberg, is found.

=== Antarctic islands and claim to Antarctica ===
Norway has several territorial claims in Antarctica and on its islands. Bouvet Island is located in the South Atlantic Ocean at 54°S and mostly covered by glaciers, this island is one of the most remote in the world, inhabited only by seals and birds. Peter I Island is located in the South Pacific Ocean at 69°S and 90°W, this island is dominated by glaciers and a volcano. As with Bouvet Island, this island is regarded as an external dependency, and not part of the kingdom. Queen Maud Land is Norway's continental claim in Antarctica. The large, sectorial area stretches to the South Pole and is completely dominated by the world's largest ice sheet and with some nunataks (bare rock) penetrating above the ice. The Troll Research Station is operated by the Norwegian Polar Institute and is located on a snow-free mountain slope, the only station in Antarctica not to be located on the ice.

== Climate ==
Köppen climate zones of Norway 1991-2020 (0 °C (32 °F) isotherm for coldest month)

The climate of Norway is relatively temperate. This is mainly due to the North Atlantic Current with its extension, the Norwegian Current, raising the air temperature; the prevailing southwesterlies bringing mild air onshore; and the general southwest–northeast orientation of the coast, which allows the westerlies to penetrate into the Arctic.

=== Precipitation ===
Norway is among Europe's wettest countries, but with large variation in precipitation amount due to the terrain with mountain chains resulting in orographic precipitation but also creating rain shadows. In some regions, locations with vastly different precipitation amounts can be fairly close. Precipitation is heaviest in late autumn and winter along the coast, while April to June is the driest. The innermost parts of the long fjords are somewhat drier. The regions east of the mountain chain (including Oslo) have a more continental climate with generally less precipitation, and precipitation peaks in summer and early autumn, while winter and spring tend to be driest. A large area in the interior of Finnmark receive less than 450 mm (17.7 in) of precipitation annually. Some valleys surrounded by mountains get very scarce precipitation, and often need irrigation in summer.

=== Temperature ===
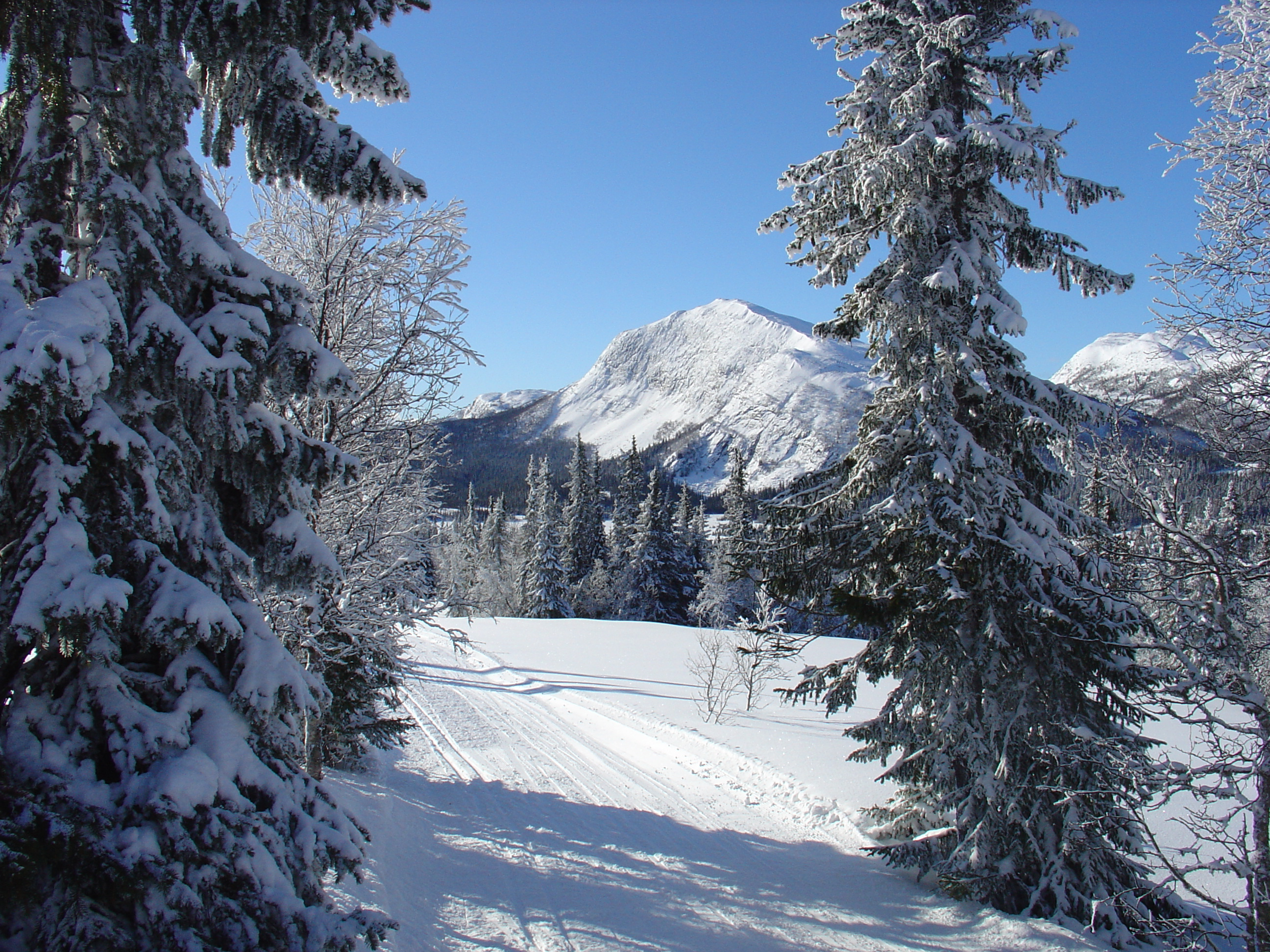
The inland valleys have reliable snow cover in winter; as here in Sigdal Municipality. Due to inversion, the valley floor is often colder than the hillsides above during winter.

The coast experiences milder winters than other areas at the same latitudes. The average temperature difference between the coldest month and the warmest is only 10–15 °C (18–27 °F) in coastal areas. The differences of inland areas are larger, with a maximum difference of 28 °C (50 °F) in Karasjok.

Bø Municipality is the most northerly location in the world where all winter months have mean temperatures above 0 °C (32 °F). Temperature differences between the north and south are greatest in the spring; this is also the time of year when daytime and nighttime temperatures differ the most. Inland valleys and the innermost fjord areas have less wind and see the warmest summer days. Inland areas reach their peak warmth around mid-July and coastal areas by the first half of August. Humidity is usually low in summer.

The North Atlantic Current splits in two over the northern part of the Norwegian Sea, one branch going east into the Barents Sea and the other going north along the west coast of Spitsbergen. This modifies the Arctic polar climate somewhat and results in open water throughout the year at higher latitudes than any other place in the Arctic. On the eastern coast of the Svalbard archipelago, the sea used to be frozen during most of the year, but warming has led to open waters lasting noticeably longer. Atlantic lows bringing mild winds in winter further warmed by foehn can give warm temperatures in narrow fjords in winter, Compared to coastal areas, inland valleys and the innermost fjord areas have larger diurnal temperature variations, especially in spring and summer.

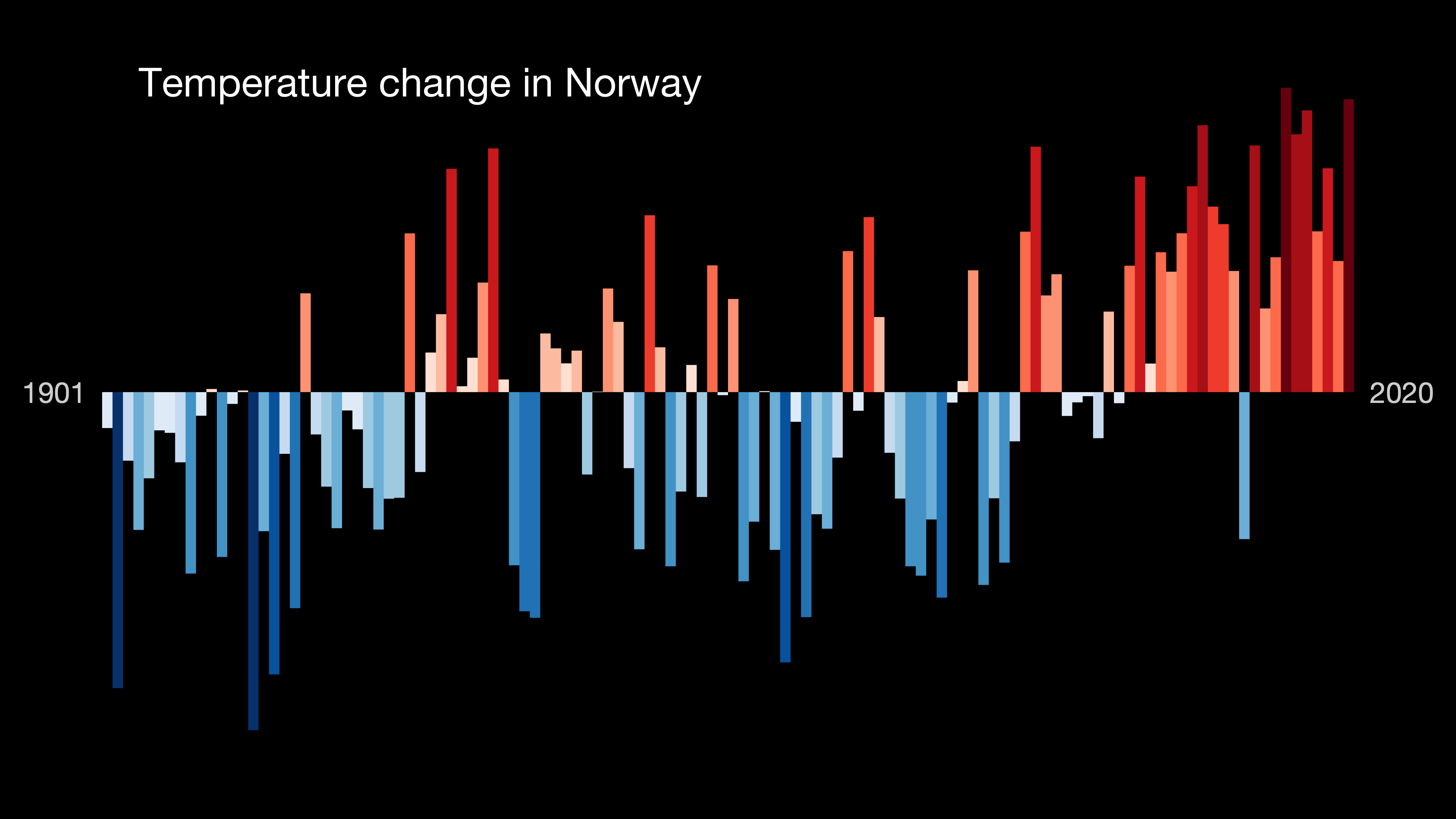
Temperature in Norway 1901-2020

All populated areas of the Norwegian mainland have temperate or subarctic climates (Köppen groups C and D). Svalbard and Jan Mayen have a polar climate (Köppen group E). As a consequence of warming since 1990, summers are warmer and longer and winters are getting shorter and milder. With the new official 1991-2020 climate normal, many areas have seen their climate change to a new climate zone compared to 1961-90 normal. Snow cover has also decreased in most populated areas due to winter warming. The strongest warming has been observed on Svalbard. In addition to warming, precipitation has increased in most areas, especially in winter, increasing erosion and the risk of landslides.

Climate data for Oslo - Blindern 1991-2020 (Köppen: Cfb/Dfb) (94 m, extremes since 1900)
Month	Jan	Feb	Mar	Apr	May	Jun	Jul	Aug	Sep	Oct	Nov	Dec	Year
Record high °C (°F)	12.5 (54.5)	13.8 (56.8)	21.5 (70.7)	25.4 (77.7)	31.1 (88.0)	33.7 (92.7)	35.0 (95.0)	33.6 (92.5)	26.4 (79.5)	21.0 (69.8)	14.4 (57.9)	12.6 (54.7)	35.0 (95.0)
Mean daily maximum °C (°F)	0.1 (32.2)	1.1 (34.0)	5.3 (41.5)	11.0 (51.8)	16.7 (62.1)	20.4 (68.7)	22.7 (72.9)	21.3 (70.3)	16.4 (61.5)	9.6 (49.3)	4.4 (39.9)	0.8 (33.4)	10.8 (51.5)
Daily mean °C (°F)	−2.3 (27.9)	−2 (28)	1.4 (34.5)	6.2 (43.2)	11.4 (52.5)	15.3 (59.5)	17.7 (63.9)	16.5 (61.7)	12.1 (53.8)	6.5 (43.7)	2.2 (36.0)	−1.4 (29.5)	7.0 (44.5)
Mean daily minimum °C (°F)	−4.7 (23.5)	−4.7 (23.5)	−2.1 (28.2)	2.1 (35.8)	6.8 (44.2)	10.8 (51.4)	13.4 (56.1)	12.5 (54.5)	8.6 (47.5)	3.8 (38.8)	-0.0 (32.0)	−3.9 (25.0)	3.6 (38.4)
Record low °C (°F)	−26.0 (−14.8)	−24.9 (−12.8)	−21.3 (−6.3)	−14.9 (5.2)	−3.4 (25.9)	0.7 (33.3)	3.7 (38.7)	3.7 (38.7)	−3.3 (26.1)	−8.0 (17.6)	−16.0 (3.2)	−20.8 (−5.4)	−26.0 (−14.8)
Average precipitation mm (inches)	57.9 (2.28)	45.6 (1.80)	41.3 (1.63)	48.4 (1.91)	60.1 (2.37)	79.7 (3.14)	86.7 (3.41)	102.8 (4.05)	82.2 (3.24)	93.4 (3.68)	84.6 (3.33)	53.6 (2.11)	836.3 (32.95)
Average precipitation days	9.8	7.3	8.5	8.1	8.5	10.1	10.9	10.9	9.4	10.9	10.7	9.2	114.3
Mean monthly sunshine hours	45.1	77.6	146.5	182.0	248.0	230.3	244.1	203.8	150.1	94	50.9	40.0	1,712.4
Average ultraviolet index	0	1	1	3	4	5	5	4	3	1	0	0	2
Source: Seklima

=== Hazards and natural disasters ===
European windstorms with hurricane-strength winds along the coast and in the mountains are not uncommon. Avalanches on steep slopes, especially in the northern part of the country and in mountain areas. Landslides have been fatal, mostly in areas with soil rich in marine clay, as in lowland areas near Trondheimsfjord. Tsunamis have killed people; usually caused by parts of mountains (rockslide) falling into fjords or lakes. This happened 1905 in Loen in Stryn Municipality when parts of Ramnefjell fell into Loenvatnet lake, causing a 40-metre (130 ft) tsunami which killed 61 people. It happened again in the same place in 1936, this time with 73 victims. 40 people were killed in Tafjord in Norddal Municipality in 1934.

== Fauna ==
Due to the large latitudinal range of the country and its varied topography and climate, Norway has a higher number of habitats than almost any other European country. There are approximately 60,000 species of plant and animal life in Norway and adjacent waters. The Norwegian Shelf large marine ecosystem is considered highly productive. The total number of species include 16,000 species of insects (probably 4,000 more species yet to be described), 20,000 species of algae, 1,800 species of lichen, 1,050 species of mosses, 2,800 species of vascular plants, up to 7,000 species of fungi, 450 species of birds (250 species nesting in Norway), 90 species of mammals, 45 species of freshwater fish, 150 species of saltwater fish, 1,000 species of freshwater invertebrates and 3,500 species of saltwater invertebrates. About 40,000 of these species have been scientifically described. In the summer of 2010, scientific exploration in Finnmark discovered 126 species of insects new to Norway, of which 54 species were new to science.

The 2006 IUCN Red List names 3,886 Norwegian species as endangered, 17 of which, such as the European beaver, are listed because they are endangered globally, even if the population in Norway is not seen as endangered. There are 430 species of fungi on the red list, many of these are closely associated with the small remaining areas of old-growth forests. There are also 90 species of birds on the list and 25 species of mammals. As of 2006, 1,988 current species are listed as endangered or vulnerable, of which 939 are listed as vulnerable, 734 as endangered, and 285 as critically endangered in Norway, among them the gray wolf, the Arctic fox (healthy population on Svalbard), and the pool frog.

The largest predator in Norwegian waters is the sperm whale, and the largest fish is the basking shark. The largest predator on land is the polar bear, while the brown bear is the largest predator on the Norwegian mainland, where the common moose is the largest animal.

== Flora ==
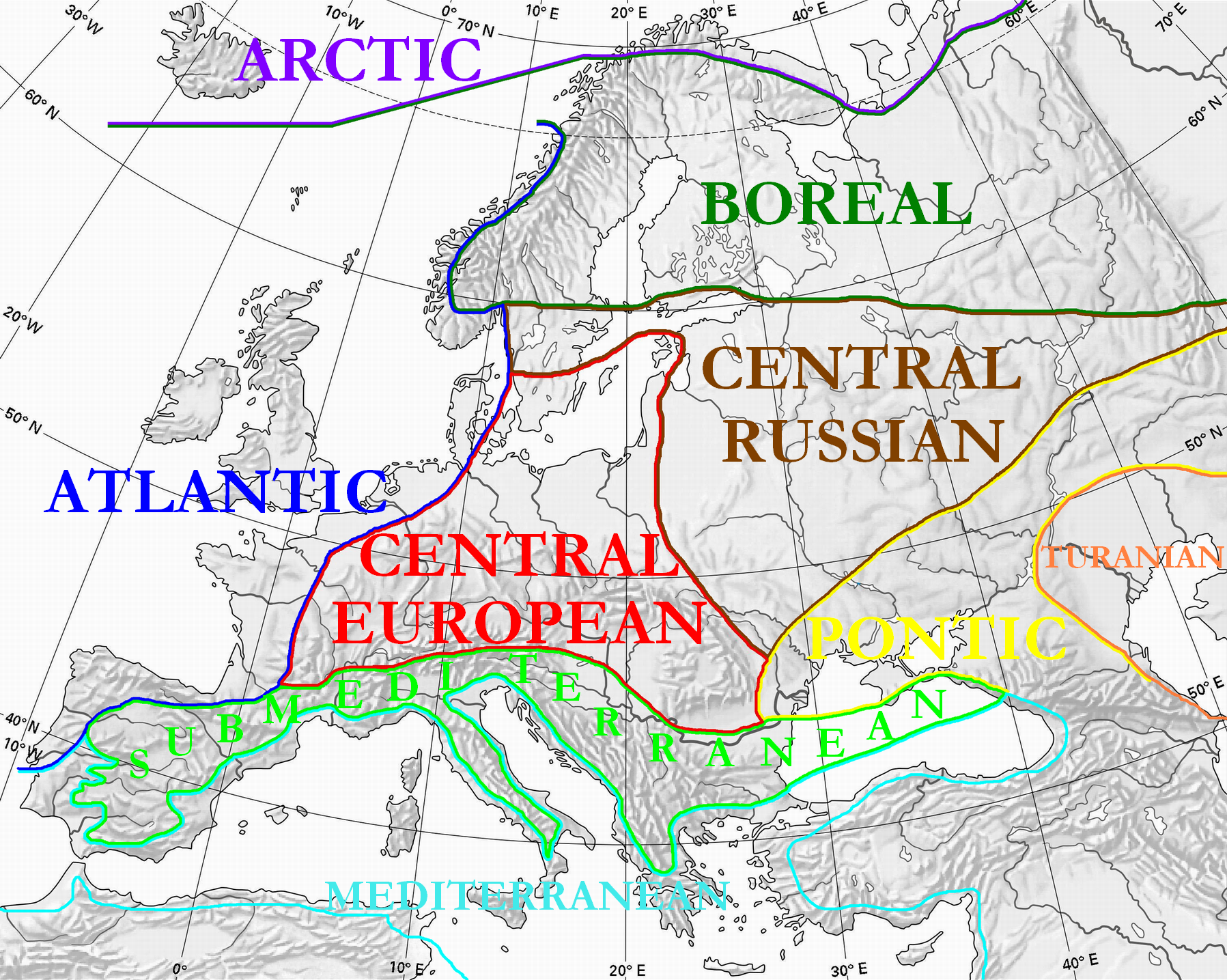
Norway occupies parts of four floristic regions in the Circumboreal Region.

Natural vegetation in Norway varies considerably, as can be expected in a country with such variation in latitude. There are generally fewer species of trees in Norway than in areas in western North America with a similar climate. This is because European north–south migration routes after the ice age are more difficult, with bodies of water (such as the Baltic Sea and the North Sea) and mountains creating barriers, while in America land is contiguous and the mountains follow a north–south direction. Recent research using DNA-studies of spruce and pine and lake sediments have proven that Norwegian conifers survived the ice age in ice-free refuges to the north as far as Andøya.

Many imported plants have been able to bear seed and spread. Less than half of the 2,630 plant species in modern Norway are native species. About 210 species of plants growing in Norway are listed as endangered, 13 of which are endemic. The national parks in Norway are mostly located in mountain areas; about 2% of the productive forests in the country are protected.

Some plants, such as holly and bell heather, are classified as western due to their need for high humidity or low tolerance of winter frost; these will stay close to the southwestern coast, with their northern limit near Ålesund. Plants classified as eastern need comparatively more summer sunshine, with less humidity, but can tolerate cold winters. These will often occur in the southeast and inland areas: examples being Daphne mezereum, Fragaria viridis, and spiked speedwell. Some eastern species common to Siberia grow in the river valleys of eastern Finnmark. There are species which seem to thrive in between these extremes, such as the southern plants, where both winter and summer climate is important (such as pedunculate oak, European ash, and dog's mercury). Other plants depend on the type of bedrock.

Mild temperatures along the coast allow for some hardy species of palm grow as far north as Sunnmøre. One of the largest remaining Linden forests in Europe grows at Flostranda, in Stryn Municipality. Planted deciduous trees, such as horse chestnut and beech, thrive north of the Arctic Circle (as at Steigen Municipality).

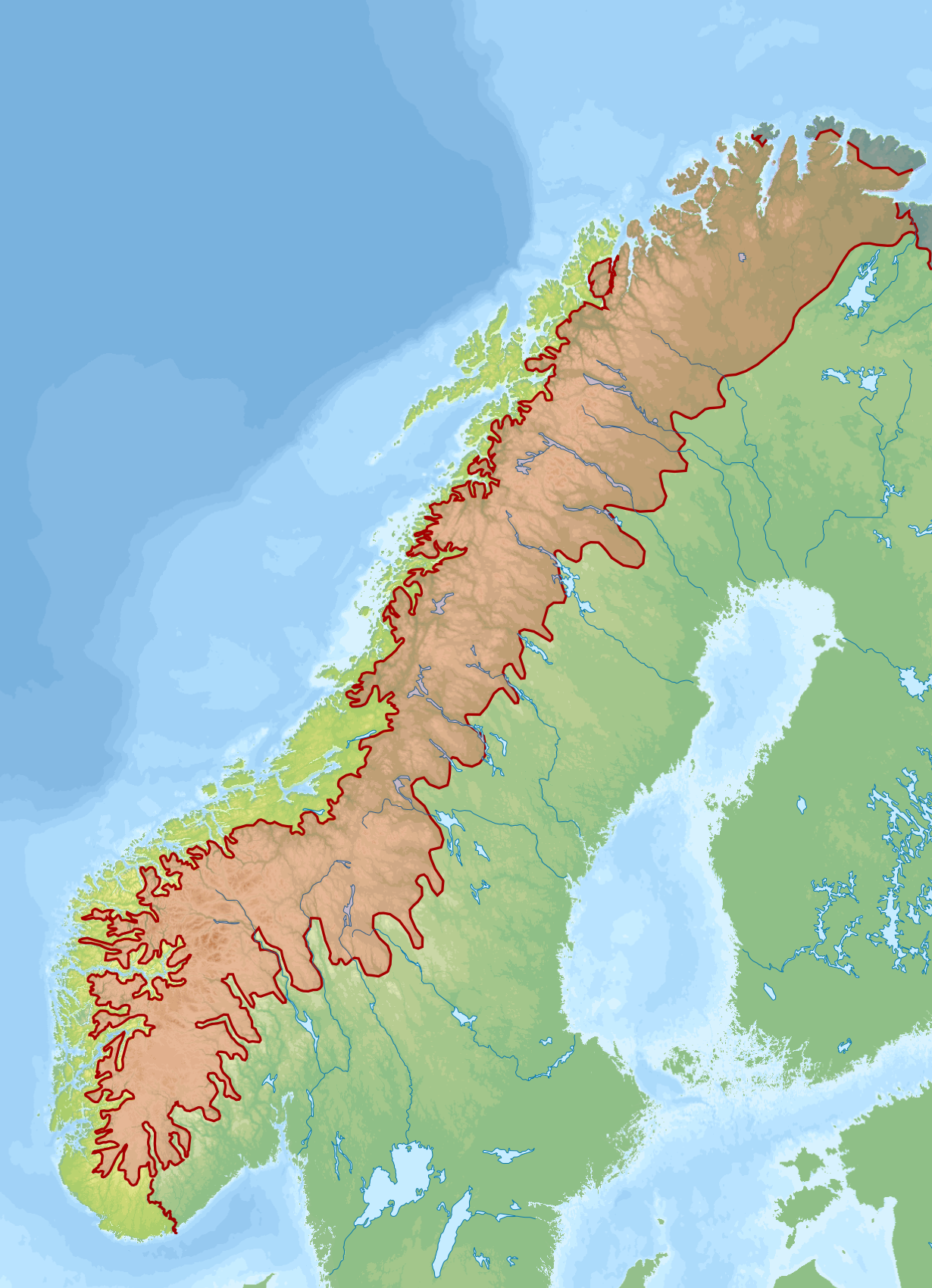
Alpine Biogeographical Region of the Scandinavian Mountains as defined by the European Environment Agency and corrected by the Norwegian Directorate for Nature Management

There is a considerable number of alpine species in the mountains of Norway. These species cannot tolerate summers that are comparatively long and warm, nor are they able to compete with plants adapted to a longer and warmer growing season. Many alpine plants are common in the North Boreal zone and some in the Middle Boreal zone, but their main area of distribution is on the alpine tundra in the Scandinavian Mountains and on the Arctic tundra. Many of the hardiest species have adapted by ripening seeds over more than one summer. Examples of alpine species are glacier buttercup, Draba lactea, and Salix herbacea. A well-known anomaly is the 30 American alpine species, which in Europe only grow in two mountainous parts of Norway: the Dovre–Trollheimen and Jotunheim mountains in the south; and the Saltdal Municipality, to western Finnmark, in the north. Other than in Norway, these species—such as Braya linearis and Carex scirpoidea—grow only in Canada and Greenland. It is unknown whether these survived the ice age on some mountain peak penetrating the ice, or spread from further south in Europe, or why did they not spread to other mountainous regions of Europe. Some alpine species have a wider distribution and grow in Siberia, such as Rhododendron lapponicum (Lapland rosebay). Other alpine species are common to the whole Arctic and some grow only in Europe, such as globe-flower.

=== Nemoral ===
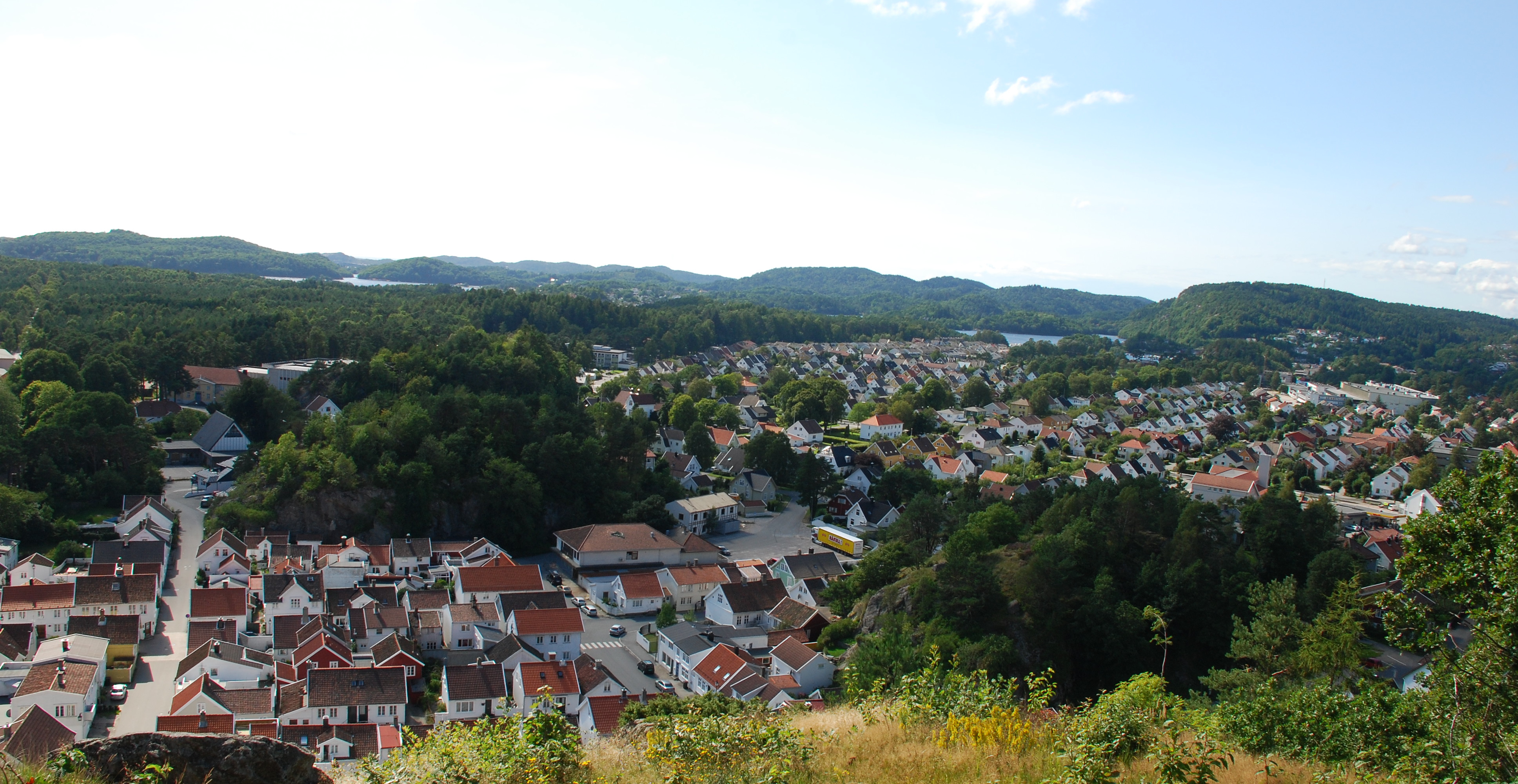
Mandal, the most southerly town in Norway, is in the nemoral zone.

A small area along the southern coast—from Soknedal Municipality in southern Rogaland and east to Fevik in Agder county (including Kristiansand)—belongs to the Nemoral vegetation zone. This zone is located below 150 metres (490 ft) above sea level and at most 30 kilometres (19 mi) inland along the valleys. This is the predominant vegetation zone in Europe north of southern France, the Alps, the Carpathians, and the Caucasus. The hallmark of this zone in Norway is the predominance of oak and the virtually complete lack of typical boreal species such as Norway spruce and grey alder, although a lowland variant of pine occurs. Nemoral covers a total of 0.5% of the land area (excluding Svalbard and Jan Mayen).

=== Hemiboreal (Boreonemoral) ===
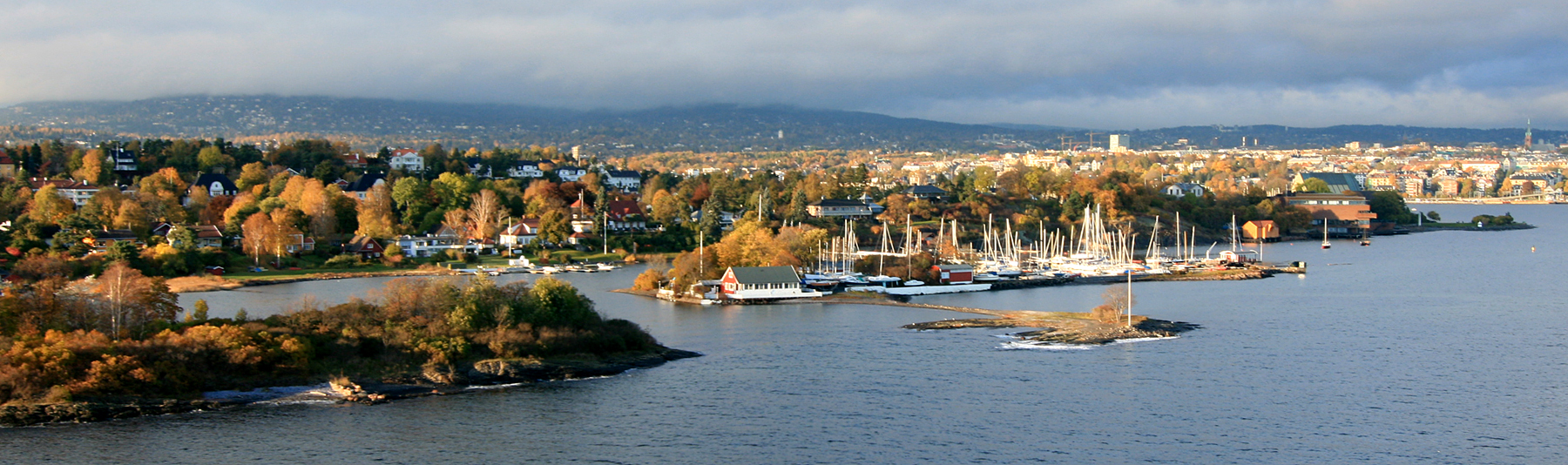
Bygdøy October 2007; the hemiboreal lowland near Oslofjord has the highest diversity due to being closest to the migration route from the south.

The hemiboreal zone covers a total of 7% of the land area in Norway, including 80% of Østfold and Vestfold. This vegetation represents a mix of nemoral and boreal plant species, and belongs to the Palearctic, Sarmatic mixed forests terrestrial ecoregion (PA0436). The nemoral species tend to predominate on slopes facing southwest and with good soil, while the boreal species predominate on slopes facing north and with waterlogged soil. In some areas, other factors overrule this, such as where the bedrock gives little nutrient, where oak and the boreal pine often share predominance. The boreonemoral zone follows the coast from Oslofjord north to Ålesund, becoming discontinuous north of Sunnmøre. In Oslo, this zone reaches to an elevation of 200 metres (660 ft) above sea level. It also reaches into some of the lower valleys and just reaches the lowland around Mjøsa, but not as far north as Lillehammer. In the valleys of the south, this vegetation might exist up to 300–400 metres (980–1,310 ft) above sea level. The zone follows the lowland of the west coast and into the largest fjords, reaching an elevation of 150 metres (490 ft) there, even to 300 metres (980 ft) in some sheltered fjords and valleys in Nordmøre, with nutrient-rich soil. The northernmost locations in the world are several areas along the Trondheimsfjord, such as Frosta Municipality, with the northernmost location being Byahalla, in Steinkjer Municipality. Some nemoral species in this zone are English oak, sessile oak, European ash, elm, Norway maple, hazel, black alder, lime, yew, holly (southwest coast), wild cherry, ramsons, beech (a late arrival only common in Vestfold), and primrose. Typical boreal species are Norway spruce, pine, downy birch, grey alder, aspen, rowan, wood anemone, and Viola riviniana.

=== Boreal ===
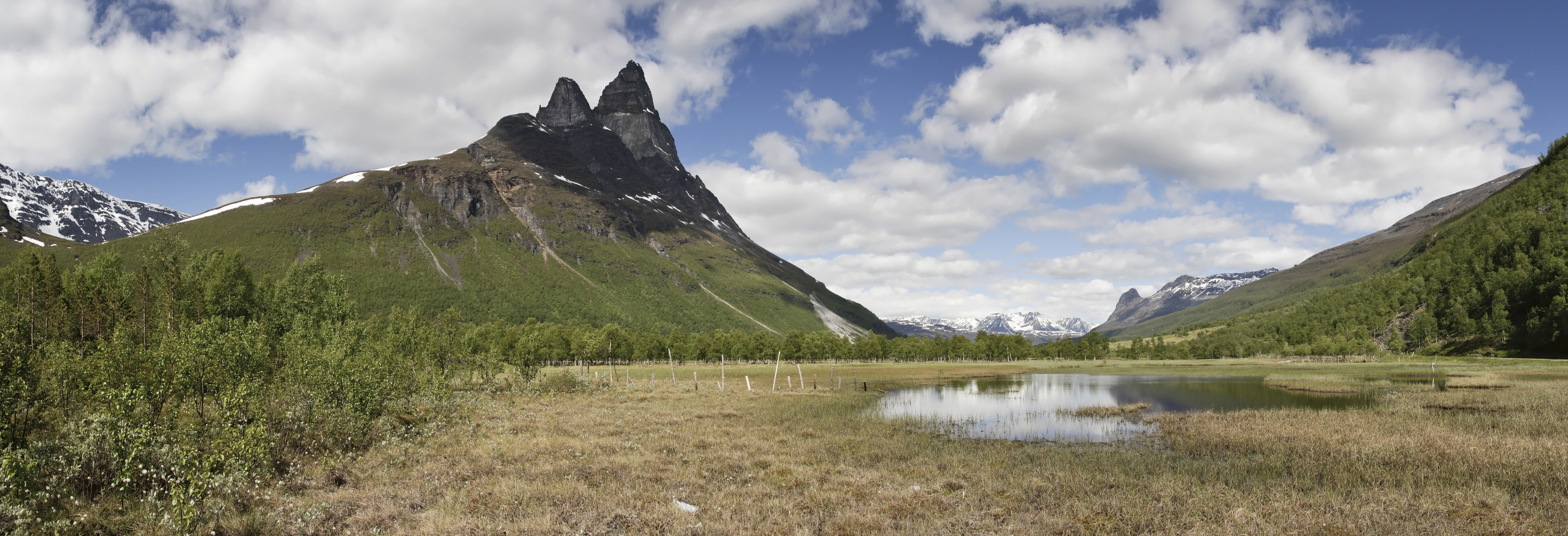
Bogs and lakes are common in the boreal zone: Signaldalen in Storfjord Municipality with Otertind mountain.

Boreal species are adapted to a long and cold winter, and most of these species can tolerate colder winter temperatures than winters in most of Norway. Thus they are distinguished by their need for growing season length and summer warmth. Bogs are common in the boreal zone, with the largest areas in the North and Middle Boreal Zones, as well as in the area just above the tree line. The large boreal zone is usually divided into three subzones: South Boreal, Middle Boreal, and North Boreal.

The boreal zones in Norway belong to three ecoregions. The area dominated by spruce forests (some birch, pine, willow, aspen) mostly belong to the Scandinavian and Russian taiga ecoregion (PA0608). The Scandinavian coastal conifer forests ecoregion (PA0520) in coastal areas with mild winters and frequent rainfall follows the coast from south of Stavanger north to southern Troms and includes both hemiboreal and boreal areas. Bordering the latter region is the Scandinavian Montane Birch forest and grasslands ecoregion (PA1110). This region seems to include both mountain areas with alpine tundra and lowland forests, essentially all the area outside the natural range of Norway spruce forests. This ecoregion thus shows a very large range of climatic and environmental conditions, from the temperate forest along the fjords of Western Norway to the summit of Galdhøpiggen, and northeast to the Varanger Peninsula. The area above the conifer treeline is made up of mountain birch Betula pubescens-czerepanovii (fjellbjørkeskog). The Scots pine reaches its altitudinal limit about 200 metres (660 ft) lower than the mountain birch.

==== South Boreal ====
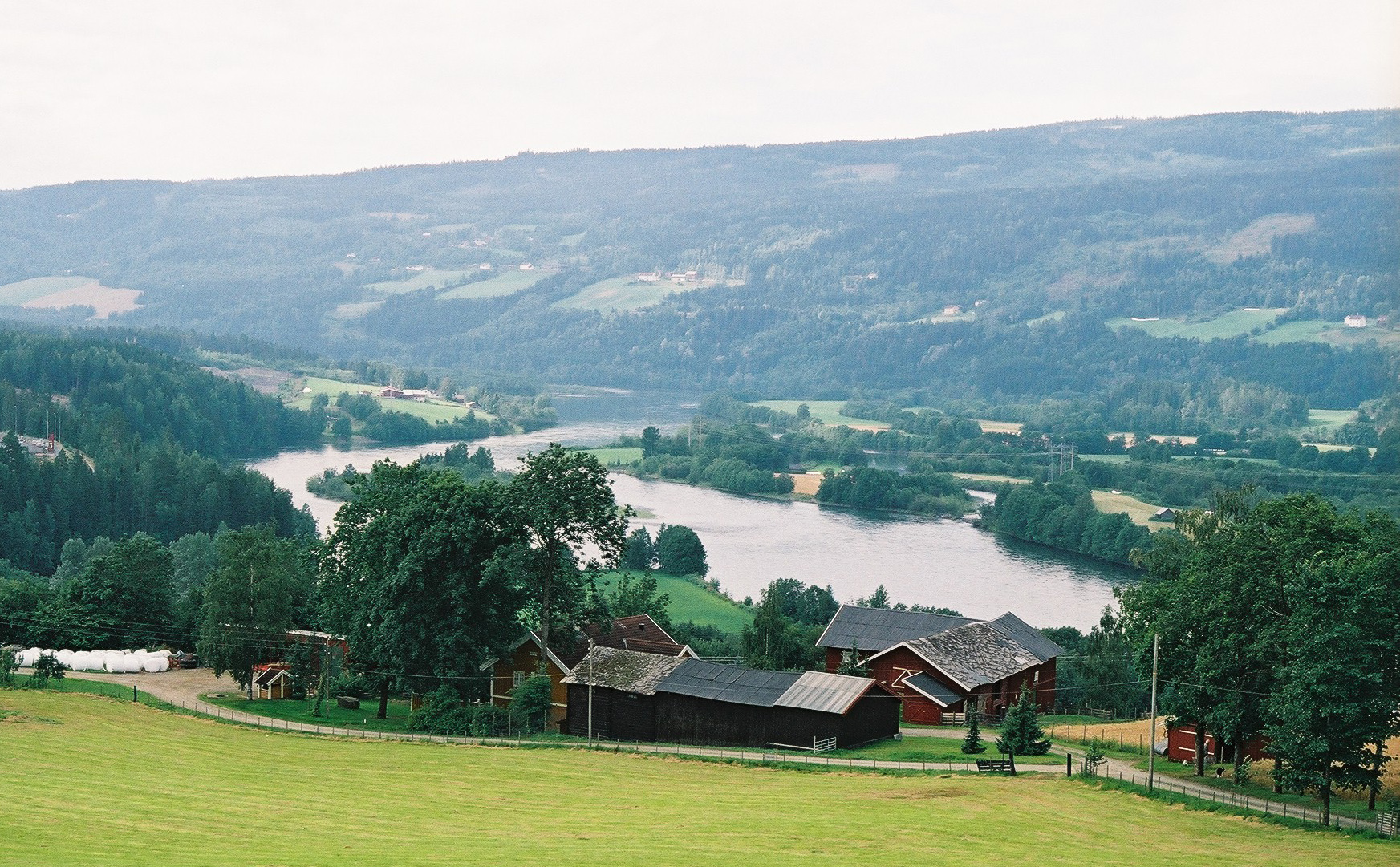
Lågendeltaet in Lillehammer, south boreal zone.

The South Boreal zone (SB) is dominated by boreal species, especially Norway spruce, and covers a total of 12% of the total land area. The SB is the only boreal zone with a few scattered—but well-developed—warmth-demanding broadleaf deciduous trees, such as European ash and oak. Several species in this zone need fairly warm summers (SB has 3–4 months with a mean 24-hr temperature of at least 10 °C (50 °F)), and thus are very rare in the middle boreal zone. Some of the species not found further north are black alder, hop, oregano, and guelder rose. This zone is found above the hemiboreal zone, up to 450 metres (1,480 ft) amsl in Østlandet and 500 metres (1,600 ft) in the most southern valleys. In the eastern valleys it reaches several hundred kilometers into Gudbrandsdal and Østerdal, and up to Lom Municipality and Skjåk Municipality, in Ottadalen. Along the southwestern coast, the zone reaches an elevation of 400 metres (1,300 ft) at the head of large fjords (such as in Lærdal), and about 300 metres (980 ft) nearer to the coast. Norway spruce is lacking in Vestlandet (Voss Municipality is an exception). North of Ålesund, SB vegetation predominates in the lowland down to sea level, including islands such as Hitra. Most of the lowland in Trøndelag below 180 metres (590 ft) elevation is SB, up to 300 metres (980 ft) above sea level in inland valleys such as Gauldalen and Verdalen, and up to 100 metres (330 ft) in Namdalen. The coastal areas and some fjord areas further north—such as Nærøysund Municipality and Brønnøy Municipality, and the best locations along the Helgeland coast—is SB north to the mouth of Ranfjord, while inland areas north of Grong Municipality are dominated by Middle Boreal zone vegetation in the lowland. There are small isolated areas with SB vegetation further north, as in Bodø Municipality and Fauske Municipality, the most northern location being a narrow strip along the northern shore of Ofotfjord; and the endemic Nordland-whitebeam only grows in Bindal Municipality. Agriculture in Norway, including grain cultivation, takes place mostly in the hemiboreal and SB zones.

==== Middle Boreal ====
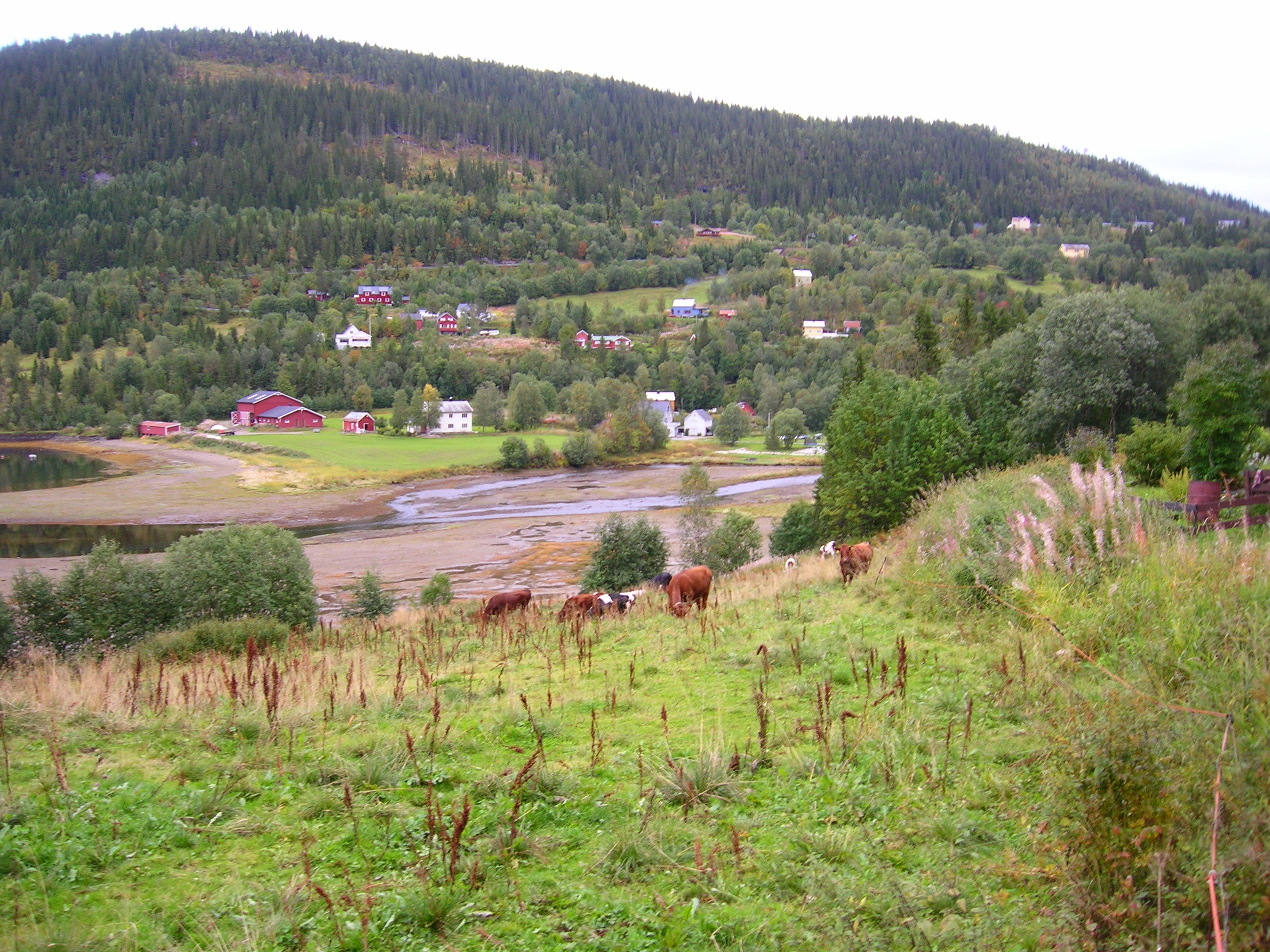
In most of Norway, the middle boreal zone is dominated by spruce forest, but with some agriculture as well. September in Elsfjord, Vefsn Municipality.

The typical closed-canopy forest of the Middle Boreal (MB) zone is dominated by boreal plant species. The MB vegetation covers a total of 20% of the total land area. Norway spruce is the dominant tree in large areas in the interior of Østlandet, Sørlandet, Trøndelag, and Helgeland and the MB and SB spruce forests are the commercially most important in Norway. Spruce does not grow naturally north of Saltfjell in mid-Nordland (the Siberian spruce variant occurs in the Pasvik valley), due to mountain ranges blocking their advance, but is often planted in MB areas further north for economic reasons, contributing to a different landscape. Birch is usually dominant in these northern areas; but pine, aspen, rowan, bird cherry and grey alder are also common. This MB birch is often a cross between silver birch and downy birch and is taller (6–12 metres (20–39 ft)) than the birch growing near the tree line. Conifers will grow taller. Some alpine plants grow in the MB zone; nemoral species are rare. The understory (undergrowth) is usually well developed if the forest is not too dense. Many plants do not grow further north: grey alder, silver birch, yellow bedstraw, raspberry, mugwort, and Myrica gale are examples of species in this zone that do not grow further north or higher up. MB is located at an altitude of 400–750 metres (1,310–2,460 ft) in Østlandet, up to 800 metres (2,600 ft) in the southern valleys, 300–600 metres (980–1,970 ft) (800 metres (2,600 ft) at the head of the long fjords) on the southwest coast, and 180–450 metres (590–1,480 ft) in Trøndelag (700 metres (2,300 ft) in the interior, as at Røros and Oppdal Municipality). Further north, MB is common in the lowland: up to 100 metres (330 ft) above sea level in Lofoten and Vesterålen, 200 metres (660 ft) at Narvik, 100 metres (330 ft) at Tromsø, 130–200 metres (430–660 ft) in inland valleys in Troms, and the lowland at the head of Altafjord is the most northerly area of any size—small pockets exist at Porsanger Municipality and Sør-Varanger Municipality. This is usually the most northerly area with some farming activity, and barley was traditionally grown even as far north as Alta Municipality.

==== North Boreal ====
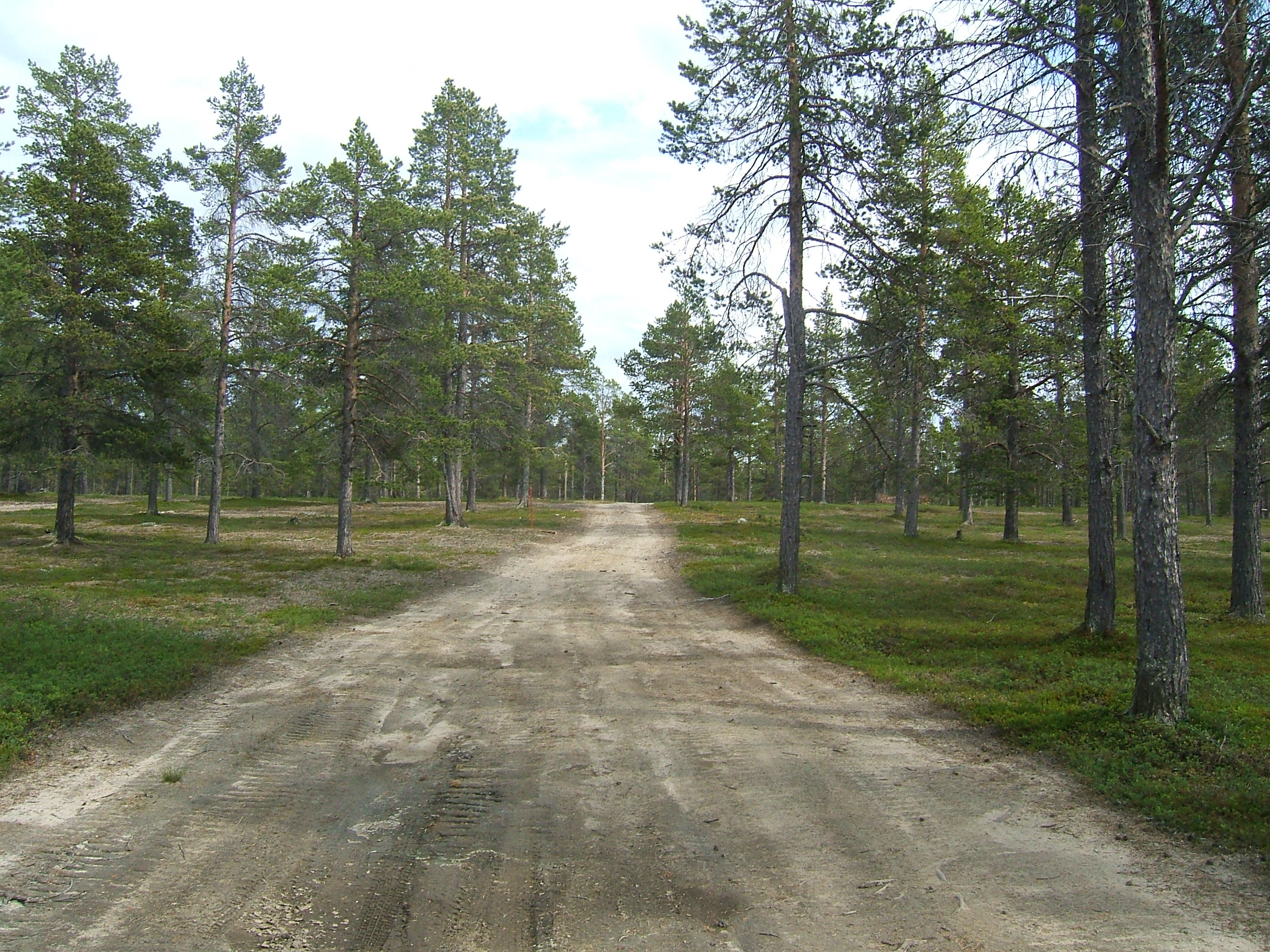
Road in the pine forest in Karasjok Municipality. The climate here has the greatest continentality and the coldest winters in Norway; north boreal zone.

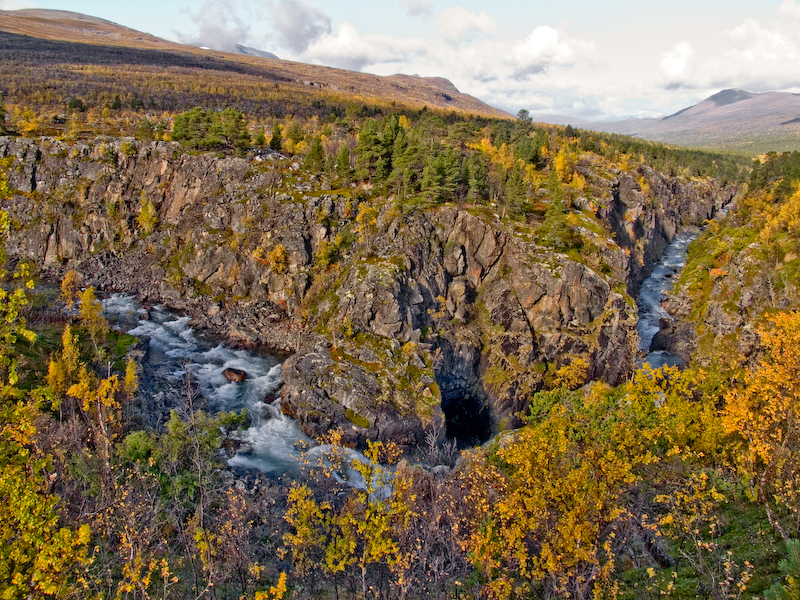
North boreal forest in Øvre Dividal National Park; the autumn colored leaves of the mountain birch, which continue upslope, pine having reached its limit.

The North Boreal (NB) zone, (also known as open or sparse taiga) is the zone closest to the tree line, bordering the alpine or polar area, and dominated by a harsh subarctic climate. There are at least 30 summer days with a mean temperature of 10 °C (50 °F) or more, up to about two months. The trees grow very slowly and generally do not get very large. The forest is not as dense as further south or at lower altitudes and is known as the mountain forest (Fjellskog). The NB zone covers a total of 28% of the total land area of Norway, including almost half of Finnmark, where the mountain birch grows down to sea level. The lower part of this zone also has conifers, but the tree line in Norway is mostly formed by mountain birch, a subspecies of downy birch (subspecies czerepanovii), which is not to be confused with dwarf birch). Spruce and pine make up the tree line in some mountain areas with a more continental climate. Alpine plants are common in this zone. The birch forest 1,320 metres (4,330 ft) above sea level at Sikilsdalshorn is the highest tree line in Norway, while a birch at 1,404 m ASL in Veodal, Jotunheimen, is the highest growing single tree. The tree line is lower closer to the coast and in areas with lower mountains, due to cooler summers, more wind near mountain summits, and more snow in the winter (coastal mountains) leading to later snowmelt. The NB zone covers large areas at 750–950 metres (2,460–3,120 ft) altitude in the interior of Østlandet; is 800–1,200 metres (2,600–3,900 ft) in the central mountain areas; but at the western coast the tree line is down to about 500 metres (1,600 ft) above sea level, increasing significantly in the long fjords (1,100 metres (3,600 ft) at the head of Sognefjord). Further north, large areas in the interior highlands or uplands of Trøndelag and North Norway are dominated by the NB zone, with the tree line at about 800 metres (2,600 ft) amsl in the interior of Trøndelag, 600 metres (2,000 ft) in Rana Municipality, 500 metres (1,600 ft) at Narvik, 400 metres (1,300 ft) at Tromsø, 200 metres (660 ft) at Kirkenes and 100 metres (330 ft) at Hammerfest (only pockets in sheltered areas). The large Finnmarksvidda plateau is at an altitude placing it almost exactly at the tree line. The last patch of NB zone gives way to tundra at sea level about 10 kilometres (6.2 mi) south of the North Cape plateau (near Skarsvåg). Areas south of this line are tundra-like with scattered patches of mountain birch woodland (forest-tundra) and become alpine tundra even at minor elevations. The trees near the tree line are often bent by snow, wind, and growing-season frost; and their height is only 2–4 metres (6 ft 7 in – 13 ft 1 in). Outside Norway (and adjacent areas in Sweden), the only other areas in the world with the tree line mostly made up by a small-leaved deciduous tree such as birch—in contrast to conifers—are Iceland and the Kamtschatka peninsula.

The presence of a conifer tree line is sometimes used (Barskoggrense) to divide this zone into two subzones, as the conifers will usually not grow as high up as the mountain birch. Spruce and pine grow at nearly 1,100 metres (3,600 ft) above sea level in some areas of Jotunheimen, down to 400 metres (1,300 ft) in Bergen (900 metres (3,000 ft) at the head of Sognefjord), 900 metres (3,000 ft) at Lillehammer (mountains near Oslo are too low to have a tree line), 500 metres (1,600 ft) at Trondheim (750 metres (2,460 ft) at Oppdal), 350 metres (1,150 ft) at Narvik, 200 metres (660 ft) at Harstad, 250 metres (820 ft) at Alta; and the most northerly pine forest in the world is in Stabbursdalen National Park in Porsanger Municipality. There are some forests in this part of the NB zone; and some conifers can grow quite large even if growth is slow.

=== Tundra ===
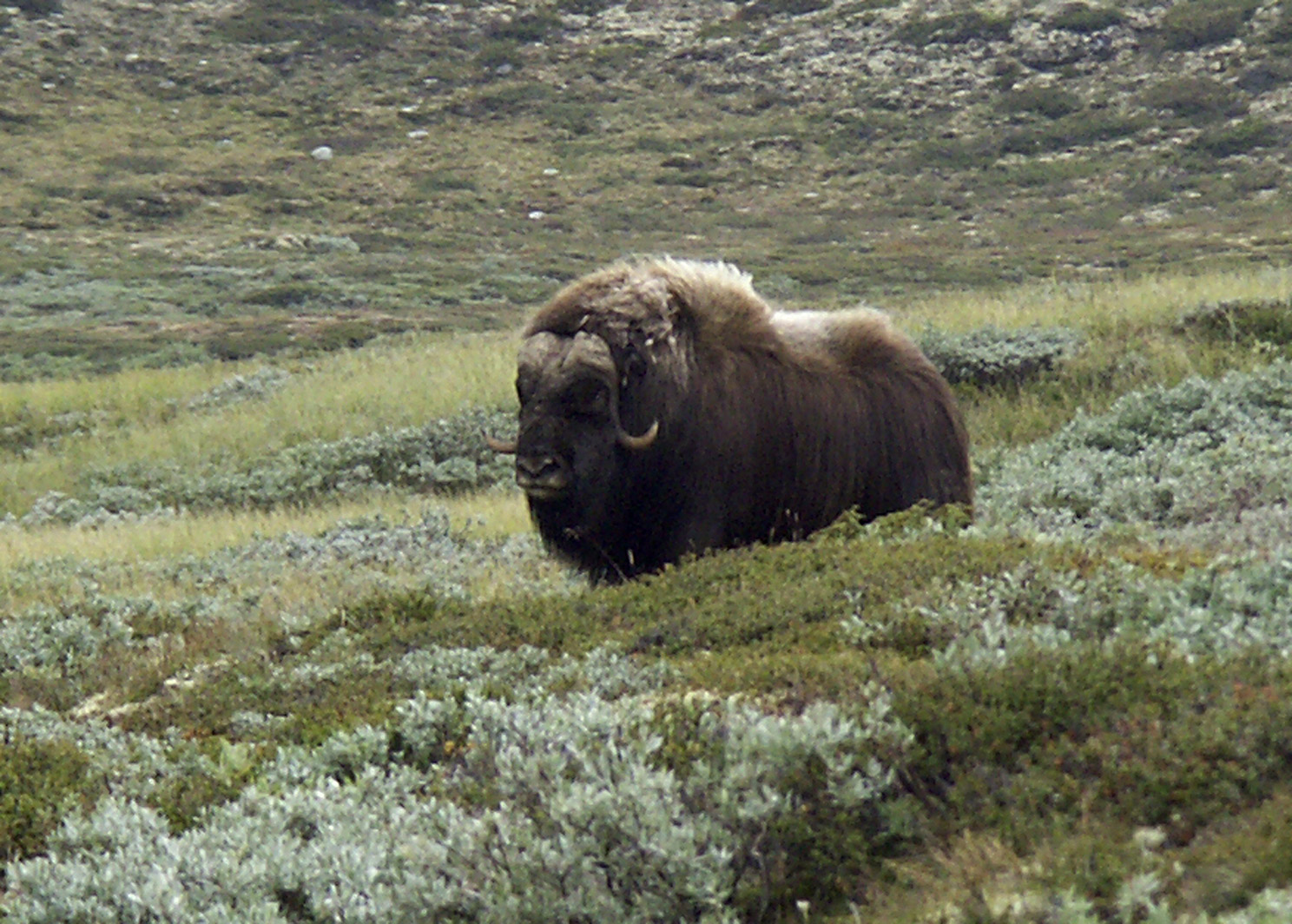
Muskox in the low alpine tundra at Dovrefjell

Alpine tundra is common in Norway, covering a total of 32% of the land area (excluding Svalbard and Jan Mayen) and belonging to the Scandinavian Montane Birch forest and grasslands ecoregion (PA1110). The area closest to the tree line (low alpine) has continuous plant cover, with willow species such as Salix glauca, S. lanata, and S. lapponum (0.5 metres (1 ft 8 in) tall); blueberry, common juniper, and twinflower are also common. The low alpine area was traditionally used as summer pasture, and in part still is. This zone reaches an elevation of 1,500 metres (4,900 ft) in Jotunheimen, including most of Hardangervidda; 1,300 metres (4,300 ft) in eastern Trollheimen; and about 800 metres (2,600 ft) at Narvik and the Lyngen Alps. Higher up (mid-alpine tundra) the plants become smaller; mosses and lichens are more predominant; and plants still cover most of the ground, even if snowfields lasting into mid-summer and permafrost are common. At the highest elevations (high-alpine tundra) the ground is dominated by bare rock, snow, and glaciers, with few plants.

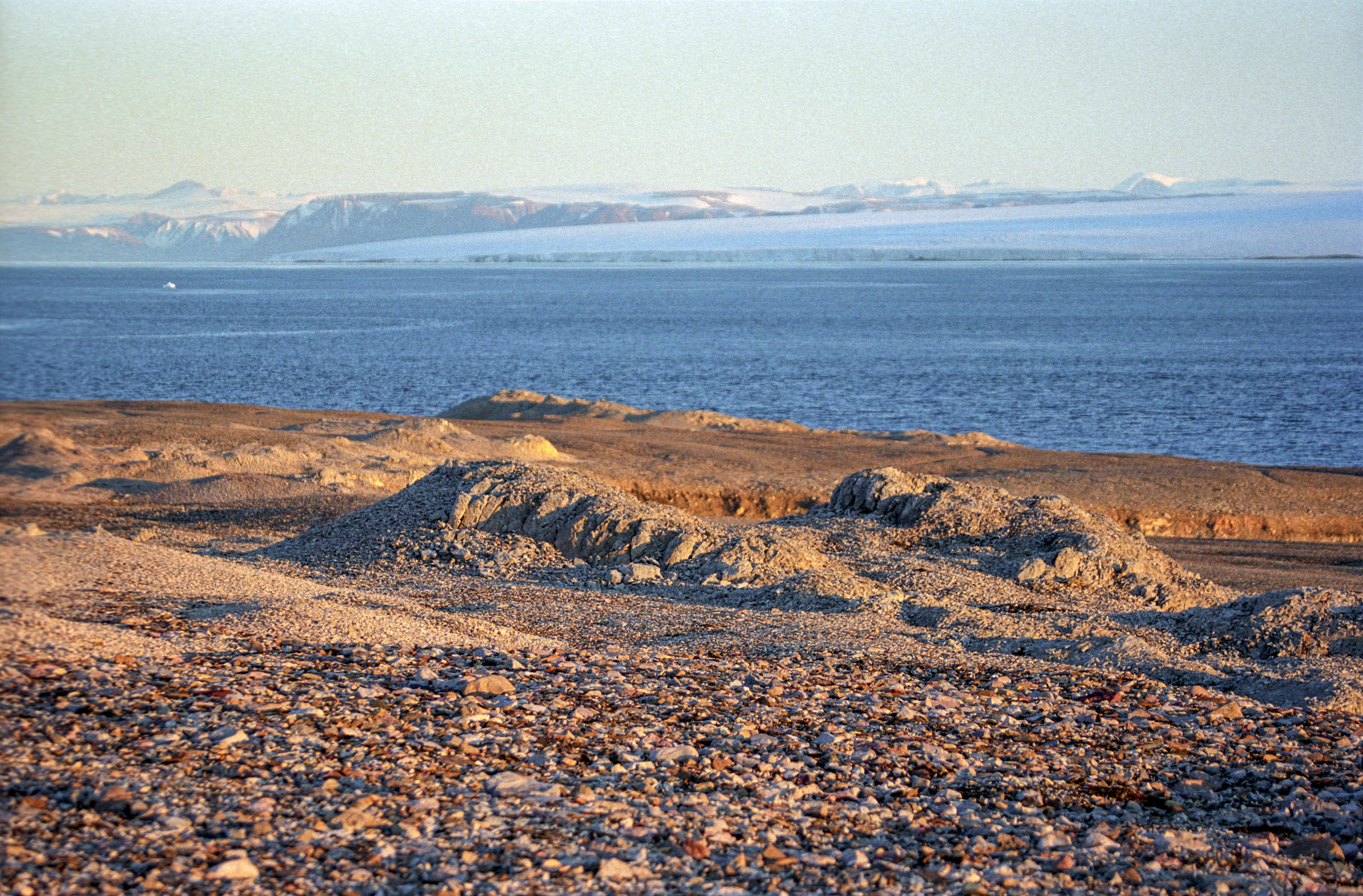
The Arctic desert on Nordaustlandet

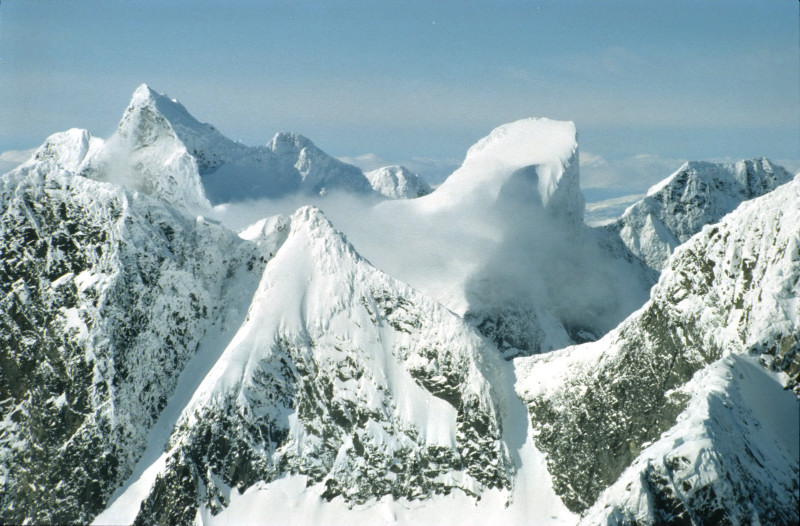
High alpine tundra in Hurrungane

The highest weather station in Norway—Fanaråken in Luster Municipality, at 2,062 metres (6,765 ft)—has barely three months of above freezing temperatures and a July average of 2.7 °C (36.9 °F). Still, glacier buttercup has been found only 100 metres (330 ft) below the summit of Galdhøpiggen, and mosses and lichens have been found at the summit.

In northeastern Finnmark (northern half of the Varanger Peninsula and the Nordkinn Peninsula) is a small lowland tundra area which is often considered part of the Kola Peninsula tundra ecoregion (PA1106). Svalbard and Jan Mayen have tundra vegetation except for areas covered by glaciers; and some areas, such as the cliffs at southern Bear Island, are fertilized by seabird colonies. This tundra is often considered part of the Arctic Desert ecoregion (PA1101). The lushest areas on these Arctic islands are sheltered fjord areas at Spitsbergen; they have the highest summer temperatures and the very dry climate makes for little snow and thus comparatively early snowmelt. The short growing season and the permafrost underneath the active layer provide enough moisture. Plants include dwarf birch, cloudberry, Svalbard poppy, and harebell.

A warmer climate would push the vegetation zones significantly northwards and to higher elevations.

== Natural resources ==
In addition to oil and natural gas, hydroelectric power, and fish and forest resources, Norway has reserves of ferric and nonferric metal ores. Many of these have been exploited in the past but whose mines are now idle because of low-grade purity and high operating costs. Europe's largest titanium deposits are near the southwest coast. Coal is mined in the Svalbard islands.

Norway's resources include petroleum, copper, natural gas, pyrites, nickel, iron ore, zinc, lead, fish, lumber, and hydropower.

== Land use ==
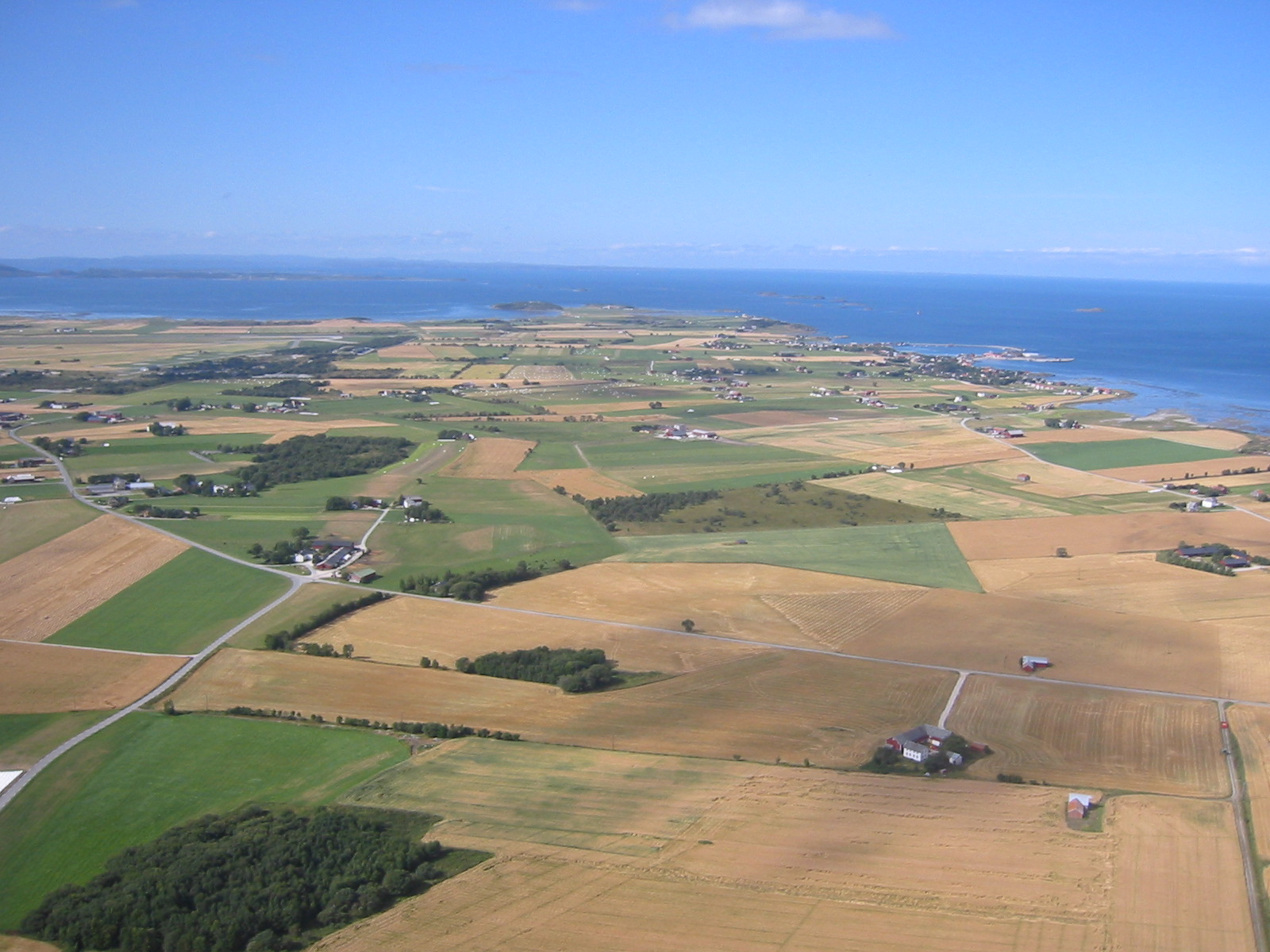
Coastal lowland near the Trondheimsfjord.

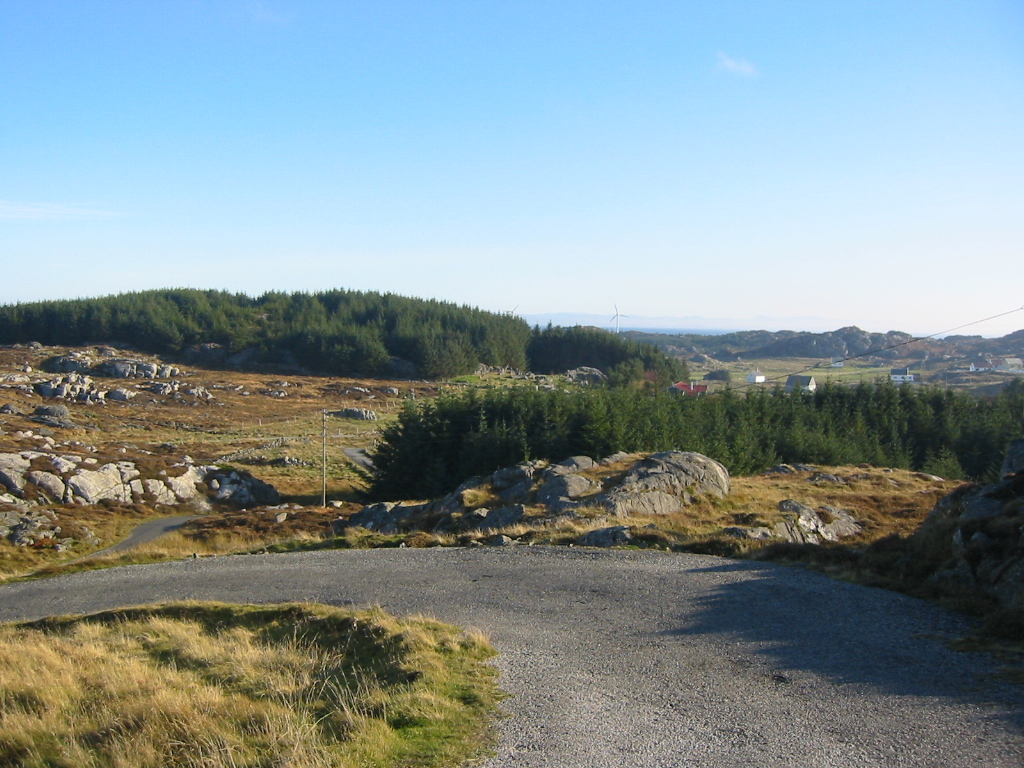
Coastal heath at Utsira, partly reforested with non-native conifers

Only 3.5% of Norway's land is considered arable land. 0% of it used for permanent crops and permanent pastures. A 1993 estimate assessed Norway's irrigated land at about 970 km^{2} (370 sq mi). 38% of land area is covered by forests; 21% by conifer forest, and 17% by deciduous forest. The remaining land is made of mountains and heaths (46%), bogs and wetlands (6.3%), lakes and rivers (5.3%), and urban areas (1.1%). Over time, wilderness areas have decreased due to human intervention. In 2008, Environment Norway (Miljøstatus) referred changing land use as one of the most important factors for endangered species and declining biodiversity.

== Environmental concerns ==
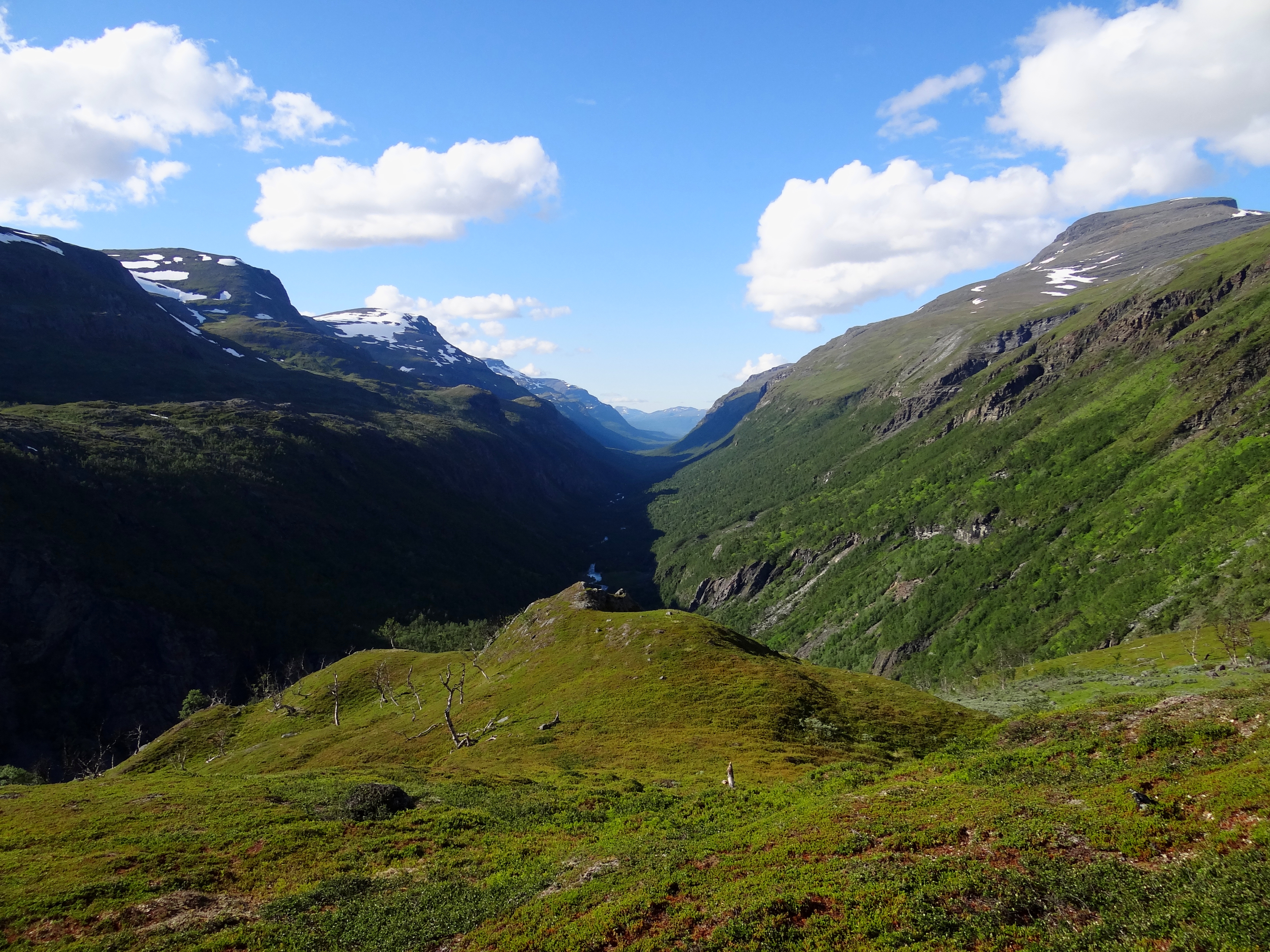
Norway has established several new national parks the last years. Sørdalen valley (canyon) in Rohkunborri National Park.

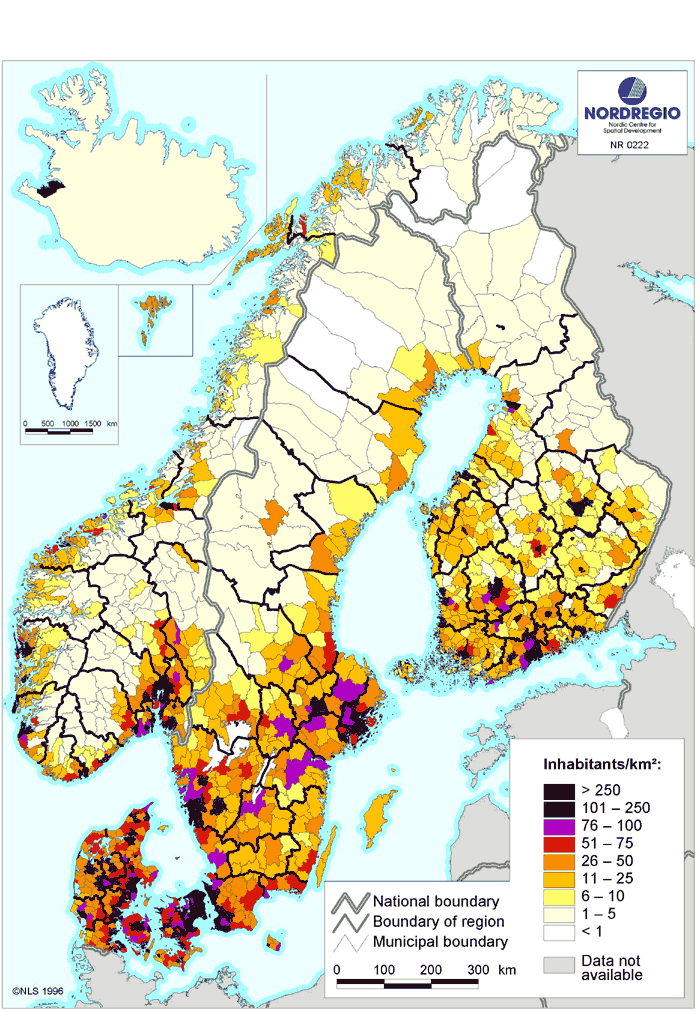
Except for Denmark and some urban areas, population density in the Nordic countries is low, especially in the north.

Environmental concerns in Norway include how to cut greenhouse gas emissions, pollution of the air and water, loss of habitat, damage to cold-water coral reefs from trawlers, and salmon fish farming threatening the wild salmon by spawning in the rivers, thereby diluting the fish DNA. Acid rain has damaged lakes, rivers and forests, especially in the southernmost part of the country, and most wild salmon populations in Sørlandet have died. Due to lower emissions in Europe, acid rain in Norway has decreased by 40% from 1980 to 2003. Another concern is a possible increase in extreme weather. In the future, climate models predict increased precipitation, especially in the areas with currently high precipitation, and also predict more episodes with heavy precipitation within a short period, which can cause landslides and local floods. Winters will probably be significant milder, and the sea-ice cover in the Arctic Ocean might melt altogether in summer, threatening the survival of the polar bear on Svalbard. Both terrestrial and aquatic species are expected to shift northwards, and this is already observed for some species; the growing red deer population is spreading northwards and eastwards, with 2008 being the first hunting season which saw more red deer (35,700) than moose shot. Migratory birds are arriving earlier; trees are coming into leaf earlier; mackerel are becoming common in summer off the coast of Troms. The total number of species in Norway are expected to rise due to new species arriving. Norwegians are statistically among the most worried when it comes to global warming and its effects, even if Norway is among the countries expected to be least negatively affected by global warming, with some possible gains.

=== International agreements ===
Norway is a party to:

- Protocol on Environmental Protection to the Antarctic Treaty
- Antarctic Treaty System
- United Nations Framework Convention on Climate Change,
- Environmental Modification Convention,
- Law of the Sea
- London Convention on the Prevention of Marine Pollution by Dumping of Wastes and Other Matter
- Comprehensive Nuclear-Test-Ban Treaty
- Montreal Protocol (ozone layer protection)
- MARPOL 73/78 (ship pollution)
- International Tropical Timber Agreement, 1983
- International Tropical Timber Agreement, 1994
- Kyoto Protocol (climate change)
- ADR (road transport of hazardous materials)

== See also ==
- Geography of Europe
- Extreme points of Norway
- Districts of Norway
- List of urban areas in Norway by population
- Global warming in Norway
- List of national parks of Norway
- List of rivers of Norway
- Fjords of Norway
- Glaciers of Norway
- Islands of Norway
- Lakes of Norway
- Mountains of Norway
- Rivers of Norway
- Valleys of Norway
- Volcanoes of Norway
- Waterfalls of Norway

== Sources ==
- Tollefsrud, J.; Tjørve, E.; Hermansen, P.: Perler i Norsk Natur - En Veiviser. Aschehoug, 1991. ISBN 82-03-16663-6
- Gjærevoll, Olav. "Plantegeografi". Tapir, 1992. ISBN 82-519-1104-4
- Moen, A. 1998. Nasjonalatlas for Norge: Vegetasjon. Statens Kartverk, Hønefoss. ISBN 82-90408-26-9
- Norwegian Meteorological Institute ().
- Bjørbæk, G. 2003. Norsk vær i 110 år. N.W. DAMM & Sønn. ISBN 82-04-08695-4
- Førland, E.. Variasjoner i vekst og fyringsforhold i Nordisk Arktis. Regclim/Cicerone 6/2004.
- University of Oslo. Almanakk for Norge Gyldendal fakta. ISBN 82-05-35494-4
