= Scandinavian coastal conifer forests =

Palearctic ecoregion located along the coast of Norway

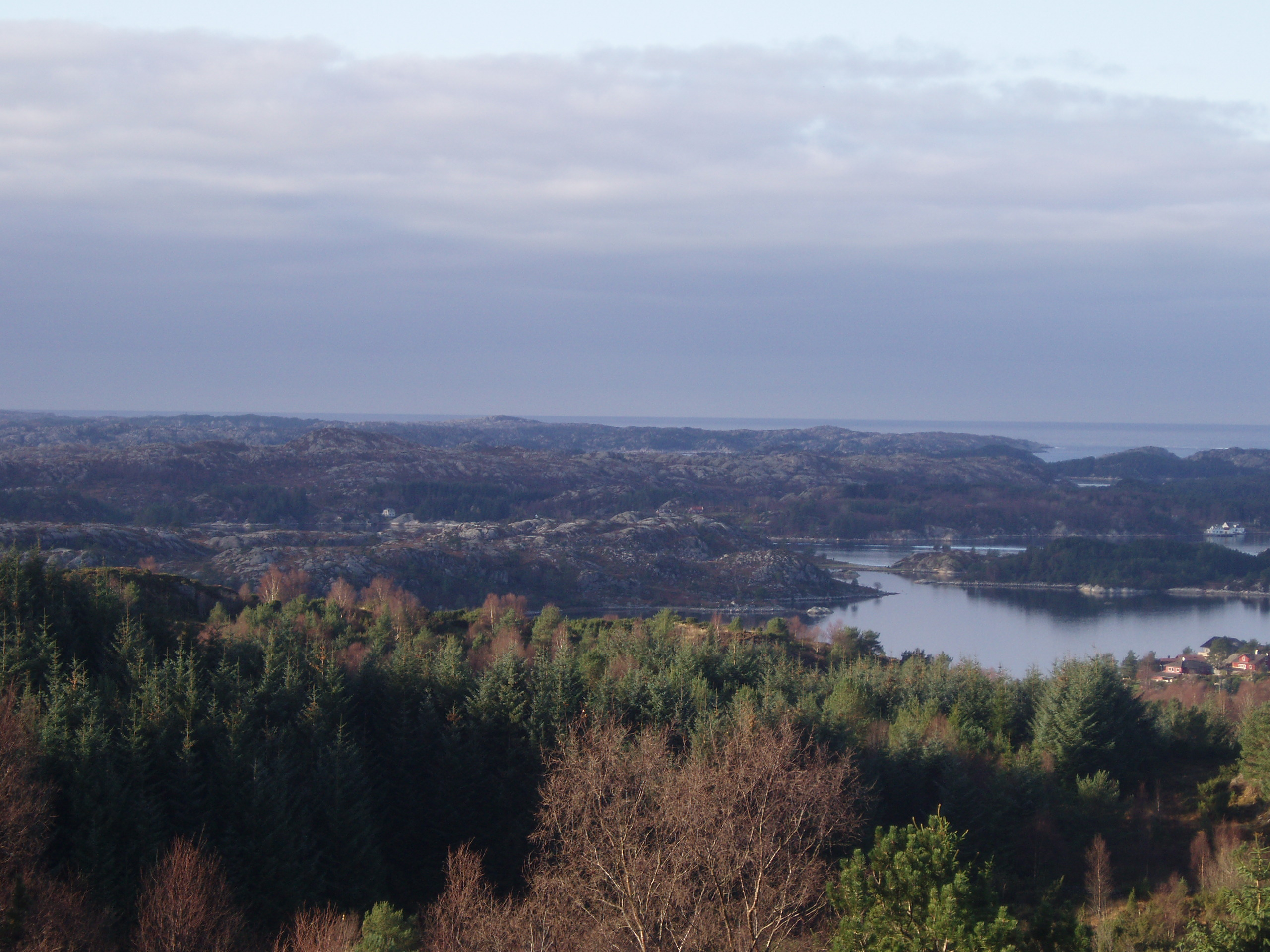
- Fitjar south of Bergen

- Ecoregion PA0520

Ecology
- Realm: Palearctic
- Biome: Temperate coniferous forests
- Borders: Sarmatic mixed forests

Geography
- Area: 19,400 km^{2} (7,500 mi^{2})
- Country: Norway
- Coordinates: 60°33′N 05°32′E

Conservation
- Conservation status: Critical/Endangered

The Scandinavian coastal conifer forests or Norwegian coastal conifer forest is a Palearctic ecoregion in the temperate coniferous forests biome, located along the coast of Norway. Within it are a number of small areas with botanical features and a local climate consistent with a temperate rainforest.

== Location and description ==
The Scandinavian coastal conifer forest is a terrestrial ecoregion as defined by WWF and National Geographic. The broad definition is based on climatic parameters and includes a long area along the western Norwegian coast from Lindesnes Municipality and north to approximately Senja Municipality (further north summers are too cool for pine in coastal areas); in essence areas along the Norwegian coast where winters are fairly mild and where precipitation is sufficient and falls all year, usually with a peak in autumn and winter. It might include areas lacking naturally occurring conifer forests (as in Lofoten, where the pine forest was cleared many centuries ago) and even islands and rocky headlands with little to no woodland or forest, as well as areas with mostly deciduous forest (aspen, silver birch and downy birch, elm, rowan, sycamore maple, hazel).

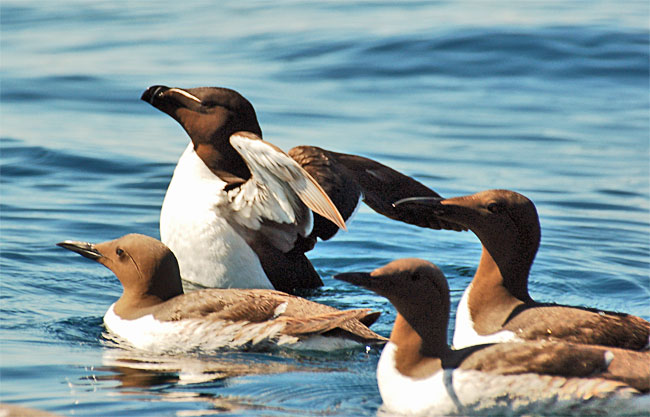
Some of Europe's largest sea bird colonies are located in this ecoregion, including Røstlandet, Lovund and Runde.

The pine trees can be very old, up to 700 years in some areas in the north (Hinnøya).

At somewhat higher elevations near the treeline in the Scandinavian Mountains is the Scandinavian montane birch forest and grasslands ecoregion. In some areas along valleys, this ecoregion meets the inland taiga belonging to the Scandinavian and Russian taiga ecoregion without mountain barriers. Examples of such valleys include the Romsdalen valley connecting Åndalsnes to Lesja and Dombås, and the Namdalen valley connecting the northern coast of Trøndelag to the cold interior with connection into Sweden. The ecoregion is naturally fragmented by fjords and mountains.

== Oceanic climate ==
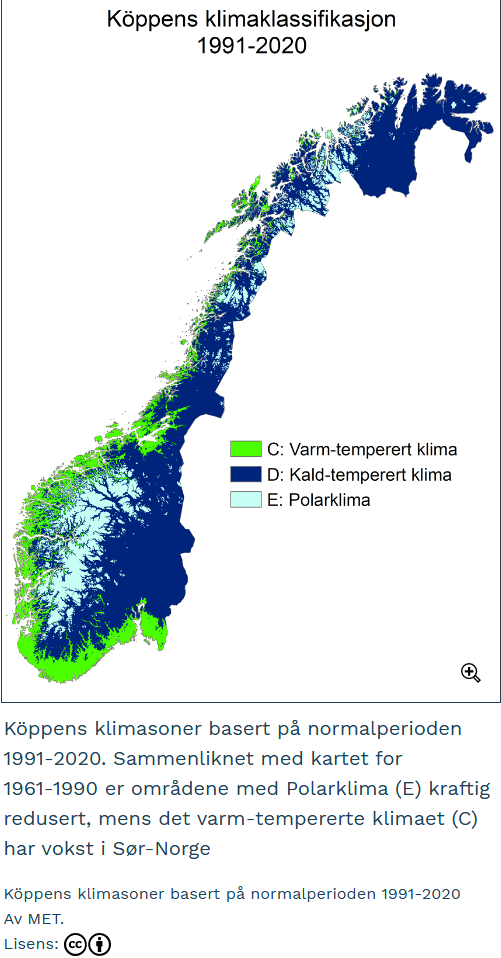
Climate zones Norway; green is oceanic climate (-3C (27F) isotherm coldest month dividing oceanic (green) from continental climate (dark blue).

This area has a growing season lasting 150–240 days (24-hr mean 5 °C threshold) and reliable precipitation, from 870 to 3,000 millimetres (34 to 118 in). July means range from 12 °C (54 °F) at some islands in the north (Andøya, Røstlandet) to 16 °C (61 °F) in sheltered fjords in the south (Kvamsøy). Average daily highs in July range from 14 to 20 °C (57 to 68 °F). Winters are often rainy and sometimes snowy (especially in northern areas), January means range from −2 to 3 °C (28 to 37 °F) with daytime highs from 0 to 5 °C (32 to 41 °F). Mean annual temperatures range from about 8.5 °C (47.3 °F) in the south (Bømlo, Stavanger, Bergen), to 6–7 °C (43–45 °F) in central areas (Kristiansund at 7.2 °C (45.0 °F); Brønnøysund at 6.6 °C (43.9 °F)), and 4–5 °C (39–41 °F) in the northernmost part (Bodø at 5.5 °C (41.9 °F); Andenes at 4.4 °C (39.9 °F)). This type of climate corresponds to Köppen type Cfb (Cfc for the northernmost islands). Temperatures and precipitation patterns are comparable to the coast of British Columbia from northern Vancouver Island and north through the Alaska Panhandle to Yakutat and Seward.

For the smaller area classified as rainforest, there are at least 200 days/year with measurable precipitation. The minimum annual precipitation given in the sources varies but is generally around 1,400 millimetres (55 in). Some of the wettest areas in this ecoregion get more than 3,000 millimetres (120 in) annually, such as Brekke at 3,495 millimetres (138 in) near the mouth of Sognefjorden, and even some areas much further nortsuch as Lurøya with 3,066 millimetres (121 in) at an elevation of 115 metres (377 ft) above sea level.

== Subregions and species ==
The lack of spruce north of the Arctic Circle (Saltfjell) and along the southwestern coast is mainly due to barriers such as fjords and mountain ranges, and planted Spruce grows well north of the Arctic Circle as in Tromsø Municipality.

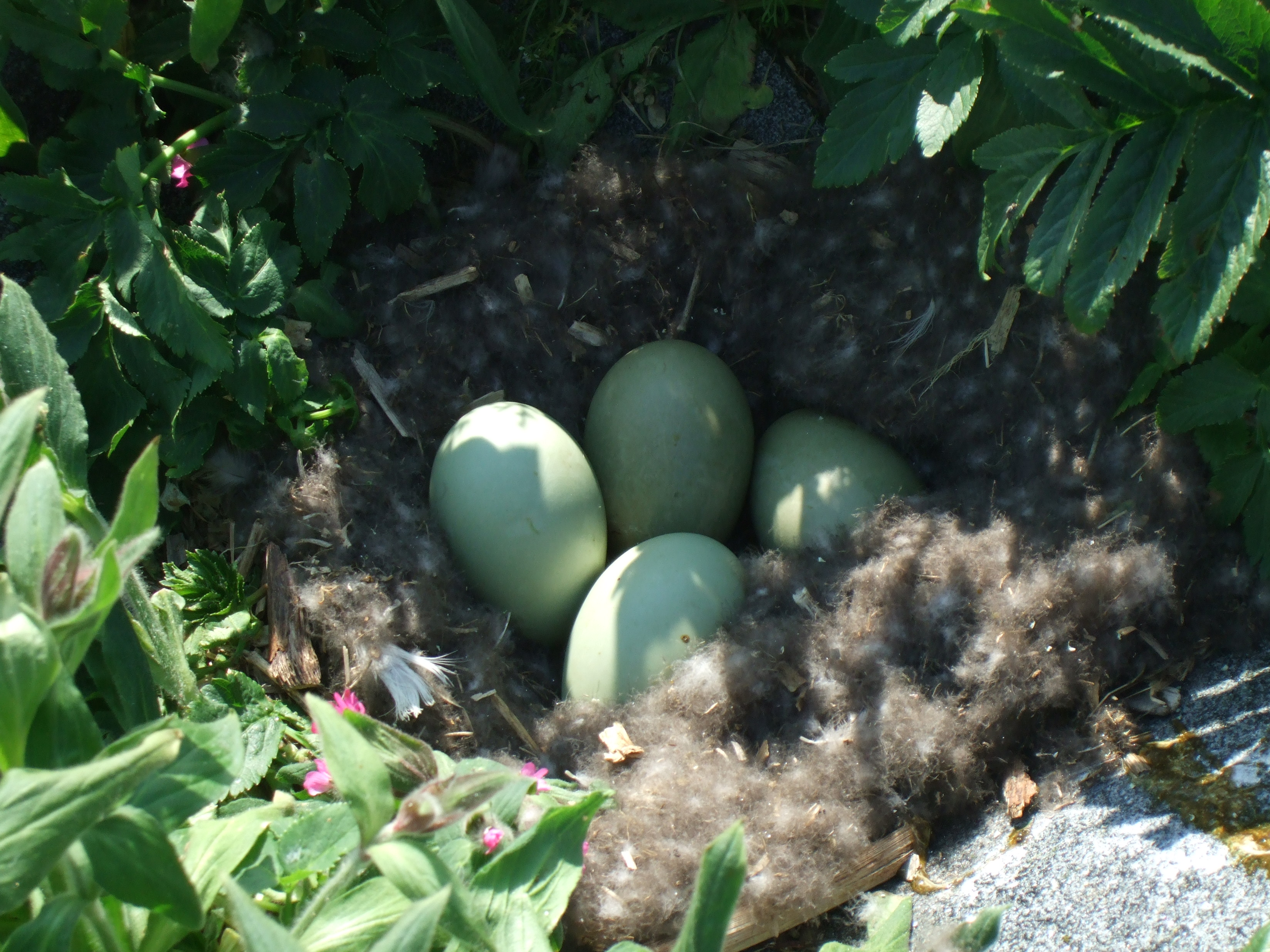
Common eider nest

The southern limit of the Norway spruce habitat in Norway is formed by a barrier of mountains and fjords, as well as winters being too mild for Norway spruce near the outer seaboard along the southwestern coast. Along the southwestern coast and fjords (Vestlandet or Western Norway) is a temperate mixed forest with pine, some yew and deciduous trees (betula pendula, wych elm, linden, oak, aspen, hazel, juniper) in the lowlands and more typical boreal forest at higher altitudes. Several species reach their northernmost extent in this ecoregion (naturally occurring): oak at Edøya and Ørland, yew at Molde, holly at Smøla, ash at Frosta, linden at Brønnøy, elm at Beiarn, hazel at Steigen, and pine has its northernmost forests in the world at Stabbursdalen National Park.

The botanically richest areas – the coast north up to Ålesund and some patches further north along Trondheimsfjord), although less diverse than the Oslofjord area due to migration barriers like fjords and mountains – are considered boreonemoral. Some of the wettest areas in this region, where annual rainfall exceed 2000 mm or even 3000 mm, are sometimes considered boreonemoral temperate rainforest.

== Introduced species ==
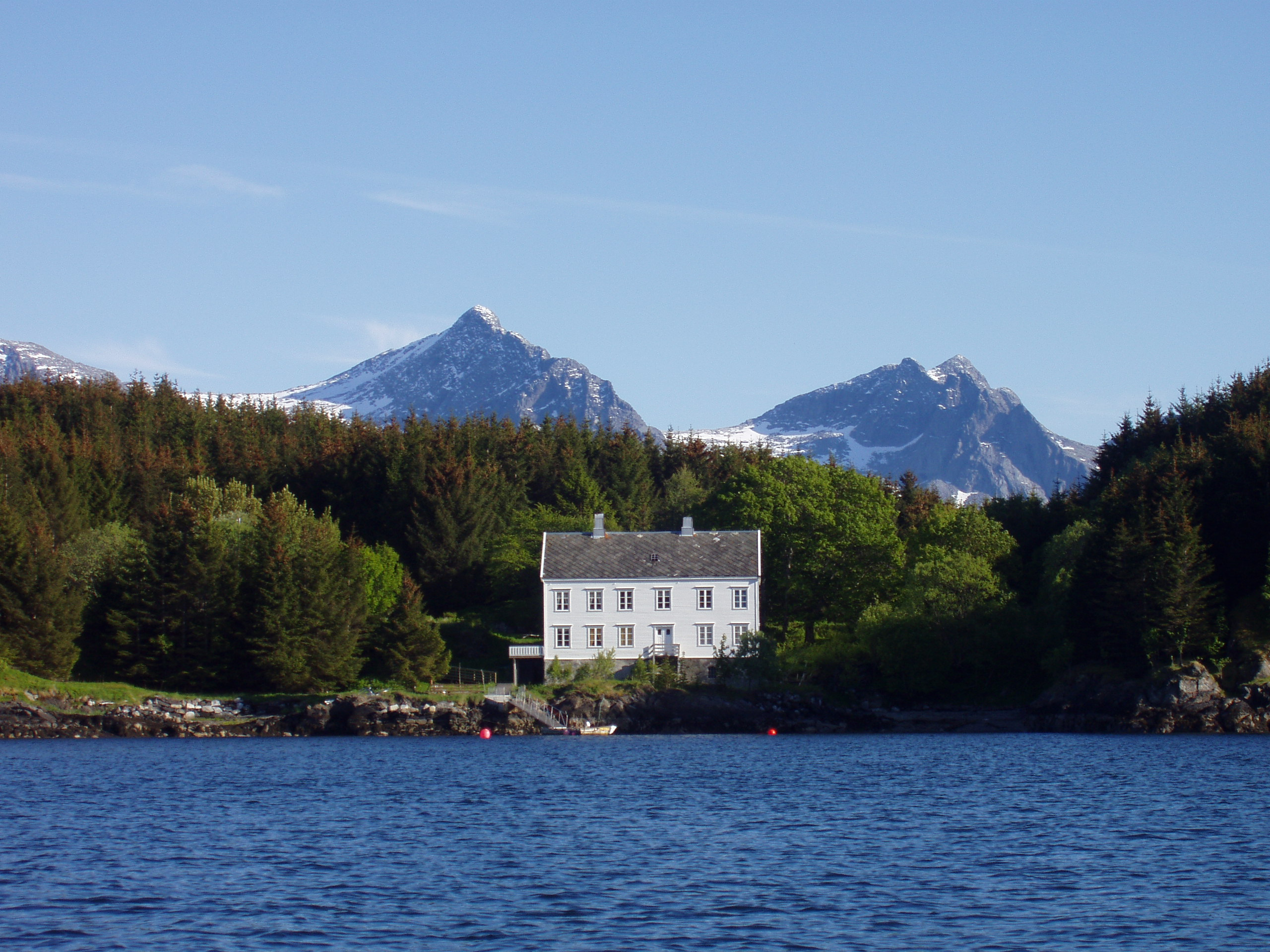
The human footprint, although weaker than further south, has transformed much of the ecoregion. Lovøygården Old trading centre and Inn surrounded by introduced Sitka spruce, Dønna.

Introduced species include the Norway spruce, which has been planted for economic reasons in areas outside the natural range both on the southwestern coast and in the northernmost part of the ecoregion. Sitka spruce has also been planted extensively, especially near the outer seaboard, even north to Vesterålen and Harstad.

Sycamore maple was introduced to private gardens and church yards more than 150 years ago, and has spread profusely along the southwestern coast, along the central coast (Trøndelag) and, to a considerably lesser degree, north to Vesterålen. It is still most common near cities and villages, but seems certain to continue expansion along the coast and fjords.

There are many smaller introduced plants spreading, such as Rosa rugosa. However, due to the often steep terrain, forestry has been somewhat limited in the coastal area, and many areas with original vegetation remain, but are often fragmented, especially so in the southern part of the ecoregion. American mink, originally escaped from fur farms, have colonized the whole country, and threaten sea bird colonies in some areas, but have not reached the outermost islands such as Røst, which have the largest sea bird colonies. The native otter seem to be dominant in areas with competition.

== Boreal rainforest ==
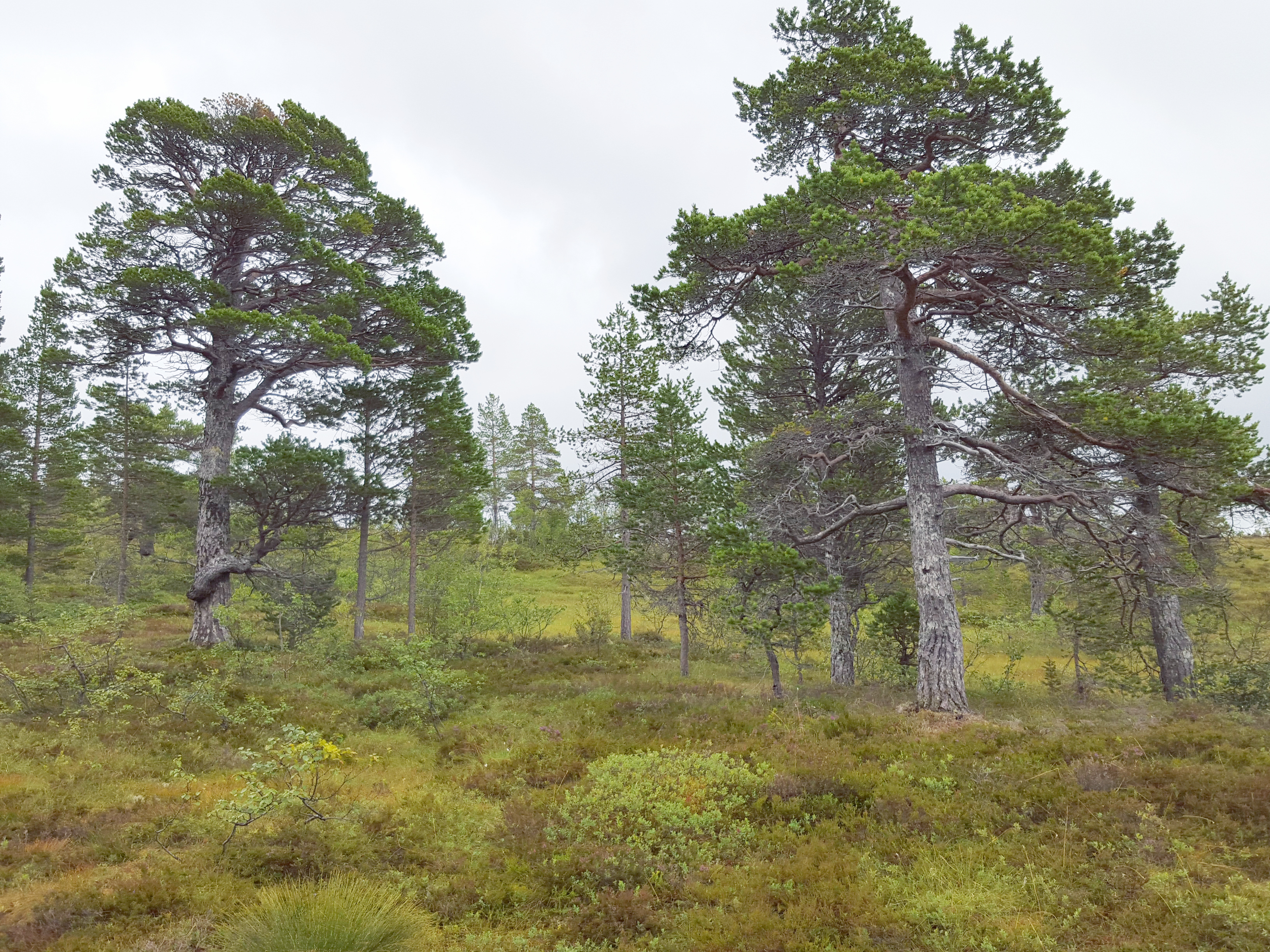
Grytdalen Nature Reserve in Orkland, among the largest nature reserves in Norway

Within this long area is a smaller area classified as boreal rainforest based on botanical criteria. Much of the original forests have been destroyed, but a total of 250 forested areas, most of them not very large, have been classified as boreal rainforest. They are located from 63°20'N in Orkland Municipality in southern Trøndelag county and north along the coast to 66°N in Rana Municipality in Nordland county, but restricted to areas with high humidity; often shielded from the sun most of the day. Some inland locations are included; these are located in moist locations, often near waterfalls. This is the main area in Europe for boreal rainforest and Norway thus has a special responsibility for preservation. This coastal forest is mostly found at the lower elevations (below 200 m).

=== Botanical criteria for boreal rainforest ===
Due to the long history of human settlement (millennia) with agriculture and more recently forestry management, only fragments remain of the original forest. The boreal rainforests are made up mostly of Norway Spruce (Picea abies) but also included deciduous trees. Common Juniper (Juniperus communis) is also common. There is a rich understory of mosses and ferns. However, the most distinguishing feature is the diversity of lichens, some of which are endemic for this forest, or have their only location in Europe here (they are often found on the northwest coast of North America). Approximately 15 of the most rare or typical species of lichens have been named Trøndelagselementet (named after the Trøndelag region). Pseudocyphella crocata, Pannaria ahlneri and Erioderma padicellatum and Lobaria halli are examples of lichens. More than 60 unique species of lichen and moss can be found in the area.

There are two subtypes of this rainforest; the Namdalen type and the Brønnøy/Fosen type. There are also broadleaf trees scattered in this forest, especially in the Brønnøy/Fosen type. Broadleaf trees include birch (Silver Birch Betula pendula and Downy Birch Betula pubescens), European Rowan (Sorbus aucuparia), Aspen (Populus tremula), Goat Willow (Salix caprea), and Grey Alder (Alnus incana). Rarer species are Wych Elm (Ulmus glabra), Common Hazel (Corylus avellana) and Black Alder (Alnus glutinosa) (the latter only in the southern part of the area).

== Fauna ==
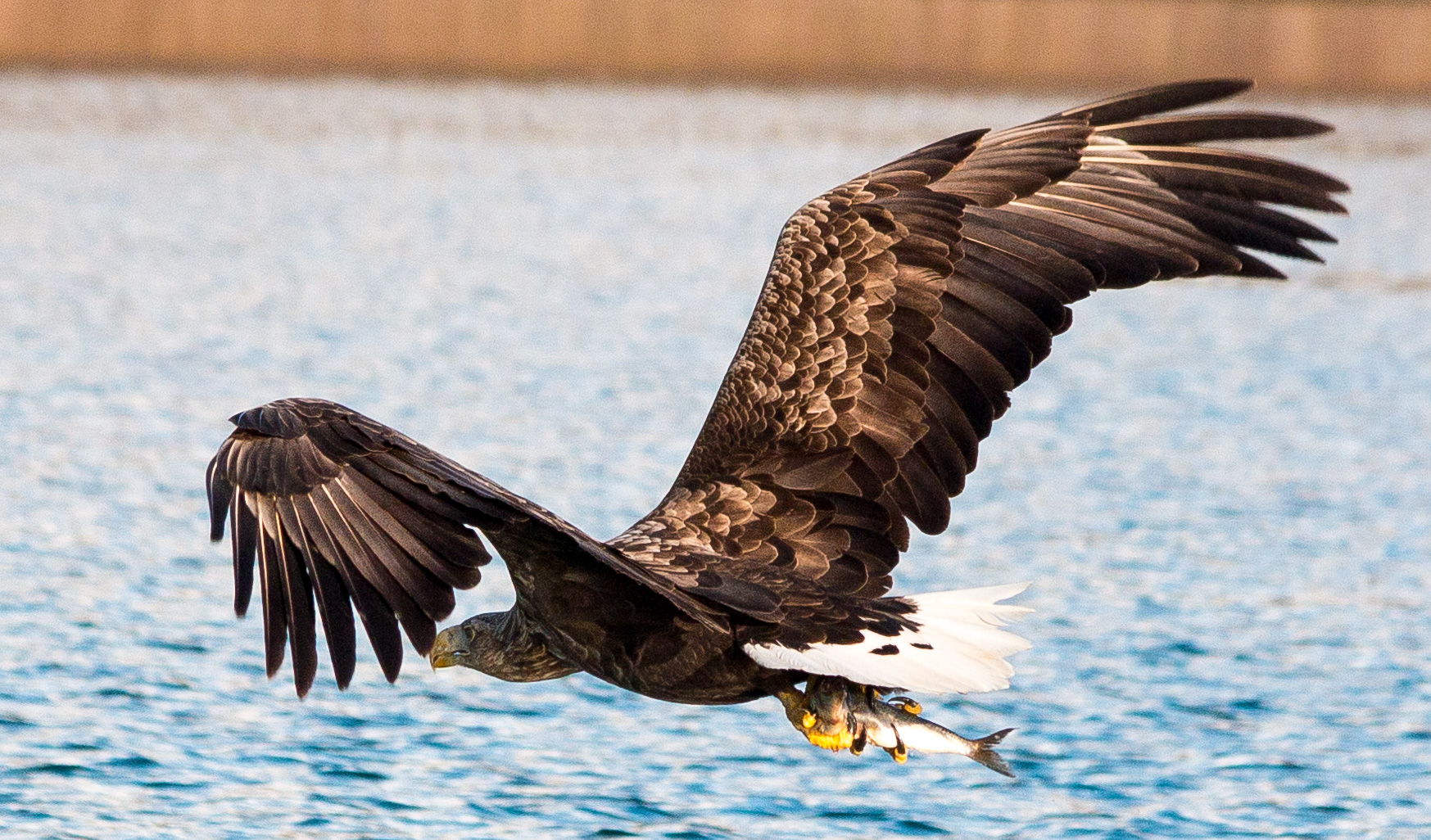
The Norwegian coast has Europe's largest white-tailed eagle population

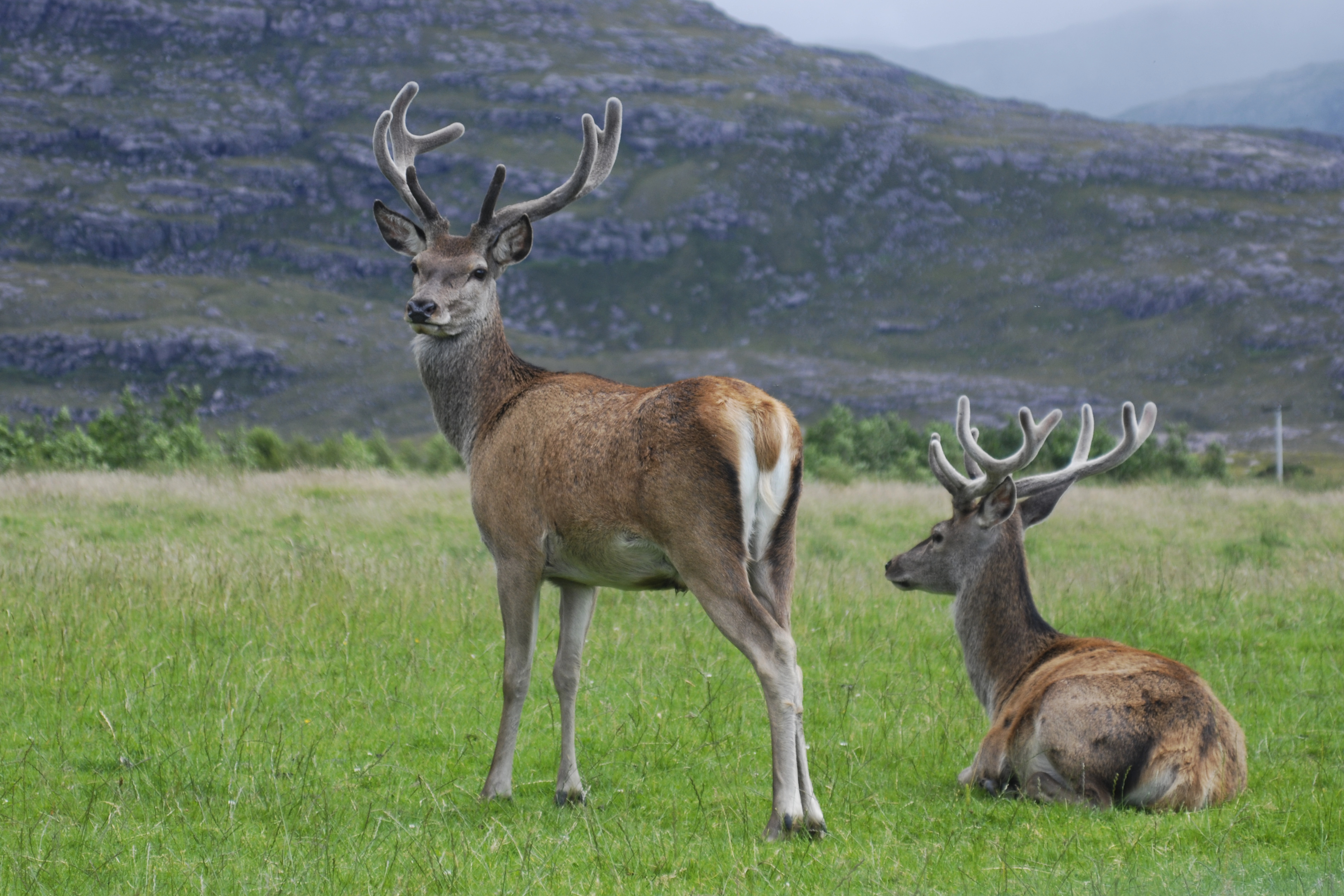
In the last decades, the red deer has migrated further north along the coast and also further inland.

There are a large number of species of migrating birds in this ecoregion, as well as some that stay all year. Larger herbivore animals are moose and red deer (the latter only south of the Arctic Circle), as well as the smaller roe deer. Mountain reindeer might occasionally come down to the coast north of Trondheimsfjord, but they usually stay at the highlands outside this ecoregion. Predators are few, as they have been hunted by man for centuries, exterminating Eurasian brown bear and Eurasian wolf in the coastal area. In some areas, they roam further inland in the taiga ecoregion, and might on rare occasions get closer to the coast. Red fox and the white-tailed eagle are common predators in the area, the latter now being very common after decades of protection. There are also some northern lynx, mostly in the northern part. Hares, Eurasian otters are common and one can even see Eurasian beavers although more rarely. There are also some amphibians including the common frog and the smooth newt; the european viper can be seen south of the Arctic circle.

== See also ==
- List of ecoregions in Europe
- Scandinavian montane birch forest and grasslands
- Scandinavian and Russian taiga
- Sarmatic mixed forests
- Vegetation of Norway
- Temperate coniferous forests

== Gallery ==
=== Photographs ===
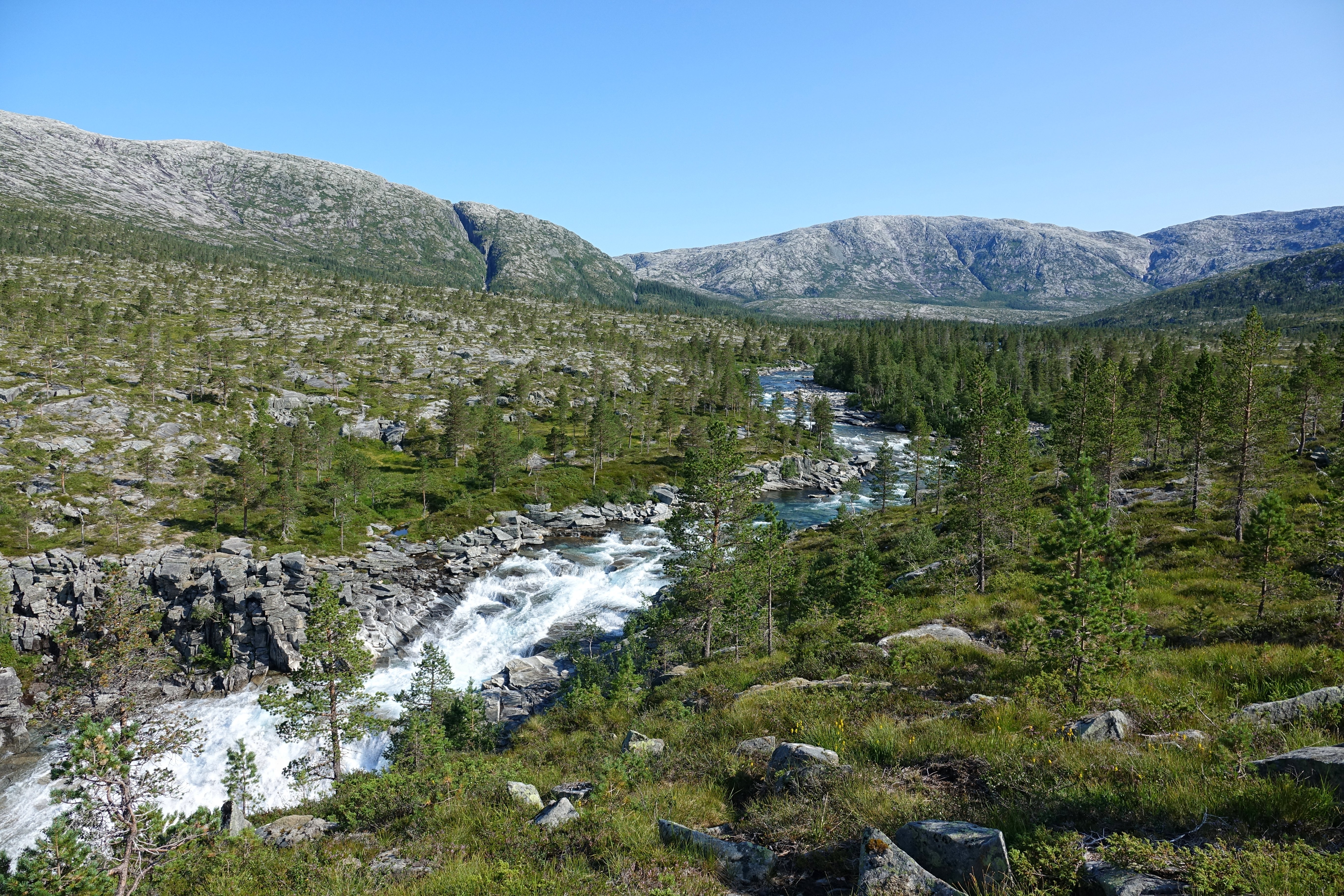
Lomsdalen in Lomsdal-Visten National Park in Brønnøy Municipality

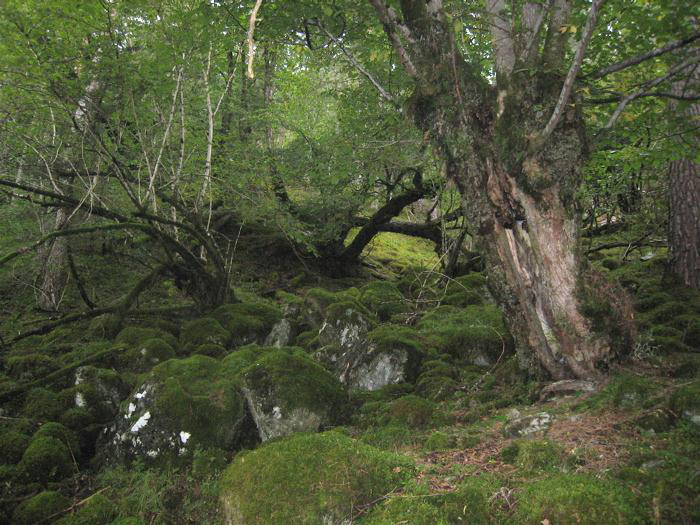
Oceanic forest in Kinn Municipality, Vestland

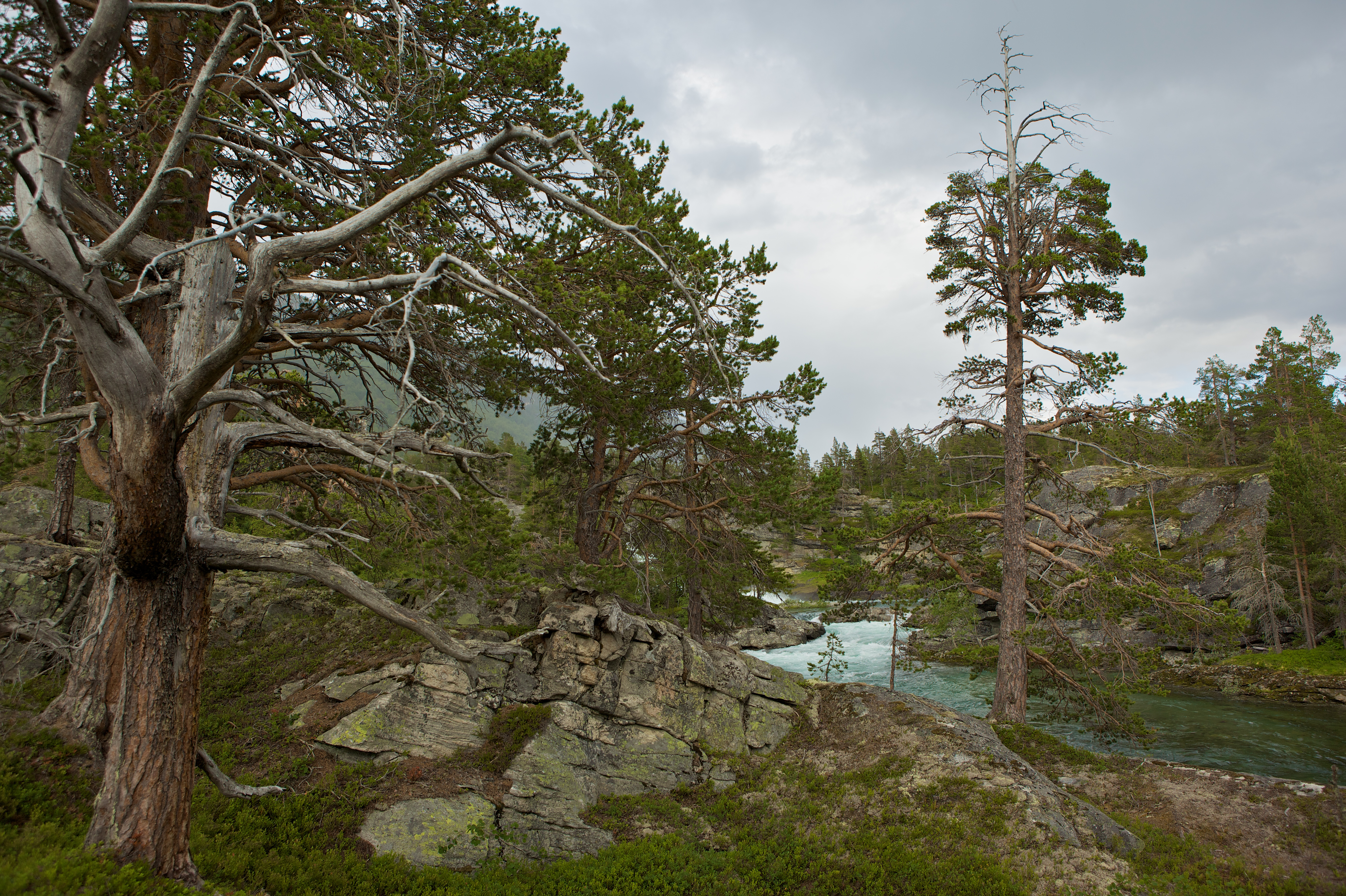
Old Pines in Romsdalen

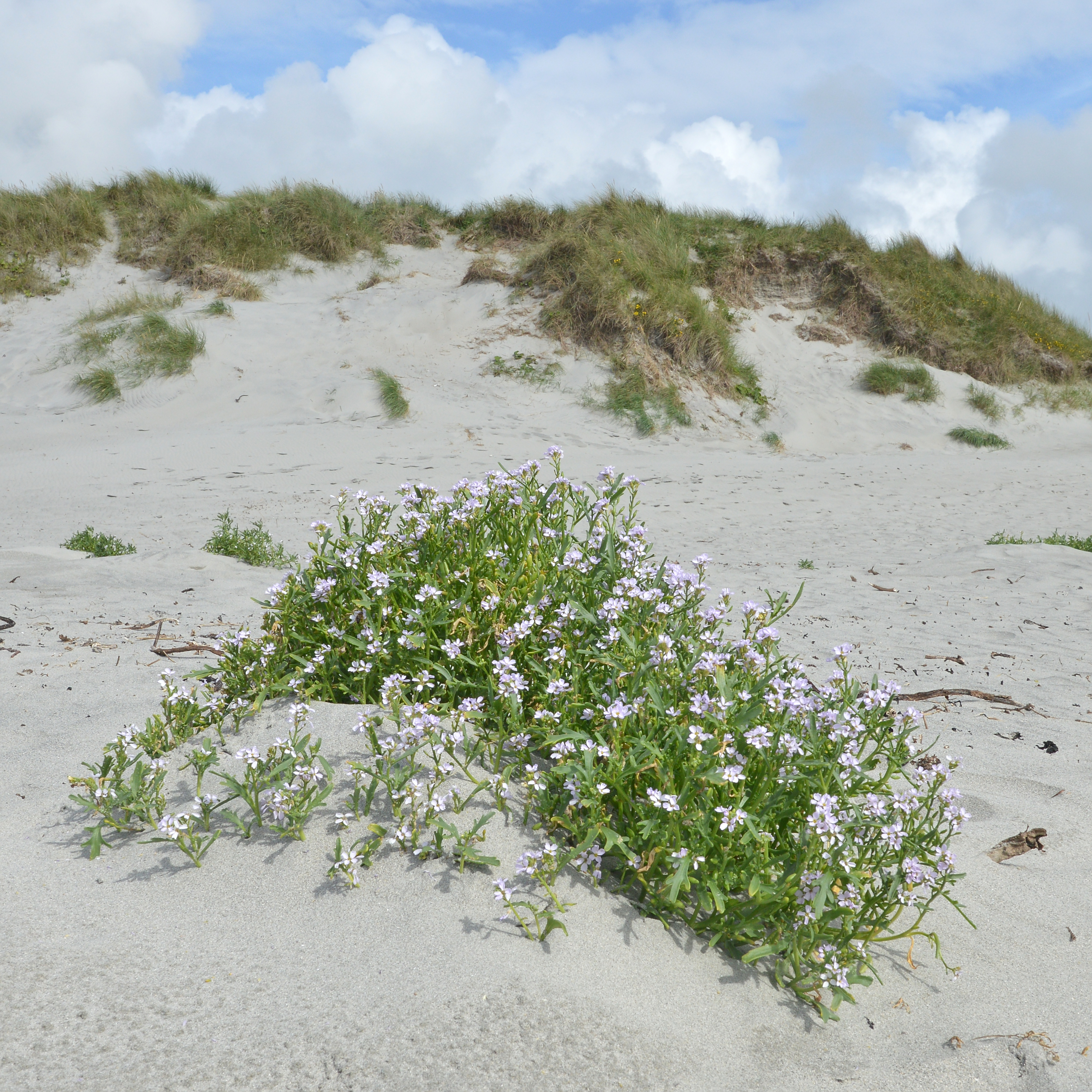
Sea Rocket and sand dunes in Hå Municipality

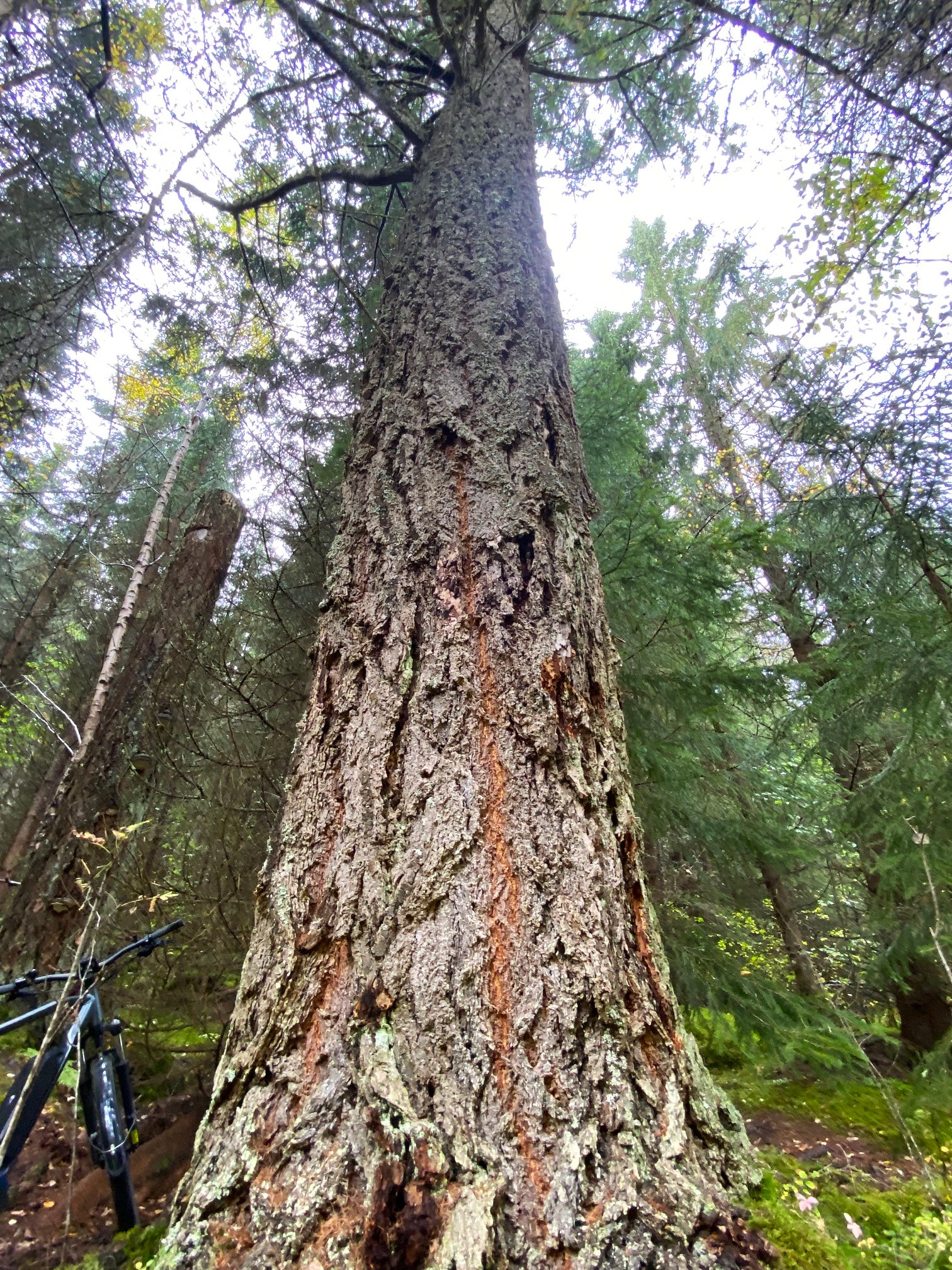
Introduced coast Douglas-fir in Trondheim Municipality.

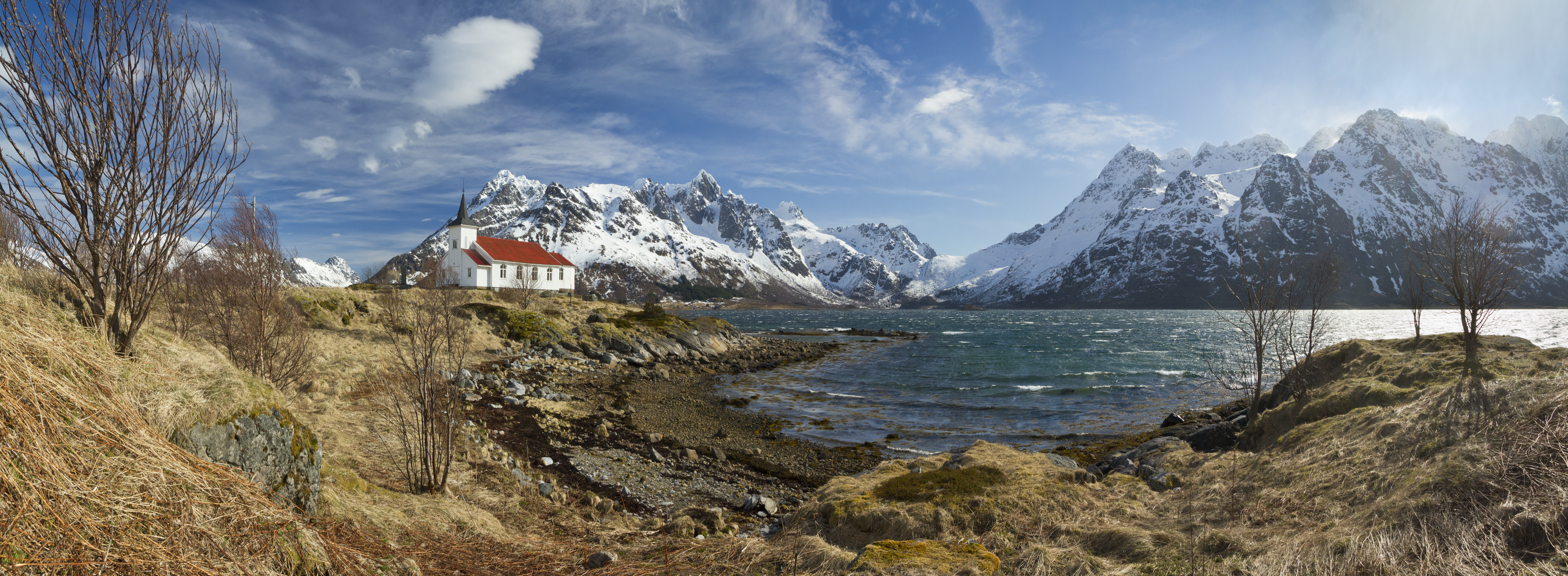
April view near Sildpollnes, Austvågøya, Vågan Municipality

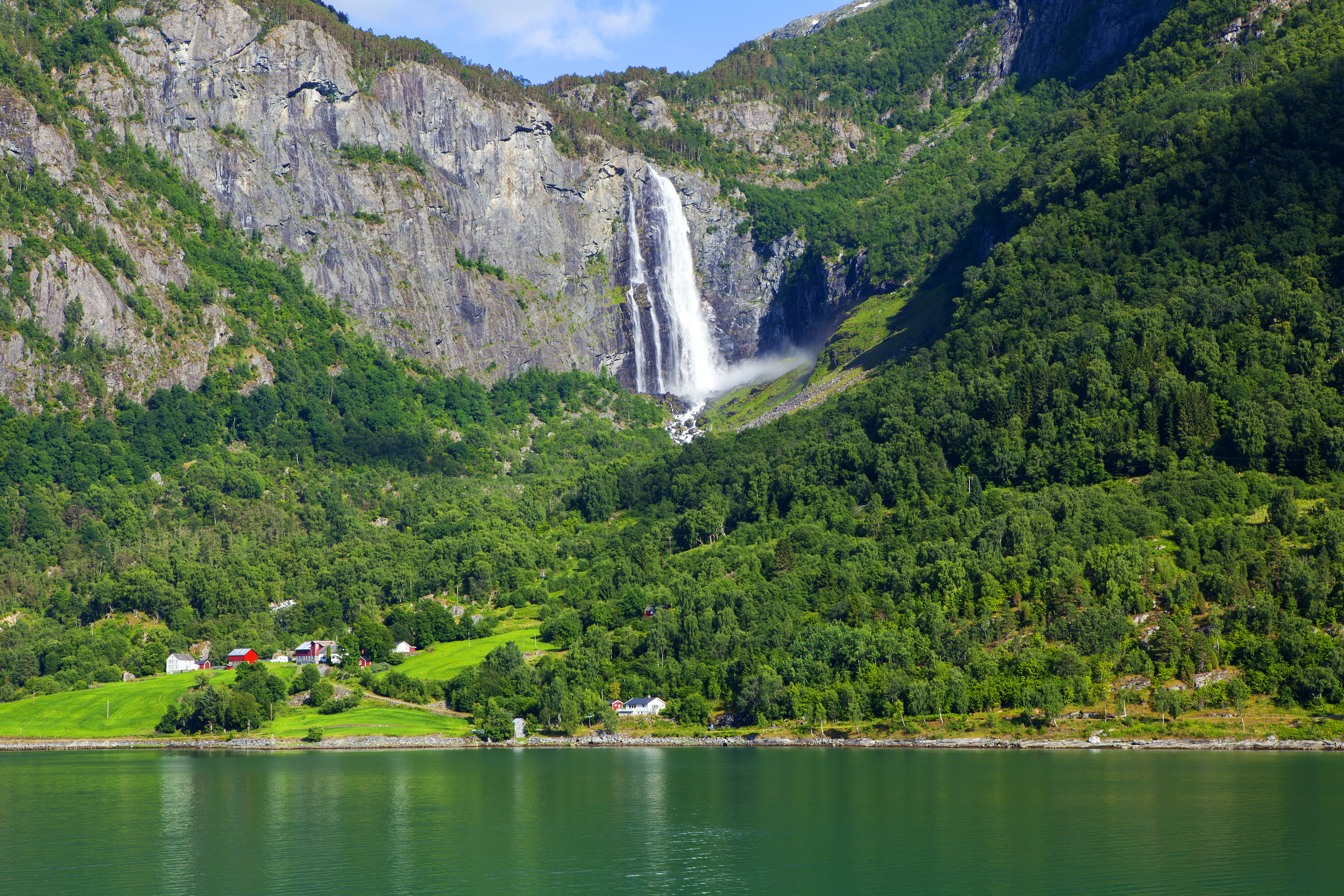
Waterfall in the mixed forest near Sognefjord in Luster Municipality

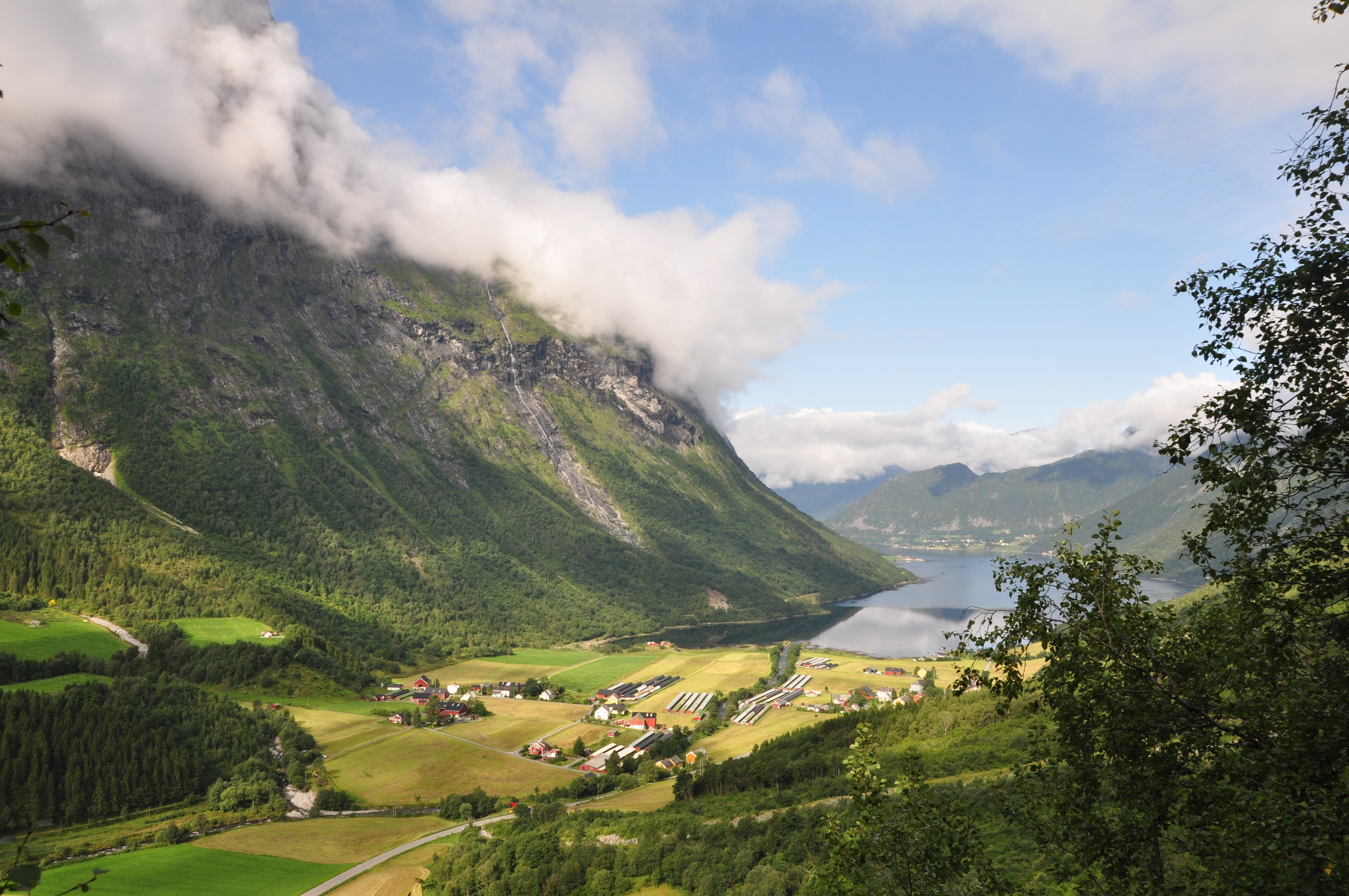
Norangsdalen valley, Ørsta Municipality

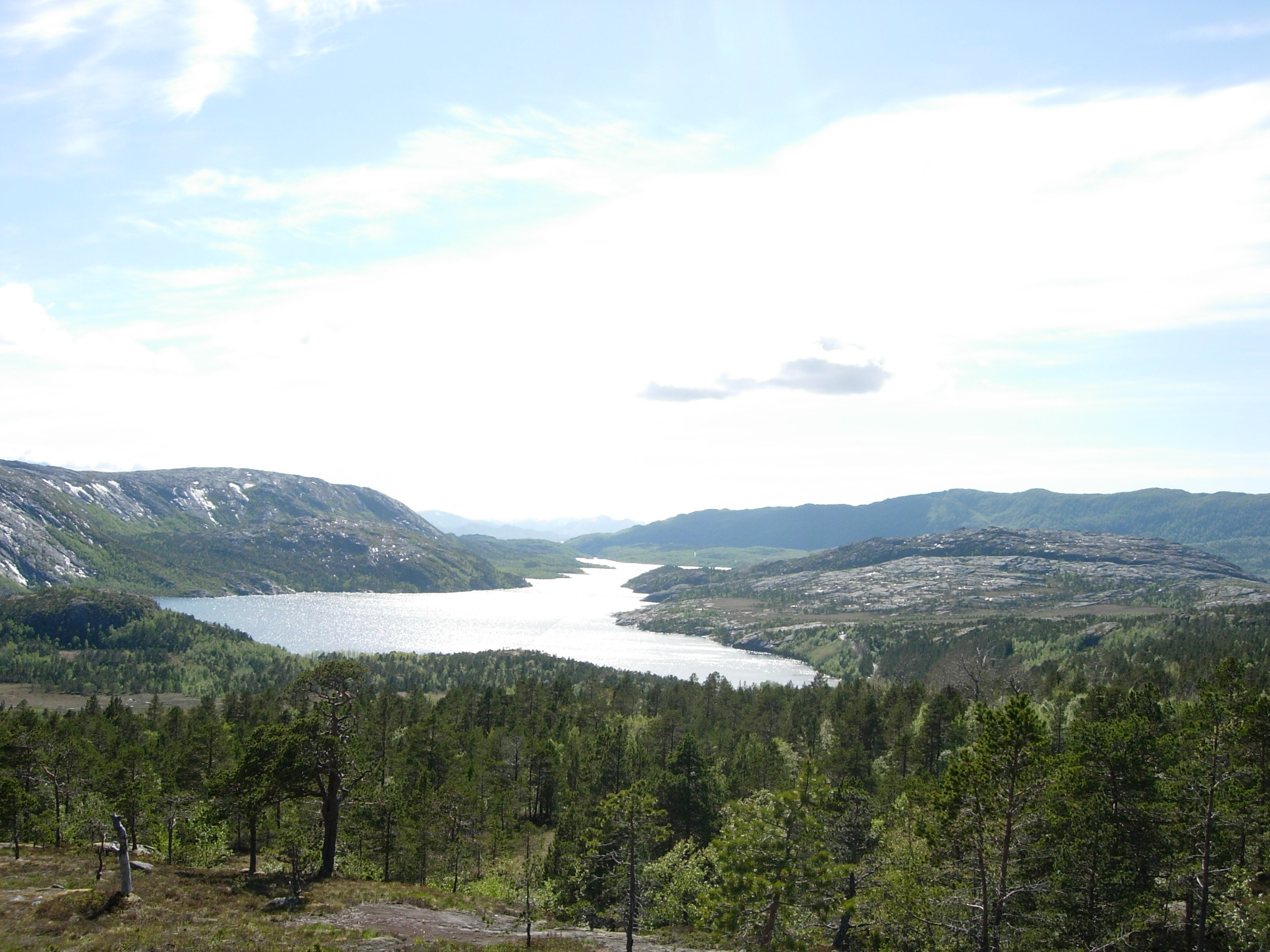
Coniferous forest near Vatnvatet lake, Bodø Municipality
