= Scandinavian montane birch forest and grasslands =

Tundra ecoregion in Scandinavia

Coordinates: 69°03′36″N 20°32′52″E

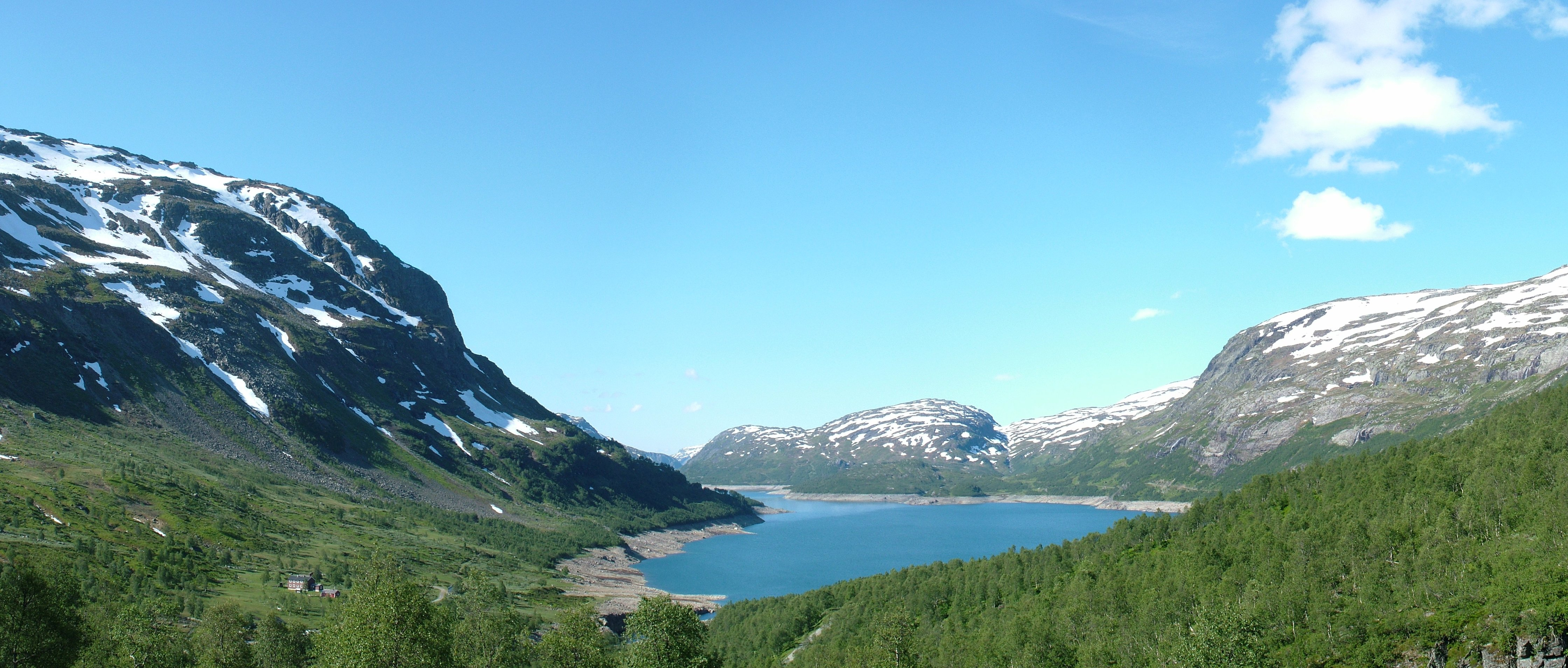
- Lake and mountain birch forest in Hardangervidda National Park

- Map of the ecoregion

Ecology
- Realm: Palearctic
- Biome: tundra
- Borders: Kola Peninsula tundra; Scandinavian coastal conifer forests, Scandinavian and Russian taiga

Geography
- Area: 236,788 km^{2} (91,424 mi^{2})
- Countries: Finland; Norway; Sweden

Conservation
- Conservation status: Vulnerable
- Protected: 74,210 km² (31%)

The Scandinavian montane birch forests and grasslands is defined by the World Wildlife Fund (WWF) as a terrestrial tundra ecoregion in Norway, Sweden, and Finland.

== Conservation value ==
The Scandinavian montane birch forests and grasslands is one of the Global 200 ecoregions as defined by WWF, and is thus regarded as a high priority for conservation.

== Geography ==
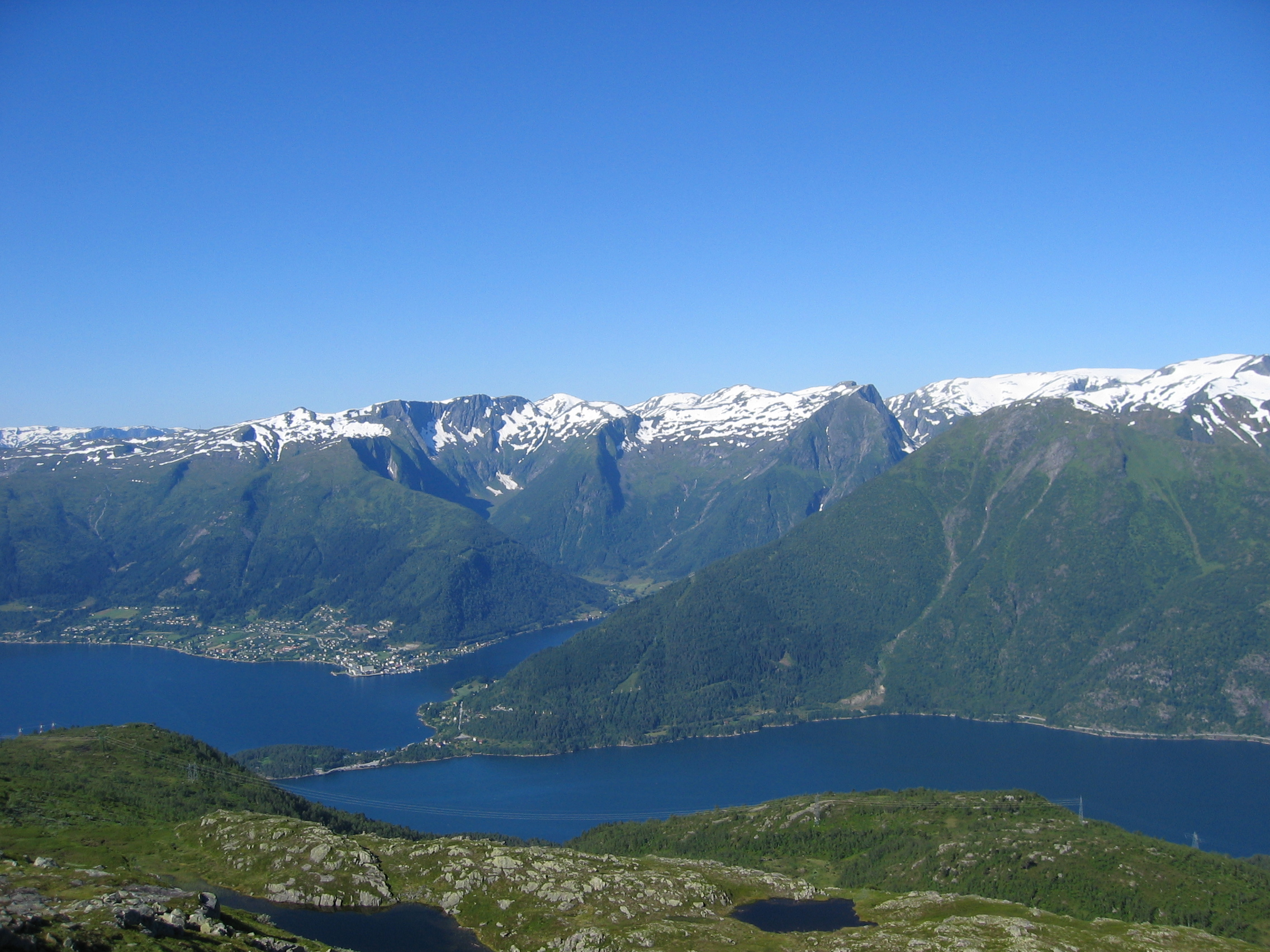
Balestrand near the Sognefjord has a temperate climate (all months above 0 °C (32 °F). Mountains nearby reach 1,400 m /4,600 ft with alpine tundra, glaciers and mean annual down to −2 °C (28 °F).

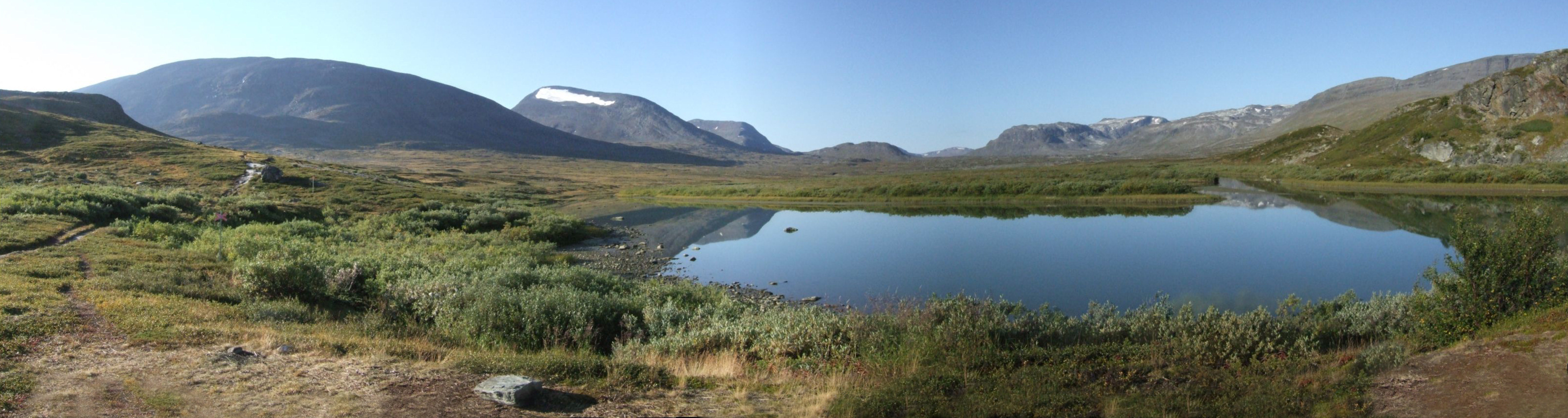
Alpine tundra near Alesjaure, northern Sweden

The ecoregion follows the Scandinavian Mountains, and spans 11 degrees of latitude from the south to the north. About two-thirds of the ecoregion is located in Norway, about one-third in Sweden and a small area touches the northwesternmost part of Finland. The WWF definition of the ecoregion spans an area 1,600 km long, with a total area of approximately 243 000 km^{2}. Despite being classified as a tundra ecoregion, the large area outlined by WWF has a huge range in climates and biomes, including many areas with both boreal and even temperate oceanic climate. Examples of temperate areas are the lowland along the fjords such as Hardangerfjord (including Ullensvang, Sognefjord (including Sogndal, Romsdalsfjord (including Molde and also some coastal areas along the mainland further north, such as Brønnøy.

The Scandinavian mountains includes the largest glaciers on the European mainland (Jostedalsbreen, Svartisen), Northern Europe's highest mountains (Jotunheimen) and largest mountain plateau. The mountain chain itself creates a rain shadow, and the eastern part of the mountain chain receive less precipitation than the western part. The ecoregion is divided in two parts, the southern part is in Norway's central mountains. The northern part follows the northern part of the Scandinavian mountains Kjølen, and reaches to the coast in the far north. To the west is WWFs ecoregion Scandinavian coastal conifer forests and to the east is Scandinavian and Russian taiga. In the far south is the Sarmatic mixed forest.

== Settlements and threats ==
There are few towns in the true montane birch forest zone and alpine zone in Norway and Sweden. On the northernmost coast, the towns Hammerfest and Vadsø are situated in the montane birch zone. In southern Norway, Røros, Geilo and Hovden are situated in, or partly in, the montane birch zone. In contrast to the lowlands, there are many national parks protecting this zone. The largest threat in Norway are the many private cabins, where people also want road access, electrical power and internet. Warming climate will result in climate zones, and eventually vegetation zones (depending on several factors besides temperature, like the different plants spreading ability, grazing animals etc) will migrate up the mountain slopes to higher elevations. As the forest moves upwards, this montane and alpine ecoregion will shrink in size, especially the coldest alpine zones. The Hardangervidda plateau is expected to be largely covered by forest and forest will climb higher in all areas, like the Dovre mountains. The treeline in Norway is currently moving upwards on average by 0.5 - 1 m altitude each year, with more in some areas. The highest altitude tree in Norway in 2019 was a mountain birch growing at 1,404 m ASL in Jotunheimen. The 1991-2020 temperature normal is significantly warmer than the 1961-1990 normal for all of Scandinavia.

== Weather data ==
Monthly 24-hr mean temperatures at Fokstugu mountain lodge, Dovrefjell mountains in Central Norway 1961-1990 and 1991-2020:

Climate data for Fokstugu 1961-1990 (973 m / 3192 ft ASL)
Month	Jan	Feb	Mar	Apr	May	Jun	Jul	Aug	Sep	Oct	Nov	Dec	Year
Daily mean °C (°F)	−8.8 (16.2)	−8.2 (17.2)	−6 (21)	−2.4 (27.7)	4 (39)	8.5 (47.3)	9.8 (49.6)	9 (48)	4.6 (40.3)	0.9 (33.6)	−4.7 (23.5)	−7.3 (18.9)	0.0 (31.9)
Source: seklima.met.no

Climate data for Fokstugu 1991-2020 (973 m / 3192 ft ASL)
Month	Jan	Feb	Mar	Apr	May	Jun	Jul	Aug	Sep	Oct	Nov	Dec	Year
Mean daily maximum °C (°F)	−3.9 (25.0)	−3.9 (25.0)	−1.3 (29.7)	3.2 (37.8)	8.5 (47.3)	13.1 (55.6)	16 (61)	14.5 (58.1)	10 (50)	3.8 (38.8)	−1.1 (30.0)	−3.4 (25.9)	4.6 (40.4)
Daily mean °C (°F)	−6.5 (20.3)	−6.8 (19.8)	−4.8 (23.4)	−0.6 (30.9)	4.1 (39.4)	8.3 (46.9)	11.1 (52.0)	9.9 (49.8)	6 (43)	0.6 (33.1)	−3.8 (25.2)	−6 (21)	1.0 (33.7)
Mean daily minimum °C (°F)	−10.1 (13.8)	−10.3 (13.5)	−8.5 (16.7)	−4.4 (24.1)	−0.3 (31.5)	3.6 (38.5)	6.5 (43.7)	5.9 (42.6)	2.5 (36.5)	−2.6 (27.3)	−7 (19)	−9.6 (14.7)	−2.9 (26.8)
Source 1: seklima.met.no
Source 2: NOAA / WMO averages 91-2020 Norway

== Habitats ==
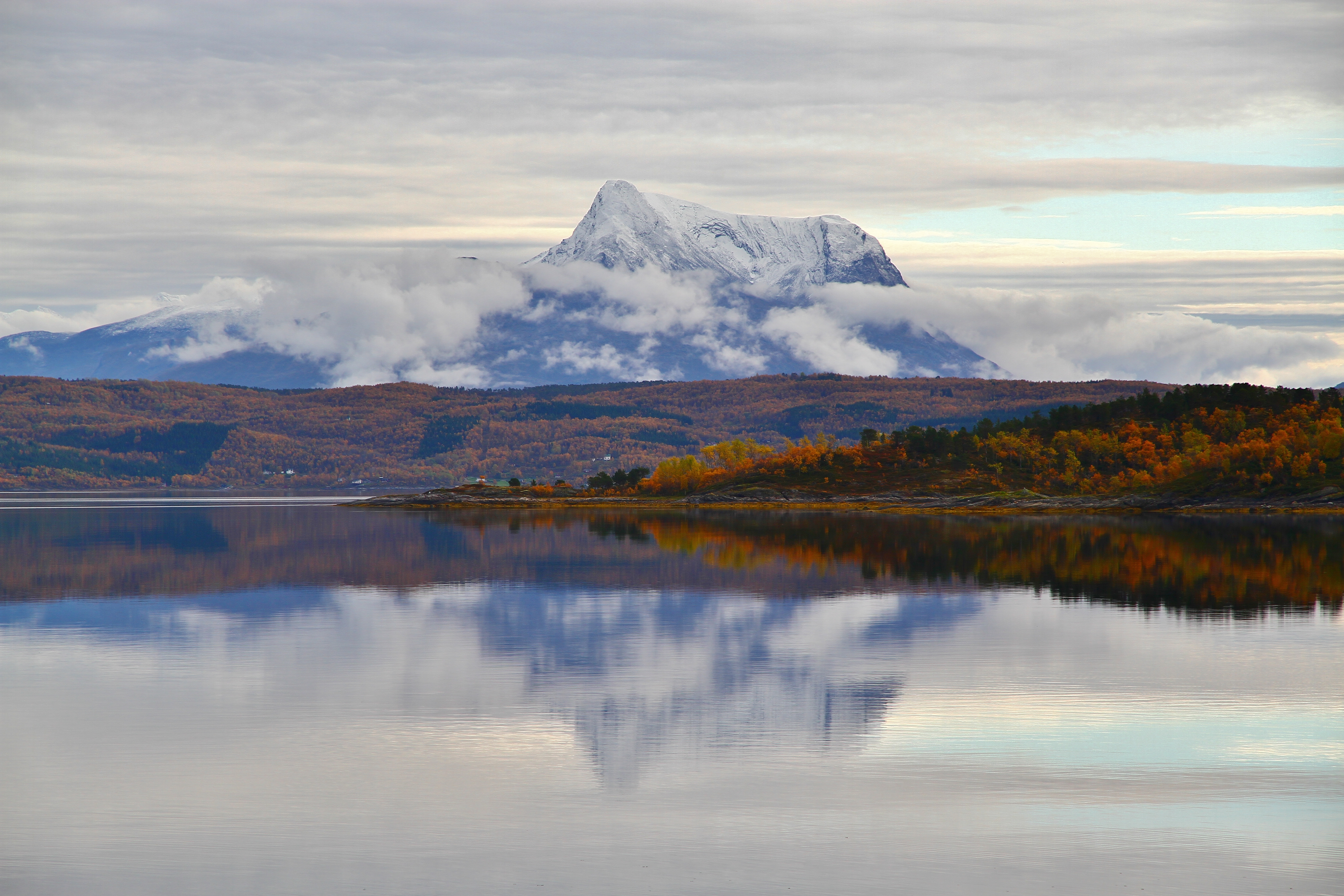
There is a large span in environmental conditions from the fjords to the mountains. Fall colors in the mid-boreal forest near the fjord while the mountains in Narvik Municipality reach up to high alpine tundra; Northern Norway.

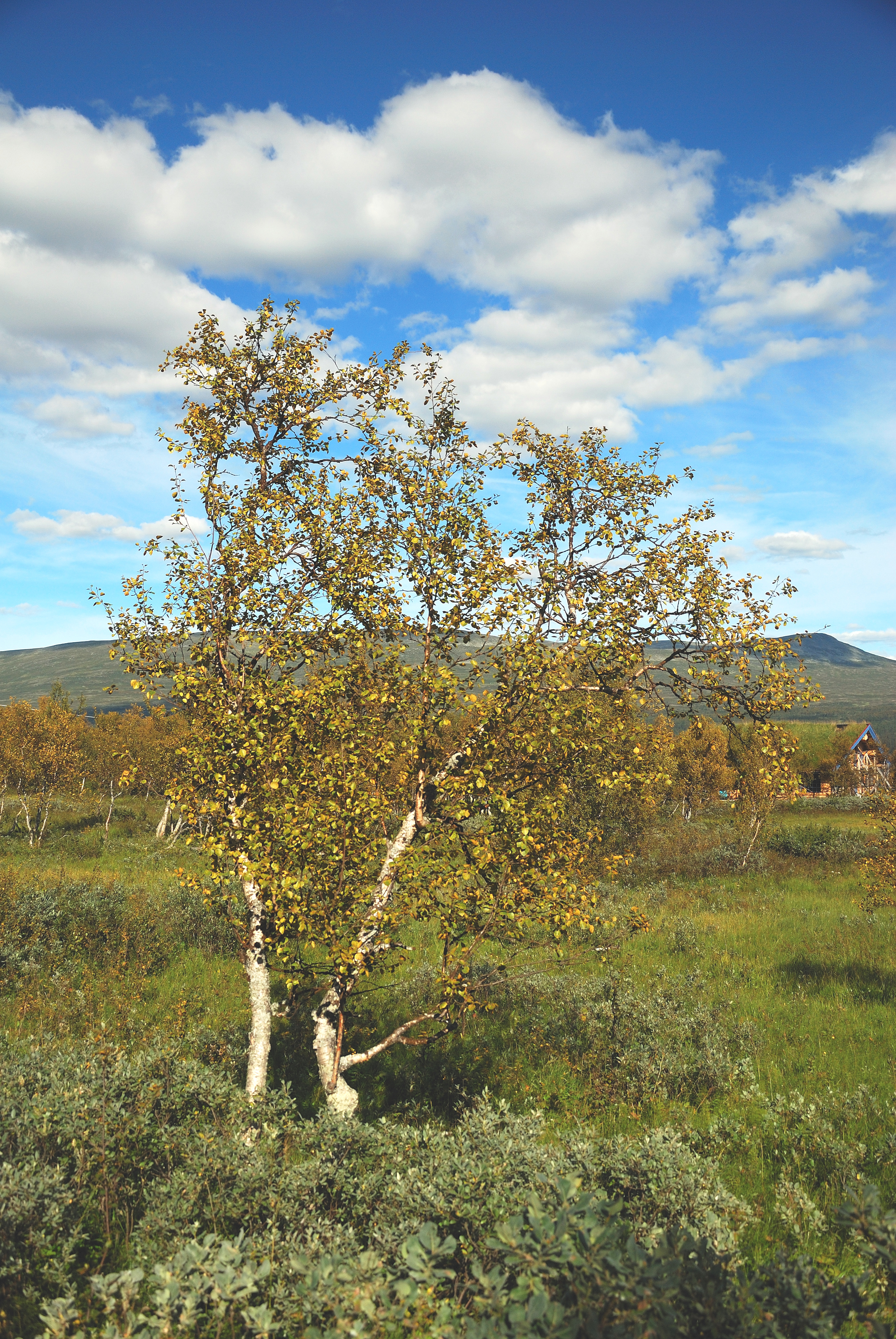
Mountain birch near the treeline in Ljungdalen, Sweden

Parts of the ecoregion are located in smaller mountain areas surrounded by lower elevation biomes, as is the case with coastal mountains in Norway. At the highest altitude is high alpine tundra with very modest vegetation and bare rock, scree, snowfields and glaciers. At lower altitude is low alpine tundra with continuous plant cover; dwarf birch and willows up to 1 m tall and grasslands, as well as numerous lakes and bogs. At still lower altitude is the adjacent montane birch zone with mountain downy birch (Betula pubescens); some stunted spruce and pine, and many lakes and bogs. This part is regarded as part of the north boreal (sparse taiga) vegetation zone; birch forming the treeline is very rare outside Scandinavia. At lower elevations the forests become closed-canopy, denser and taller with more species including mature Scots pine and aspen forming boreal forests. The map of this ecoregion used by WWF thus has a very large span in environmental conditions; from temperate forests to the highest mountains with glaciers and snowfields. The steep terrain with mountains along fjords and coast demands high resolution.

== Flora ==
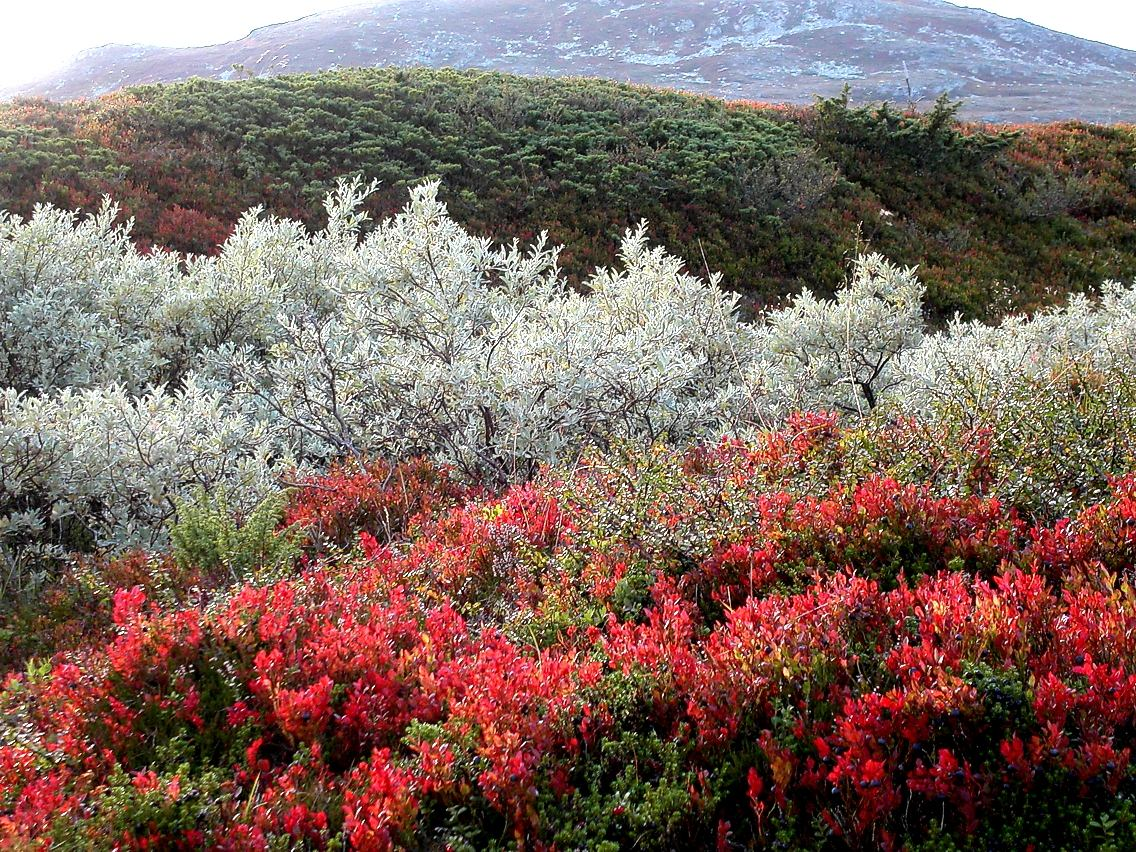
Some typical plants on the low alpine tundra in autumn

There are many alpine plant species in this region not found anywhere else in Europe, but often in the Arctic and sometimes in mountain areas in North America. In addition to birch, the trees in this region include aspen, Scots pine, Juniperus communis, grey alder, rowan, goat willow and bird cherry. Some of the characteristic herbs are Aconitum lycoctonum, bilberry (blueberry) and Rubus chamaemorus, the latter typically growing on the numerous bogs.

== Fauna ==
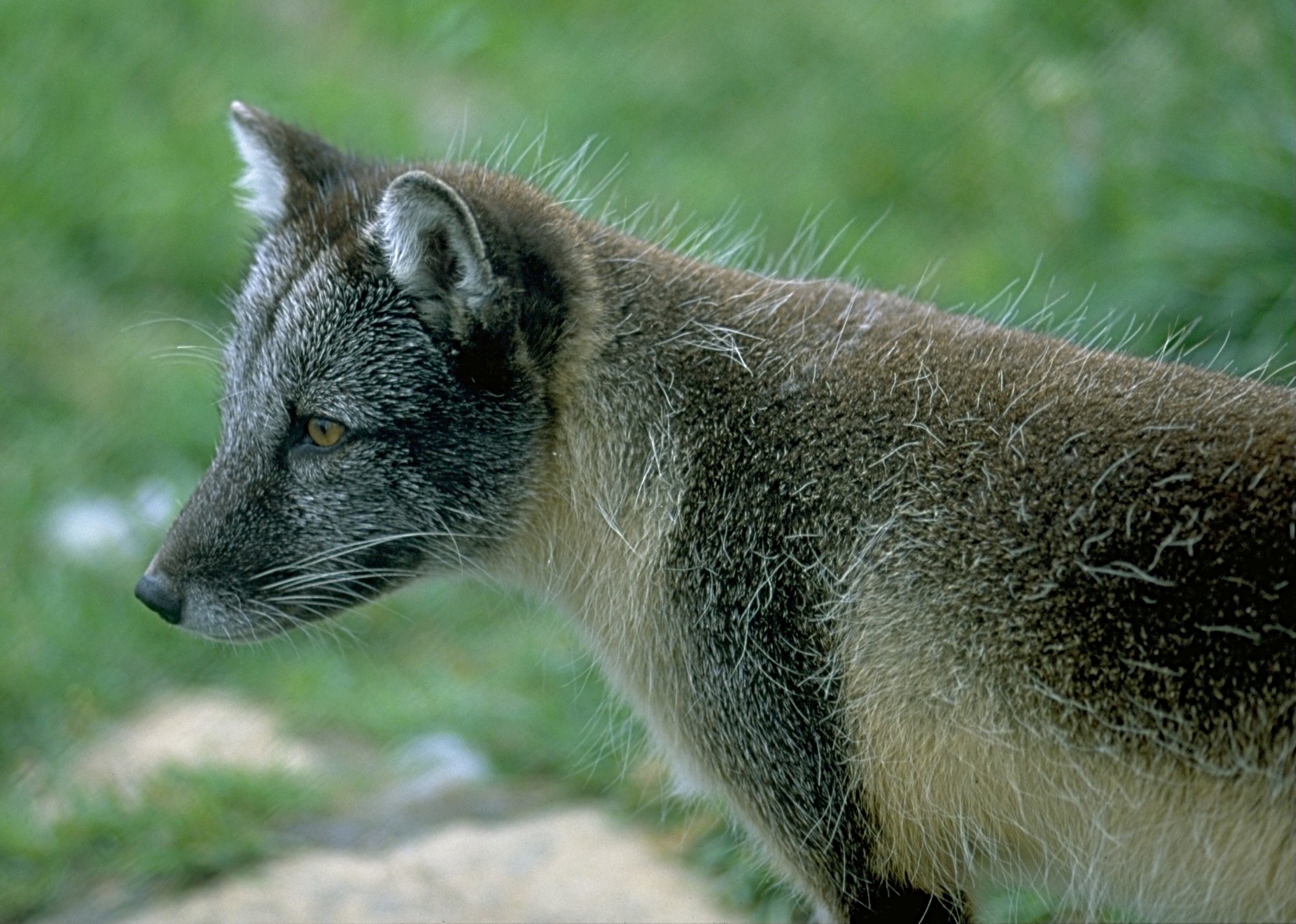
The Arctic fox is the most threatened mammal in the ecoregion.

The ecoregion's fauna includes predators like wolverine, Eurasian brown bear, northern lynx, Eurasian wolf, red fox and stoat. The Arctic fox is in danger of extinction in this area, but there are efforts to try to save the species. Herbivores include wild mountain reindeer (only in the mountains in central Norway; the reindeer in the north are semi-domesticated), roe deer and red deer (lowland in southern part of ecoregion); the most common large herbivore is the moose (mostly below the treeline). Lemming, voles, red squirrel and mountain hare are common, and the Eurasian otter is common near the fjords and in many rivers, especially in the north. There are approximately 150 muskoxen on Dovrefjell, having been transported from Greenland in the 1930s, as the species were extinct in Scandinavia. There is a rich bird life; most birds are migratory, but some, like the ptarmigan, stay all year. Bird species include gyrfalcon and sea eagles. There are many lakes with trout and Arctic char, the rivers have sea trout and salmon.

== See also ==
- Boreal forest
- Subalpine zone
- Alpine tundra
- Altitudinal zonation
- Scandinavian coastal conifer forests
- Scandinavian and Russian taiga
- Sarmatic mixed forests
- Geography of Norway

== Gallery ==
Photographs - mountain areas and north boreal/mountain forest

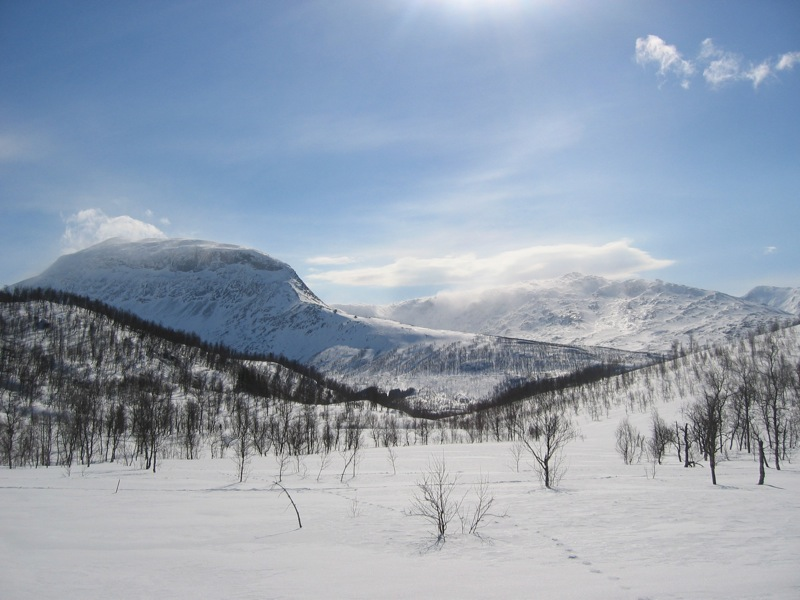
Deep snow at the treeline, Junkerdal National Park

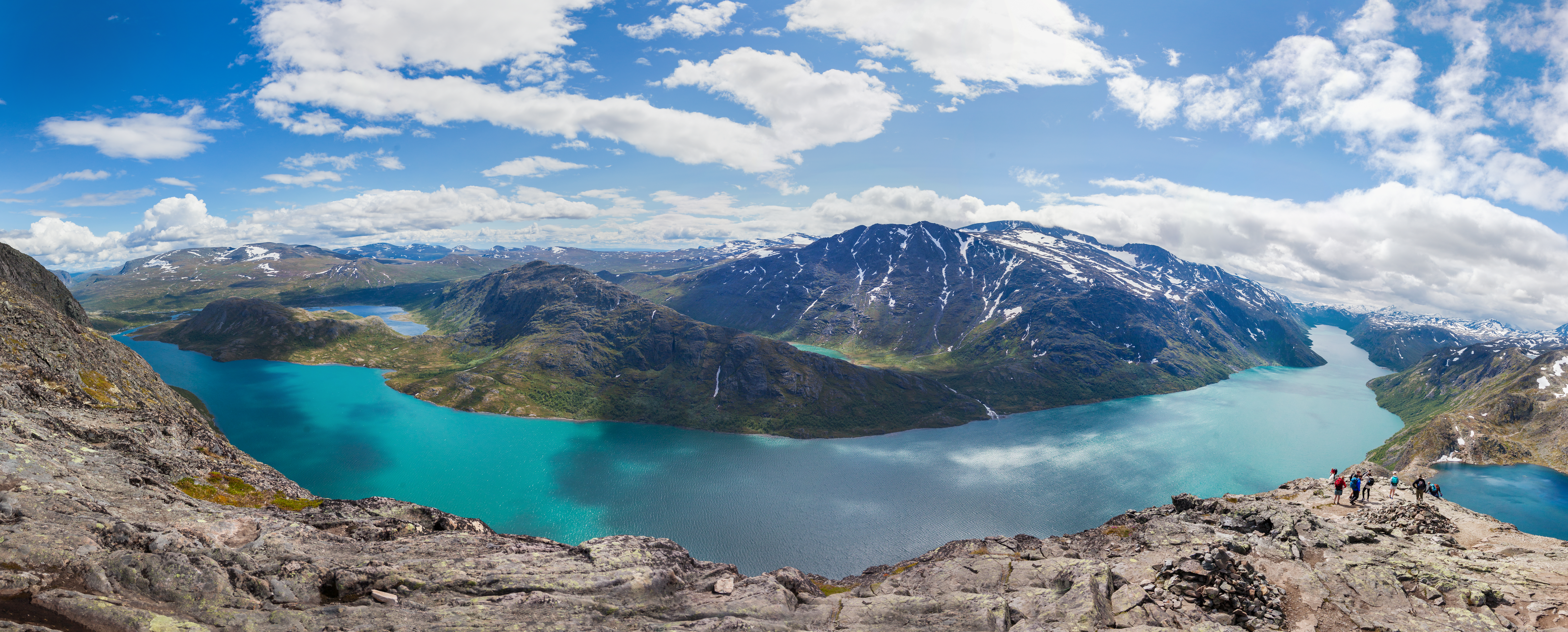
Besseggen in Jotunheimen National Park, with the highest mountains in Northern Europe

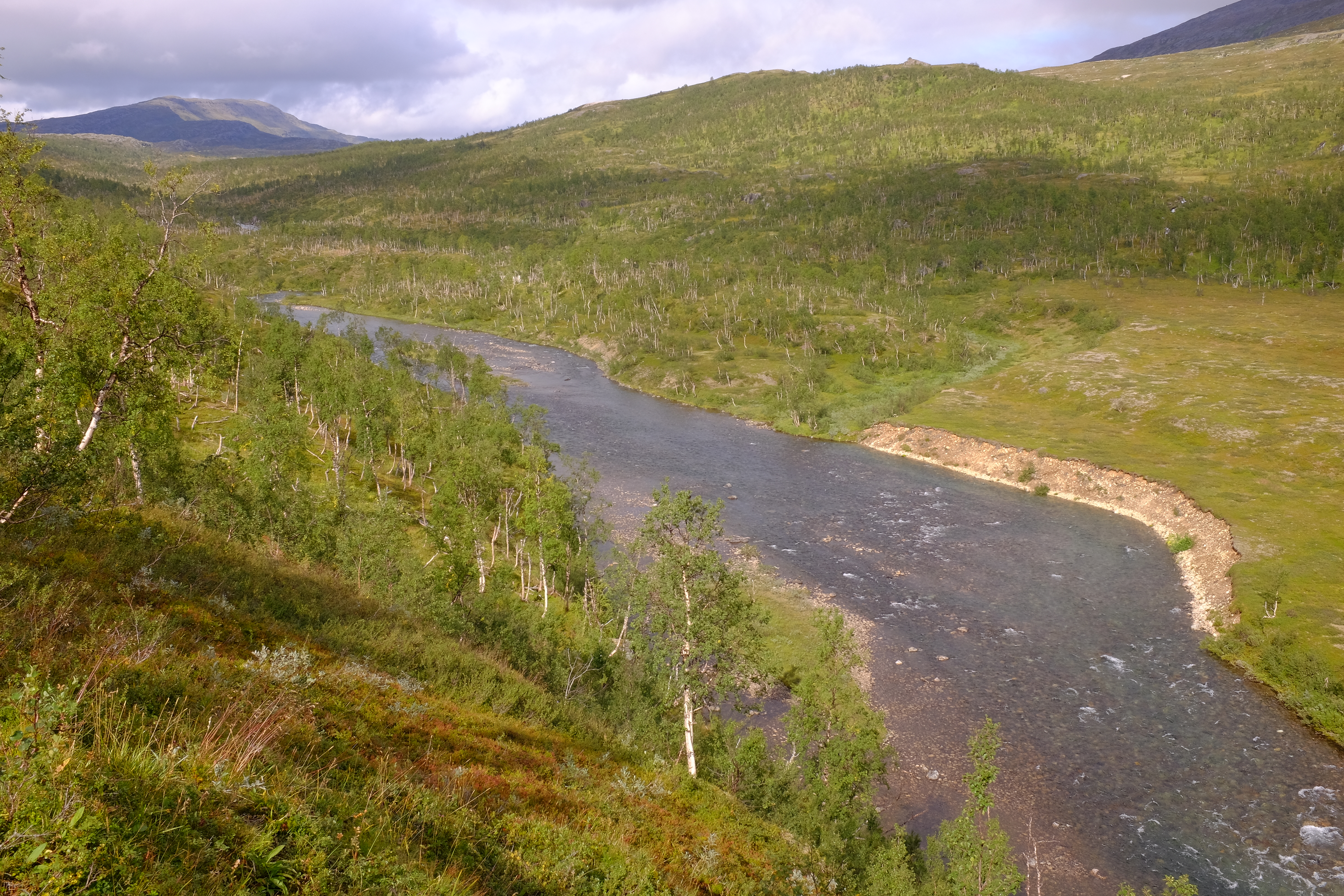
Bjøllåga river and mountain birch in Bjøllå valley, Saltfjellet-Svartisen National Park

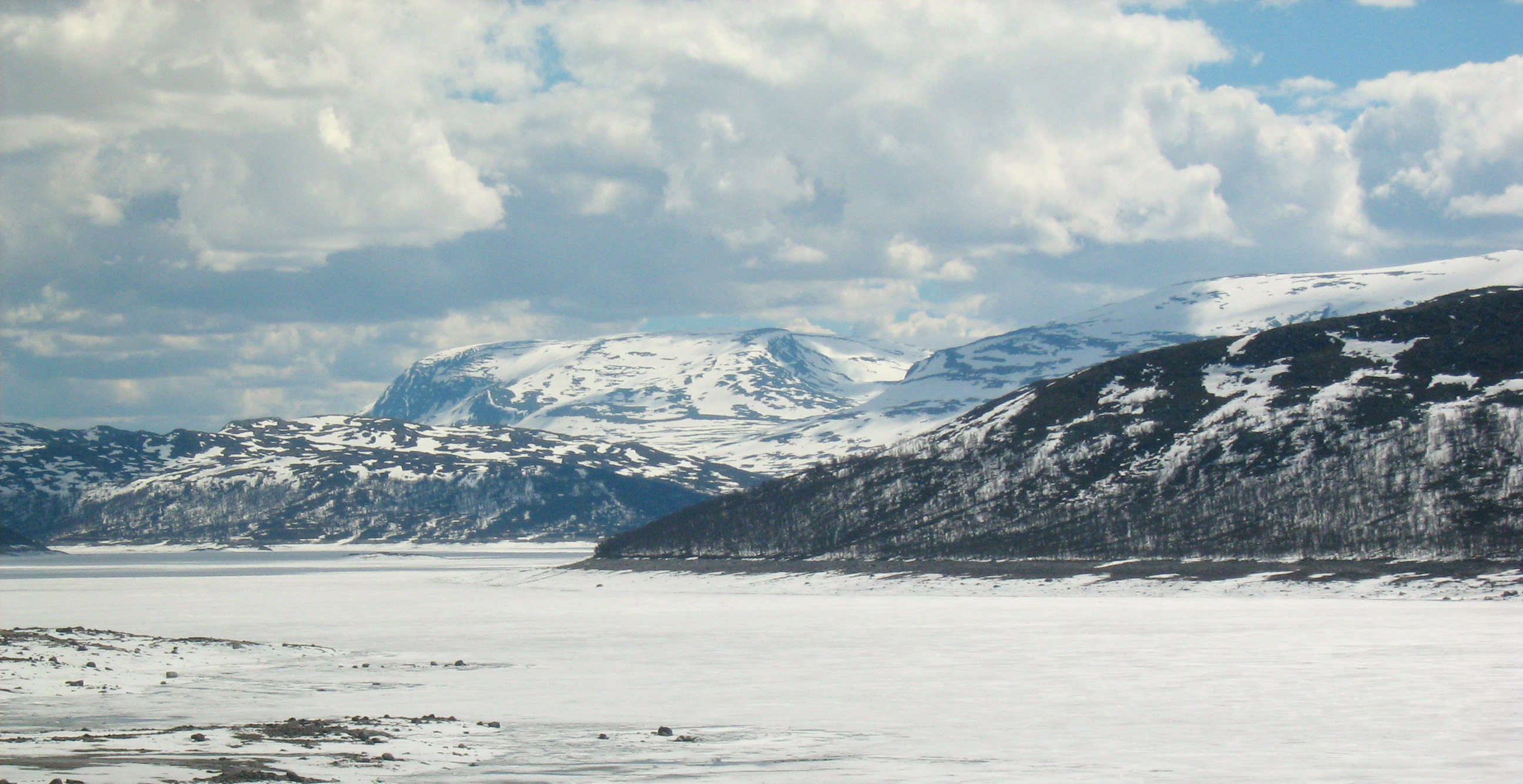
Strandavatnet lake, Hallingskarvet National Park

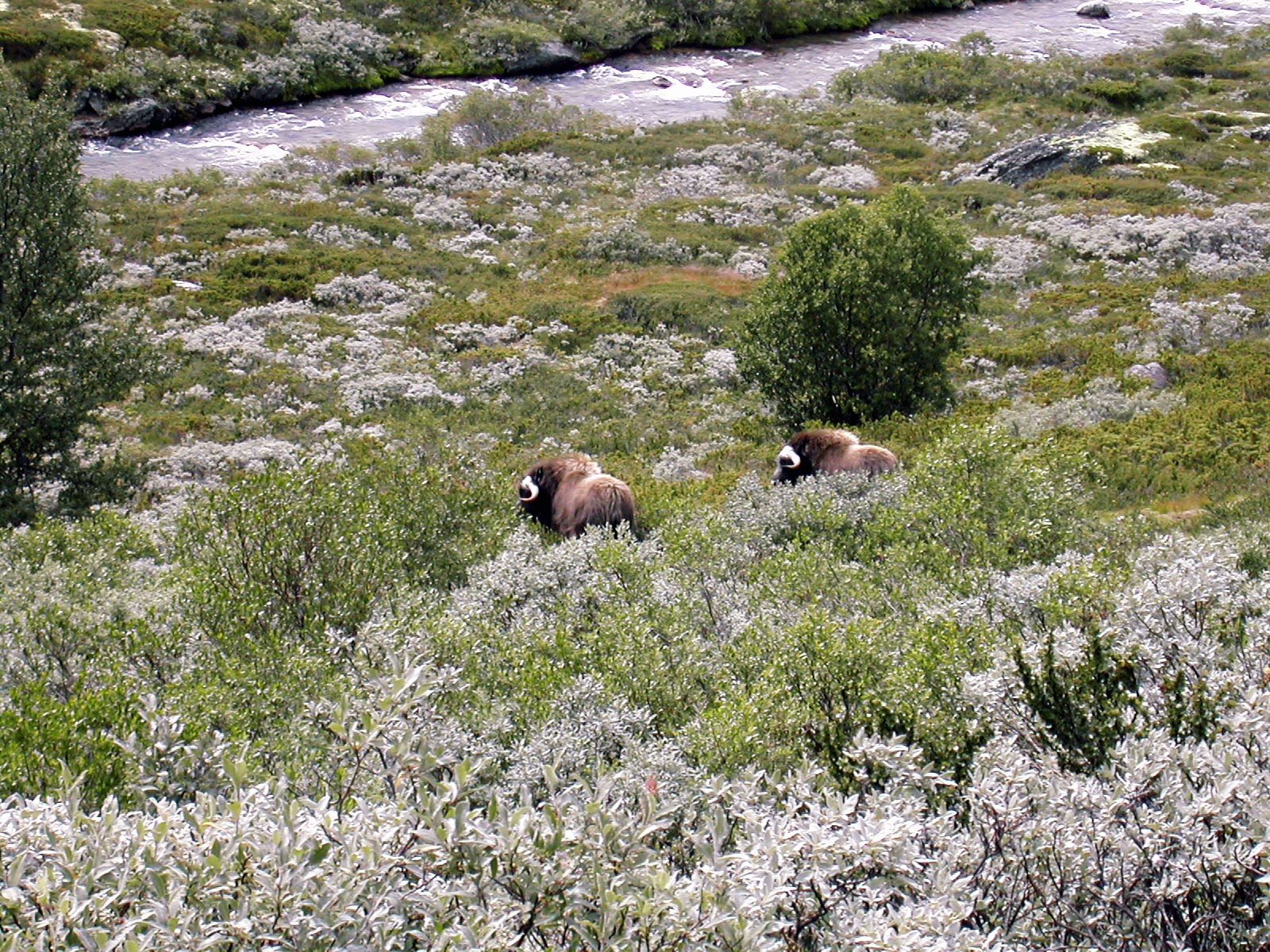
Muskox in Dovrefjell-Sunndalsfjella National Park

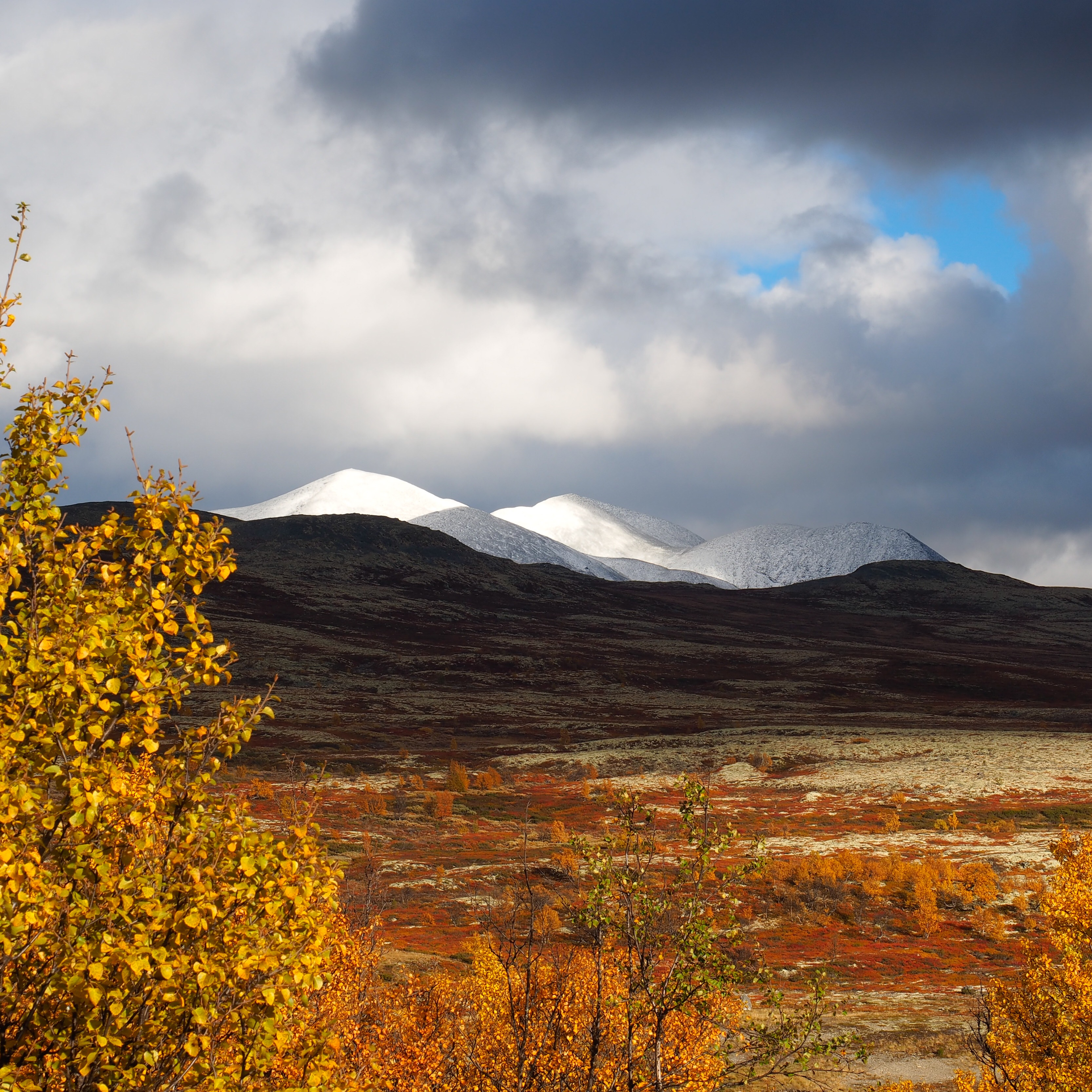
Autumn in Rondane National Park

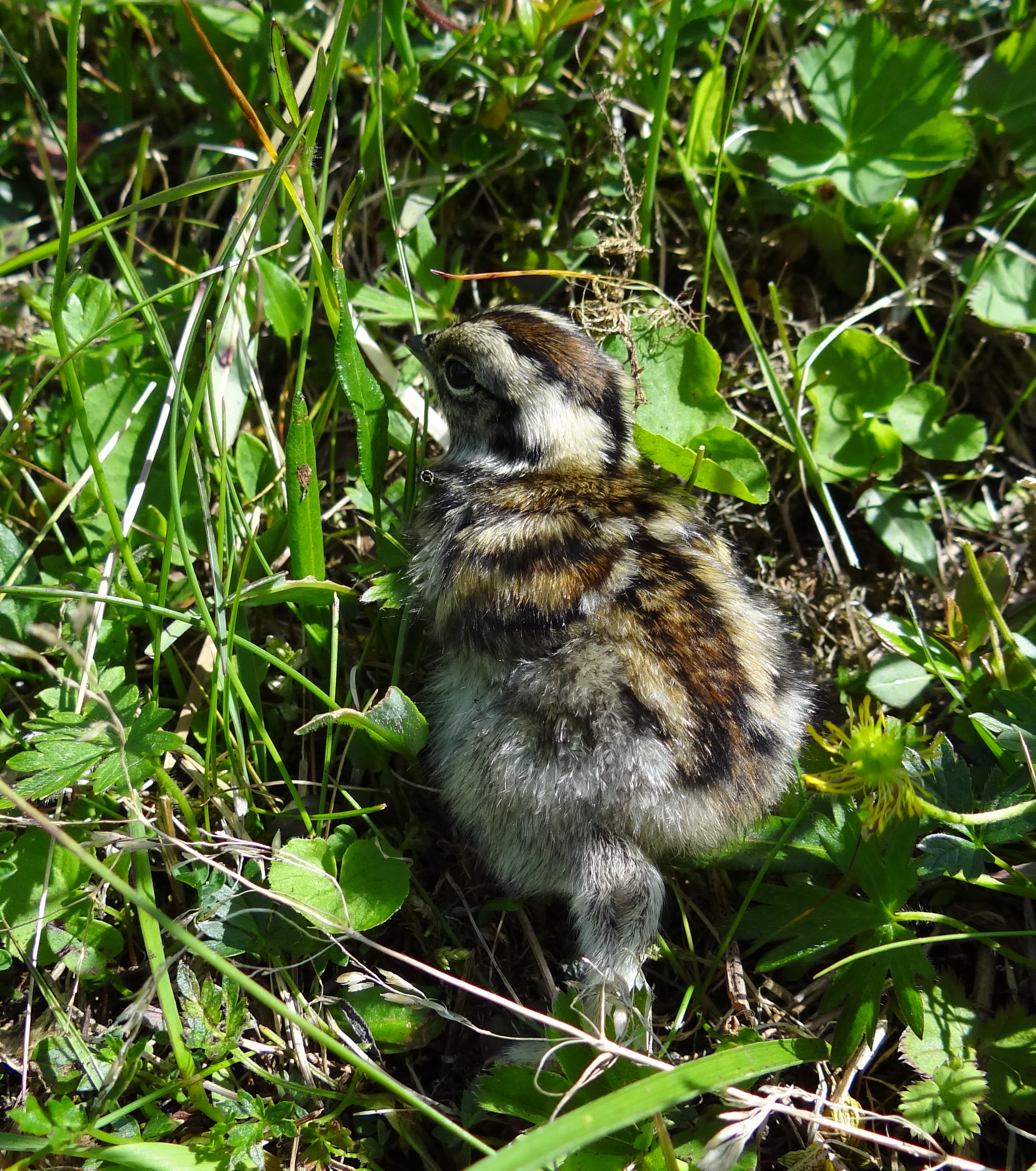
Rock Ptarmigan chick, Rohkunborri National Park

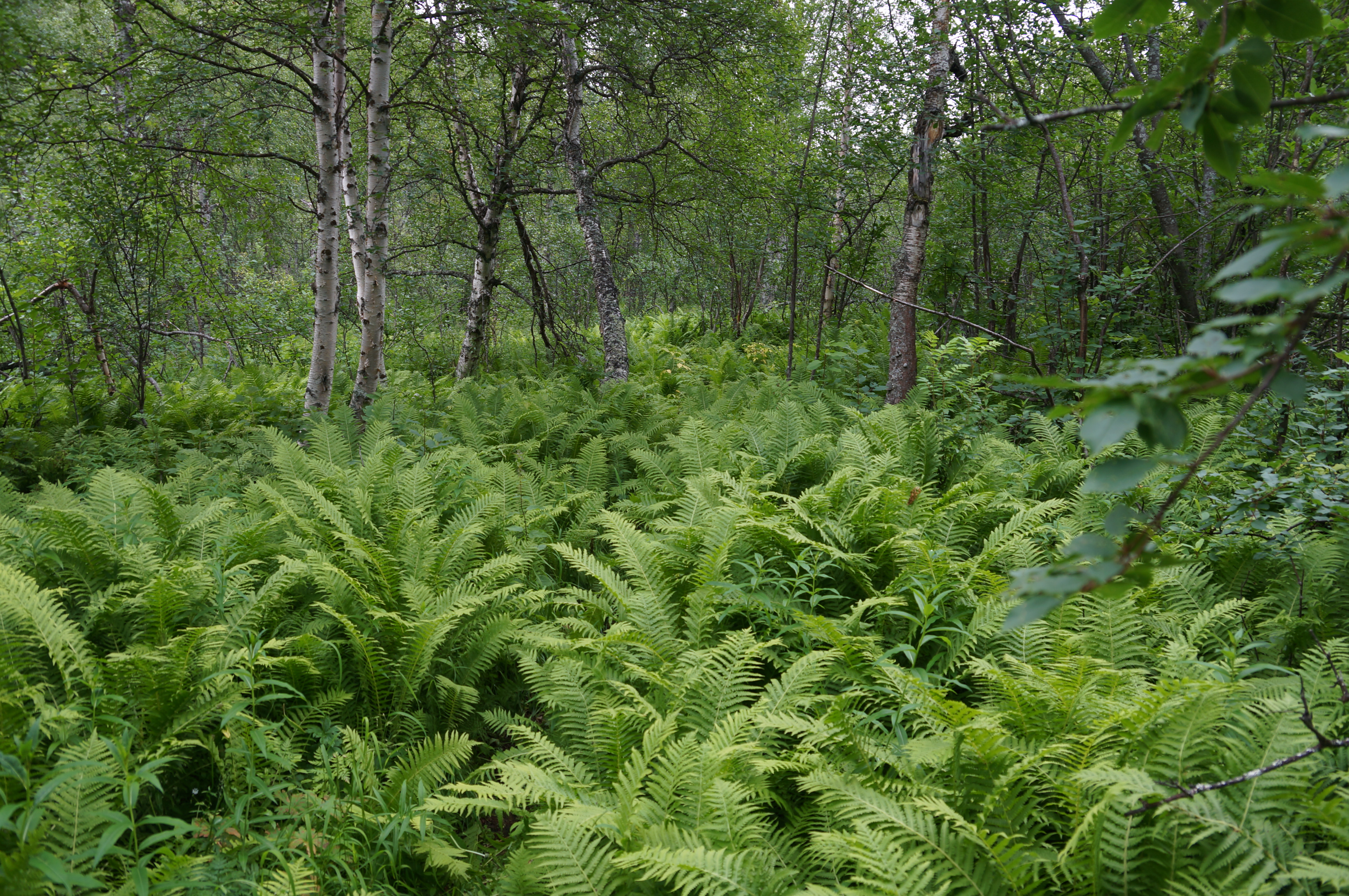
Birch forest with understory, Reisa National Park

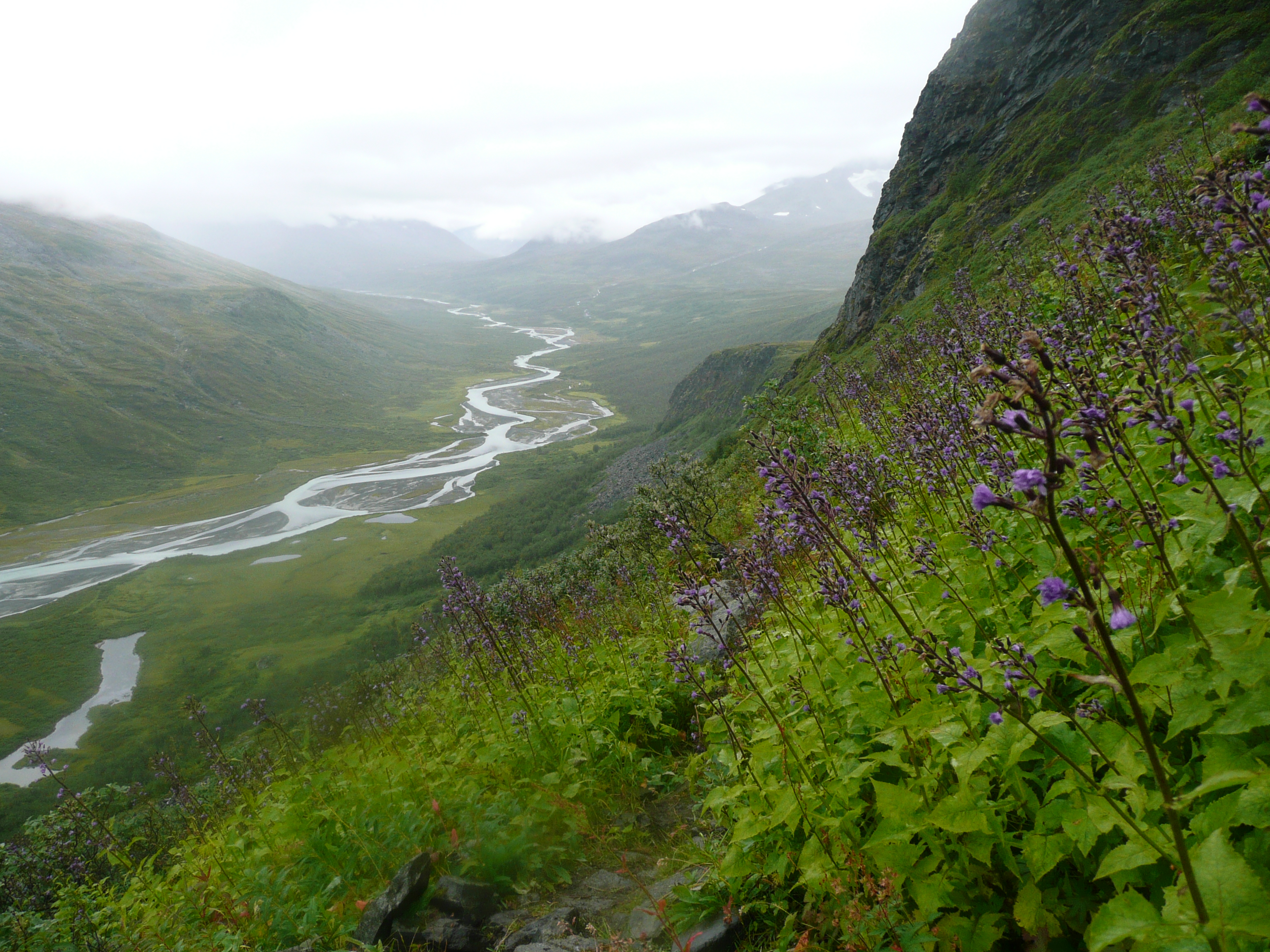
Alpine flowers in Sarek National Park

Lapporten, U-shaped valley, formed by the ice age, east of Abisko National Park
