= Scandinavian and Russian taiga =

Ecoregion in Northern Europe

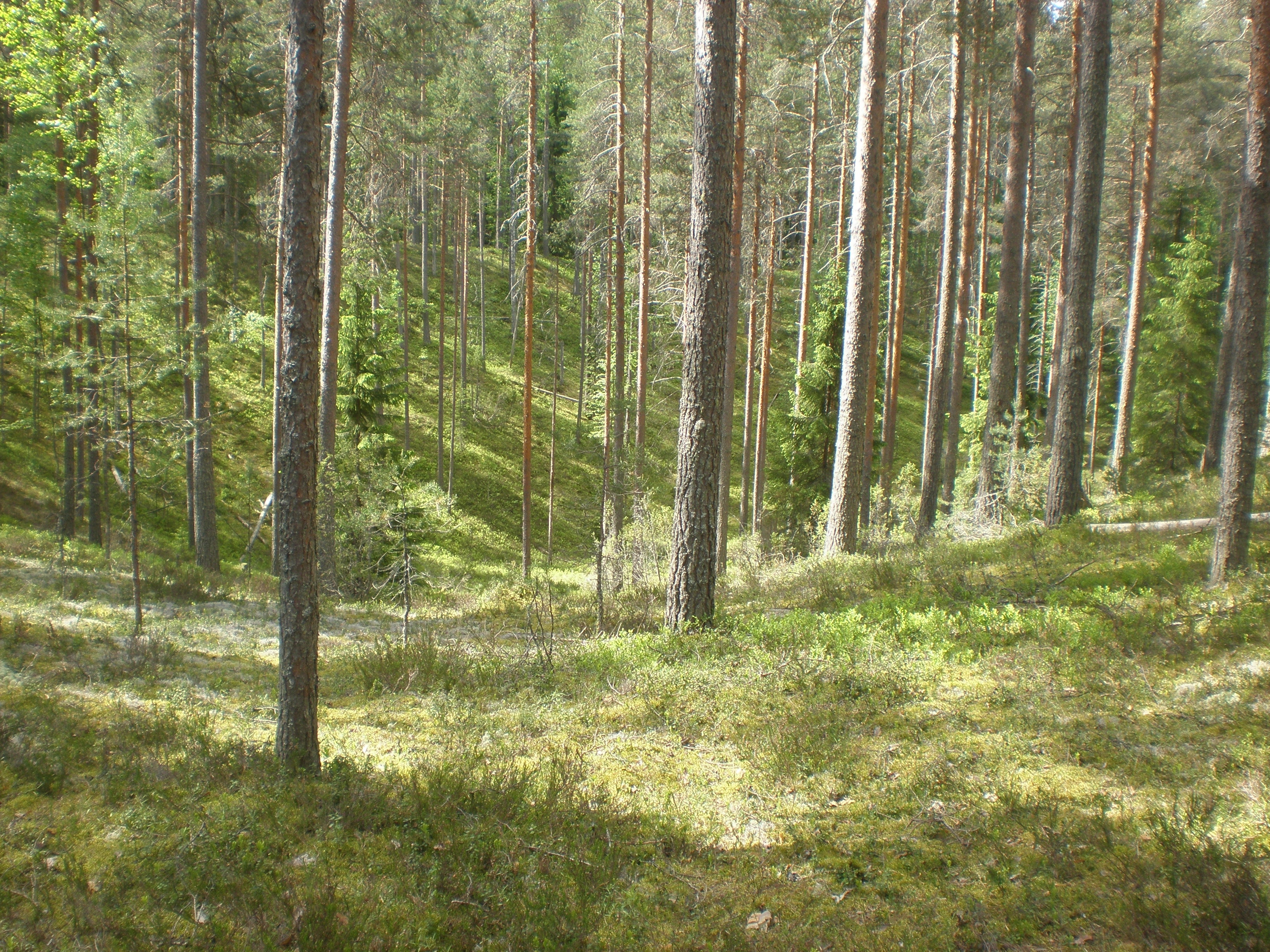
- Forest of Pinus sylvestris with an understory of Calluna vulgaris in Leivonmäki National Park, Finland

- Map of ecoregion in northeastern Europe

Ecology
- Realm: Palearctic
- Biome: Taiga
- Borders: List: Scandinavian coastal conifer forests; Scandinavian montane birch forest and grasslands; Kola Peninsula tundra; Northwest Russian-Novaya Zemlya tundra; Urals montane tundra and taiga; Sarmatic mixed forests

Geography
- Area: 2,150,900 km^{2} (830,500 mi^{2})

The Scandinavian and Russian taiga is an ecoregion within the taiga and boreal forests biome as defined by the WWF classification (ecoregion PA0608). It is situated in Northern Europe between tundra in the north, temperate mixed forests in the south and the Urals montane tundra and taiga in the east. It occupies about 2,156,900 km^{2} (832,800 mi^{2}) in Norway, Sweden, Finland and the northern part of European Russia, being the largest ecoregion in Europe. In Sweden the taiga is primarily associated with the Norrland terrain. The European Natura 2000 directive defines "Scandinavian and Russian taiga" as a broader area than the WWF, including parts of the temperate mixed forests in the region.

== Description ==
Geobotanically, the Scandinavian and Russian taiga belongs to the Northeastern European floristic province of the Circumboreal Region of the Holarctic Kingdom.

The ecoregion consists mainly of coniferous forests dominated by pine and spruce, with a mixture of siberian spruce and siberian larch in the eastern parts of the ecoregion. One characteristic ecosystem is the fire-tolerant pine forest. Fire-intolerant spruce dominate in very wet habitats. However, on acid peatlands in areas with low nutrition, pine thrive over spruce. Birch, European aspen, gray alder, and goat willow are notable deciduous trees in the ecoregion, especially in riparian zones. The understory normally consists of tree saplings of different species. Common juniper is a typical shrub species in drier habitats. Peatlands are common in the ecoregion and some can cover vast areas.

Growing season in taiga areas is generally considered to be measured as the number of days for which average daily temperature exceeds 5 °C (41 °F). The longest growing season for the Scandinavian and Russian taiga occurs in the locales with marine influence from the North Sea and Baltic Sea: in coastal areas of Norway, Sweden and Finland the growing season of the closed boreal forest can reach as high as 145 to 180 days per annum. The shortest growing season of the ecoregion is found in continental Russia and at the far northern part of the ecoregion at the ecotone with tundra.

Soil nutrient levels are generally poor, but diversity of soil organisms can attain high levels, particularly in the southern reaches of the ecoregion. In these southern elements of the ecoregion, closed canopy boreal forest with some temperate deciduous tree species interspersed among the dominant conifers, including maple, elm and oak. In some areas of Norway, Sweden, Finland and western Russia, this zone is exploited for agriculture.

The ecoregion is rich in lakes and wetlands, as exemplified by the Femundsmarka National Park in Norway, which is replete with marshes and lakes. Many wetland areas, such as the Pinega Nature Reserve in Russia, are important breeding grounds for birds

== Biodiversity ==
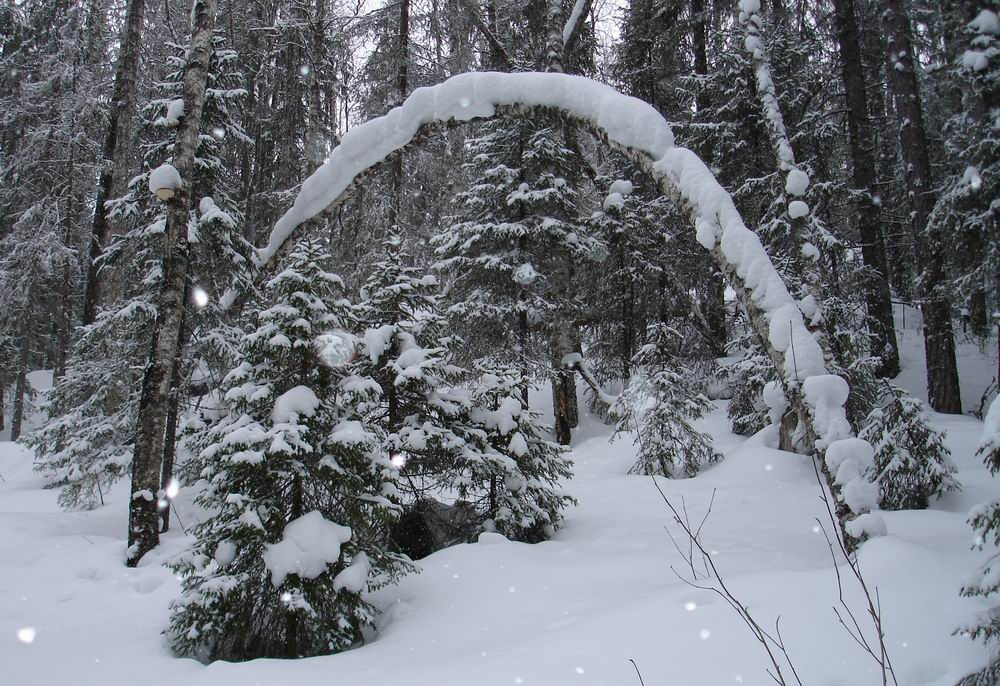
Taiga forest near Arkhangelsk

Much of the ecoregion has been repeatedly been affected by glaciation, with the last glaciation covering a large fraction of the area. The widespread glaciation eliminated pre-existing flora, hence the biodiversity of the area is low. There are few endemic species in the ecoregion.

There are a total of 368 native vertebrate species in the Scandinavian and Russian taiga according to WWF tabulation; when all migratory bird species are included, this number is somewhat larger.

There are a number of special status mammals, birds and plants within the Scandinavian and Russian taiga, including the following native non-endemic threatened mammals:

- European mink (Mustela lutreola, Endangered)
- European otter (Lutra lutra, Near Threatened)
- garden dormouse (Eliomys quercinus, Near Threatened)
- Greater noctule bat (Nyctalus lasiopterus, Near Threatened)
- pond bat (Myotis dasycneme, Near Threatened)
- western barbastelle (Barbastella barbastellus, Vulnerable)
- Russian desman (Desmana moschata, Vulnerable)

The Scandinavian and Russian taiga has only a single non-endemic special status native reptile: the Lower Risk grass snake (Natrix natrix).

Native non-endemic threatened avian species in the ecoregion are:

- aquatic warbler (Acrocephalus paludicola, Vulnerable)
- black-tailed godwit (Limosa limosa, Near Threatened)
- Eurasian curlew (Numenius arquata, Near Threatened)
- European roller (Coracias garrulus, Near Threatened)
- great snipe (Gallinago media, Near Threatened)
- greater spotted eagle (Aquila clanga, Vulnerable)
- lesser white-fronted goose (Anser erythropus, Vulnerable)
- red-footed falcon (Falco vespertinus, Near Threatened)
- yellow-breasted bunting (Emberiza aureola, Vulnerable)

== Protected areas ==
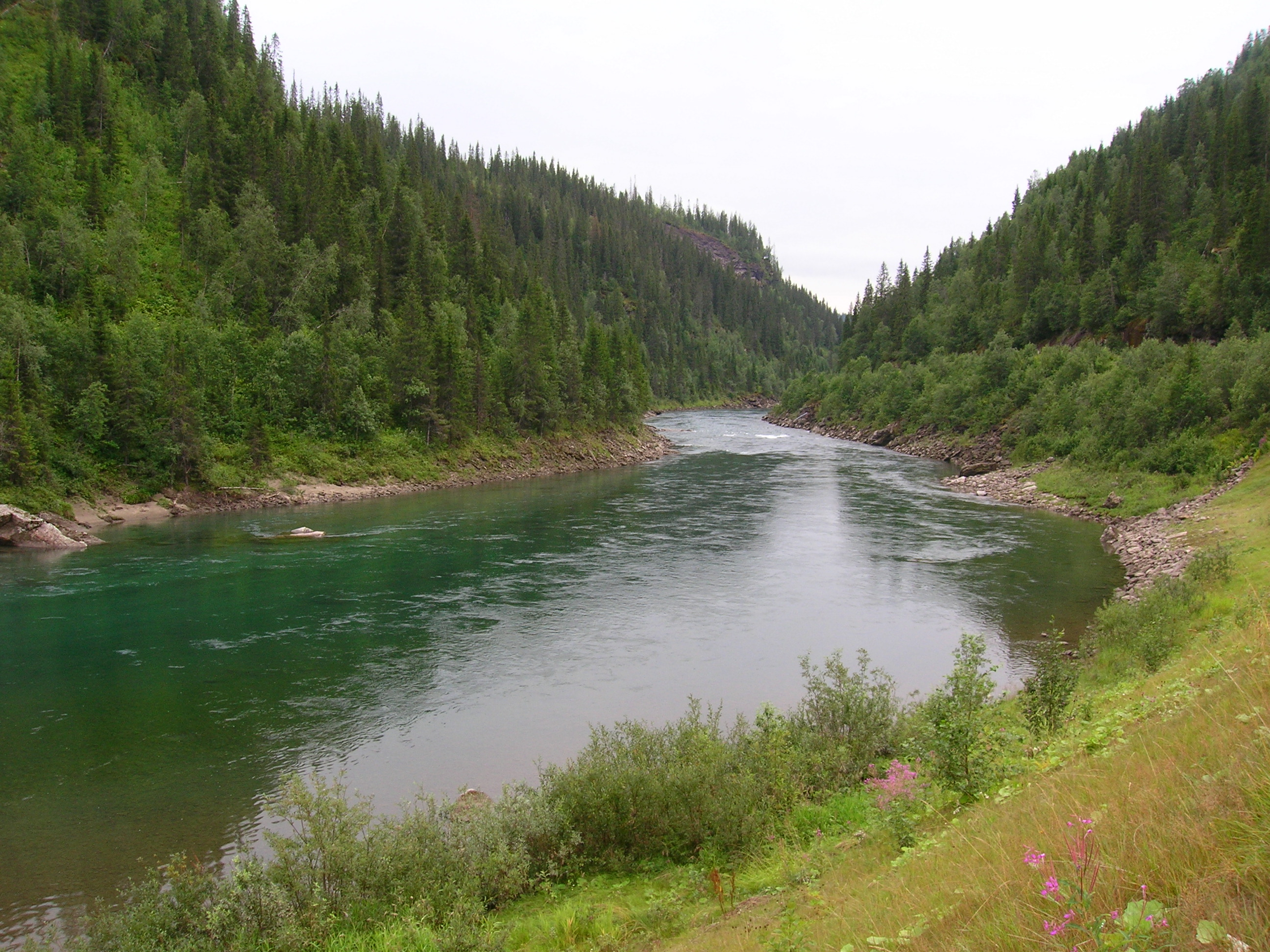
There are many rivers and lakes in the Taiga. Norwegian closed-canopy boreal forest at the Arctic Circle in Rana Municipality.

The following is a partial list of protected areas lying within the Scandinavian and Russian taiga:

- Björnlandet National Park, Sweden
- Femundsmarka National Park, Norway
- Helvetinjärvi National Park, Finland
- Isojärvi National Park, Finland
- Koli National Park, Finland
- Liesjärvi National Park, Finland
- Muddus National Park, Sweden
- Paanajärvi National Park, Russia
- Skuleskogen National Park, Sweden
- Vodlozersky National Park, Russia

== Gallery ==
Photographs - Scandinavian and Russian taiga

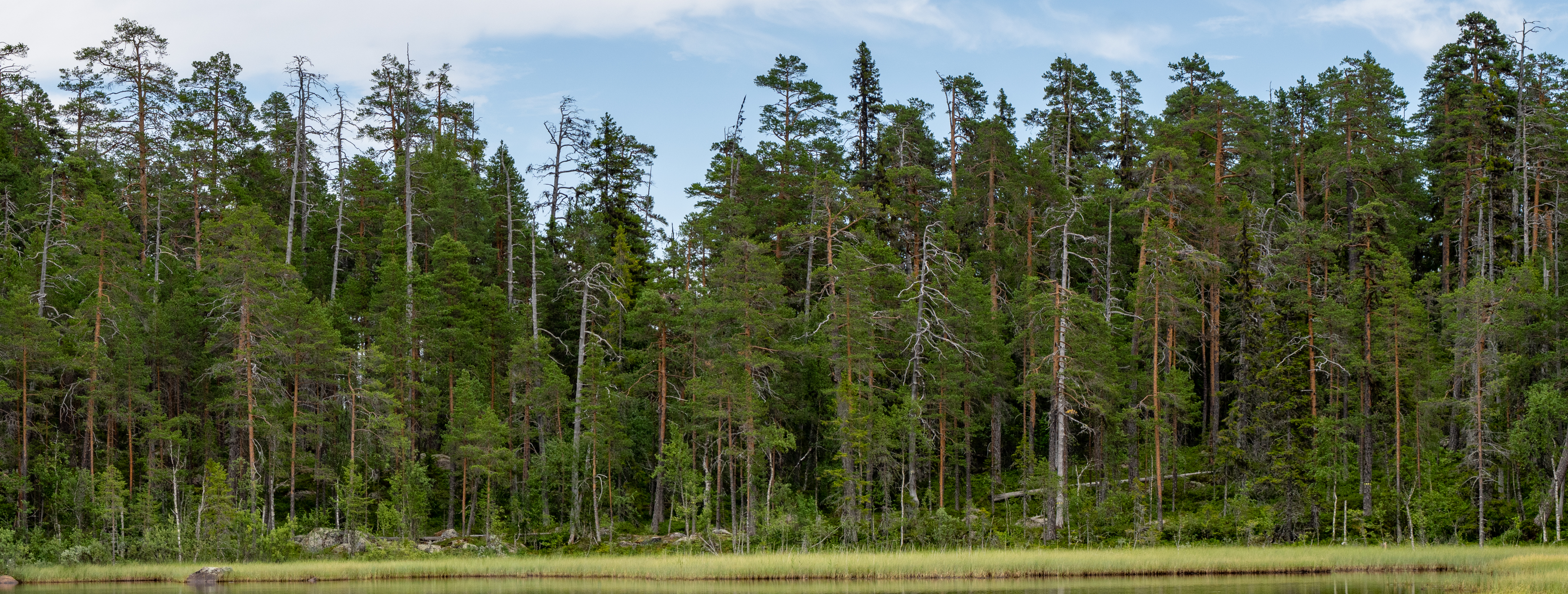
Pine that has never been affected by deforestation: Hamra National Park.

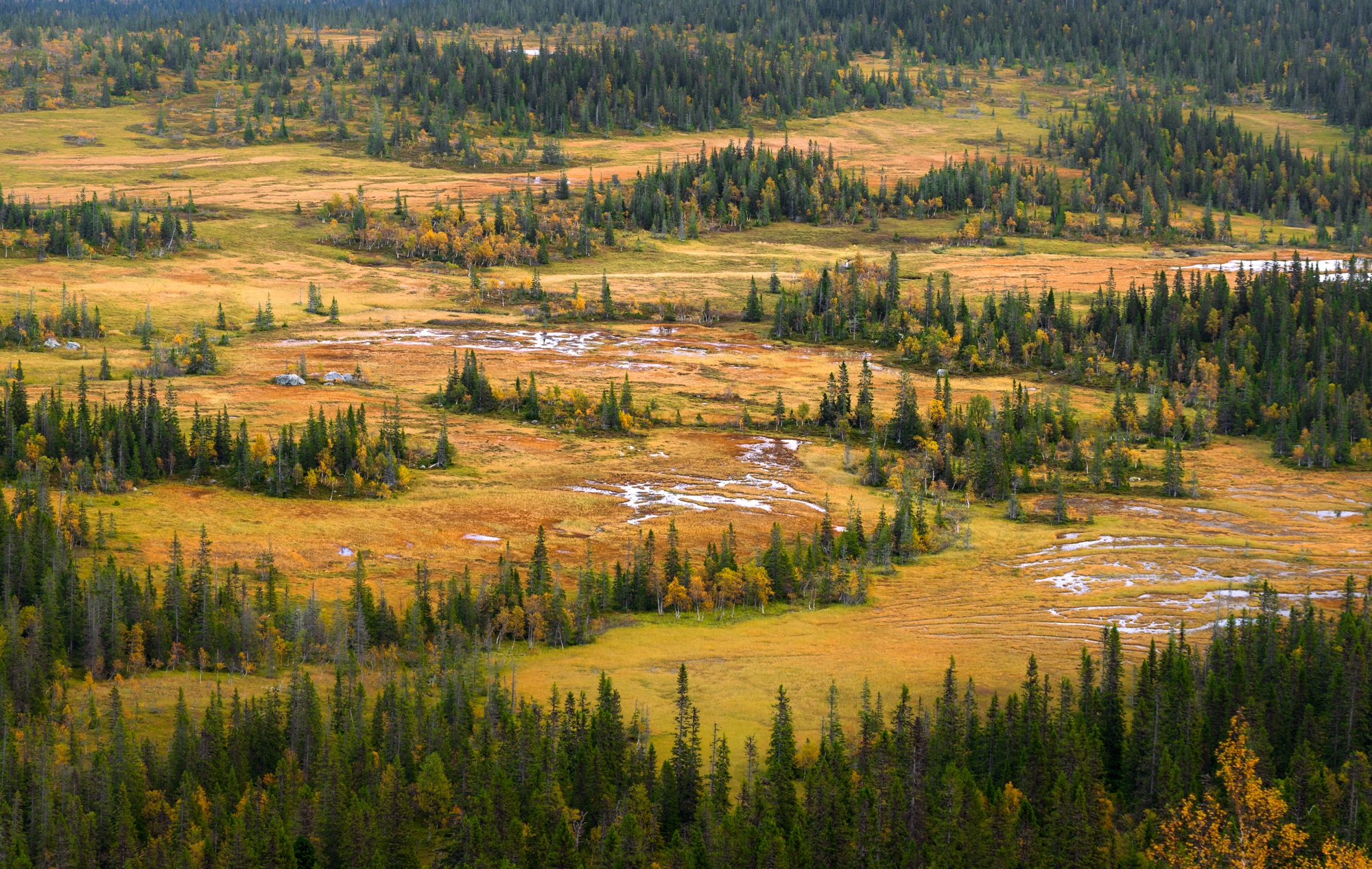
Spruce forest and mires which covers a large portion of the region.
