= Drevja Municipality =

Former municipality in Nordland, Norway

Drevja Municipality Drevja herred
- Former municipality
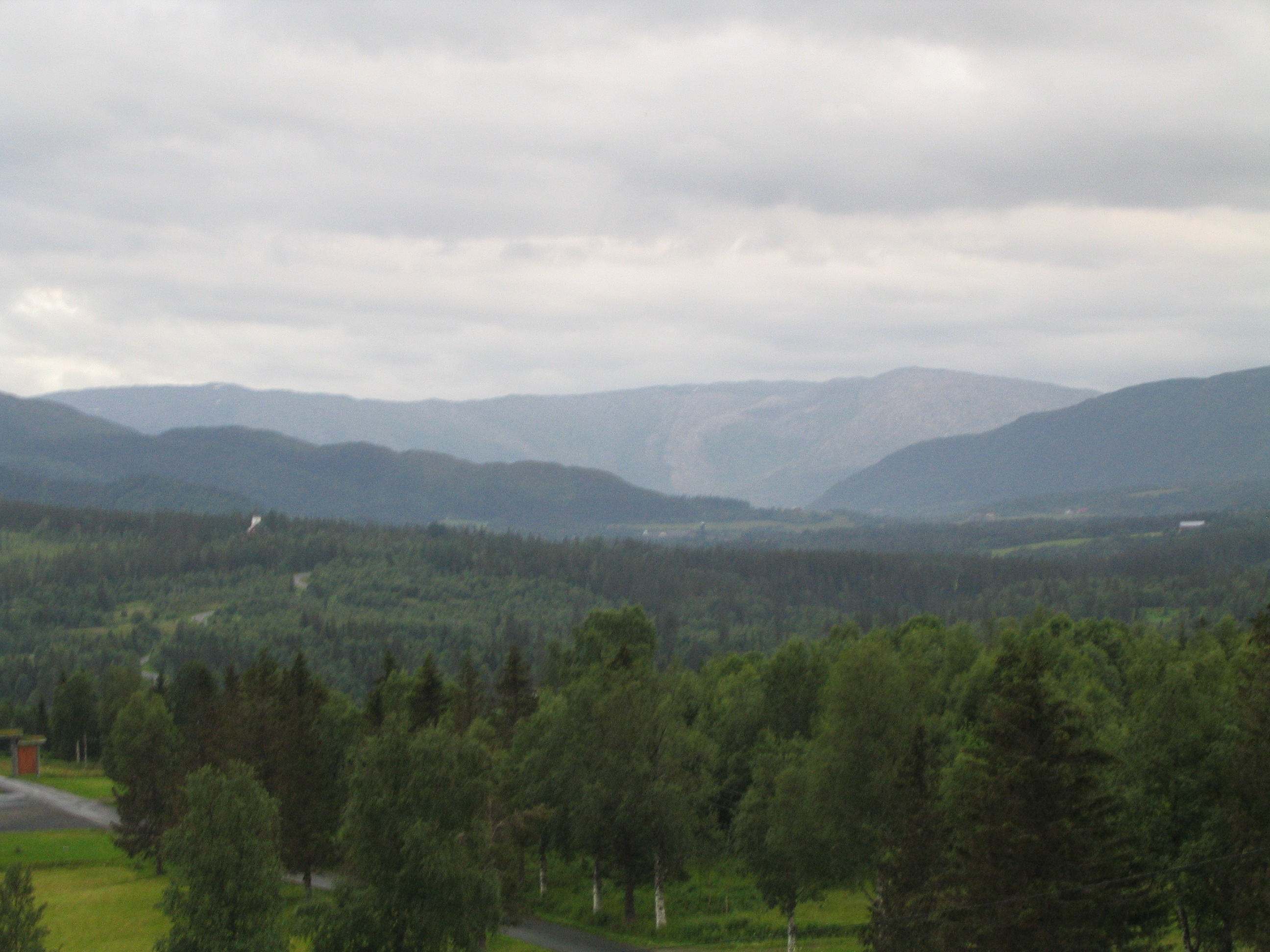
- The Drevje Valley as seen from Drevjamoen

- Nordland within Norway

- Drevja within Nordland
- Coordinates: 65°58′57″N 13°15′54″E
- Country: Norway
- County: Nordland
- District: Helgeland
- Established: 1 July 1927
  - Preceded by: Vefsn Municipality
- Disestablished: 1 Jan 1962
  - Succeeded by: Vefsn Municipality
- Administrative centre: Drevja

Government
  - Mayor (1960-1961): Ole J. Slåttrem (Ap)

Area (upon dissolution)
  - Total: 195.7 km^{2} (75.6 sq mi)
  - Rank: #381 in Norway
- Highest elevation: 1,348 m (4,423 ft)

Population (1961)
  - Total: 1,010
  - Rank: #641 in Norway
  - Density: 5.2/km^{2} (13/sq mi)
  - Change (10 years): ▼ −10.1%
- Demonym: Drevjafolk

Official language
  - Norwegian form: Nynorsk
- Time zone: UTC+01:00 (CET)
  - Summer (DST): UTC+02:00 (CEST)
- ISO 3166 code: NO-1823

Drevja is a former municipality in Nordland county, Norway. The municipality existed from 1927 until its dissolution in 1962. It was located in the Drevja valley, north of the Vefsnfjorden in the northern part of the present-day Vefsn Municipality. Drevja Church was the main church for the municipality.

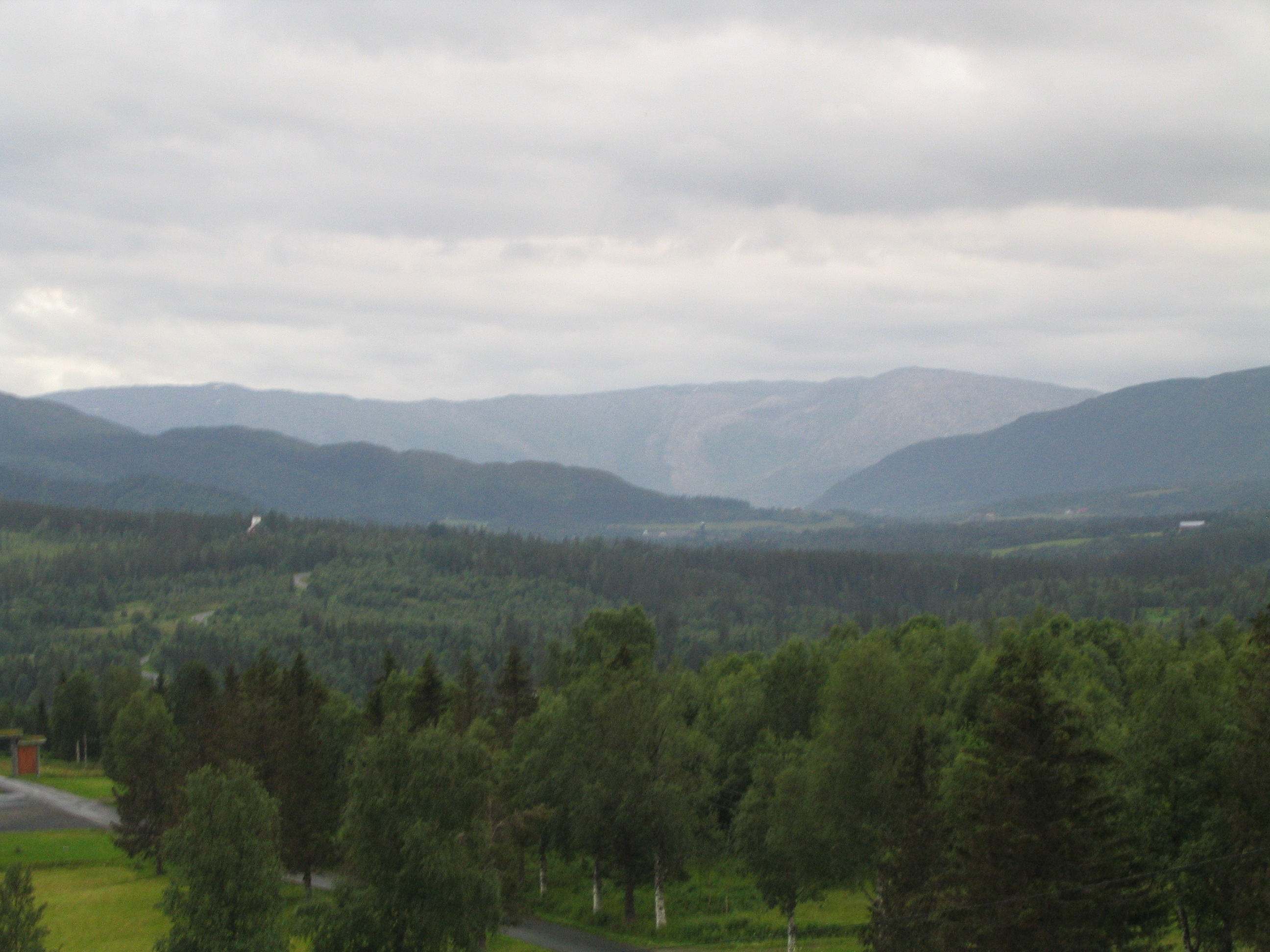
View of the valley in which Drevja Municipality was located

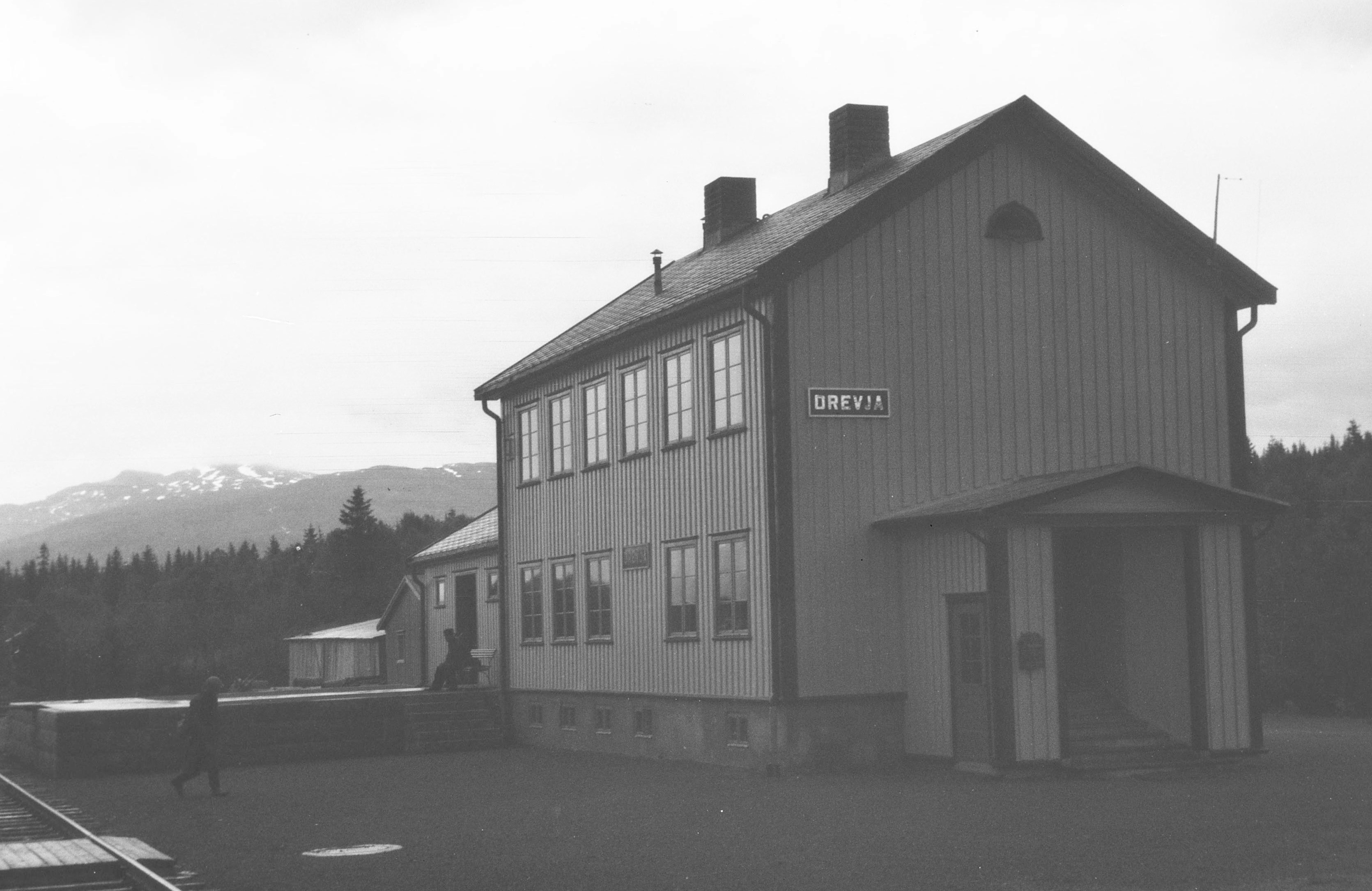
Drevja railway station

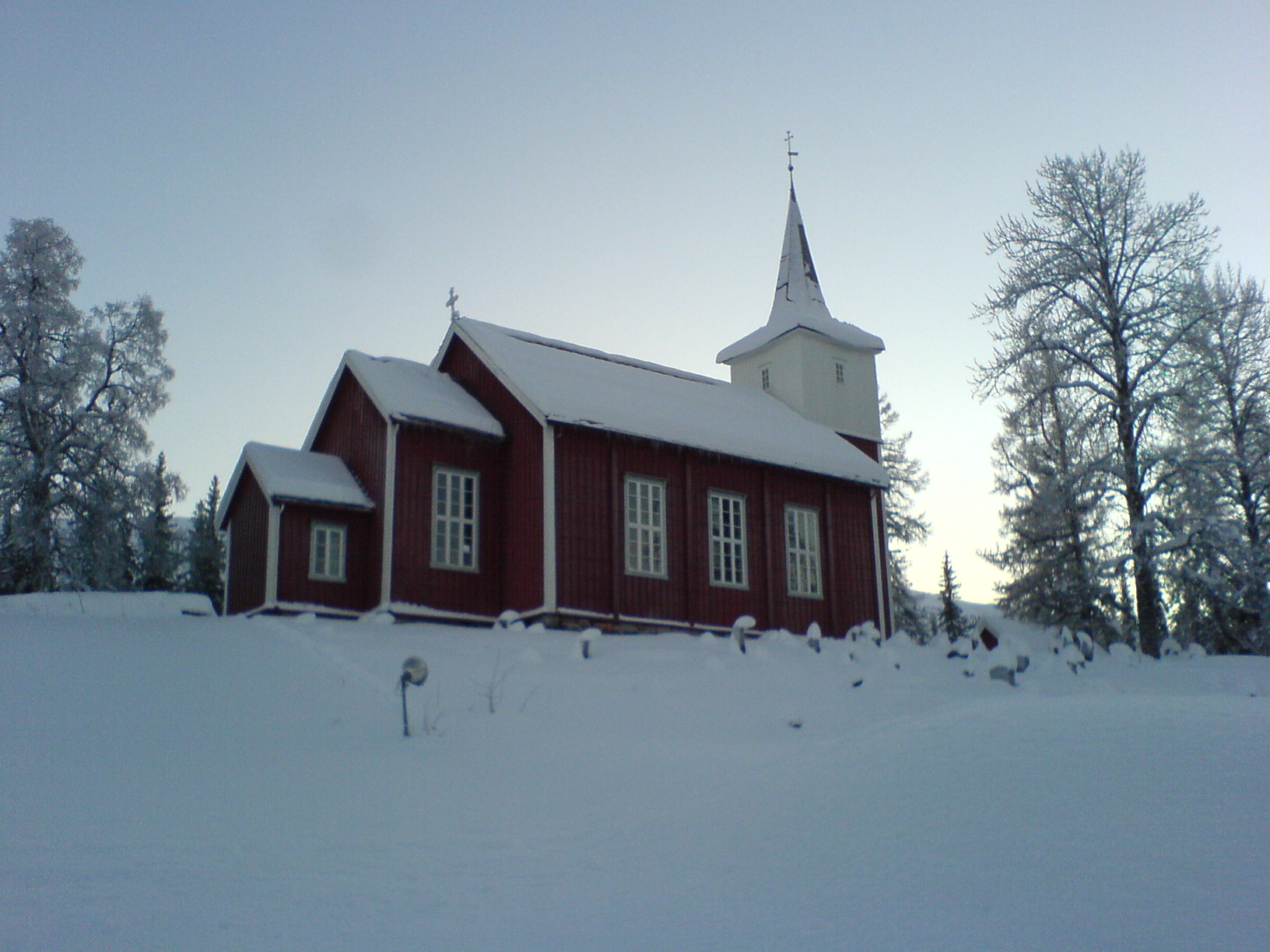
Drevja Church

Prior to its dissolution in 1962, the 196-square-kilometre (76 sq mi) municipality was the 381st largest by area out of the 731 municipalities in Norway. Drevja Municipality was the 641st most populous municipality in Norway with a population of about 1,010. The municipality's population density was 5.2 inhabitants per square kilometre (13/sq mi) and its population had decreased by 10.1% over the previous 10-year period.

== General information ==
The municipality of Drevja was established on 1 July 1927 when the large Vefsn Municipality was divided into three municipalities: Drevja Municipality (population: 964) in the north, Grane Municipality (population: 1,746) in the south, and Vefsn Municipality (population: 3,119) in the center.

During the 1960s, there were many municipal mergers across Norway due to the work of the Schei Committee. On 1 January 1962, Drevja Municipality (population: 1,001) was merged with the neighboring Elsfjord Municipality (population: 920) and Vefsn Municipality (population: 5,358) and with the town of Mosjøen) to form a new, larger Vefsn Municipality.

During the German occupation of Norway (World War II), the occupiers operated a subcamp of the Stalag 380 prisoner-of-war camp in Drevja.

=== Etymology ===
The municipality was named after the river Drevja which flows from the lake Drevvatnet to the Vefsnfjorden. The name of the river is derived from the word drav which means "rubbish" or "waste". Thus the meaning of the name is something like "the river with unclean water".

=== Churches ===
The Church of Norway had one parish (sokn) within Drevja Municipality. At the time of the municipal dissolution, it was part of the Vefsn prestegjeld and the Indre Helgeland prosti (deanery) in the Diocese of Sør-Hålogaland.

Churches in Drevja Municipality
Parish (sokn)	Church name	Location of the church	Year built
Drevja	Drevja Church	Nillskogen	1883

== Geography ==
The highest point in the municipality was the 1,348-metre (4,423 ft) tall mountain Lukttinden on the border with Elsfjord Municipality.

== Government ==
While it existed, Drevja Municipality was responsible for primary education (through 10th grade), outpatient health services, senior citizen services, welfare and other social services, zoning, economic development, and municipal roads and utilities. The municipality was governed by a municipal council of directly elected representatives. The mayor was indirectly elected by a vote of the municipal council. The municipality was under the jurisdiction of the Hålogaland Court of Appeal.

=== Municipal council ===
The municipal council (Herredsstyre) of Drevja Municipality was made up of 13 representatives that were elected to four year terms. The tables below show the historical composition of the council by political party.

Drevja herredsstyre 1959–1963
Party name (in Norwegian)	Number of representatives
Labour Party (Arbeiderpartiet)	7
Local List(s) (Lokale lister)	6
Total number of members:	13
Note: On 1 January 1962, Drevja Municipality became part of Vefsn Municipality.

Drevja herredsstyre 1955–1959
Party name (in Norwegian)	Number of representatives
Labour Party (Arbeiderpartiet)	7
Joint List(s) of Non-Socialist Parties (Borgerlige Felleslister)	6
Total number of members:	13

Drevja herredsstyre 1951–1955
Party name (in Norwegian)	Number of representatives
Labour Party (Arbeiderpartiet)	7
Joint List(s) of Non-Socialist Parties (Borgerlige Felleslister)	5
Total number of members:	12

Drevja herredsstyre 1947–1951
Party name (in Norwegian)	Number of representatives
Labour Party (Arbeiderpartiet)	6
Communist Party (Kommunistiske Parti)	2
Farmers' Party (Bondepartiet)	3
List of workers, fishermen, and small farmholders (Arbeidere, fiskere, småbrukere liste)	1
Total number of members:	12

Drevja herredsstyre 1945–1947
Party name (in Norwegian)	Number of representatives
Labour Party (Arbeiderpartiet)	5
List of workers, fishermen, and small farmholders (Arbeidere, fiskere, småbrukere liste)	4
Local List(s) (Lokale lister)	3
Total number of members:	12

Drevja herredsstyre 1937–1941*
Party name (in Norwegian)	Number of representatives
Labour Party (Arbeiderpartiet)	7
Joint List(s) of Non-Socialist Parties (Borgerlige Felleslister)	4
Local List(s) (Lokale lister)	1
Total number of members:	12
Note: Due to the German occupation of Norway during World War II, no elections were held for new municipal councils until after the war ended in 1945.

=== Mayors ===
The mayor (Norwegian: ordfører) of Drevja Municipality was the political leader of the municipality and the chairperson of the municipal council. Here is a list of people who held this position:

- 1927–1931: Sigvald Almlid
- 1932–1934: Ole Justad
- 1935–1940: Martin Hvidsten
- 1941–1942: Ottar Almlid
- 1943–1945: Egil Brattbakk
- 1945–1946: Martin Hvidsten
- 1946–1951: Carl P. Schancke
- 1952–1956: Thorvald Enge
- 1956–1957: Ottar Almlid
- 1958–1959: Martin Hvidsten
- 1960–1961: Ole J. Slåttrem (Ap)

== See also ==
- List of former municipalities of Norway
