= Drevvassbygda =

Village in Vefsn Municipality, Norway

- Village
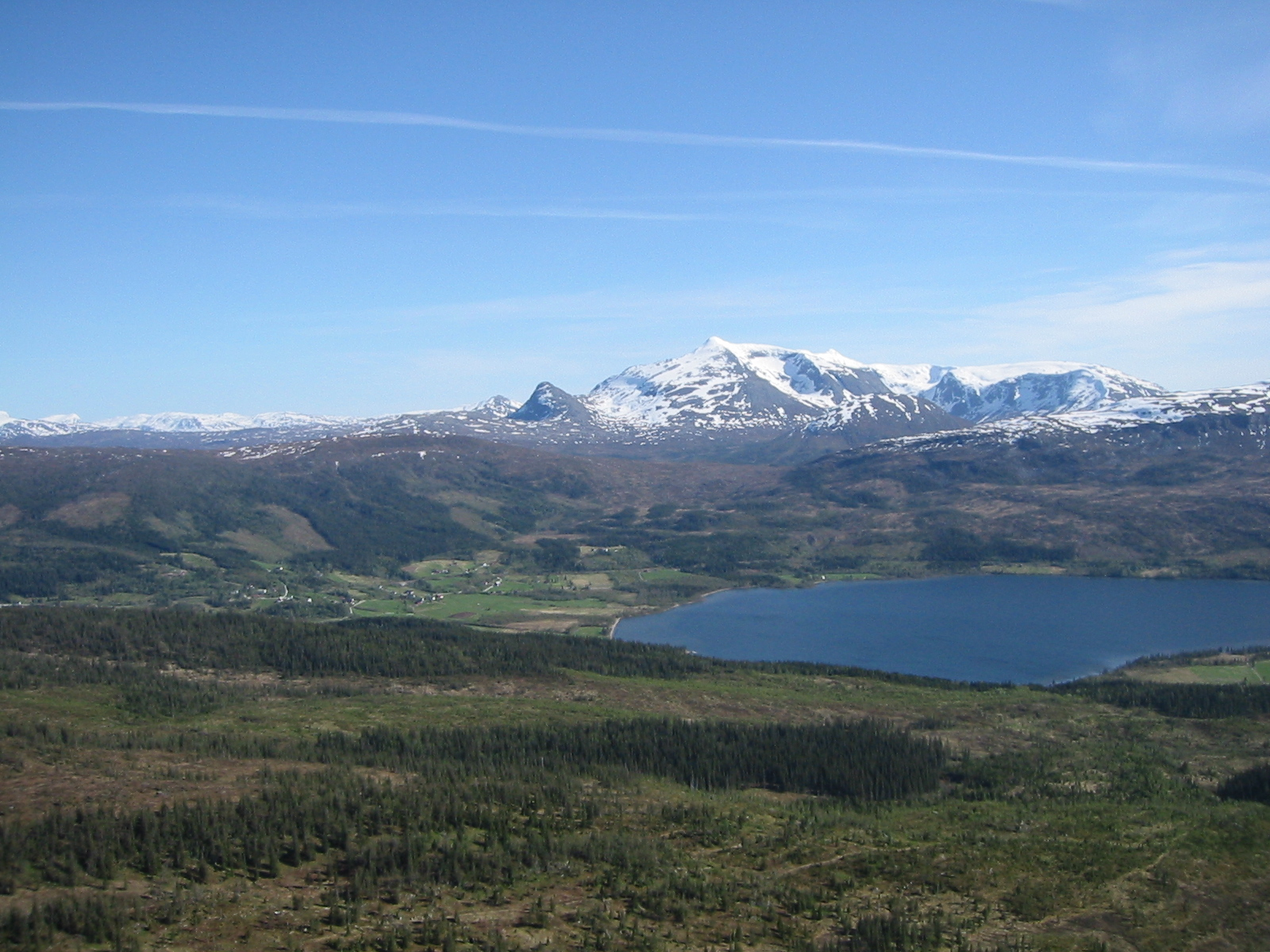
- View of the village
- Interactive map of Drevvassbygda
- Location within Nordland Location within Norway
- Coordinates: 66.0713°N 13.4530°E
- Country: Norway
- Region: Northern Norway
- County: Nordland
- District: Helgeland
- Municipality: Vefsn Municipality
- Elevation: 82 m (269 ft)
- Time zone: UTC+01:00 (CET)
  - Summer (DST): UTC+02:00 (CEST)
- Post Code: 8672 Elsfjord

Drevvassbygda is a village in Vefsn Municipality in Nordland county, Norway. It is located along the northeastern shore of the lake Drevvatnet, about 7 kilometres (4.3 mi) southwest of the village Elsfjord in what used to be the separate Elsfjord Municipality. The village is the location of Drevvatn Station on the Nordland Line, between the town of Mosjøen and the village of Bjerka.
