= Finnknevatnet =

Lake in Vefsn, Norway

Finnknevatnet (Norwegian) Saemienboelve (Southern Sami) Boelvenjaevrie (Southern Sami)
- Interactive map of the lake
- Location: Vefsn Municipality, Nordland
- Coordinates: 65.7364°N 12.8717°E
- Basin countries: Norway
- Max. length: 3.4 kilometres (2.1 mi)
- Max. width: 2.4 kilometres (1.5 mi)
- Surface area: 3.79 km^{2} (1.46 sq mi)
- Shore length^{1}: 10.94 kilometres (6.80 mi)
- Surface elevation: 325 metres (1,066 ft)
- References: NVE
- ^{1} Shore length is not a well-defined measure.

Finnknevatnet (Norwegian) or Saemienboelve or Boelvenjaevrie (Southern Sami) is a lake that lies in Vefsn Municipality in Nordland county, Norway. The water flows out of the 3.79-square-kilometre (1.46 sq mi) lake to the north into the lake Hundålvatnet. It is located just north of the Lomsdal–Visten National Park.

== See also ==
- List of lakes in Norway
- Geography of Norway
