= Hundålvatnet =

Lake in Nordland county, Norway

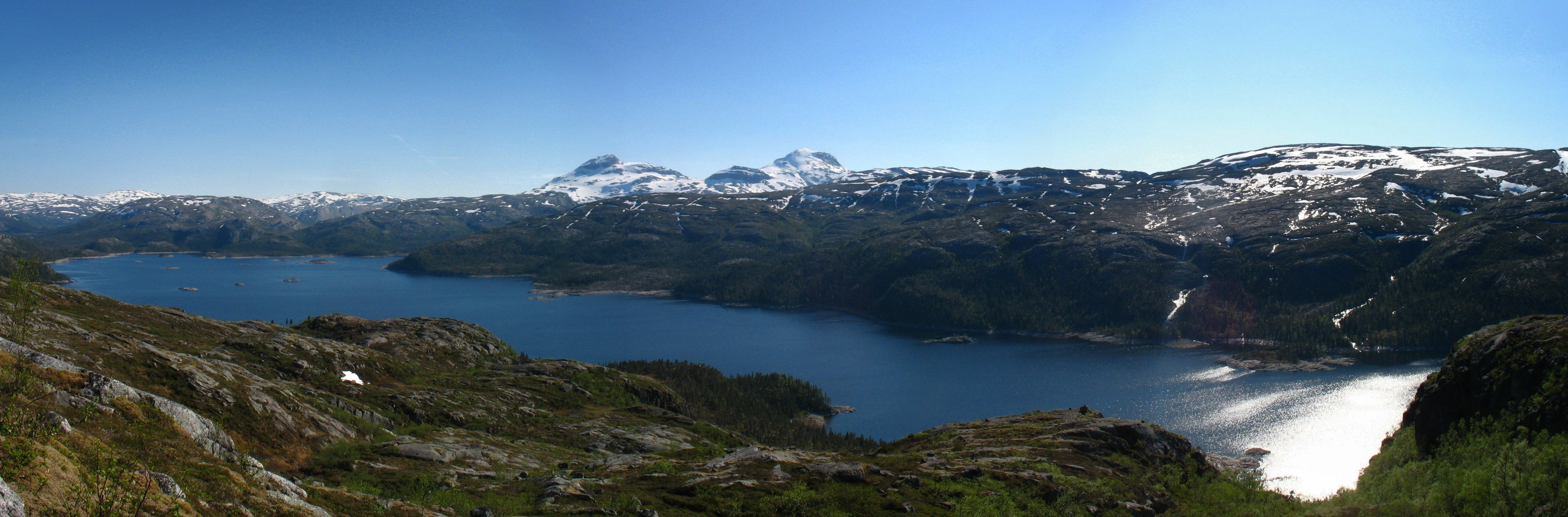
- Interactive map of the lake
- Location: Vefsn Municipality, Nordland
- Coordinates: 65.8188°N 12.9237°E
- Basin countries: Norway
- Max. length: 9 kilometres (5.6 mi)
- Max. width: 2 kilometres (1.2 mi)
- Surface area: 7.96 km^{2} (3.07 sq mi)
- Shore length^{1}: 28.5 kilometres (17.7 mi)
- Surface elevation: 200 metres (660 ft)
- References: NVE
- ^{1} Shore length is not a well-defined measure.

Hundålvatnet is a lake that lies in Vefsn Municipality in Nordland county, Norway. The 7.96-square-kilometre (3.07 sq mi) lake lies in the western part of the municipality, about 12 kilometres (7.5 mi) west of the town of Mosjøen. It is located just north of the Lomsdal–Visten National Park. The lake flows into the Hundåla river which flows north into the Vefsnfjorden.

== See also ==
- List of lakes in Norway
- Geography of Norway
