= Luktvatnet =

Lake in Vefsn, Norway

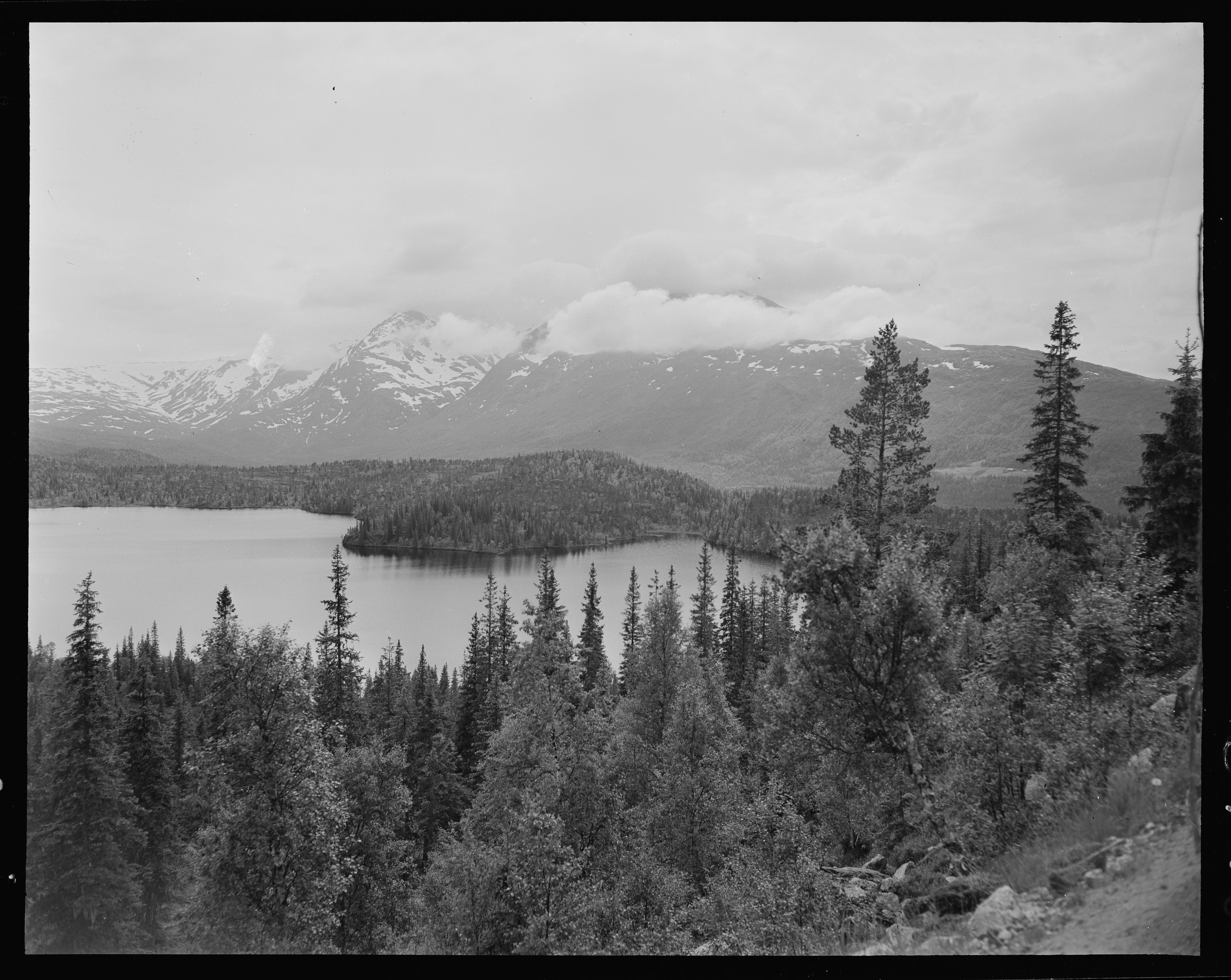
- Interactive map of the lake
- Location: Vefsn Municipality, Nordland
- Coordinates: 66.0404°N 13.5776°E
- Basin countries: Norway
- Max. length: 3.4 kilometres (2.1 mi)
- Max. width: 2 kilometres (1.2 mi)
- Surface area: 3.76 km^{2} (1.45 sq mi)
- Shore length^{1}: 18.65 kilometres (11.59 mi)
- Surface elevation: 137 metres (449 ft)
- References: NVE
- ^{1} Shore length is not a well-defined measure.

Luktvatnet is a lake that lies in the northern part of Vefsn Municipality in Nordland county, Norway. The 3.76-square-kilometre (1.45 sq mi) lake lies between the mountains Korgfjellet and Lukttinden, about 5 kilometres (3.1 mi) south of the village of Elsfjord. The European route E6 highway passes along the northern shore of the lake.

== Name ==
The name is probably from the Southern Sami language word Loektejaevrie. This is a compound of loekti which means "inlet" and jaevrie which means "lake", thus it is "the lake with many inlets".

== See also ==
- List of lakes in Norway
- Geography of Norway
