= Mjåvatnet =

Lake in Vefsn, Nordland, Norway

- Interactive map of the lake
- Location: Vefsn Municipality, Nordland
- Coordinates: 65.9507°N 13.4279°E
- Basin countries: Norway
- Max. length: 4.5 kilometres (2.8 mi)
- Max. width: 1 kilometre (0.62 mi)
- Surface area: 2.61 km^{2} (1.01 sq mi)
- Shore length^{1}: 11.95 kilometres (7.43 mi)
- Surface elevation: 39 metres (128 ft)
- References: NVE
- ^{1} Shore length is not a well-defined measure.

Mjåvatnet is a lake that lies in Vefsn Municipality in Nordland county, Norway. The long, skinny, 2.61-square-kilometre (1.01 sq mi) lake lies between the lakes Ømmervatnet and Fustvatnet, about 15 kilometres (9.3 mi) northeast of the town of Mosjøen. The European route E6 highway passes along the west coast of the lake.

== See also ==
- List of lakes in Norway
- Geography of Norway
