= Fustvatnet =

Lake in Vefsn, Norway

- Interactive map of the lake
- Location: Vefsn Municipality, Nordland
- Coordinates: 65.9048°N 13.3816°E
- Basin countries: Norway
- Max. length: 6.5 kilometres (4.0 mi)
- Max. width: 3.2 kilometres (2.0 mi)
- Surface area: 10.59 km^{2} (4.09 sq mi)
- Shore length^{1}: 27.91 kilometres (17.34 mi)
- Surface elevation: 39 metres (128 ft)
- References: NVE
- ^{1} Shore length is not a well-defined measure.

Fustvatnet is a lake that lies in Vefsn Municipality in Nordland county, Norway. The 10.59-square-kilometre (4.09 sq mi) lake lies just south of the lake Mjåvatnet, about 5 kilometres (3.1 mi) northeast of the town of Mosjøen. The European route E6 highway follows the northwestern coastline.

== See also ==
- List of lakes in Norway
- Geography of Norway
