= Elsfjord Municipality =

Former municipality in Nordland, Norway

Elsfjord Municipality Elsfjord herred
- Former municipality
- Nordland within Norway

- Elsfjord within Nordland
- Coordinates: 66.1032°N 13.5483°E
- Country: Norway
- County: Nordland
- District: Helgeland
- Established: 1 July 1929
  - Preceded by: Hemnes Municipality
- Disestablished: 1 Jan 1962
  - Succeeded by: Vefsn Municipality
- Administrative centre: Elsfjord

Government
  - Mayor (1961–1962): Torgeir Drevvatne

Area (upon dissolution)
  - Total: 286.98 km^{2} (110.80 sq mi)
  - Rank: #297 in Norway
- Highest elevation: 1,348 m (4,423 ft)

Population (1960)
  - Total: 893
  - Rank: #659 in Norway
  - Density: 3.1/km^{2} (8.0/sq mi)
  - Change (10 years): ▼ −11%
- Demonym: Elsfjord-folk

Official language
  - Norwegian form: Bokmål
- Time zone: UTC+01:00 (CET)
  - Summer (DST): UTC+02:00 (CEST)
- ISO 3166 code: NO-1829

Elsfjord is a former municipality in Nordland county, Norway. The 287-square-kilometre (111 sq mi) municipality existed from 1929 until its dissolution in 1962. The municipality included the area around the Elsfjorden and the valley leading up to the fjord. The area is now a part of Vefsn Municipality. The administrative centre was the village of Elsfjord.

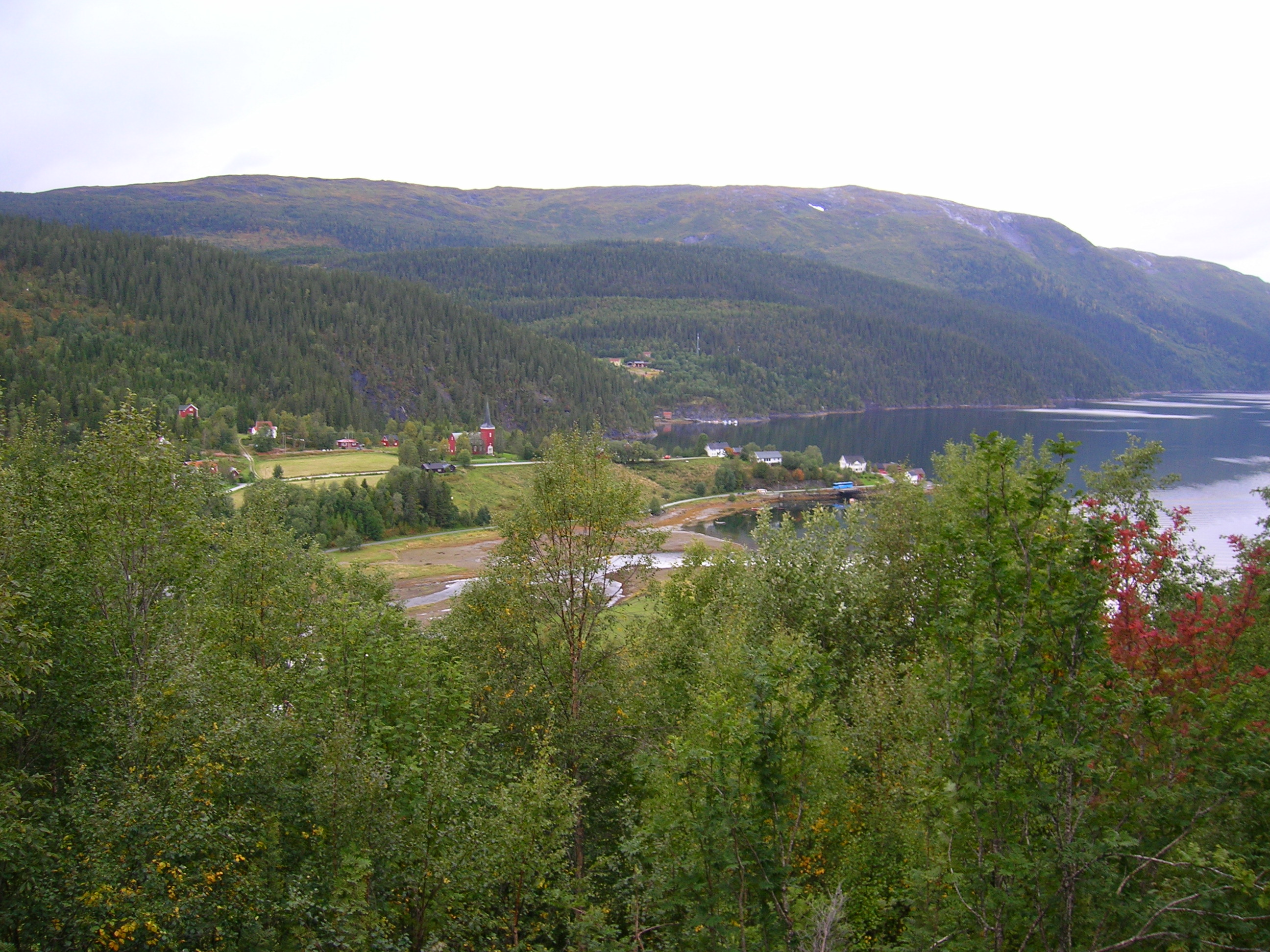
View of Elsfjord

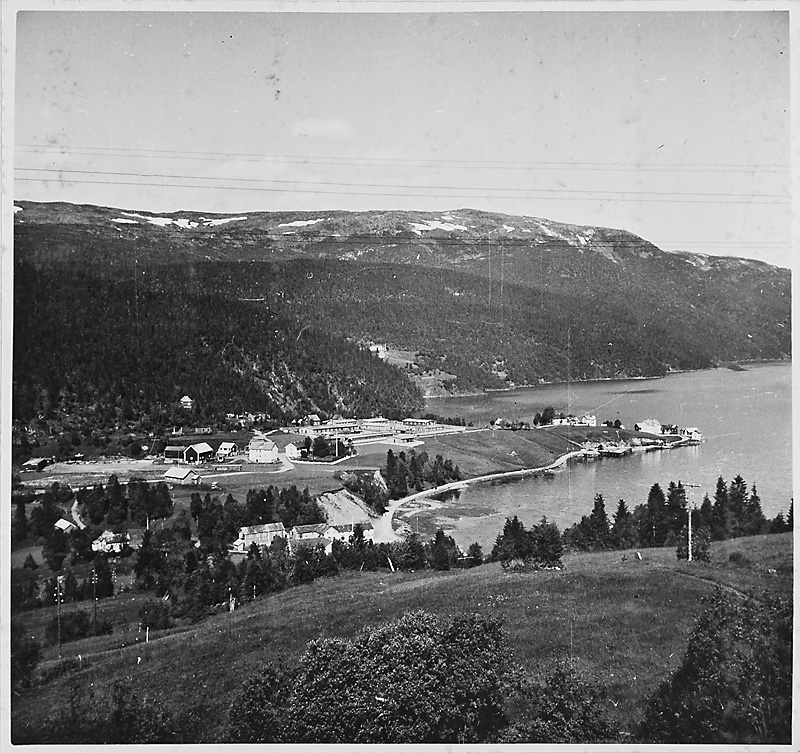
View of Elsfjord (in 1940)

Prior to its dissolution in 1962, the 287-square-kilometre (111 sq mi) municipality was the 297th largest by area out of the 731 municipalities in Norway. Elsfjord Municipality was the 659th most populous municipality in Norway with a population of about 893. The municipality's population density was 3.1 inhabitants per square kilometre (8.0/sq mi) and its population had decreased by 11% over the previous 10-year period.

== General information ==
The municipality of Elsfjord was established on 1 July 1929 when the large Hemnes Municipality was divided into three separate municipalities: Elsfjord Municipality (population: 765), Hemnes Municipality (population: 1,077), and Sør-Rana Municipality (population: 1,708). During the 1960s, there were many municipal mergers across Norway due to the work of the Schei Committee. On 1 January 1962, Elsfjord Municipality (population: 920) was merged with the neighboring Drevja Municipality (population: 1,001), Vefsn Municipality (population: 5,358), and with the town of Mosjøen) to form a new, larger Vefsn Municipality.

=== Name ===
The municipality (originally the parish) is named after the Elsfjorden since the fjord is a central geographical feature of the municipality. The origin of the fjord name is uncertain, but one possibility is that it comes from the Old Norse name (Eilifsfjǫrðr. The first element of this is Eilifr which is an old male name. The last element is fjǫrðr which means "fjord".

=== Churches ===
The Church of Norway had one parish (sokn) within Elsfjord Municipality. At the time of the municipal dissolution, it was part of the Hemnes prestegjeld and the Indre Helgeland prosti (deanery) in the Diocese of Sør-Hålogaland.

Churches in Elsfjord Municipality
Parish (sokn)	Church name	Location of the church	Year built
Elsfjord	Elsfjord Church	Elsfjord	1955

== Geography ==
The highest point in the municipality was the 1,348-metre (4,423 ft) tall mountain Lukttinden on the border with Drevja Municipality.

== Government ==
While it existed, Elsfjord Municipality was responsible for primary education (through 10th grade), outpatient health services, senior citizen services, welfare and other social services, zoning, economic development, and municipal roads and utilities. The municipality was governed by a municipal council of directly elected representatives. The mayor was indirectly elected by a vote of the municipal council. The municipality was under the jurisdiction of the Hålogaland Court of Appeal.

=== Municipal council ===
The municipal council (Herredsstyre) of Elsfjord Municipality was made up of 13 representatives that were elected to four-year terms. The tables below show the current and historical composition of the council by political party.

Elsfjord herredsstyre 1959–1961
Party name (in Norwegian)	Number of representatives
Labour Party (Arbeiderpartiet)	6
Local List(s) (Lokale lister)	7
Total number of members:	13
Note: On 1 January 1964, Elsfjord Municipality became part of Vefsn Municipality.

Elsfjord herredsstyre 1955–1959
Party name (in Norwegian)	Number of representatives
Labour Party (Arbeiderpartiet)	5
Local List(s) (Lokale lister)	8
Total number of members:	13

Elsfjord herredsstyre 1951–1955
Party name (in Norwegian)	Number of representatives
Labour Party (Arbeiderpartiet)	7
Joint List(s) of Non-Socialist Parties (Borgerlige Felleslister)	4
Local List(s) (Lokale lister)	1
Total number of members:	12

Elsfjord herredsstyre 1947–1951
Party name (in Norwegian)	Number of representatives
Labour Party (Arbeiderpartiet)	6
Communist Party (Kommunistiske Parti)	1
Local List(s) (Lokale lister)	5
Total number of members:	12

Elsfjord herredsstyre 1945–1947
Party name (in Norwegian)	Number of representatives
Labour Party (Arbeiderpartiet)	5
Communist Party (Kommunistiske Parti)	1
Joint List(s) of Non-Socialist Parties (Borgerlige Felleslister)	6
Total number of members:	12

Elsfjord herredsstyre 1937–1941*
Party name (in Norwegian)	Number of representatives
Labour Party (Arbeiderpartiet)	7
Joint List(s) of Non-Socialist Parties (Borgerlige Felleslister)	2
Local List(s) (Lokale lister)	3
Total number of members:	12
Note: Due to the German occupation of Norway during World War II, no elections were held for new municipal councils until after the war ended in 1945.

=== Mayors ===
The mayor (Norwegian: ordfører) of Elsfjord Municipality was the political leader of the municipality and the chairperson of the municipal council. Here is a list of people who held this position:

- 1929–1931: Hans Jakobsen
- 1932–1934: Kristoffer Elsfjordstrand
- 1935–1937: Martin Svarttjønnli
- 1938–1940: Levi Vatshaug
- 1943–1944: P. Christian Strand
- 1948–1955: Elling Sørvig
- 1956–1959: Peder Dahlmo
- 1961–1962: Torgeir Drevvatne

== See also ==
- List of former municipalities of Norway
