= Vefsn Municipality =

Municipality in Nordland, Norway

Vefsn Municipality Vefsn kommune
- Municipality
- Vefsen herred (historic name)
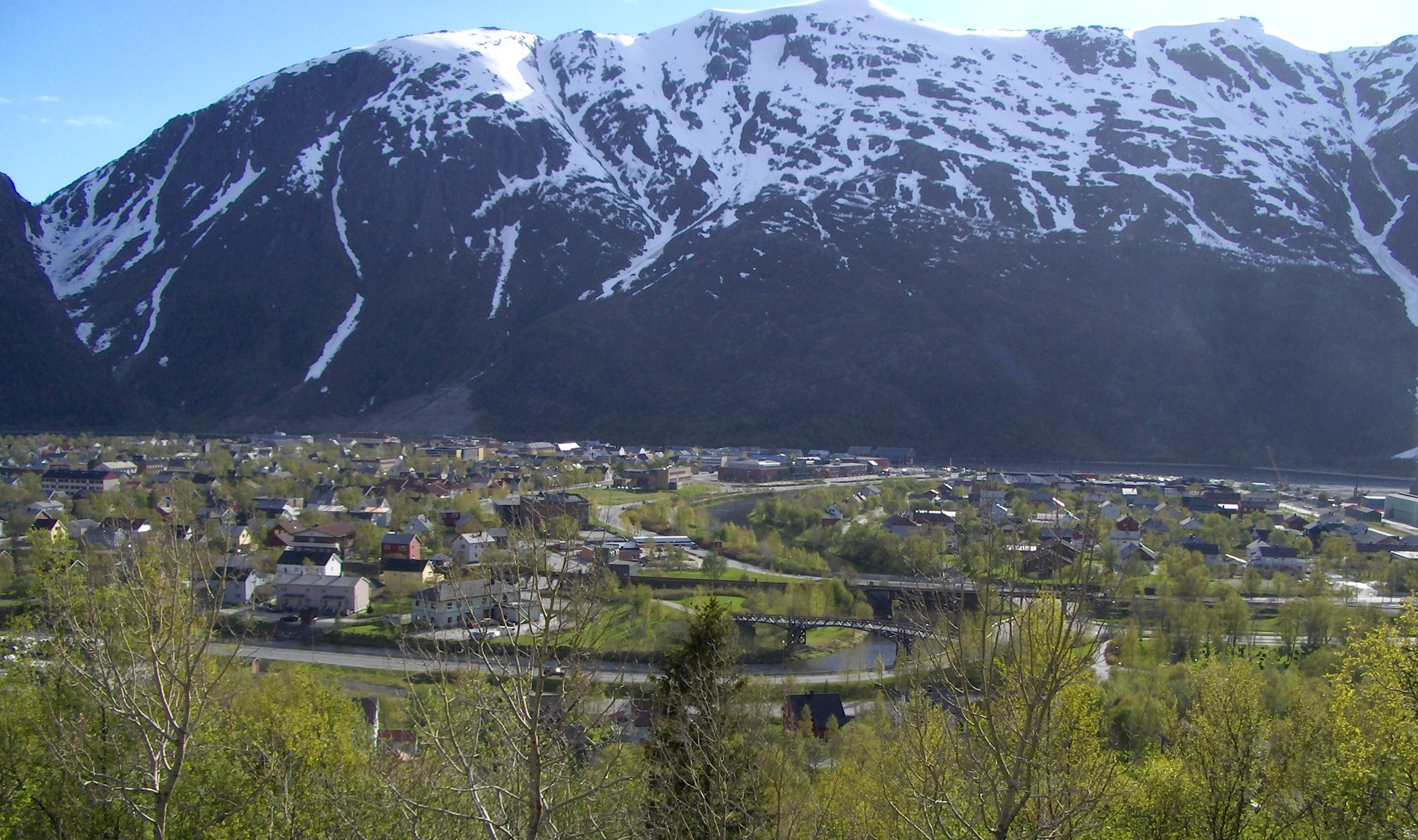

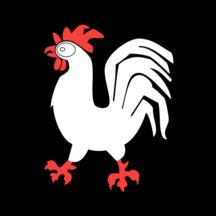
- Flag Coat of arms

- Nordland within Norway

- Vefsn within Nordland
- Coordinates: 65°47′57″N 13°15′02″E
- Country: Norway
- County: Nordland
- District: Helgeland
- Established: 1 Jan 1838
  - Created as: Formannskapsdistrikt
- Administrative centre: Mosjøen

Government
  - Mayor (2023): Rune Krutå (Ap)

Area
  - Total: 1,929.40 km^{2} (744.95 sq mi)
  - Land: 1,838.13 km^{2} (709.71 sq mi)
  - Water: 91.27 km^{2} (35.24 sq mi) 4.7%
  - Rank: #41 in Norway
- Highest elevation: 1,556.55 m (5,106.8 ft)

Population (2024)
  - Total: 13,469
  - Rank: #91 in Norway
  - Density: 7/km^{2} (18/sq mi)
  - Change (10 years): ▲ +1.4%
- Demonym: Vefsning

Official language
  - Norwegian form: Neutral
- Time zone: UTC+01:00 (CET)
  - Summer (DST): UTC+02:00 (CEST)
- ISO 3166 code: NO-1824
- Website: Official website

Vefsn (Southern Sami: Vaapste) is a municipality in Nordland county, Norway. It is part of the Helgeland traditional region. The administrative centre of the municipality is the town of Mosjøen (population: 9,843). Some of the notable villages in Vefsn include Drevvassbygda, Elsfjord, and Husvik.

The 1,929-square-kilometre (745 sq mi) municipality is the 41st largest by area out of the 357 municipalities in Norway. Vefsn Municipality is the 91st most populous municipality in Norway with a population of 13,469. The municipality's population density is 7 inhabitants per square kilometre (18/sq mi) and its population has increased by 1.4% over the previous 10-year period.

== History ==
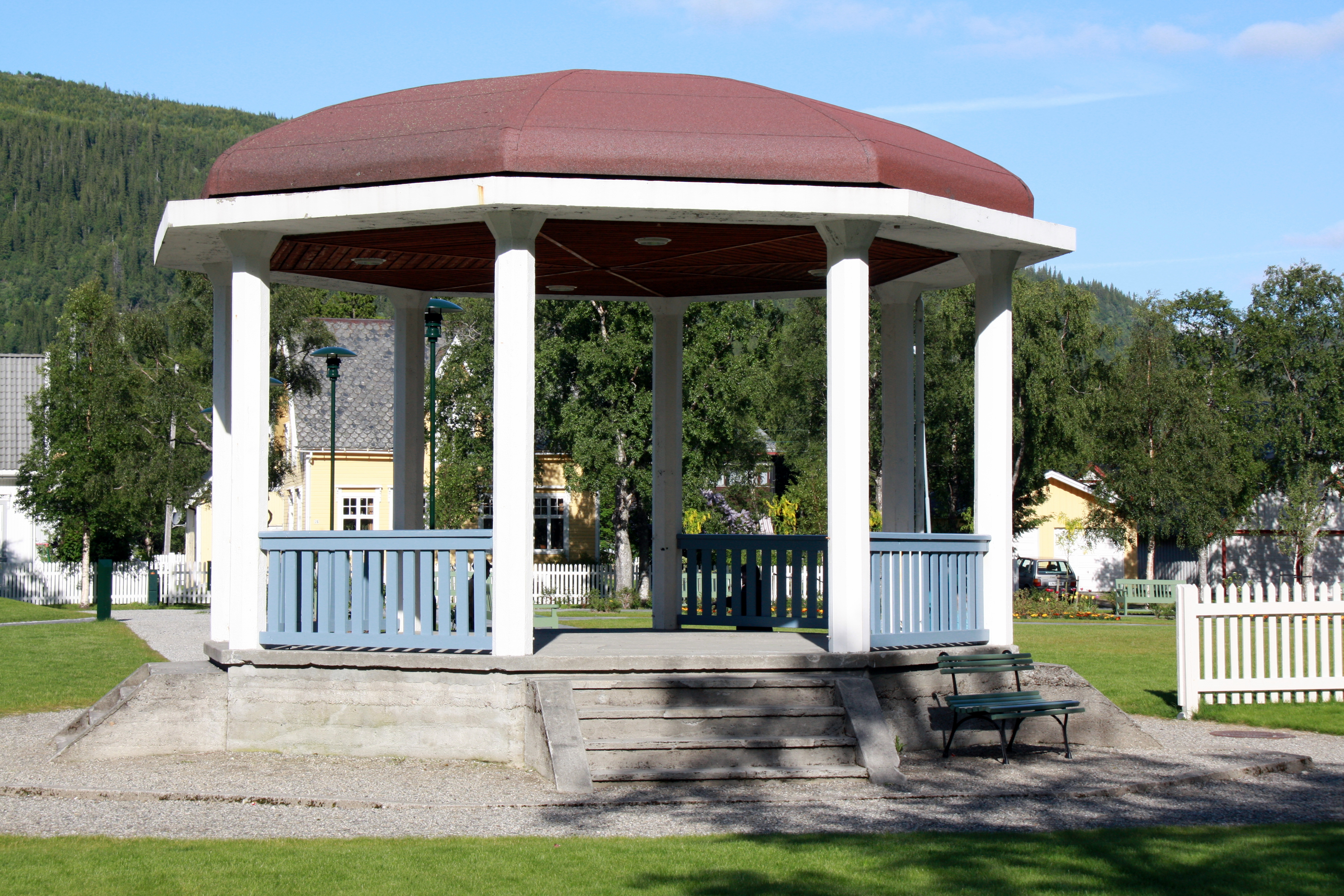
Part of the city park in Mosjøen, Vefsn municipality.

The municipality of Vefsn was established on 1 January 1838 (see formannskapsdistrikt law). In 1862, the vast eastern district (population: 921) was separated from Vefsn Municipality to become the new Hattfjelldal Municipality. This left Vefsn Municipality with 5,051 residents. In 1876, the town of Mosjøen (population: 379) was separated from Vefsn Municipality to become a separate town-municipality. This left Vefsn Municipality with 4,672 residents.

In 1927, Vefsn Municipality was split into three: the small northern district (population: 964) became the new Drevja Municipality and the large southern district (population: 1,746) became the new Grane Municipality. After the split, Vefsn Municipality had 3,119 residents remaining. In 1939, a small area of Vefsn Municipality (population: 45) was transferred to neighboring town of Mosjøen.

During the 1960s, there were many municipal mergers across Norway due to the work of the Schei Committee. On 1 January 1962, Vefsn Municipality (population: 5,358) was merged with the neighboring town of Mosjøen (population: 4,628) and the neighboring Drevja Municipality (population: 1,001) and Elsfjord Municipality (population: 920) to form a new, larger Vefsn Municipality. On 1 January 1995, the mainland areas of the neighboring Alstahaug Municipality (population: 70) were transferred to Vefsn Municipality.

=== Name ===
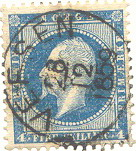
The post office was named VEFSEN in 1859.

The municipality (originally the parish) is named after the river Vefsna (Old Norse: Vefsnar) which flows through the municipality into the Vefsnfjorden (Old Norse: Vefsnir). The meaning of the river name is unknown, but it possibly comes from the old word vefja which means "to wrap" or "to wind around". Historically, the name of the municipality was spelled Vefsen. On 3 November 1917, a royal resolution changed the spelling of the name of the municipality to Vefsn.

=== Coat of arms ===
The coat of arms was granted on 13 September 1974. The official blazon is "Sable, a rooster argent armed gules" (Norwegian: På svart bunn en sølv hane). This means the arms have a black field (background) and the charge is a rooster. The rooster has a tincture of argent which means it is commonly colored white, but if it is made out of metal, then silver is used. The rooster is also armed which means its claws, beak, and comb are colored red. The rooster is a symbol for watchfulness and alertness. The arms were designed by Arthur Gustavsson.

The coat of arms was originally adopted by the municipality of Mosjøen on 25 March 1960. In 1962, Mosjøen was merged with Vefsn Municipality, Drevja Municipality, and Elsfjord Municipality to form a new, larger Vefsn Municipality. After the merger, the old arms of Mosjøen were chosen for the new municipality. Since the arms officially became obsolete after the merger, they were re-granted in 1974.

== Churches ==
The Church of Norway has three parishes (sokn) within Vefsn Municipality. It is part of the Indre Helgeland prosti (deanery) in the Diocese of Sør-Hålogaland.

Churches in Vefsn Municipality
Parish (sokn)	Church name	Location of the church	Year built
Dolstad	Dolstad Church	Mosjøen	1735
Drevja	Drevja Church	Nilsskogen	1883
Elsfjord	Elsfjord Church	Elsfjord	1955

== Government ==
Vefsn Municipality is responsible for primary education (through 10th grade), outpatient health services, senior citizen services, welfare and other social services, zoning, economic development, and municipal roads and utilities. The municipality is governed by a municipal council of directly elected representatives. The mayor is indirectly elected by a vote of the municipal council. The municipality is under the jurisdiction of the Helgeland District Court and the Hålogaland Court of Appeal.

=== Municipal council ===
The municipal council (Kommunestyre) of Vefsn Municipality is made up of 29 representatives that are elected to four year terms. The tables below show the current and historical composition of the council by political party.

Vefsn kommunestyre 2023–2027
Party name (in Norwegian)	Number of representatives
Labour Party (Arbeiderpartiet)	9
Progress Party (Fremskrittspartiet)	5
Conservative Party (Høyre)	8
Red Party (Rødt)	2
Centre Party (Senterpartiet)	3
Socialist Left Party (Sosialistisk Venstreparti)	1
Vefsn Cross-Politics Party (Vefsn tverrpolitiske parti)	1
Total number of members:	29

Vefsn kommunestyre 2019–2023
Party name (in Norwegian)	Number of representatives
Labour Party (Arbeiderpartiet)	8
Progress Party (Fremskrittspartiet)	2
Conservative Party (Høyre)	3
Red Party (Rødt)	3
Centre Party (Senterpartiet)	10
Socialist Left Party (Sosialistisk Venstreparti)	2
Vefsn Cross-Politics Party (Vefsn tverrpolitiske parti)	1
Total number of members:	29

Vefsn kommunestyre 2015–2019
Party name (in Norwegian)	Number of representatives
Labour Party (Arbeiderpartiet)	10
Progress Party (Fremskrittspartiet)	2
Conservative Party (Høyre)	5
Red Party (Rødt)	4
Centre Party (Senterpartiet)	2
Socialist Left Party (Sosialistisk Venstreparti)	1
Liberal Party (Venstre)	2
Vefsn Cross-Politics Party (Vefsn tverrpolitiske parti)	3
Total number of members:	29

Vefsn kommunestyre 2011–2015
Party name (in Norwegian)	Number of representatives
Labour Party (Arbeiderpartiet)	15
Progress Party (Fremskrittspartiet)	6
Conservative Party (Høyre)	4
Christian Democratic Party (Kristelig Folkeparti)	1
Red Party (Rødt)	3
Centre Party (Senterpartiet)	3
Socialist Left Party (Sosialistisk Venstreparti)	1
Liberal Party (Venstre)	2
Total number of members:	35

Vefsn kommunestyre 2007–2011
Party name (in Norwegian)	Number of representatives
Labour Party (Arbeiderpartiet)	16
Progress Party (Fremskrittspartiet)	6
Conservative Party (Høyre)	2
Christian Democratic Party (Kristelig Folkeparti)	1
Red Electoral Alliance (Rød Valgallianse)	3
Centre Party (Senterpartiet)	3
Socialist Left Party (Sosialistisk Venstreparti)	3
Liberal Party (Venstre)	1
Total number of members:	35

Vefsn kommunestyre 2003–2007
Party name (in Norwegian)	Number of representatives
Labour Party (Arbeiderpartiet)	15
Progress Party (Fremskrittspartiet)	6
Conservative Party (Høyre)	2
Christian Democratic Party (Kristelig Folkeparti)	1
Red Electoral Alliance (Rød Valgallianse)	2
Centre Party (Senterpartiet)	3
Socialist Left Party (Sosialistisk Venstreparti)	5
Liberal Party (Venstre)	1
Total number of members:	35

Vefsn kommunestyre 1999–2003
Party name (in Norwegian)	Number of representatives
Labour Party (Arbeiderpartiet)	14
Progress Party (Fremskrittspartiet)	4
Conservative Party (Høyre)	5
Christian Democratic Party (Kristelig Folkeparti)	2
Red Electoral Alliance (Rød Valgallianse)	1
Centre Party (Senterpartiet)	4
Socialist Left Party (Sosialistisk Venstreparti)	4
Liberal Party (Venstre)	1
Total number of members:	35

Vefsn kommunestyre 1995–1999
Party name (in Norwegian)	Number of representatives
Labour Party (Arbeiderpartiet)	17
Progress Party (Fremskrittspartiet)	2
Conservative Party (Høyre)	4
Christian Democratic Party (Kristelig Folkeparti)	2
Centre Party (Senterpartiet)	5
Socialist Left Party (Sosialistisk Venstreparti)	3
Liberal Party (Venstre)	2
Total number of members:	35

Vefsn kommunestyre 1991–1995
Party name (in Norwegian)	Number of representatives
Labour Party (Arbeiderpartiet)	16
Conservative Party (Høyre)	5
Christian Democratic Party (Kristelig Folkeparti)	1
Centre Party (Senterpartiet)	4
Socialist Left Party (Sosialistisk Venstreparti)	8
Liberal Party (Venstre)	1
Total number of members:	35

Vefsn kommunestyre 1987–1991
Party name (in Norwegian)	Number of representatives
Labour Party (Arbeiderpartiet)	32
Conservative Party (Høyre)	9
Christian Democratic Party (Kristelig Folkeparti)	2
Centre Party (Senterpartiet)	4
Socialist Left Party (Sosialistisk Venstreparti)	4
Liberal Party (Venstre)	2
Total number of members:	53

Vefsn kommunestyre 1983–1987
Party name (in Norwegian)	Number of representatives
Labour Party (Arbeiderpartiet)	32
Christian Democratic Party (Kristelig Folkeparti)	5
Centre Party (Senterpartiet)	9
Socialist Left Party (Sosialistisk Venstreparti)	4
Liberal Party (Venstre)	3
Total number of members:	53

Vefsn kommunestyre 1979–1983
Party name (in Norwegian)	Number of representatives
Labour Party (Arbeiderpartiet)	27
Conservative Party (Høyre)	12
Christian Democratic Party (Kristelig Folkeparti)	3
Red Electoral Alliance (Rød Valgallianse)	1
Centre Party (Senterpartiet)	6
Liberal Party (Venstre)	4
Total number of members:	53

Vefsn kommunestyre 1975–1979
Party name (in Norwegian)	Number of representatives
Labour Party (Arbeiderpartiet)	27
Conservative Party (Høyre)	6
Christian Democratic Party (Kristelig Folkeparti)	4
Centre Party (Senterpartiet)	9
Socialist Left Party (Sosialistisk Venstreparti)	4
Liberal Party (Venstre)	3
Total number of members:	53

Vefsn kommunestyre 1971–1975
Party name (in Norwegian)	Number of representatives
Labour Party (Arbeiderpartiet)	29
Conservative Party (Høyre)	4
Christian Democratic Party (Kristelig Folkeparti)	3
Centre Party (Senterpartiet)	9
Socialist People's Party (Sosialistisk Folkeparti)	4
Liberal Party (Venstre)	4
Total number of members:	53

Vefsn kommunestyre 1967–1971
Party name (in Norwegian)	Number of representatives
Labour Party (Arbeiderpartiet)	27
Conservative Party (Høyre)	5
Christian Democratic Party (Kristelig Folkeparti)	2
Centre Party (Senterpartiet)	8
Socialist People's Party (Sosialistisk Folkeparti)	5
Liberal Party (Venstre)	6
Total number of members:	53

Vefsn kommunestyre 1963–1967
Party name (in Norwegian)	Number of representatives
Labour Party (Arbeiderpartiet)	29
Conservative Party (Høyre)	6
Christian Democratic Party (Kristelig Folkeparti)	2
Centre Party (Senterpartiet)	8
Socialist People's Party (Sosialistisk Folkeparti)	2
Liberal Party (Venstre)	6
Total number of members:	53

Vefsn herredsstyre 1959–1963
Party name (in Norwegian)	Number of representatives
Labour Party (Arbeiderpartiet)	13
Conservative Party (Høyre)	1
Centre Party (Senterpartiet)	7
Liberal Party (Venstre)	1
Local List(s) (Lokale lister)	1
Total number of members:	23

Vefsn herredsstyre 1955–1959
Party name (in Norwegian)	Number of representatives
Labour Party (Arbeiderpartiet)	13
Farmers' Party (Bondepartiet)	7
Liberal Party (Venstre)	2
Local List(s) (Lokale lister)	1
Total number of members:	23

Vefsn herredsstyre 1951–1955
Party name (in Norwegian)	Number of representatives
Labour Party (Arbeiderpartiet)	13
Farmers' Party (Bondepartiet)	5
Liberal Party (Venstre)	2
Total number of members:	20

Vefsn herredsstyre 1947–1951
Party name (in Norwegian)	Number of representatives
Labour Party (Arbeiderpartiet)	12
Communist Party (Kommunistiske Parti)	1
Farmers' Party (Bondepartiet)	6
Liberal Party (Venstre)	1
Total number of members:	20

Vefsn herredsstyre 1945–1947
Party name (in Norwegian)	Number of representatives
Labour Party (Arbeiderpartiet)	12
Farmers' Party (Bondepartiet)	6
Liberal Party (Venstre)	2
Total number of members:	20

Vefsn herredsstyre 1937–1941*
Party name (in Norwegian)	Number of representatives
Labour Party (Arbeiderpartiet)	12
Communist Party (Kommunistiske Parti)	7
Farmers' Party (Bondepartiet)	1
Total number of members:	20
Note: Due to the German occupation of Norway during World War II, no elections were held for new municipal councils until after the war ended in 1945.

=== Mayors ===
The mayor (Norwegian: ordfører) of Vefsn Municipality is the political leader of the municipality and the chairperson of the municipal council. Here is a list of people who have held this position:

- 1838–1842: Christian Quale
- 1842–1844: Kristoffer Ingebrigtsen
- 1844–1862: Ola Olsson
- 1863–1864: Peter Holst
- 1865–1866: Ola Olsson
- 1867–1870: Anders Persson
- 1871–1876: John Ottesen
- 1877–1878: Even Sund
- 1889–1894: Peter Holst
- 1895–1896: Nils M. Kulstad
- 1897–1898: Even Sund
- 1899–1901: Per Flaa (LL)
- 1902–1904: Nils Kulstad (V)
- 1905–1905: Christian Møinichen Havig (V)
- 1905–1905: Per Flaa (LL)
- 1905–1913: Ole Klemmentsen (V)
- 1914–1916: Mikkel Alsgaard (V)
- 1917–1918: Nils Skandfer
- 1919–1920: Sølfest Hagen
- 1920–1925: Nils Mjaavatn
- 1926–1928: Anders Svare (V)
- 1929–1940: Per M. Stordal (Ap)
- 1943–1945: Anders Svare
- 1946–1946: Kåre Vangen
- 1946–1947: Arne Aalbotsjord (Ap)
- 1948–1954: Anders Granås
- 1954–1955: Arne Aalbotsjord (Ap)
- 1956–1959: Kåre Vangen
- 1960–1961: Arne Aalbotsjord (Ap)
- 1962–1966: Einar Jensen (Ap)
- 1966–1975: Arne Aalbotsjord (Ap)
- 1976–1979: Eugen Almås (Ap)
- 1980–1989: Peder Hyttebakk (Ap)
- 1990–1993: Roy Skogsholm (Ap)
- 1993–1998: Knut Petter Torgersen (Ap)
- 1998–2000: Britt Jonassen (Ap)
- 2000–2019: Jann-Arne Løvdahl (Ap)
- 2019–2023: Berit Hundåla (Sp)
- 2023–present: Rune Krutå (Ap)

== Geography ==
The administrative centre of Vefsn is the town of Mosjøen which is situated along the innermost part of the Vefsnfjorden. Outside Mosjøen, the large municipality of Vefsn is dominated by spruce forests, mountains, lakes, agriculture, and the Vefsna river. The municipality is served by Mosjøen Airport, Kjærstad.

The highest point in the municipality is the 1,556.55-metre (5,106.8 ft) tall mountain Geittinden. The mountain Lukttinden is located in the northern part of the municipality. There are many large lakes in Vefsn including Drevvatnet, Finnknevatnet, Fustvatnet, Hundålvatnet, Luktvatnet, Mjåvatnet, and Ømmervatnet. The Lomsdal–Visten National Park is partially located in Vefsn.

=== Birdlife ===
Vefsn has several habitats and birding areas, including coniferous woodlands both inland and along the coast. The Skjørlegda nature reserve protects coniferous forest covering the Eiterå valley, which extends inland to higher mountain habitat.

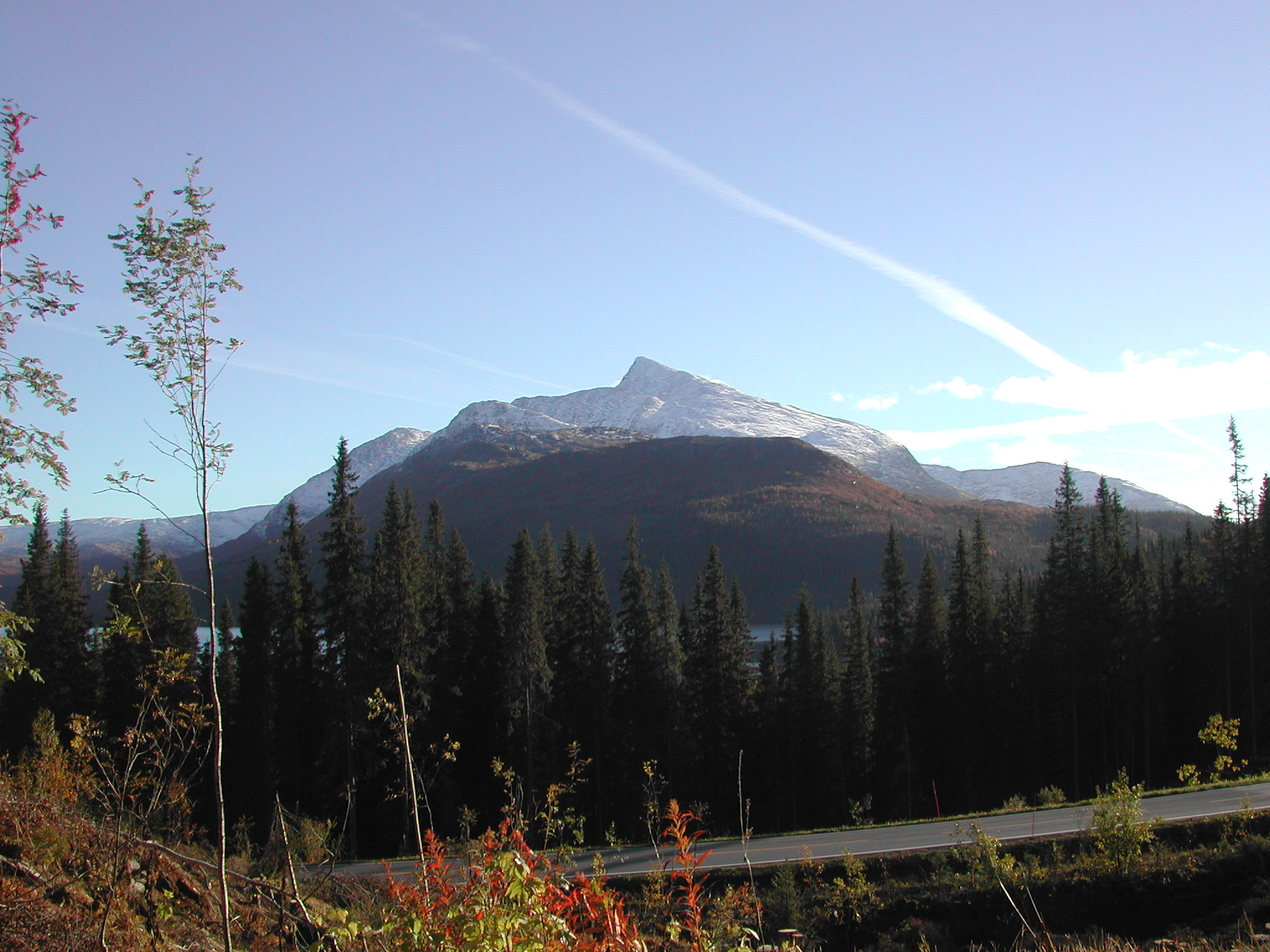
Luktinden (mountain) in autumn

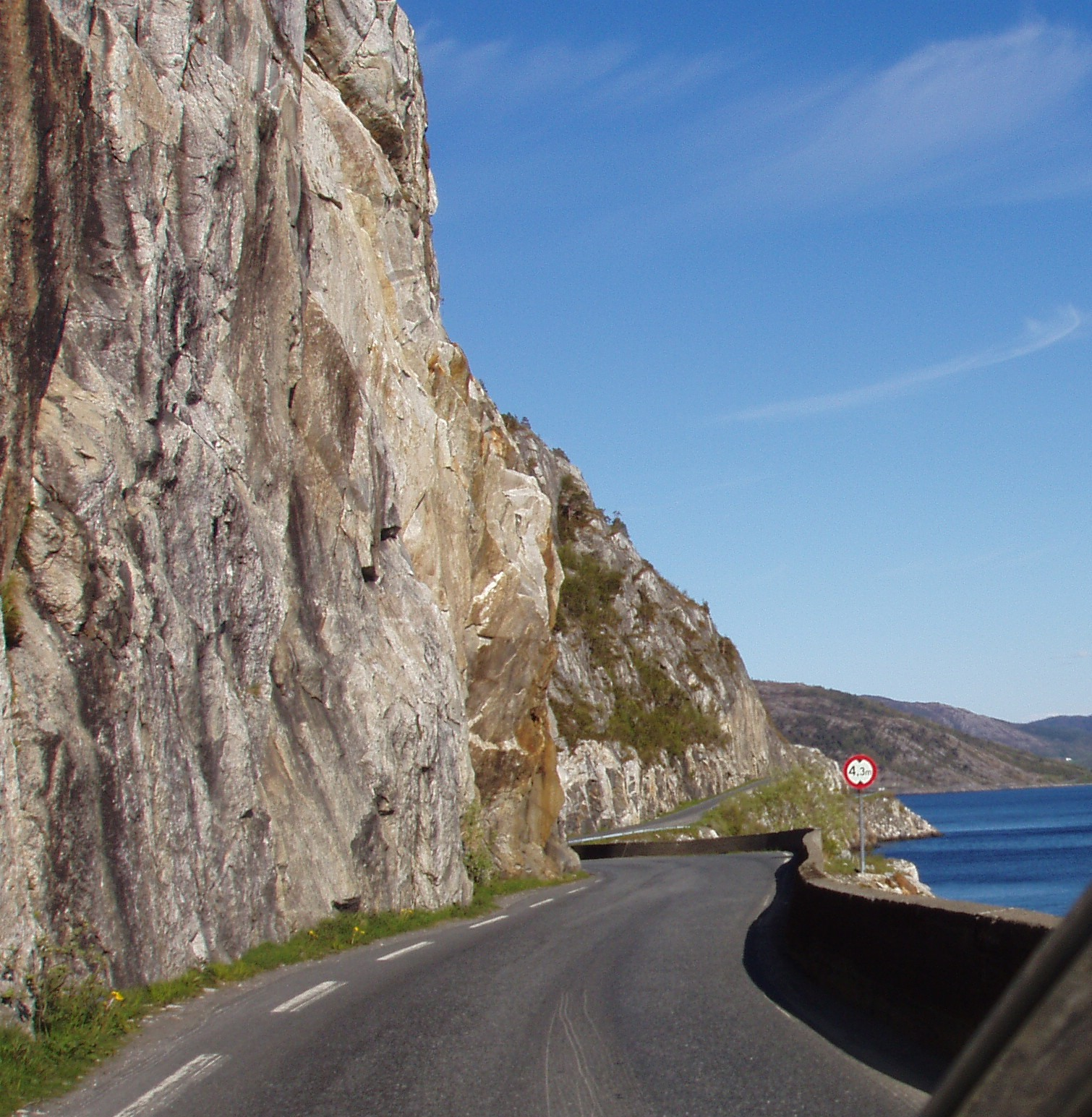
The road along Vefsnfjord

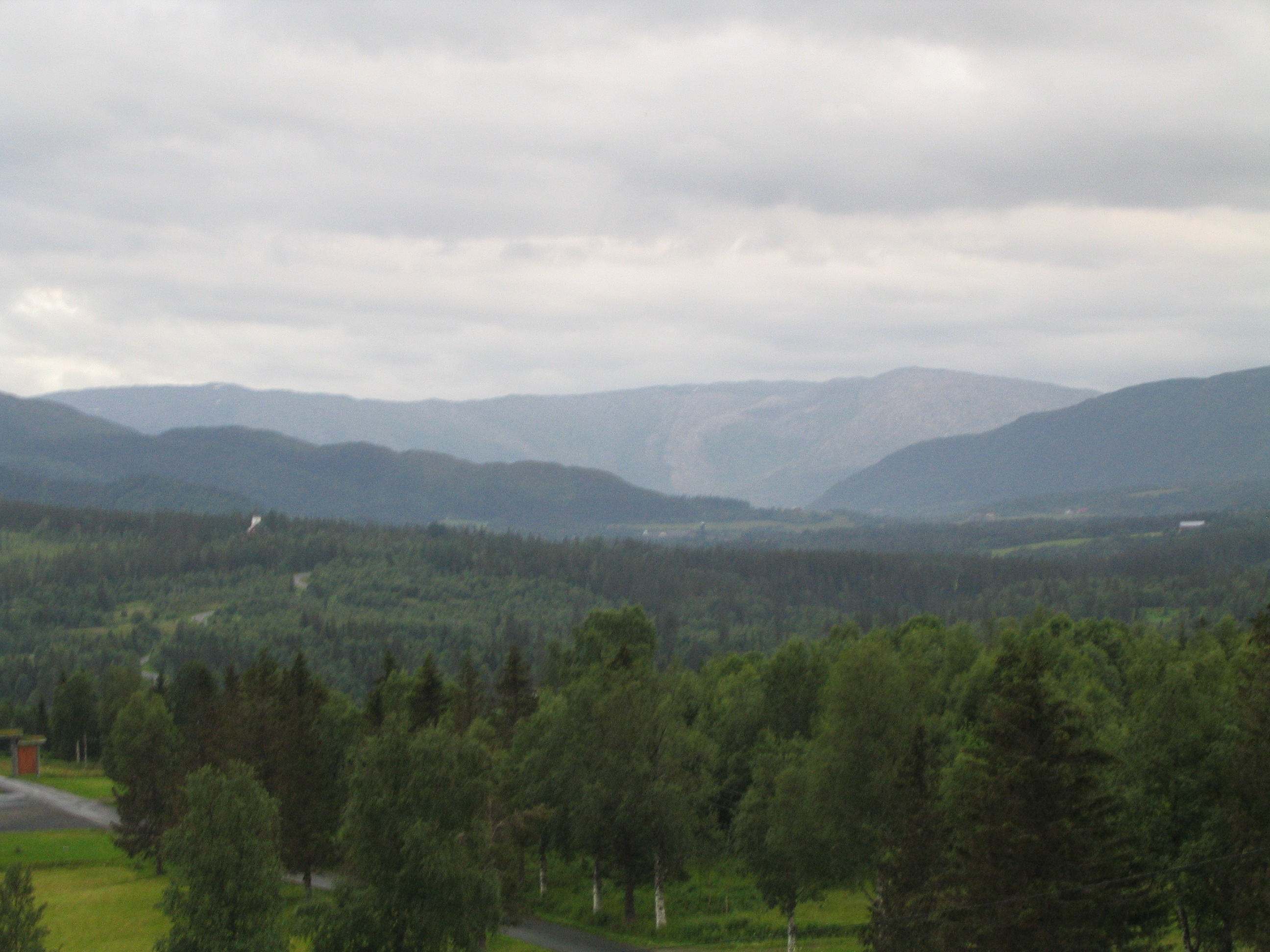
Drevje valley (Drevjedalen), Vefsn

=== Farms of Vefsn ===
Historically, the land of Vefsn was divided up into named farms. These farms were used in census and tax records and are useful for genealogical research.

==== Farm maps ====
Note that each map has a maximum number of listings it can display, so the map has been divided into parts consistent with the enumeration districts (Norwegian: tellingskrets) in the 1920 census. This map will include one farm name per farm number; other farm names or subdivision numbers may exist.

The municipalities of Mosjøen, Elsfjord, and Drevja were incorporated into Vefsn in 1962, and are not included in these maps. Tellingskrets 5, Granli; 6 Øvre Svenningdal, and 7 Austervefsen og Feplingdal, are now part of other municipalities, primarily Grane.

Vefsn municipality, tellingskrets 1-4, 8, 10 from 1920 census
Tellingskrets (enumeration districts): 1, Hunnaala (lime); 2, Vikdalen (black); 3, Nes og Mo Skolekrinsar (blue); 4, Forsjord (purple); 8, Bjørnådalen (green); 10, Hals (red). List of farms:
1 1: Juvik
2 2: Grønvik
3 3: Søttaren
4 4: Øien
5 5: Vundals-Keiven
6 6: Sørgården
7 7: Hunnåla
8 8: Høyneset
9 9: Digermulo
10 10: Dimmeldal
11 11: Hundaalvatn
12 14: Vikdalen
13 15: Øyen
14 17: Tverå
15 18: Kjærstad
16 19: Rosvoll
17 20: Auflis
18 21: Griva
19 101: Skog Øvre
20 102: Skog Nedre
21 103: Olderskog
22 22: Kralfars
23 23: Farsjord
24 24: Øksendal
25 25: Steinlid
26 26: Eitraalid
27 27: Paaljord
28 29: Granheim
29 33: Ravnaa
30 93: Ravatås
31 94: Fokstad
32 95: Alsgård
33 96: Bjørnå øvre
34 97: Bjørnåli
35 98: Grannes
36 99: Bjørnå nedre
37 104: Dolstad
38 105: Halsøy
39 117: Kulstasjøen
40 118: Rynes
41 119: Aaremmen
42 120: Hauberg
Vefsn municipality, tellingskrets 9, 11
Tellingskrets (enumeration districts): 9, Austerbygden og Marka (teal); 11, Helfjell og Herringen (blue). List of farms:
1 86: Sjåmo
2 87: Kjønåsen
3 88: Kjemsås
4 89: Tuven
5 90: Reinfjell
6 91: Nordås
7 92: Langvatnet
8 93: Otervær
9 103: Froststad
10 105: Halsskogen
11 106: Andås
12 107: Lundestad
13 108: Hagfors
14 109: Moldremma
15 110: Heimigarden
16 111: Gamarken
17 112: Røsdal
18 113: Honggard
19 114: Jakobgard
20 115: Bortigard
21 116: Aabotsjord
28 84: Herringbotnet
29 85: Kalvmones
30 122: Forsmo
31 123: Jomfrurem
32 124: Gløsen
33 125: Brubakken
34 126: Bjørknes
35 127: Risnes
36 128: Oseng
37 129: Aanes
38 130: Høgrem
39 131: Heimstad
40 133: Nilsmo
41 134: Almdal
42 135: Sæteren
43 136: Hallingard
44 137: Stigen
45 145: Labakken
46 146: Langmo
47 147: Langmo ytre
48 148: Engås
49 149: Rokås
50 151: Utgården
51 152: Helfjellhaug
52 153: Opgård
53 154: Gulljord
54 155: Høglid
55 Dolstad kirke (church), built 1735
Vefsn municipality, tellingskrets 12-15
Tellingskrets (enumeration districts): 12, Ømmervatnet og Fustvatnet (lime); 13, Øvre Drevjen (red); 14, Ner Drevjen (blue); 15, Skaland (green). List of farms:
1 138: Brekken
2 139: Smedseng
3 140: Lynghaug
4 141: Nerhaug
5 142: Sletten
6 143: Storvik
7 144: Aspnes
8 156: Grøftrem
9 157: Skjetvik
10 158: Sovarneset
11 159: Goffahaug
12 160: Mjaavatnet
13 161: Straumen
14 162: Tuvneset
15 163: Uren
16 164: Kækvik
17 165: Nævervei
18 166: Hatten
19 167: Angermo
20 168: Stordal
21 169: Bjørkrem
22 170: Sandbugt
23 171: Toftneset
24 172: Ømmervatsbukt
25 173: Perjord
26 174: Blaafjell
27 175: Dalmo
28 176: Steinhaug
29 177: Jonseng
30 178: Rognryggmo
31 179: Vatshøve
32 180: Enge
33 181: Gullmo
34 182: Bratlid
35 183: Kummernes
36 184: Kummermo
37 185: Nilsskog
38 186: Trømoen
39 187: Almaasen
40 188: Lamoen
41 189: Granmoen
42 190: Myren
43 191: Forsmoen
44 192: Bratbakken
45 193: Bergsmo
46 194: Nyland
47 195: Stuvland
48 196: Jonsrud
49 197: Utnes
50 198: Nermoen
51 199: Lindseth
52 200: Søfting
53 201: Skaland
54 121: Veseth
55 Drevja kirke (church), built 1883

==== Names and numbers ====
Following are the farms in the Vefsn Municipality, as they are listed in O. Rygh's series Norske_Gaardnavne (lit. 'Norwegian farm names'), the Nordland volume of which was published in 1905.

See also: Digital version of Norske Gaardnavne - Nordland (in Norwegian)

The farm numbers are used in some census records, and numbers that are near each other indicate that those farms are geographically proximate. Handwritten Norwegian sources, particularly those prior to 1800, may use variants on these names. For recorded variants before 1723, see the digital version of O. Rygh. Note that the 1920 census records mapped above may not match O. Rygh.

Farm names were often used as part of Norwegian names, in addition to the person's given name and patronymic or inherited surname. Some families retained the farm name, or toponymic, as a surname when they emigrated, so in those cases tracing a surname may tell you specifically where in Norway the family was from. This tradition began to change in the mid to late 19th century, and inherited surnames were codified into law in 1923.

Farm Name	Farm Number
Juviken	1
Grønviken	2
Søttaren	3
Øren	4
Kleven	5
Sørgaarden	6, 1
Hundaala, 1	6, 7
Hundaala, 2	7
Høinesdalen	8
Digermulen	9
Demmeldalen	10
Hundaalvatnet	11
Bjørnvolden	12
Sørvasdale	13
Vikdalen	14
Øien	15
Rotneset	15, 5
Kvandalen	16
Tveraaen	17
Kjærstad	18
Helvik	18, 2
Rosvold	19
Aufles	20
Grøva	21
Kvalfors	22
Forsjorden	23
Øksendalen	24
Steinlien	25
Eiteraaen øvre	26
Eiteraaen nedre	27
Eiteraaen vestre	28
Eiteraaholmen	29
Tverelvmoen	30
Skjørlægden	31
Eiteraafjeldet	32
Ravnaaen	33
Turmoen	34
Faldmoen	35
Spelremmen	36
Laksfors, 1	37
Laksfors, 2	38
Laksforshoved	39
Spelen	40
Valryggen	41
Finsaasen	42
Glugvaselven	43
Haustreisdalen, 1	44
Haustreisdalen, 2	45
Nygaarden	46
Glugvatnet	47
Grane	48
Almdalen	49
Svenningdalen nedre	50
Baafjeldmoen	51
Stavasdalen	52
Baafjelddalen	53
Svenningdalen øvre	54
Hjortskarmoen, 1	55
Kapskarmoen	56
Hjortskarmoen, 2	57
Holmvasdalen	58
Bjørkaasen	59
Kjerringvatnet	60
Kapfjeldlien	61
Storkjønlien	62
Tomasvatnet	63
Bjorkjønlien	64
Kvanlien	65
Tøimskarlien	66
Bustadmoen	67
Simskaret	68
Fiplingkroken	69
Fiplingdalen, 1	70
Fiplingdalen, 2	71
Forshaugen	72
Jerpaasen	73
Hallingen	74
Fagerlien	75
Klovimoen	76
Bjorbækmoen	77
Stillelvaasen	78
Svartvatnet	79
Stabforsmoen	80
Stormoen	81
Baafjeldmoen østre	82
Fjeldbækmoen	83
Herringbotnet	84
Lien	84, 1
Nergaarden	84, 2
Kalvmoen	85
Skjaamoen	86
Kjønnaasen	87
Kjemsaasen	88
Killeraasen	89
Reinfjeldet	90
Lian	90, 1
Nordaasen	91
Klubben	91, 3
Langvatnet	92
Aasen	93
Ravatnet	94
Ravasbakken	94, 1
Fokstad	94, 3
Nordstad	94, 4
Alsgaarden	95
Bjørnaaen øvre	96
Einremmen	96, 3
Bjørnaalien	97
Skogsaasen	98
Bjørnaaen nedre	99
Mosaasen	100
Skog, 1	101
Kringleøren	101, 2
Øvstenget	101, 6
Skog, 2	102
Mo	103
Husbrekken	103, 2
Myrbakken	103, 3
Nyrud	103, 5
Dolstad	104
Hals	105
Halsøen	105, 2
Andaas	106
Remmen	107
Hagfors	108
Moldremmen	109
Marken øvre	110
Gamarken	111
Røsdalen	112
Midtmarken indre	113
Midtmarken ytre	114
Jakobgaardshaugen	114, 2
Marken nedre	115
Aalbosjorden	116
Fjeldstad	116, 2
Kulstad	117
Aasen	117, 1
Baathølen	117, 2
Myren	117, 3
Dalenget	117, 4
Staurremmen	117, 8
Fustskotremmen, 1	117, 9
Trangdalen	117, 10
Fustskotremmen, 2	117, 11
Finbrauten	117, 12
Kulstadsjøen	117, 16
Rynes	118
Bøen	118, 4
Aaremmen	119
Katuglehaugen	120
Veset	121
Forsmoen indre	122
Jomfruremmen	123
Haukland	124
Gløsen	124, 3
Volden	125
Bjørknes	126
Risnes	127
Myrnes	128
Aanes	129
Svartaasen	130
Steffenremmen	131
Herring mellem	132
Nilsmoen	133
Almdalen	134
Østerherring øvre	135
Østerherring nedre	136
Stien	137
Lillesmedseng øvre	138
Lillesmedseng nedre	139
Storsmedseng	140
Lynghaugen	140, 2
Strøm	141
Jordbæksletten	142
Breivik	143
Aspnes	144
Aakviken	145
Langmoen, 1	146
Langmoen, 2	147
Engaasen	148
Rokaasen	149
Granaasen	150
Hellefjeld ytre	151
Storremmen	151, 1
Utgaarden	151, 2
Husremmen	151, 3
Hellefjeld mellem	152
Hellefjeld øvre	153
Guldmoen	154
Høglien	155
Groftremmen	156
Skjetviken	157
Sovarneset	158
Mjaavatnet, 1	159
Gofahaugen	159, 1
Mjaavatnet, 2	160
Strømsnes	161
Tuvneset	162
Troldaasuren	163
Ømmervashoved	164
Næverveien med Kaldaahaugen	165
Hatten	166
Angermoen	167
Stordalen	168
Bjørkremmen	169
Sandbugten	170
Almlien	171
Ømmervasbugten	172
Perjorden	173
Blaafjeldet	174
Blaafjelddalen	175
Steinhaugen	176
Smalboremmen	177
Rognryggen	178
Vashoved	179
Tømmermyrmoen	180
Myrmoen	181
Bratlien	182
Kummerneset	183
Kummermoen	184
Breimoen	185
Baatstrand	186
Trømoen	186, 1
Trøen	186, 2
Øigaarden	186, 3
Almaasen	187
Lamoen	188
Granmoen	189
Strøm	190
Moen	190, 1
Myren	190, 2
Nystad	190, 6
Forsmoen ytre	191
Bratbakken	192
Bergsnev	193
Nyland indre	194
Stuvland	195
Drevland	196
Utnes	197
Holand	198
Myrmoen	198, 3
Lindset	199
Fornesviken	199, 4
Søfting	200
Skaland	201
Staulan	201, 1

== Notable people ==
Notable people that were born or lived in Vefsn include:

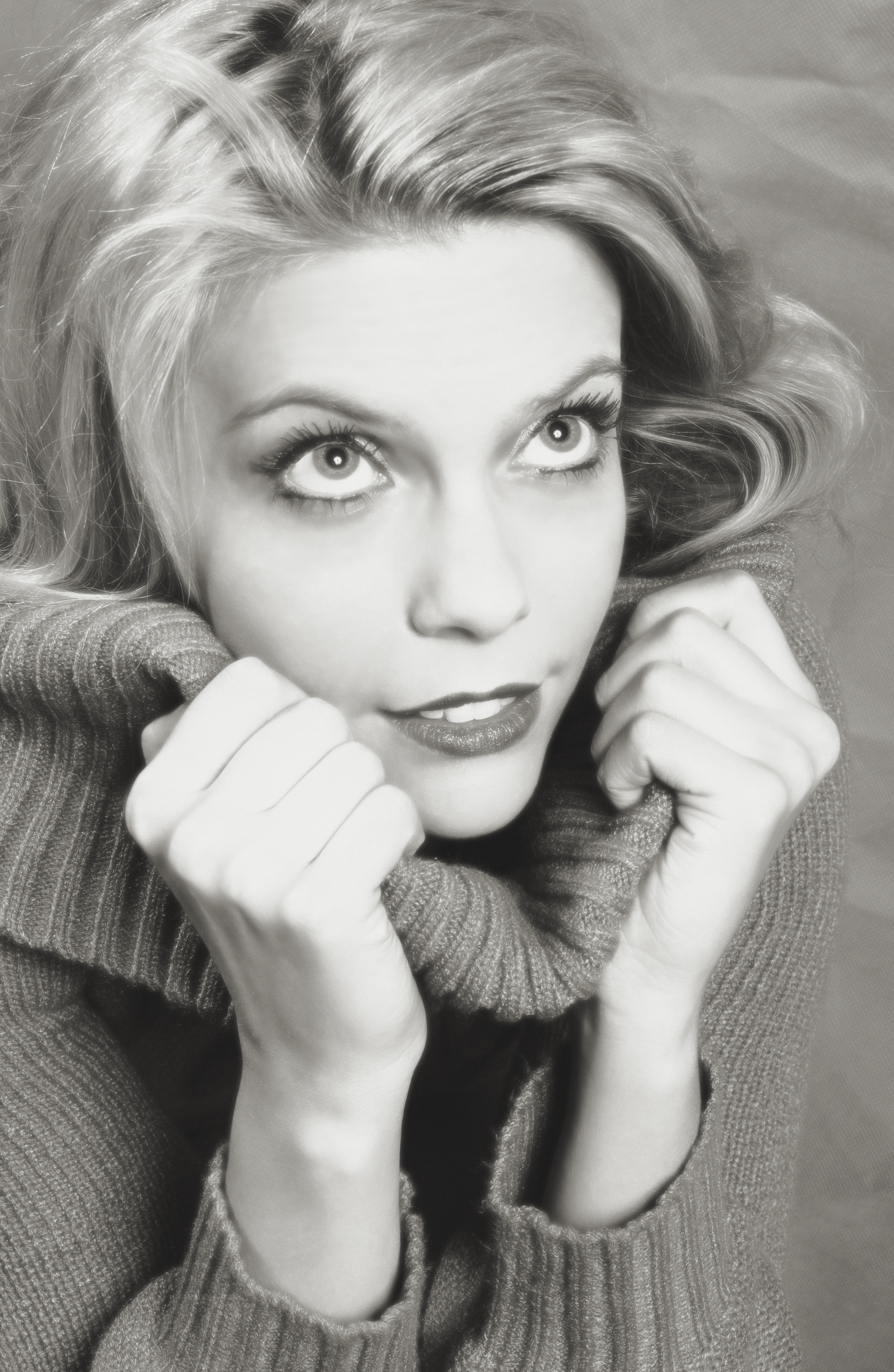
Silje Reinåmo, 2008

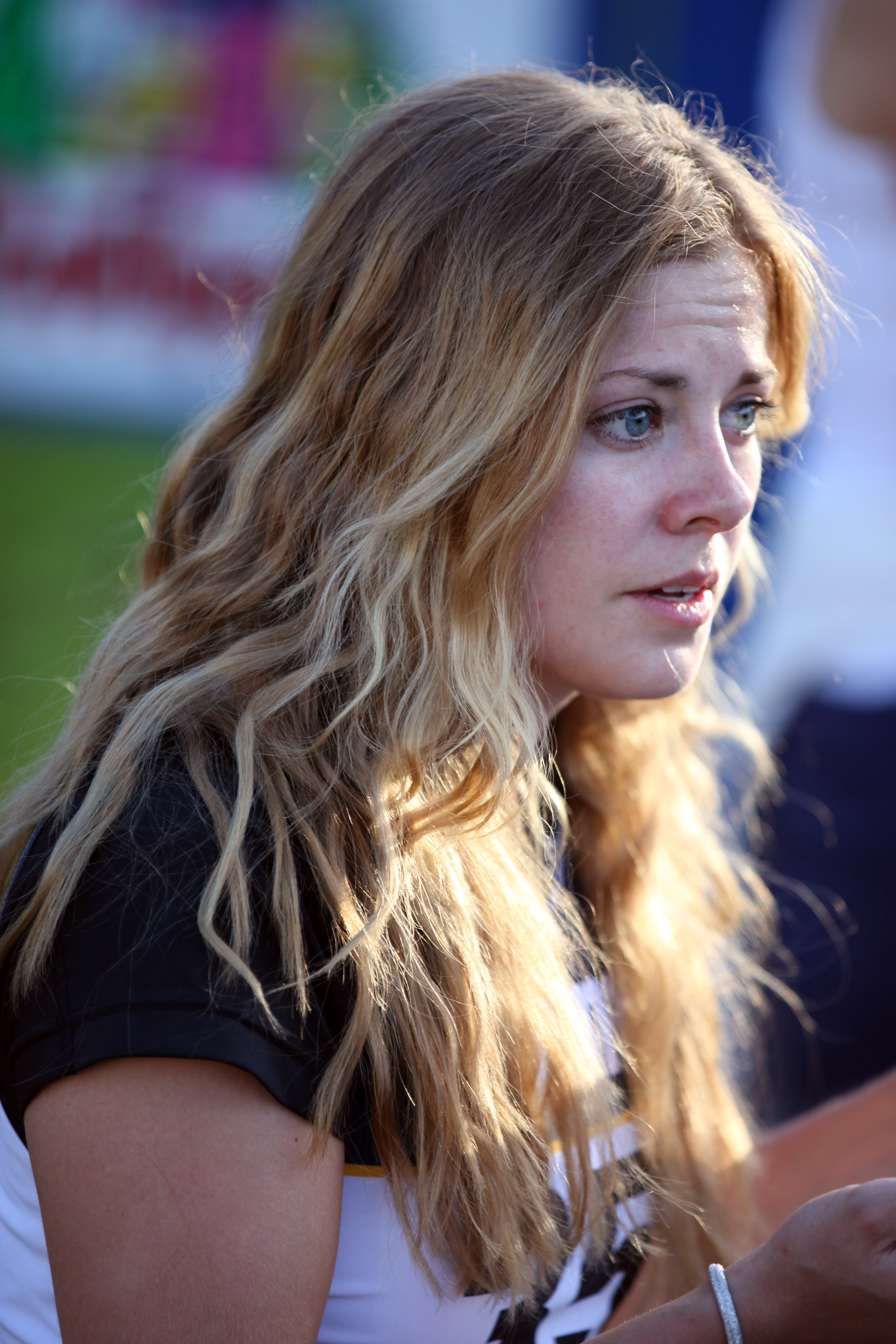
Anette Sagen, 2012

- Thorolf Holmboe (1866 in Vefsn –1935), a painter, illustrator, and designer
- Nils Mjaavatn (1883 in Vefsn – 1951), a farmer, teacher, and politician
- David Monrad Johansen (1888 in Vefsn – 1974), a composer
- Aage Grundstad (1923 in Vefsn – 2012), an award-winning accordion player
- Erling Bauck (1924 in Mosjøen – 2004), a Norwegian resistance member and writer
- Kjell Eliassen (born 1929 in Vefsn), a diplomat
- Trond Øyen (1929 in Mosjøen – 1999), a Norwegian violinist
- Baard Owe (1936 in Mosjøen – 2017), an actor, moved to Denmark in 1956
- Inga Juuso (1945 in Mosjøen – 2014), a yoiker, Sami singer and actress
- Odd Eriksen (born 1955; worked in Mosjøen), a politician also known for stopping an Algerian hijacker from crashing a Kato Air-flight in 2004.
- Frode Fjellheim (born 1959 in Mussere), a yoiker and musician on piano and synthesizer
- Finn Guttormsen (born 1968 in Mosjøen), a Jazz musician on upright bass
- Aleksander L. Nordaas (born 1982 in Mosjøen), a screenwriter and film director
- Silje Reinåmo (born 1982 in Mosjøen), an actress, dancer, and musical performer
- Sandra Lyng (born 1987 in Mosjøen), a Norwegian singer

=== Sport ===
- Johan Lind (born 1942 in Mosjøen), a speed skater who competed at the 1968 and 1972 Winter Olympics
- Bent Inge Johnsen (born 1972 in Mosjøen), a former footballer with 284 club caps and assistant manager
- Anette Sagen (born 1985 in Mosjøen), a Norwegian former ski jumper
- Thomas Drage (born 1992 in Mosjøen), a football player with over 220 club caps
- Eirin Maria Kvandal (born 2001), a Norwegian ski jumper

== See also ==
- Nazi concentration camps in Norway
