= Lukttinden =

Mountain in Nordland, Norway

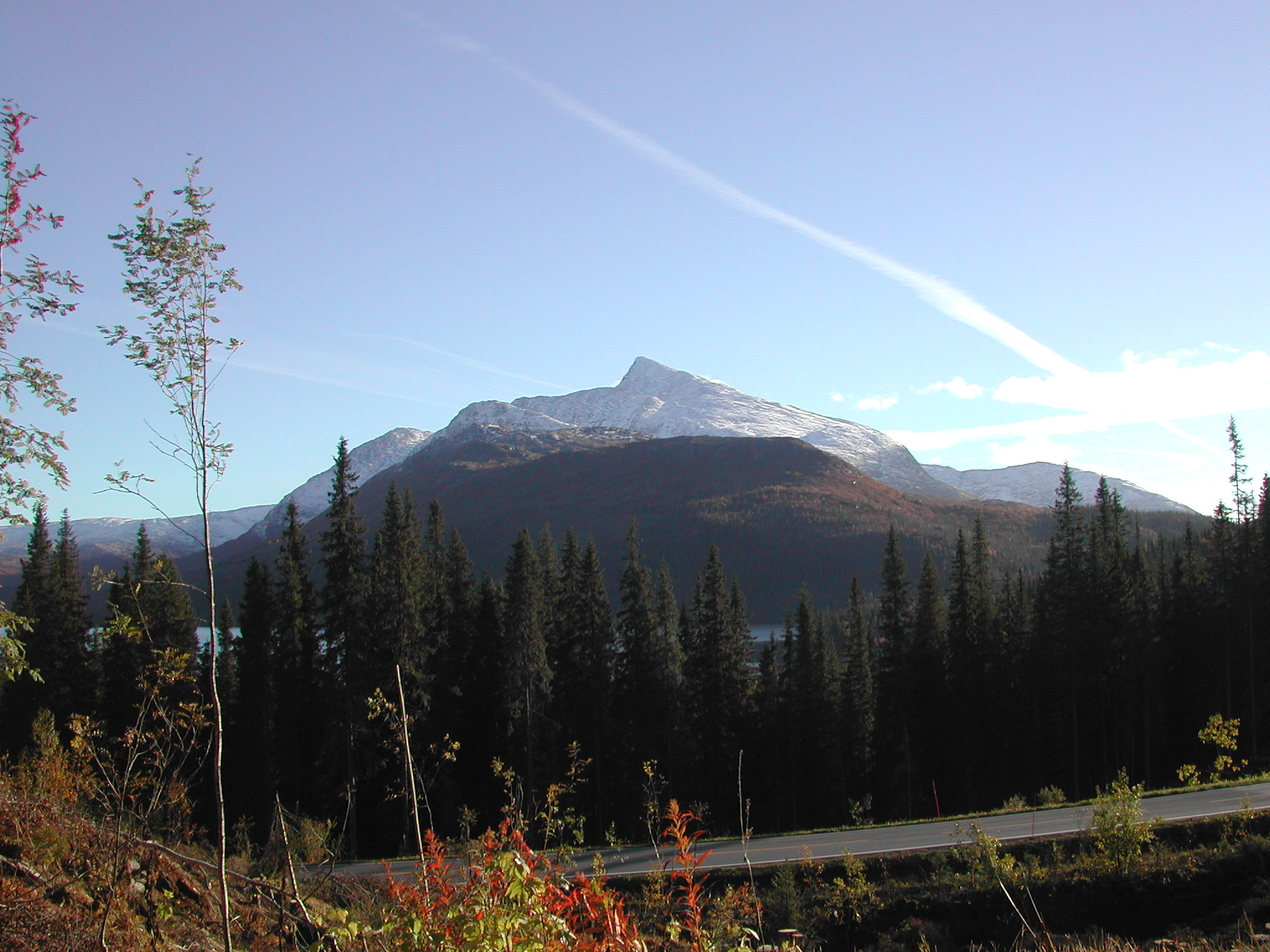
- Luktinden seen from Korgfjellvegen, going along the E6 to Luktvatnet

Highest point
- Elevation: 1,343 m (4,406 ft)
- Coordinates: 65.9904°N 13.5447°E

Geography
- Interactive map of the mountain
- Location: Nordland, Norway
- Topo map: 1927 III Elsfjord and 1926 IV Fustvatnet

Lukttinden is a 1,343-metre (4,406 ft) tall mountain in Vefsn Municipality in Nordland county, Norway. The mountain lies between the towns of Mo i Rana and Mosjøen, directly east of the lake Ømmervatnet and directly south of the lake Luktvatnet. It lies to the west of the Okstindan mountains. Lukttinden is well known for having easy hiking conditions.

== Name ==
The mountain is named after the lake Luktvatnet. This name is probably from the Southern Sami language word Loektejaevrie, a compound of loekti which means 'inlet' and jaevrie which means 'lake', thus "the lake with many inlets". The suffix -tinden is the finite form of tind meaning 'mountain peak'.
