= Drevvatnet =

Lake in Vefsn, Norway

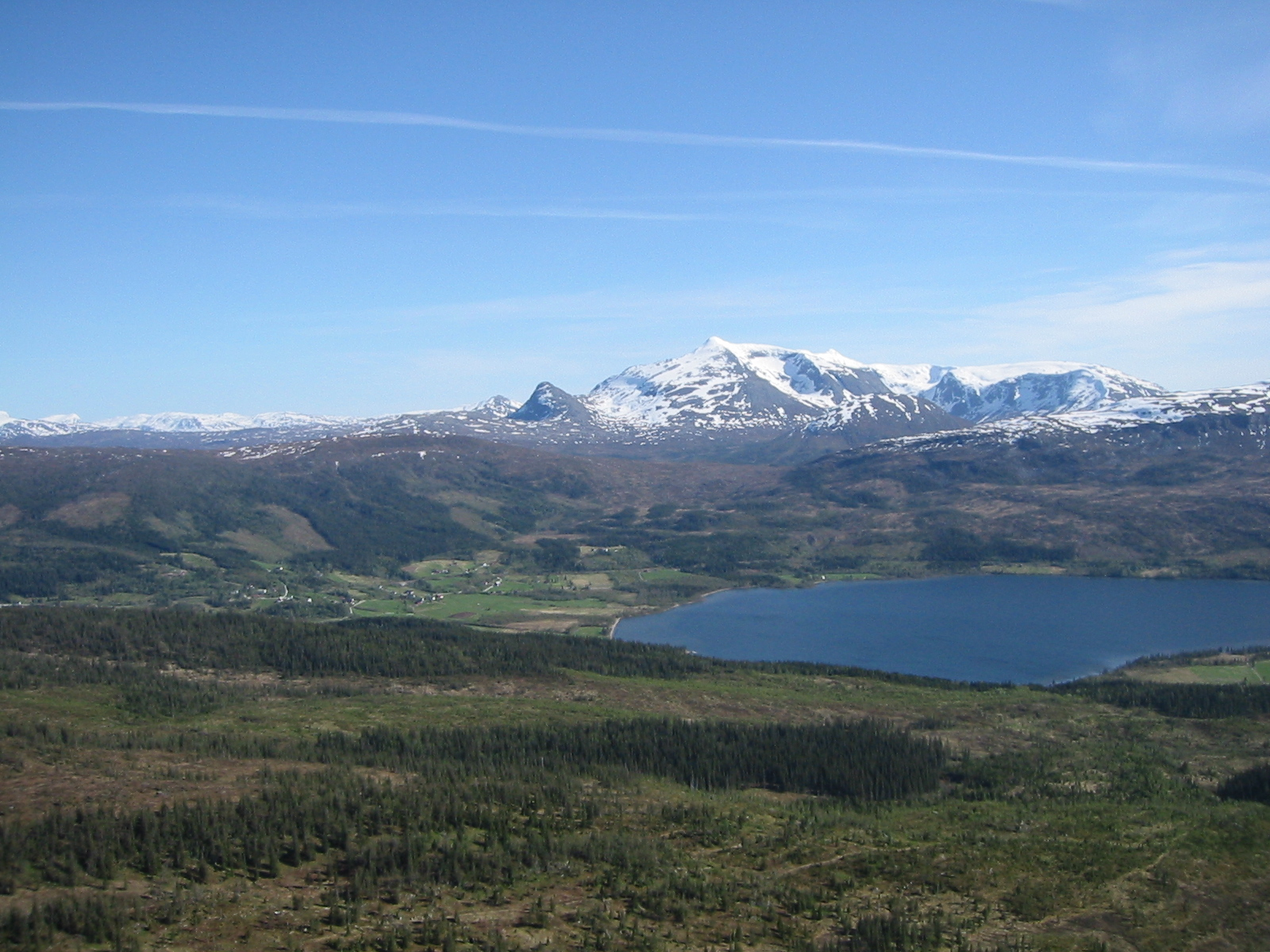
- Interactive map of the lake
- Location: Vefsn Municipality, Nordland
- Coordinates: 66.0549°N 13.3901°E
- Basin countries: Norway
- Max. length: 4.3 kilometres (2.7 mi)
- Max. width: 1.7 kilometres (1.1 mi)
- Surface area: 4.93 km^{2} (1.90 sq mi)
- Shore length^{1}: 11.74 kilometres (7.29 mi)
- Surface elevation: 48 metres (157 ft)
- References: NVE
- ^{1} Shore length is not a well-defined measure.

Drevvatnet is a lake that lies in Vefsn Municipality in Nordland county, Norway. The village of Drevvassbygda lies at the northeastern end of the 4.93-square-kilometre (1.90 sq mi) lake, in the Drevjedalen valley. The Nordland Line railway follows the southern coast of the lake.

== Name ==
The first element is the name of the river Drevja and the last element is the finite form of vatn which means "lake".

== See also ==
- List of lakes in Norway
- Geography of Norway
