= Elsfjord =

Village in Vefsn Municipality, Norway

- Village
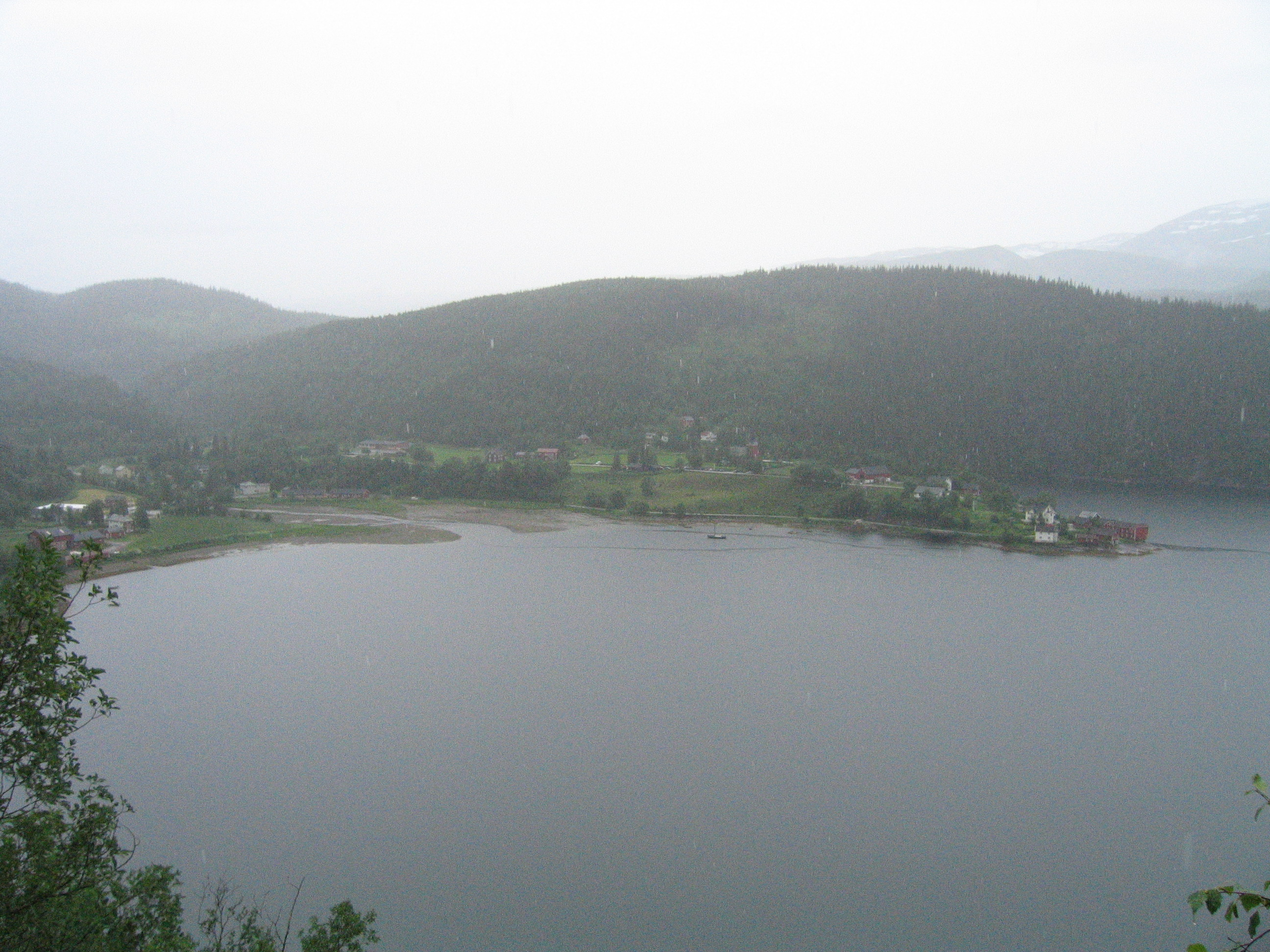
- View of the village
- Interactive map of Elsfjord
- Location within Nordland Location within Norway
- Coordinates: 66.1032°N 13.5483°E
- Country: Norway
- Region: Northern Norway
- County: Nordland
- District: Helgeland
- Municipality: Vefsn Municipality
- Elevation: 3 m (9.8 ft)
- Time zone: UTC+01:00 (CET)
  - Summer (DST): UTC+02:00 (CEST)
- Post Code: 8672 Elsfjord

Elsfjord is a village in Vefsn Municipality in Nordland county, Norway. The village is located at the end of the Elsfjorden, about 35 kilometres (22 mi) northeast of the town of Mosjøen. The European route E06 highway is accessed about 4 kilometres (2.5 mi) south of the village. Elsfjord Church is located in the village.

The village was the administrative centre of the old Elsfjord Municipality during its existence from 1929 to 1964.

The Nordlandsbanen railway line passes through the village, stopping at Elsfjord Station.

== See also ==
- Prison camps in North Norway during World War Two, including at Elsfjord
