= Vefsnfjorden =

Fjord in Nordland, Norway

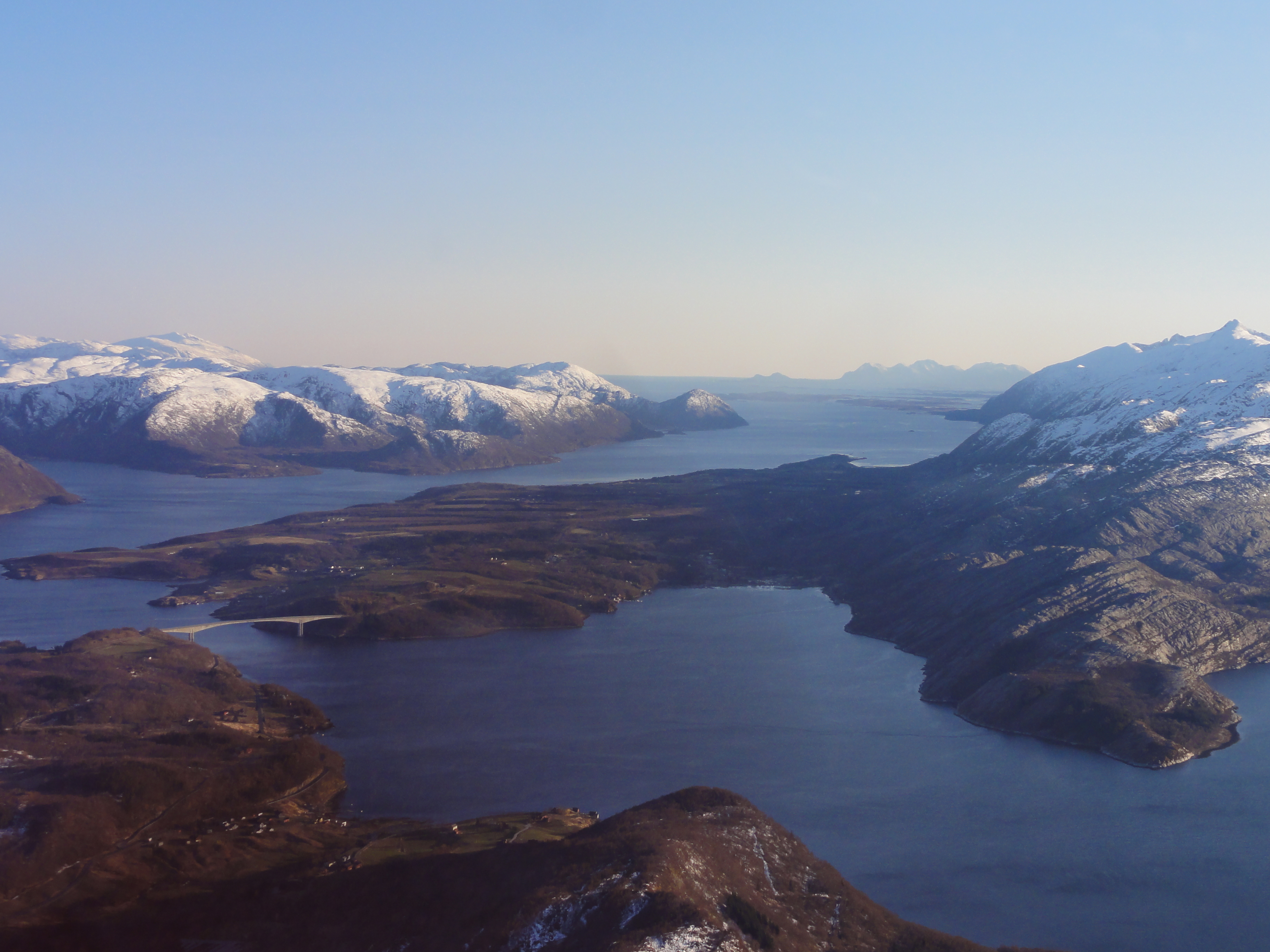
- View of the fjord
- Interactive map of the fjord
- Location: Nordland county, Norway
- Coordinates: 65.9047°N 12.6106°E
- Type: Fjord
- Basin countries: Norway
- Max. length: 51 kilometres (32 mi)
- Max. depth: 440 metres (1,440 ft)
- Settlements: Mosjøen

Vefsnfjorden is a fjord in the traditional district of Helgeland in Nordland county, Norway. It is about 51 kilometres (32 mi) long, reaching a maximum depth of about 440 metres (1,440 ft) below sea level. The fjord flows through Alstahaug Municipality, Leirfjord Municipality, and Vefsn Municipality.

The fjord begins at the island of Tjøtta (south of the island of Alsta). The fjord heads northeast to the village of Sundøya at the northern end of Alsta where a small channel connects to the Leirfjorden. At this point, the fjord turns to the southeast as it proceeds inland to the town of Mosjøen where it ends. The outer part of the fjord is also called Sørfjord.

Several large rivers run into the Vefsnfjord, including the Vefsna, Fusta, and Drevja. All the three rivers are traditionally excellent salmon fishing rivers, although they have now been infected with the salmon parasite Gyrodactylus salaris.

A German prisoner ship was sunk in the Vefsnfjorden by British Aircraft during World War II with major loss of life. A memorial is located on a nearby island.

A powerline crosses Vefsnfjorden near Overtroan with a 3.236-kilometre (2.011 mi) long span.

== Media gallery ==
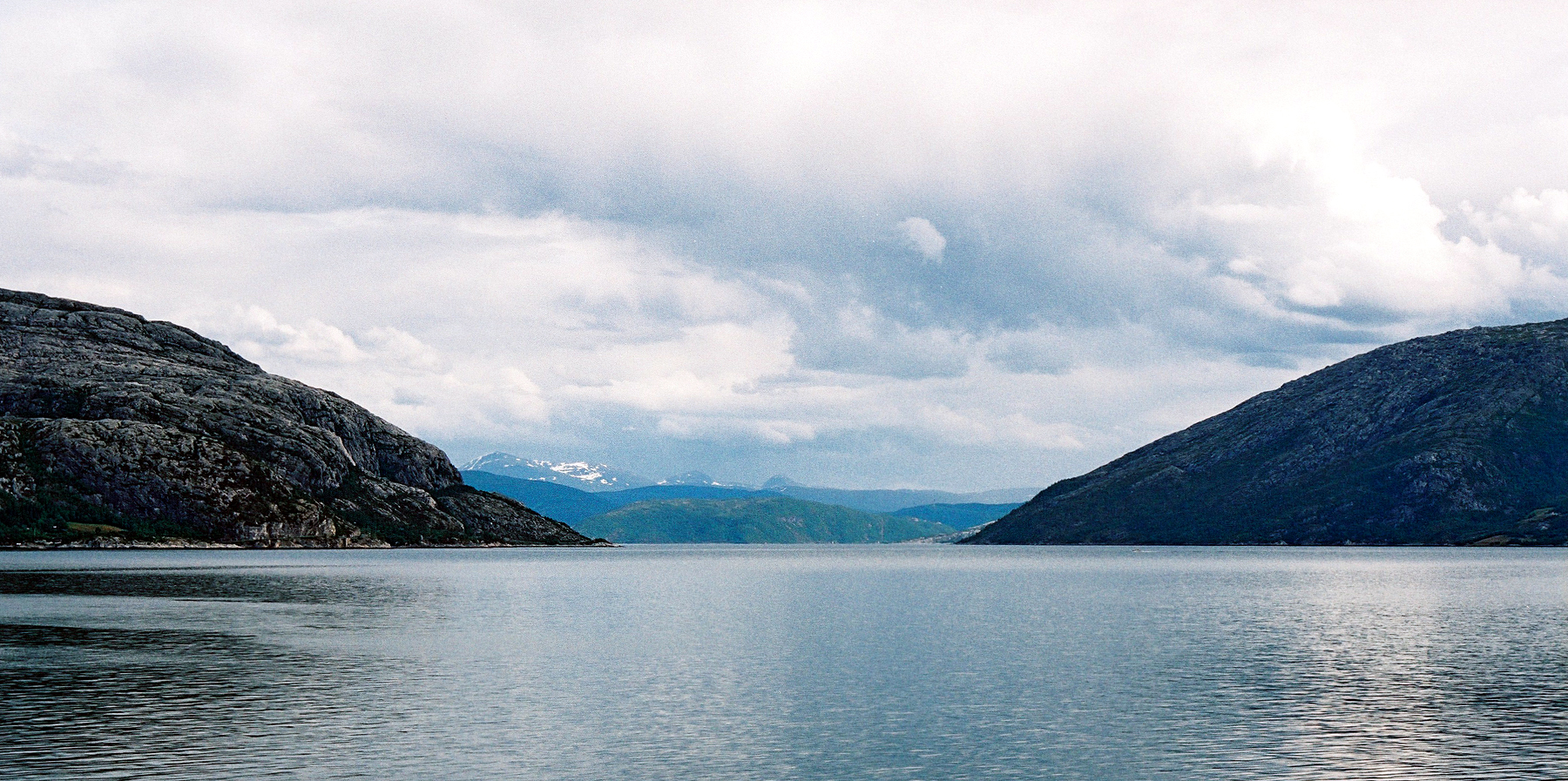

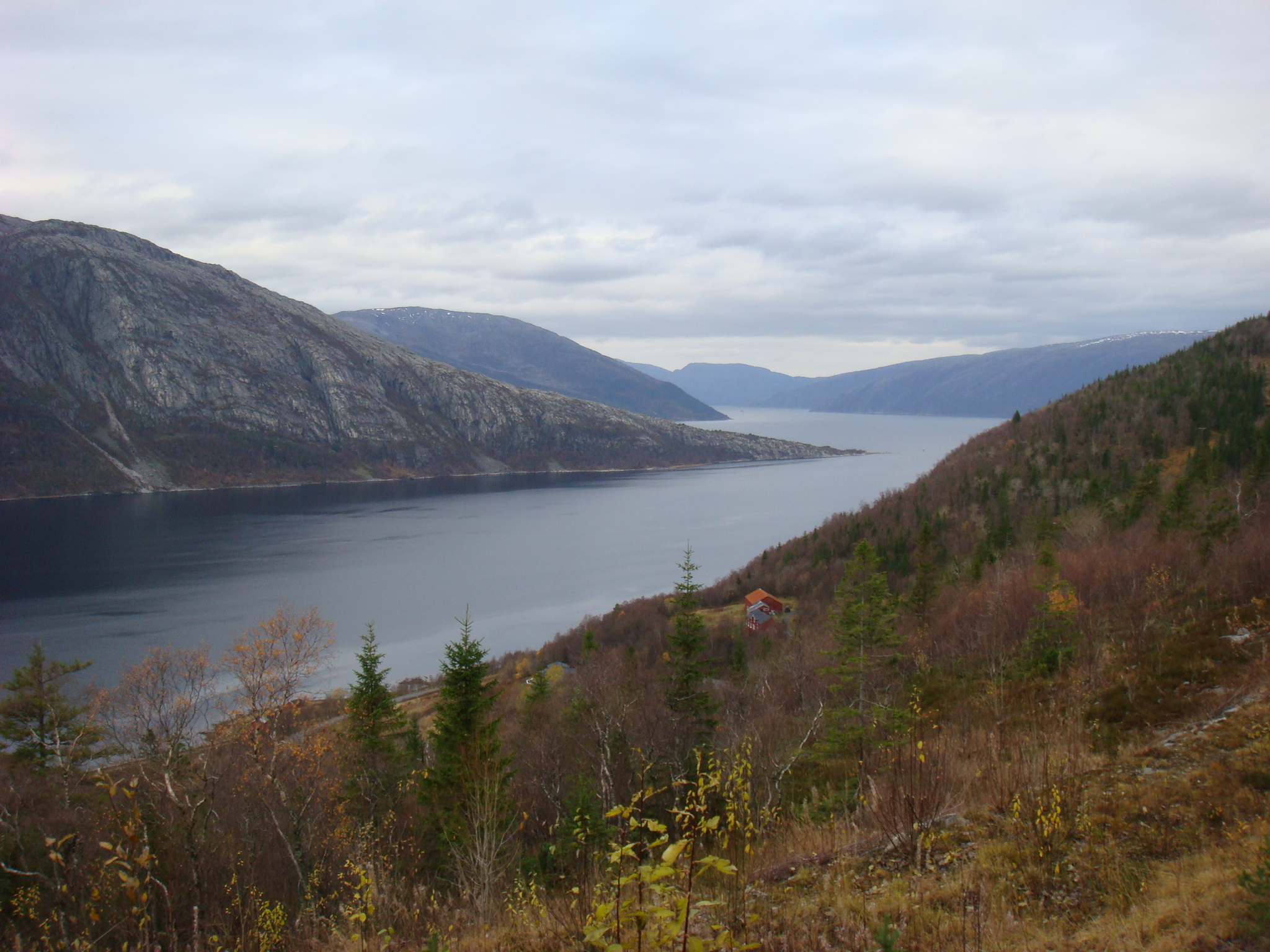

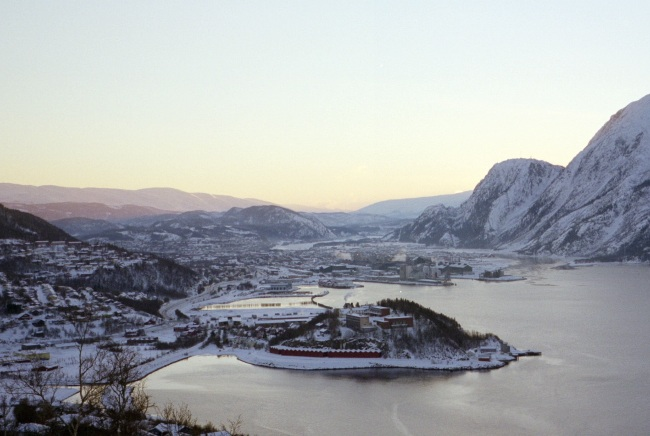

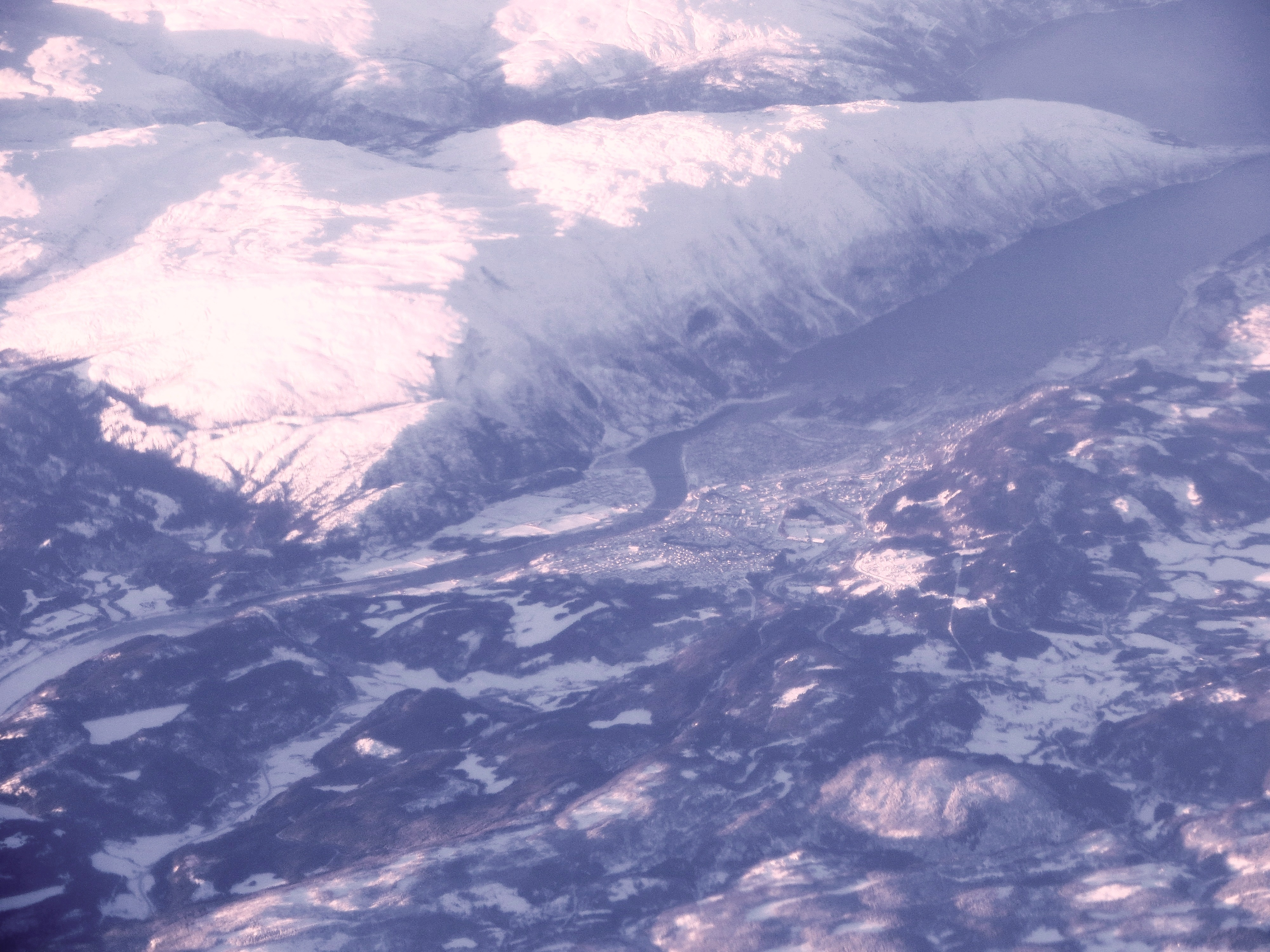

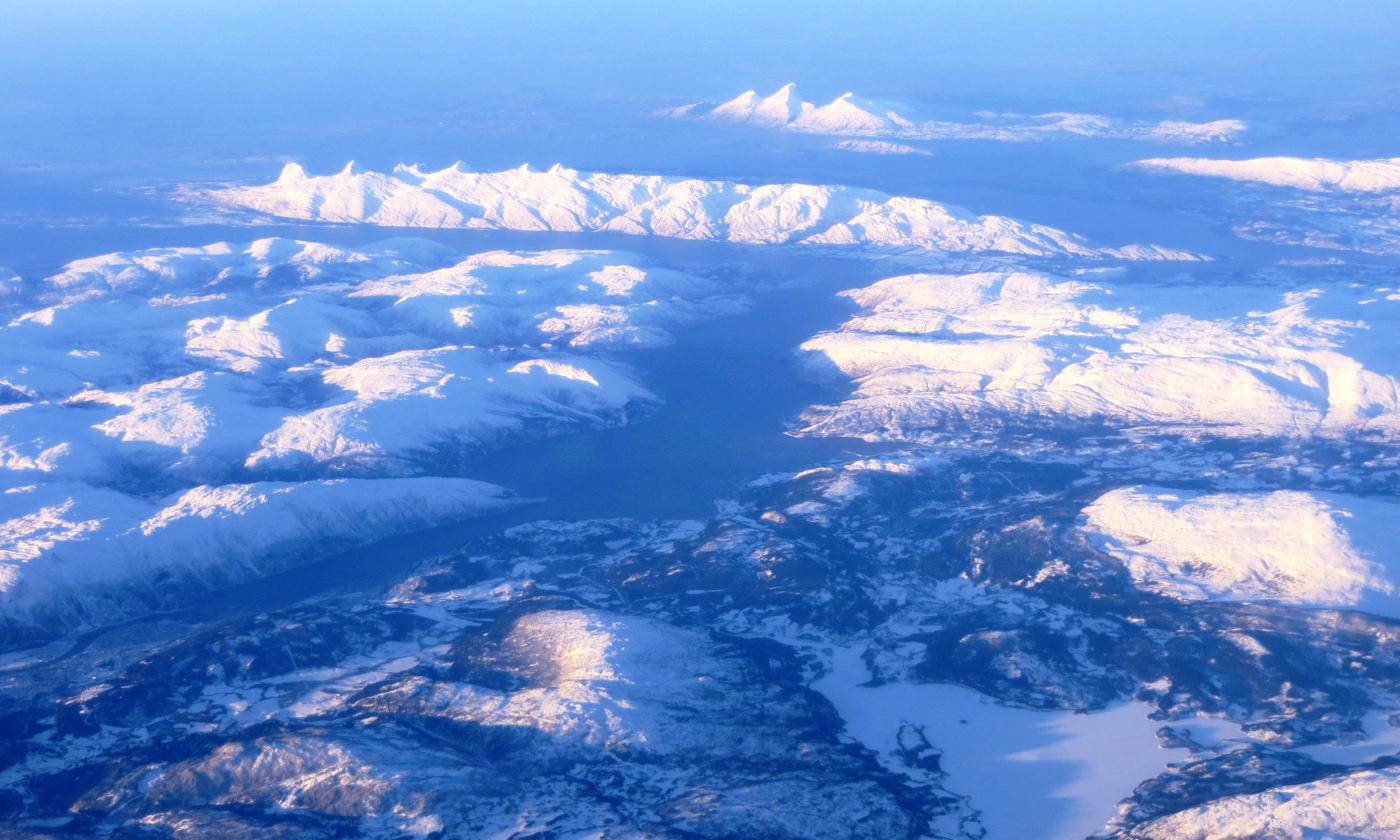

== See also ==
- List of Norwegian fjords
