= Ømmervatnet =

Lake in Vefsn, Norway

- Interactive map of the lake
- Location: Vefsn Municipality, Nordland
- Coordinates: 65.9911°N 13.4037°E
- Basin countries: Norway
- Max. length: 4 kilometres (2.5 mi)
- Max. width: 2.2 kilometres (1.4 mi)
- Surface area: 5.35 km^{2} (2.07 sq mi)
- Shore length^{1}: 11.99 kilometres (7.45 mi)
- Surface elevation: 42 metres (138 ft)
- References: NVE
- ^{1} Shore length is not a well-defined measure.

Ømmervatnet is a lake that lies in Vefsn Municipality in Nordland county, Norway. The European route E06 highway passes along the eastern coast of the lake. The 5.35-square-kilometre (2.07 sq mi) lake lies about 4 kilometres (2.5 mi) east of the village of Drevjemoen and about 20 kilometres (12 mi) northeast of the town of Mosjøen.

== See also ==
- List of lakes in Norway
- Geography of Norway
