= Lomsdal–Visten National Park =

National park in Nordland, Norway

- IUCN category II (national park)

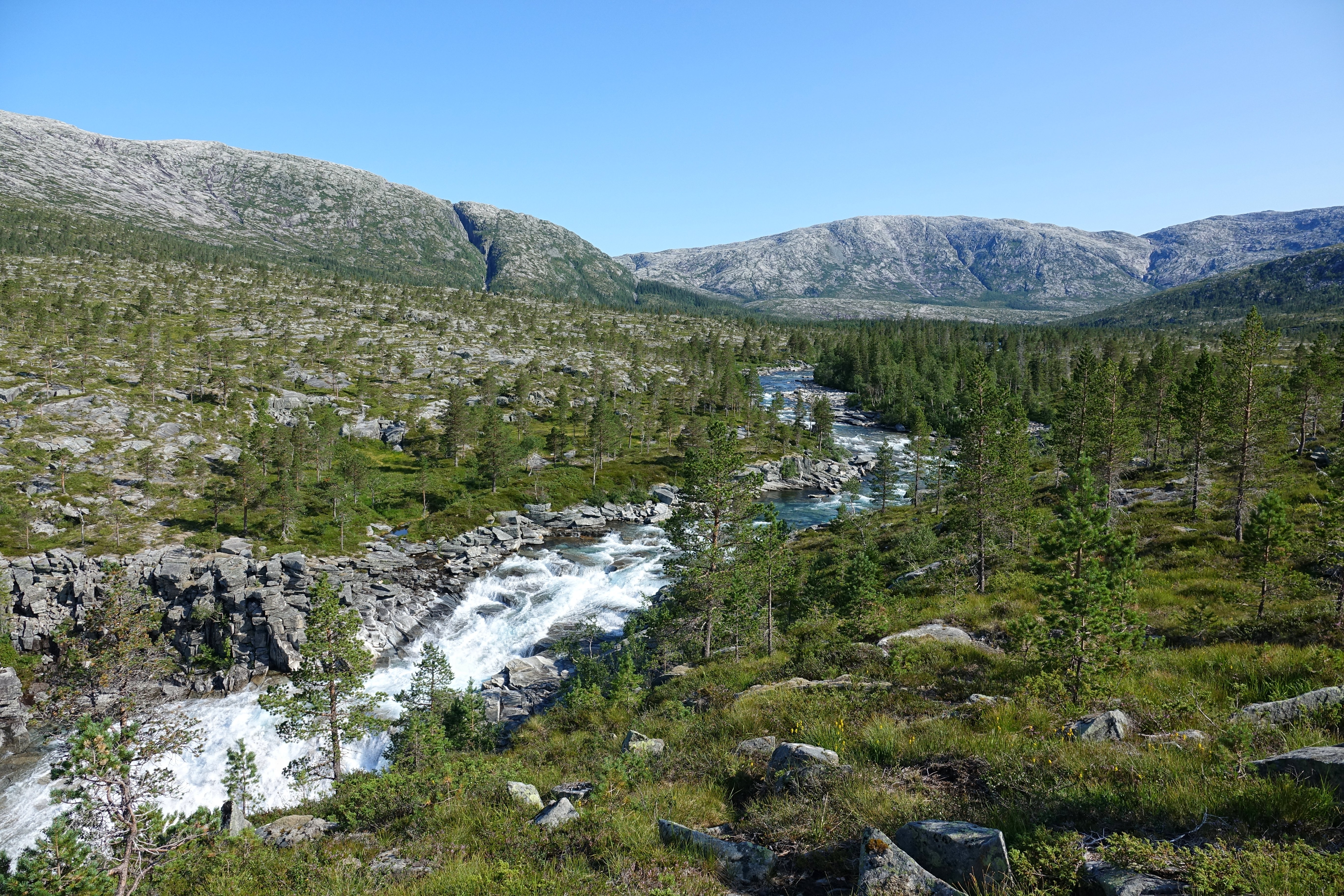
- River in Lomsdalen
- Interactive map of Lomsdal–Visten National Park
- Location: Nordland, Norway
- Nearest city: Brønnøysund, Mosjøen
- Coordinates: 65.48333°N 13.000°E
- Area: 1,102 km^{2} (425 sq mi)
- Established: 26 June 2009
- Governing body: Norwegian Directorate for Nature Management

Lomsdal–Visten National Park (Norwegian: Lomsdal–Visten nasjonalpark, Southern Sami: Njaarken vaarjelimmiedajve) is a Norwegian national park that was established on 26 June 2009. The park consists of a total protected area of 1,102 square kilometres (425 sq mi). It is located in Nordland county, Norway, and covers parts of Brønnøy Municipality, Vevelstad Municipality, Grane Municipality, and Vefsn Municipality.

The landscape is dominated by great diversity and many rivers. There are steep-sided fjords with deciduous woodlands, coniferous forests, mountainous terrains, and alpine peaks. The rich and varied geology was another reason for protecting the area. Karstic terrain with caves, subterranean rivers, arches, and unusual weathering are found here.

== History ==
Cultural heritage relics have been found that date from the Mesolithic period (8000–9000 years ago) up to the present day. Traces of Sámi culture can be found in the national park dating from the time when the Sámi were hunters and gatherers up to their modern semi-domesticated reindeer husbandry.

Farms that were abandoned due to the Black Death were re-cleared from 1500 to 1800 by ethnic Norwegians who expanded into the Sámi areas. They cleared farms along the fjords, the larger valleys, and far into the mountains. Traces of how they used the area can be seen near the farms and on outlying land.

The Second World War also left its mark in the Lomsdal-Visten area, and an annual march goes from inner Visten to Eiterådalen to commemorate wartime events.

== Park rules ==
The following are park rules for visitors:

- Visitors are allowed to pick wild berries and mushrooms.
- Undue noise is prohibited in the national park.
