= Mo i Rana Airport =

Mo i Rana Airport may refer to:

- Mo i Rana Airport, Fagerlia, an upcoming regional airport in Rana, Norway scheduled to open in 2027
- Mo i Rana Airport, Røssvoll, a regional airport in Rana, Norway
