= Fru Haugans Hotel =

Hotel in Mosjøen, Norway

Coordinates: 65.8357°N 13.1906°E

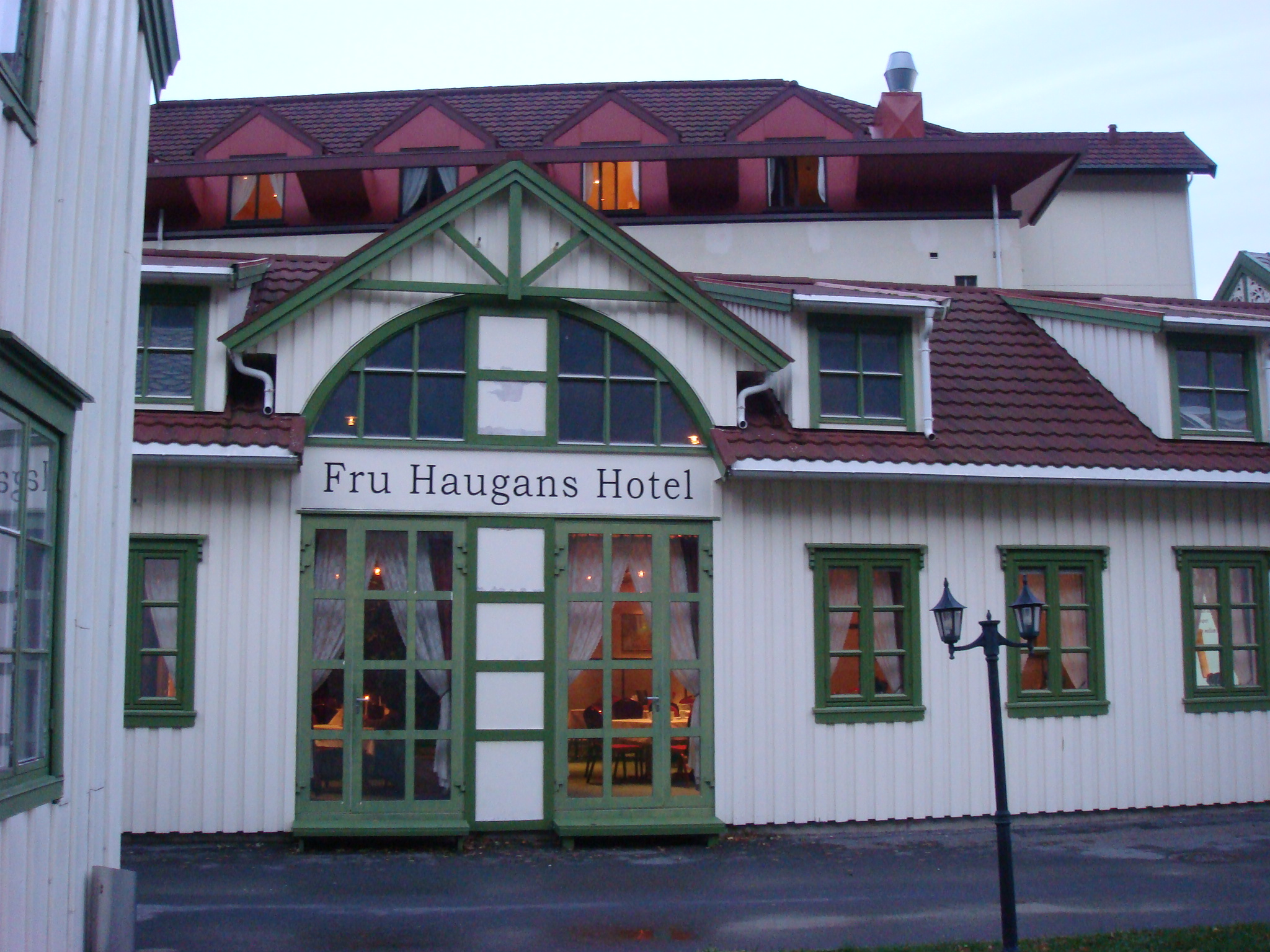
Fru Haugans Hotel

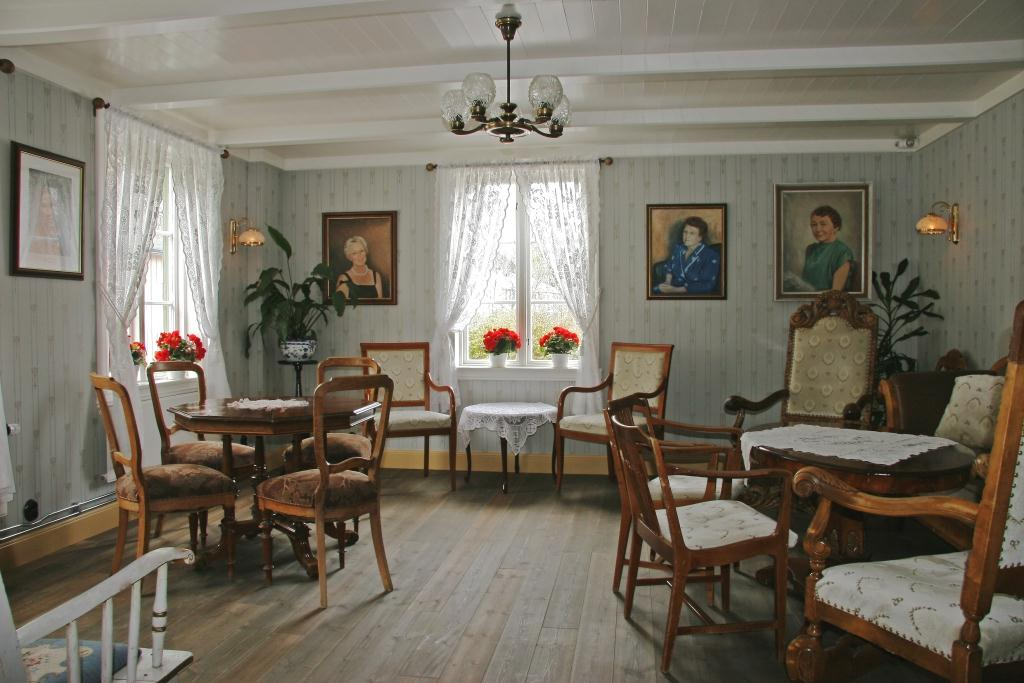
Fru Haugans Hotel interior

Fru Haugans Hotel is a historic hotel located in Mosjøen, in Vefsn Municipality in the central Helgeland district of Nordland, Norway.

== History ==
Fru Haugans Hotel is the oldest hotel within North Norway. The origin of the hotel dates to 1794 when a farmer's son and captain obtained royal consent to open a trading post and guesthouse. The hotel is named for Ellen Haugan who acquired the hotel in 1885. When Ellen Haugan died in 1914, her youngest daughter, Eli Haugan Jenssen-Hals, assumed management. Eli Jenssen-Hals died in 1962. Her niece, Eli Marie Jürgensen, then took a leading role in the operation. Her niece, Bjørg Jürgensen Johannessen and her family became the owners in 1997. Bjørg Johannessen died in 2004, and then her children took over as the fifth generation in the family.

The hotel has been enlarged and modernized over the years. After extensive restoration and conversion, the completed hotel offers accommodation in 76 rooms, a large conference center, new restaurants, lobby, bar and parking area. Fru Haugans Hotel is located near the Mosjøen Railway Station and Bus Terminal with access to the Mosjøen Airport, Kjærstad.

The hotel buildings are situated on Sjøgata street on the Vefsna River in the town center. Some rooms are furnished with historic Norwegian furnishings and furniture approved by the Norwegian Directorate for Cultural Heritage. The hotel is known for its superb cooking, offering traditional Norwegian food and dishes.
