= Mosjøen Station =

Railway station in Vefsn, Norway

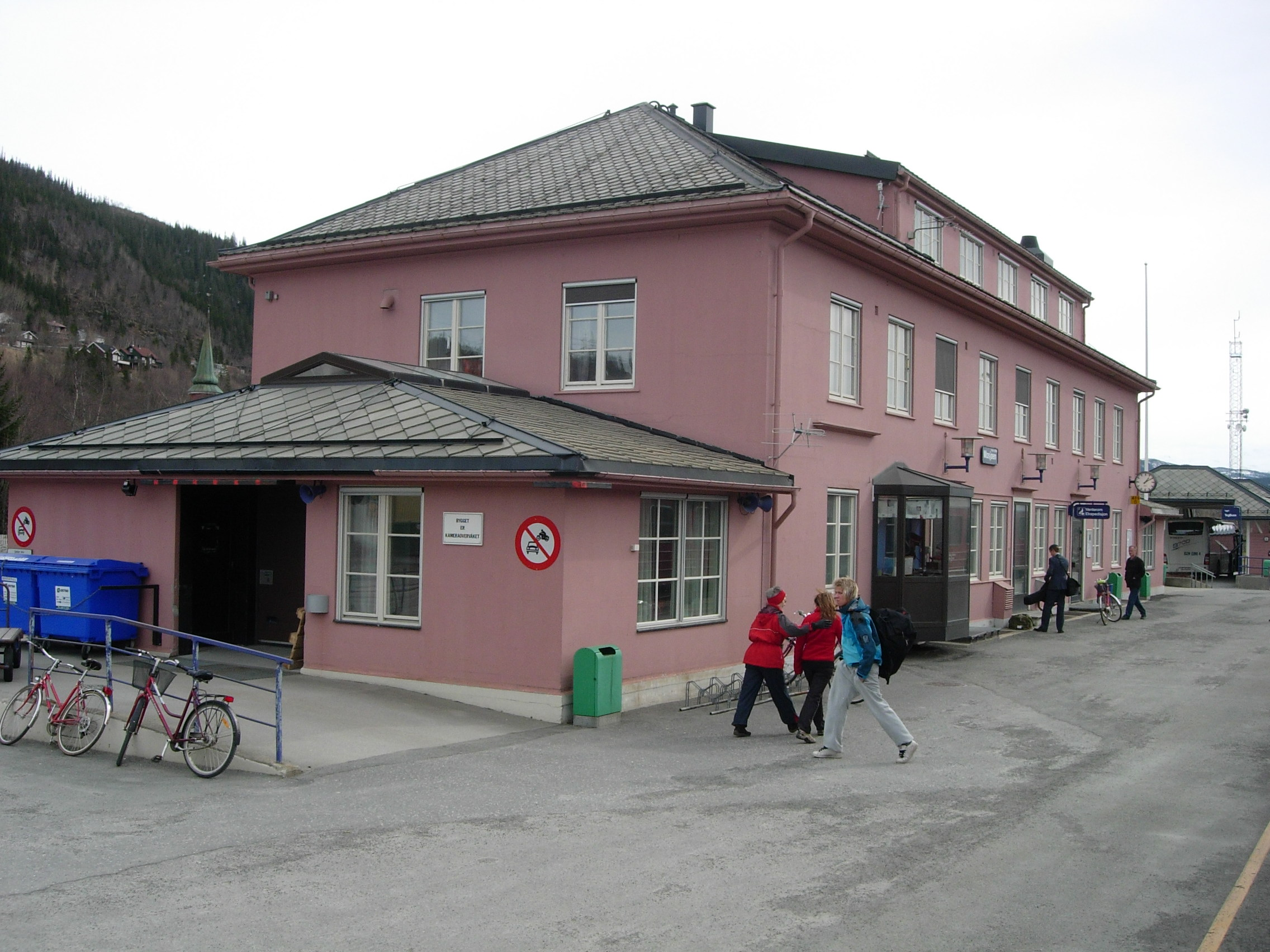

General information
- Location: Mosjøen, Vefsn Municipality; Norway
- Coordinates: 65°50′40″N 13°12′00″E
- Elevation: 6.8 m (22 ft) AMSL
- Owner: Bane NOR
- Operator: SJ Norge
- Line: Nordland Line
- Distance: 406.01 km (252.28 mi)
- Platforms: 2

Other information
- Station code: MSJ

History
- Opened: 1940
Location
- Location within Norway

Mosjøen Station (Norwegian: Mosjøen stasjon) is a railway station located in the town of Mosjøen in Vefsn Municipality in Nordland county, Norway. The station is located along the Nordland Line. The station opened in 1940. Since 1 March 1948, the restaurant operations were taken over by Norsk Spisevognselskap.

Preceding station	Express trains	Following station
Trofors towards Trondheim S	F7	Drevvatn towards Bodø
