= Mo i Rana Airport, Fagerlia =

- IATA: probably MQN; ICAO: ENMR

Summary
- Operator: Avinor
- Serves: Mo i Rana
- Opened: planned 2027
- Elevation AMSL: 140 m (460 ft)
- Coordinates: 66°19′40″N 014°20′0″E
- Website: Ny flyplass Mo i Rana - Avinor
- Interactive map of Mo i Rana Airport, Fagerlia

Runways
Direction	Length		Surface
Direction	ft	m	Surface
08/26	7,900	2,400

Mo i Rana Airport, Fagerlia (Norwegian: Mo i Rana lufthavn; ICAO: ENMR) is a regional airport under construction, which will serve the town of Mo i Rana in Rana Municipality and surrounding municipalities in Nordland county, Norway. The airport will be located about 10 kilometres (6.2 mi) outside the town.

It will replace the old nearby airport Mo i Rana Airport, Røssvoll which has a very short runway and only allows small propeller aircraft on short distances, mainly to Trondheim and Bodø. The new airport will have a fairly long runway allowing 6-seats wide jet aircraft going to Oslo and on international routes.

== History ==
In 2002 the Ministry of Transport launched an idea of merging the three airports serving Northern Helgeland: Mosjøen Airport, Sandnessjøen Airport, and Mo i Rana Airport into one new airport with a large enough runway to fly jet aircraft like Airbus A320 or Boeing 737 aircraft directly to Oslo, and make it unnecessary to operate subsidized regional aircraft to Helgeland. There are also doubts about the future availability of large enough aircraft for 800-metre (2,600 ft) runways. Better roads between the areas including two long tunnels (Korgfjell Tunnel (opened in 2005) and Toven Tunnel (opened in 2014)) have also been built. It is not possible to extend the present runway at Røssvoll. A location was selected at Drevjadalen in Vefsn Municipality, about 15 kilometres (9.3 mi) north of Mosjøen (which is 55 kilometres (34 mi) from Sandnessjøen and 70 kilometres (43 mi) from Mo i Rana). Meteorological tests showed that the location was too foggy, so a new location was searched for.

In June 2013 the parliament decided to build the new airport a few kilometers south of Røssvoll airport, and there was a construction start ceremony with the Prime minister in 2017. Still the real construction start got delayed because the government delayed their financial support. In May 2020 the government decided to take over the leadership of the airport construction through its airport company Avinor. Until then a municipality owned company led the project. This required redoing the plan, but in March 2021 the plans were done and were given go-ahead.

Construction start was still been delayed due to formalities. The first construction contracts were signed on 8 July 2022. On 26 September 2022, construction works started with a ceremony. Planned opening of the new airport was 2025. But already in February 2023, the plan for opening was changed to 2027. In June 2023, financing was agreed upon, including 66 million kr from Rana Municipality, to make the runway 2,400 metres (7,900 ft) instead of 2,200 metres (7,200 ft), which will allow Boeing 737-800 and similar aircraft to take off and land fully loaded also in slippery icy conditions.

Paving of the runway started in July 2024, and was finished in early 2026. A ceremony for the construction start of the terminal building was held in September 2024.
