= Dolstad Church =

Church in Nordland, Norway

- Dolstad kirke
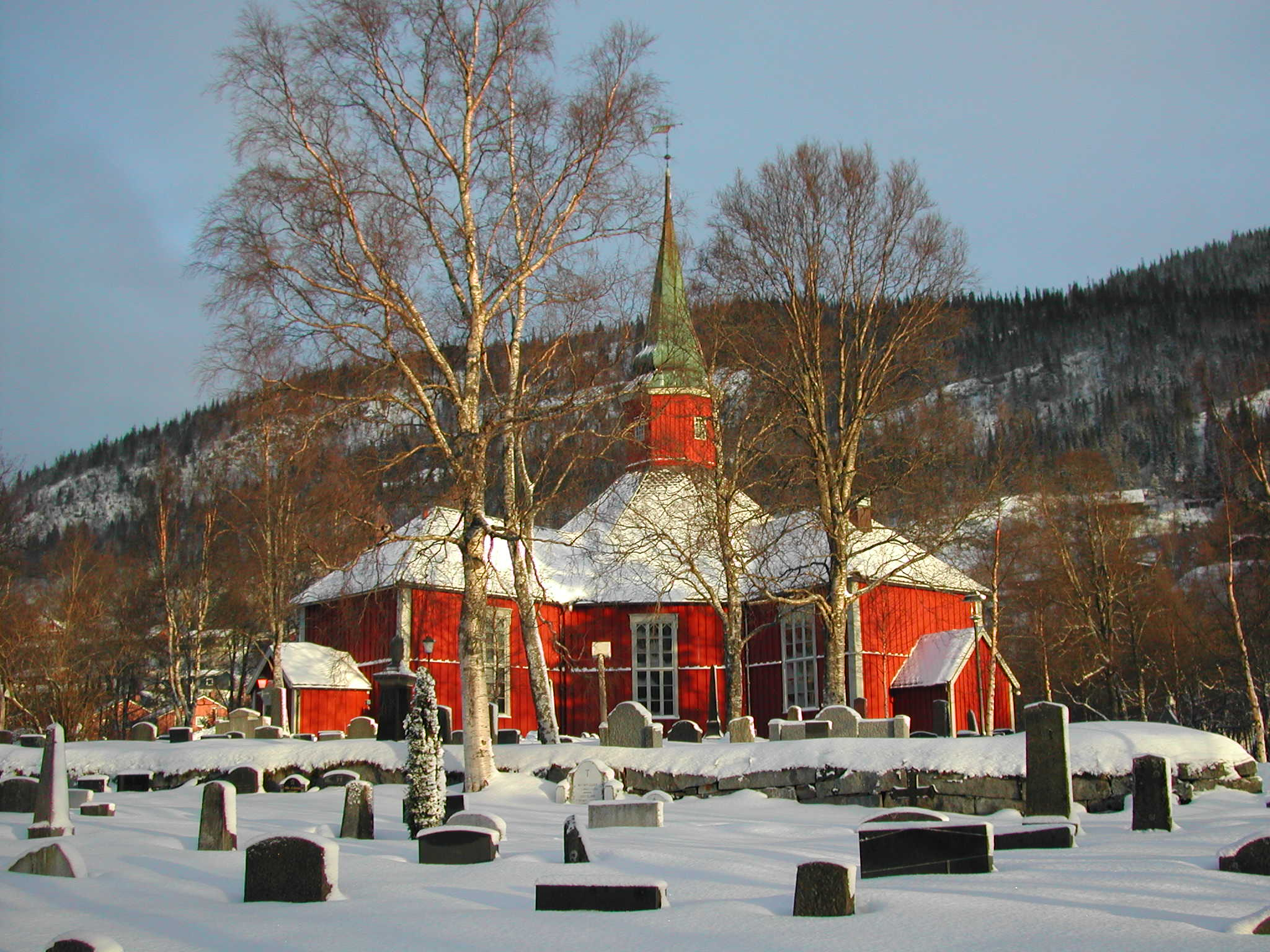
- View of the church
- Dolstad Church
- 65.8445028°N 13.2038984°E
- Location: Vefsn Municipality, Nordland
- Country: Norway
- Denomination: Church of Norway
- Churchmanship: Evangelical Lutheran

History
- Status: Parish church
- Founded: 12th century
- Dedication: St. Michael
- Consecrated: 7 August 1735

Architecture
- Functional status: Active
- Architect: Nils Pedersen Beck
- Architectural type: Octagonal
- Completed: 1734 (292 years ago)

Specifications
- Capacity: 500
- Materials: Wood

Administration
- Diocese: Sør-Hålogaland
- Deanery: Indre Helgeland prosti
- Parish: Dolstad
- Norwegian Cultural Heritage Site
- Type: Church
- Status: Automatically protected
- ID: 84028

Dolstad Church (Norwegian: Dolstad kirke) is a parish church of the Church of Norway in Vefsn Municipality in Nordland county, Norway. It is located in the town of Mosjøen. It is the church for the Dolstad parish which is part of the Indre Helgeland prosti (deanery) in the Diocese of Sør-Hålogaland. The red, wooden church was built in an octagonal style in 1734 by the architect Nils Pedersen Beck. The church seats about 500 people.

== History ==
The earliest existing historical records of the church date back to the year 1544, but the church was not new that year. The church was likely founded in the 12th century and it was located about 30 metres (98 ft) to the northeast of the present church site. In the 1640s, the church building was either renovated or completely rebuilt. The altarpiece is dated to 1644, so that may have been the year of construction. At that time, the church was a log building in a cruciform style with an entry porch at the west end. In 1730, work on a new church was begun and construction lasted for four years. The new building was located about 30 metres (98 ft) to the southwest of the old church. The new building was designed with four arms attached to the central octagon creating an octagonal-cruciform floor plan with a steeple above in the center of the church. After the new church was completed, the old church building was torn down. The church was consecrated by 7 August 1735 by the local provost Anders Dass, the son of poet and priest Petter Dass. In 1750, the church was dedicated to St. Michael. Around the year 1770, a sacristy was added to the east end of the choir.

In 1814, this church served as an election church (Norwegian: valgkirke). Together with more than 300 other parish churches across Norway, it was a polling station for elections to the 1814 Norwegian Constituent Assembly which wrote the Constitution of Norway. This was Norway's first national elections. Each church parish was a constituency that elected people called "electors" who later met together in each county to elect the representatives for the assembly that was to meet at Eidsvoll Manor later that year.

== Gallery ==
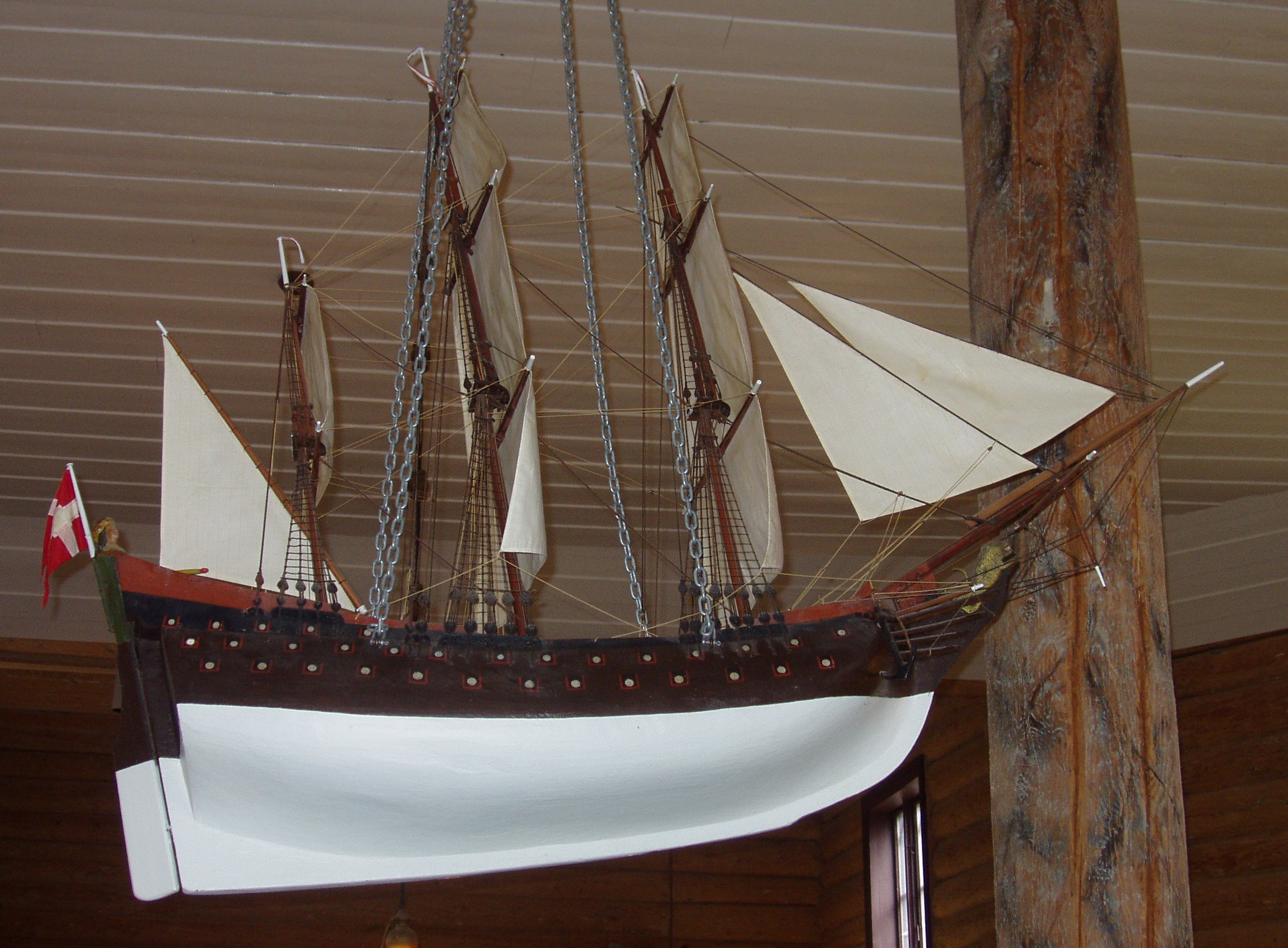
Ship that hangs in the church

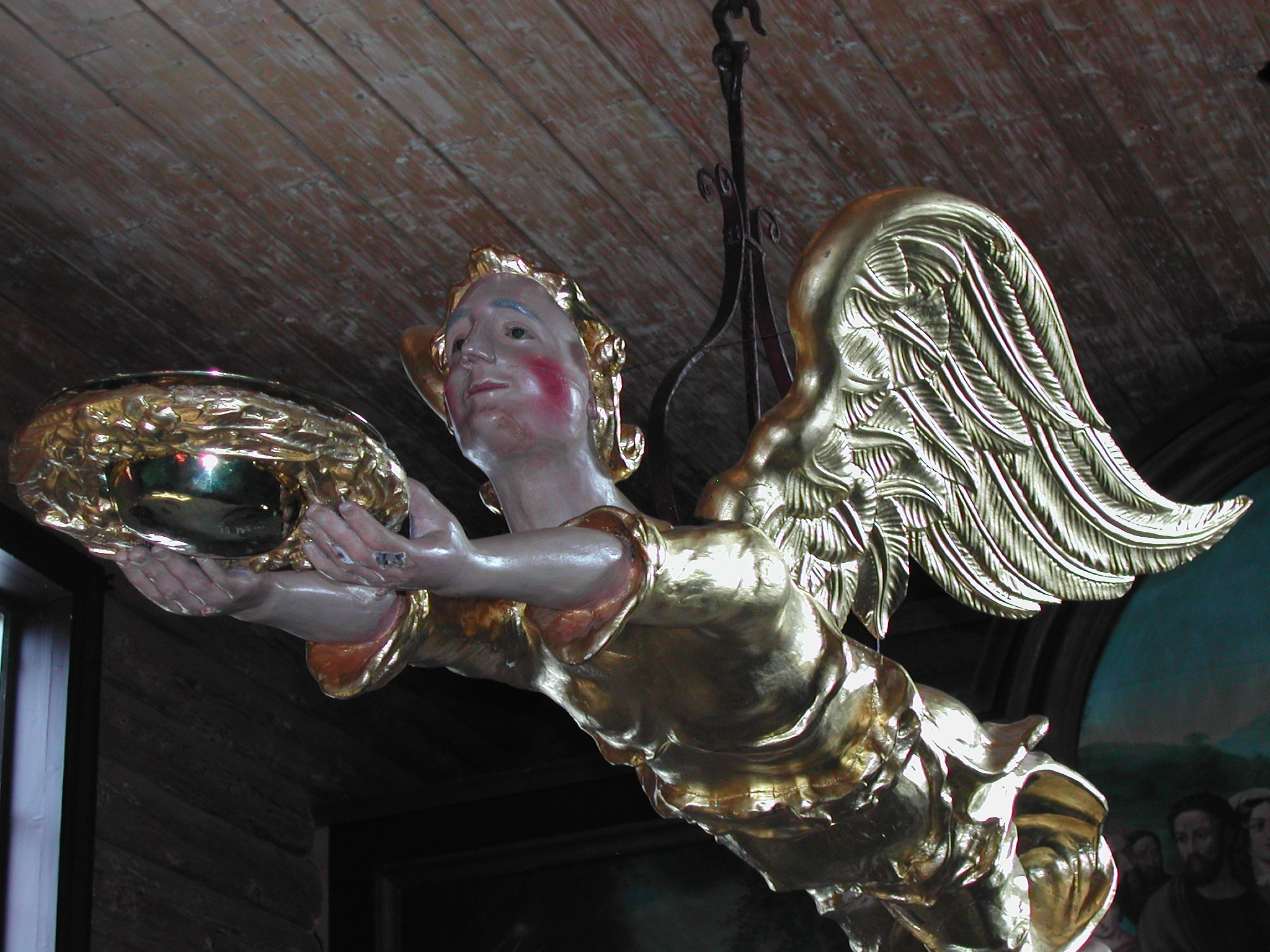
Hanging angel

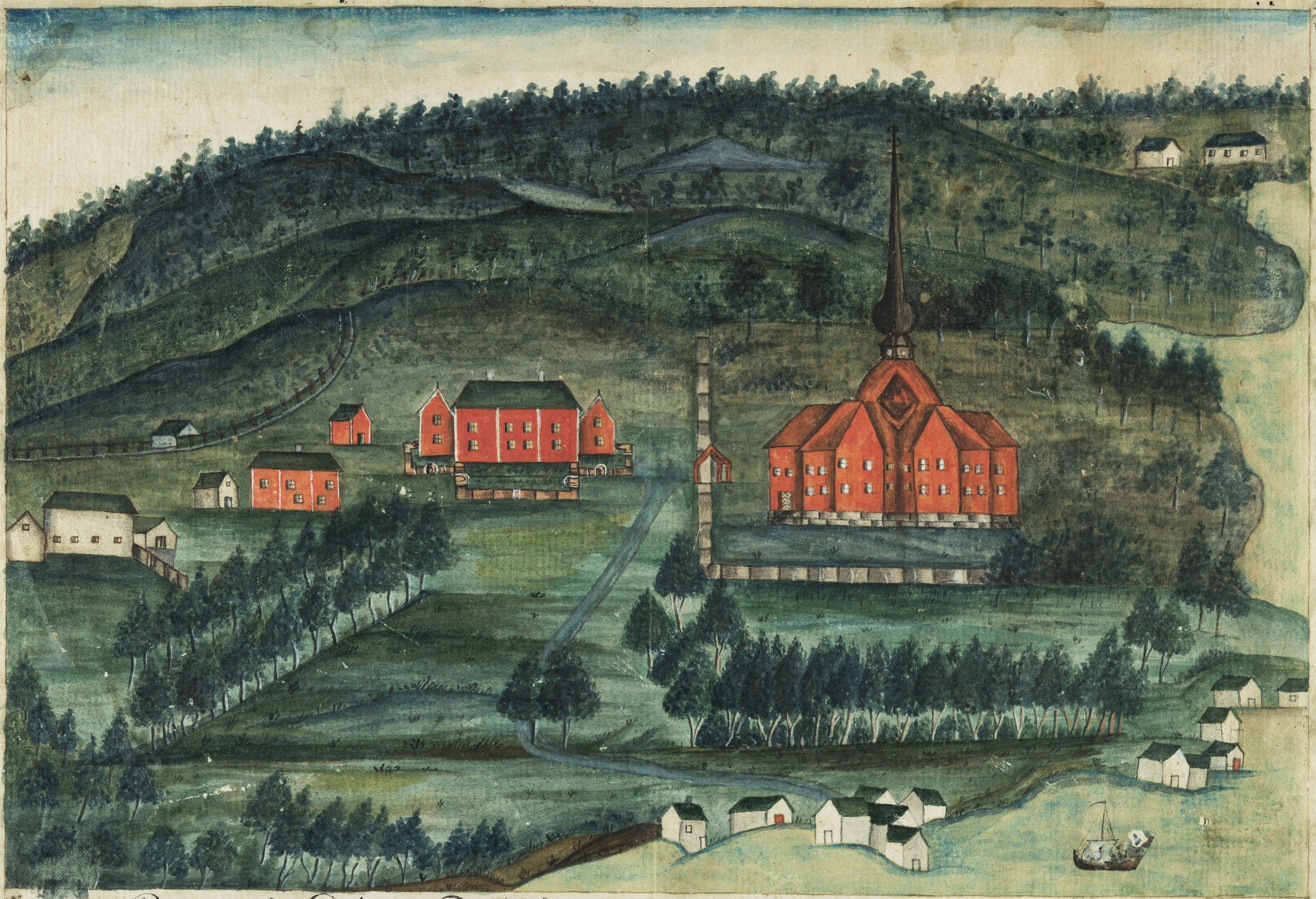
Painting of the church and parsonage

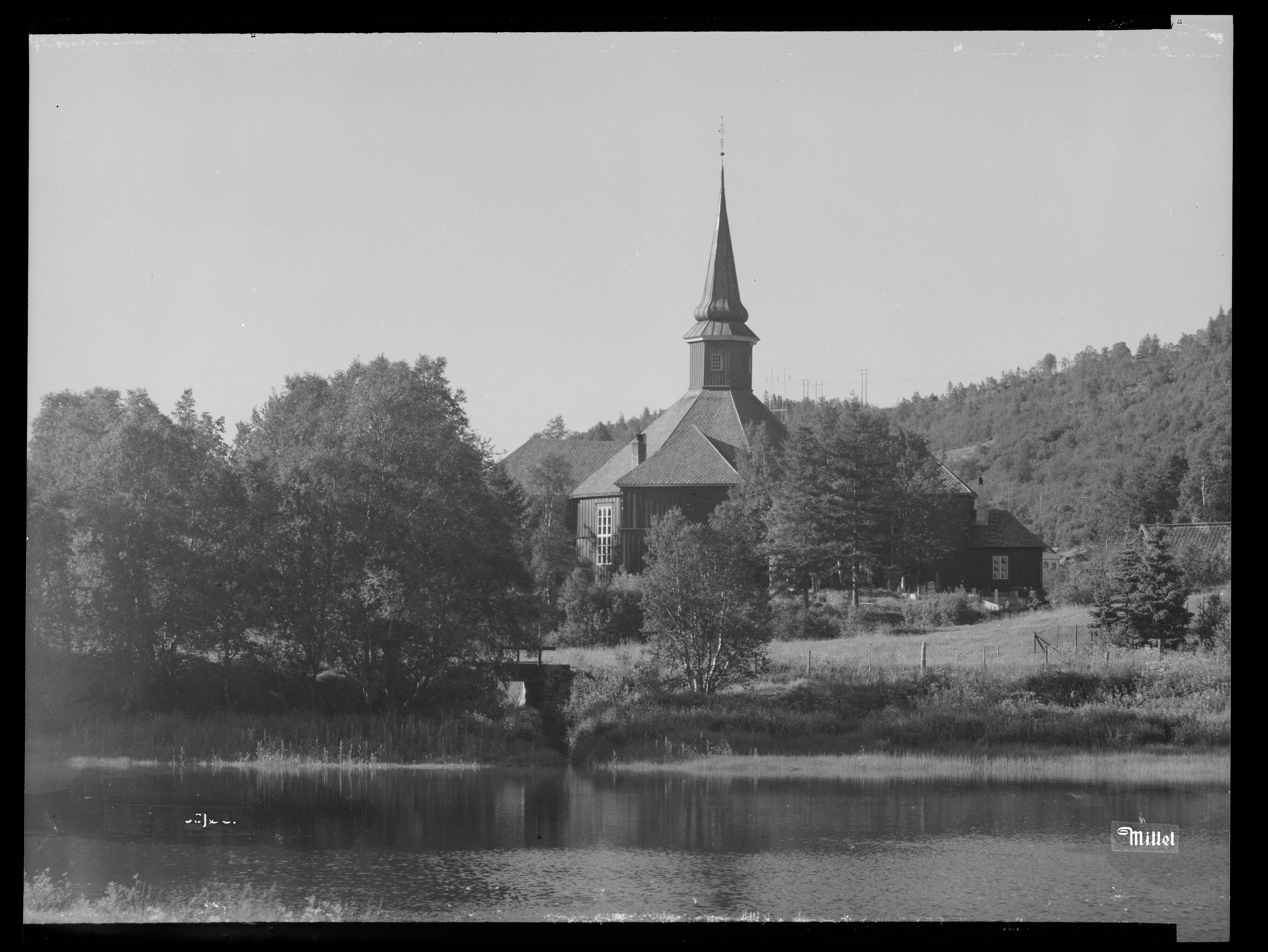
Old photo of the church (c. 1956)

== See also ==
- List of churches in Sør-Hålogaland
- Octagonal churches in Norway
