= Mosjøen Airport =

Mosjøen Airport Mosjøen lufthavn

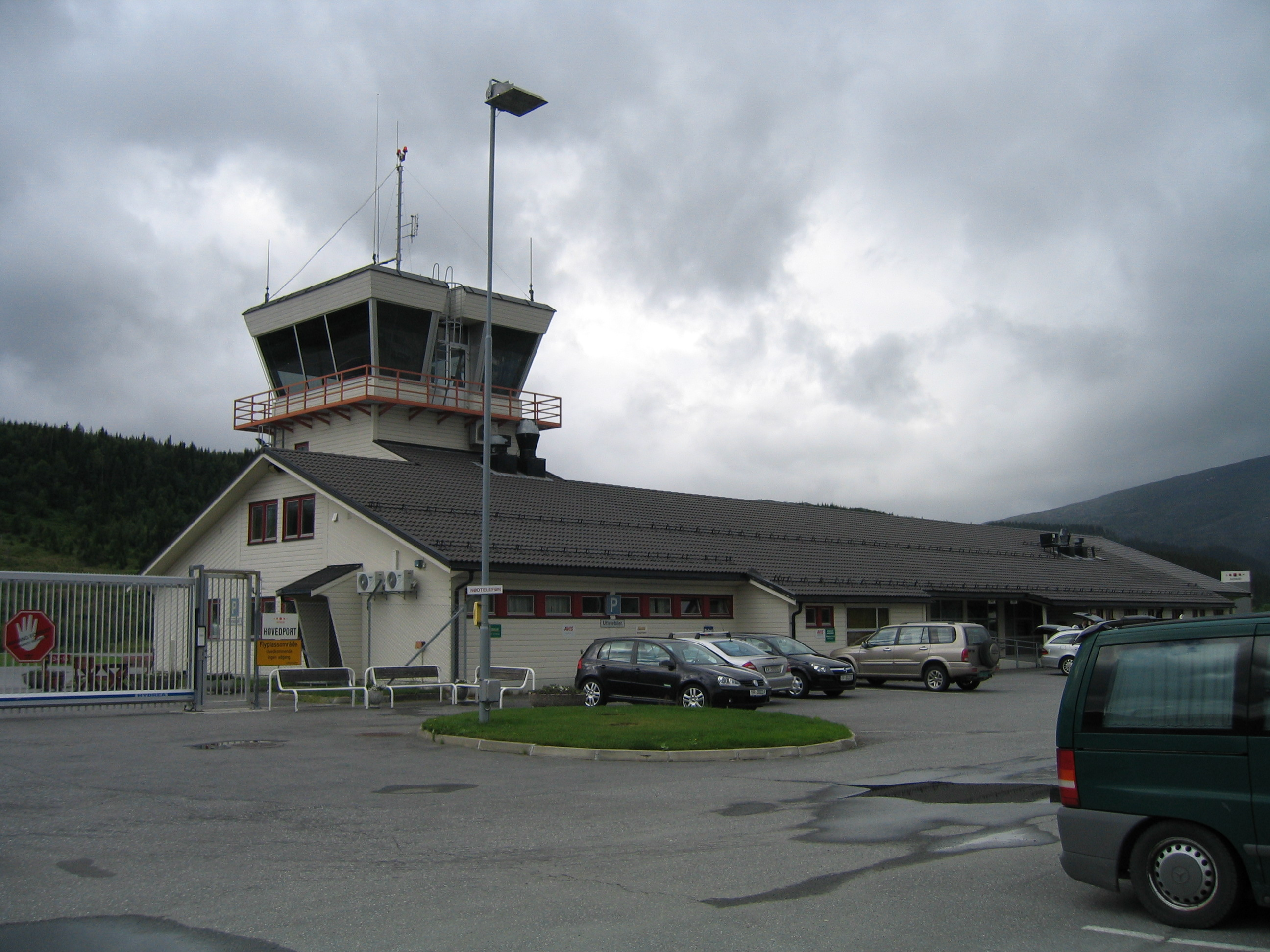
- IATA: MJF; ICAO: ENMS

Summary
- Airport type: Public
- Owner/Operator: Avinor
- Serves: Mosjøen
- Location: Kjærstad, Vefsn Municipality, Norway
- Elevation AMSL: 73 m / 240 ft
- Coordinates: 65°47′02.39″N 013°12′53.69″E
- Website: avinor.no

Map
- Location in Norway

Runways
Direction	Length		Surface
Direction	m	ft	Surface
16/34	1,019	3,343	Asphalt

Statistics (2014)
- Passengers: 61,480
- Aircraft movements: 6,058
- Cargo (tonnes): 16

Mosjøen Airport (Norwegian: Mosjøen lufthavn, IATA: MJF, ICAO: ENMS) is a regional airport serving the town of Mosjøen in Vefsn Municipality in Nordland county, Norway. In 2014, Mosjøen Airport had 61,480 passengers. It is owned and operated by the state-owned Avinor.

== Service ==
The airport is served by Widerøe with Dash 8 aircraft connecting the community to the nearby towns of Bodø and Trondheim. The routes are operated on public service obligation with the Ministry of Transport and Communications. The runway is too short for flights with enough fuel to reach Oslo.

== History ==
The airport was opened in 1987 as part of the last group of regional airports to be built in Norway.

In 2002, the Ministry of Transport launched an idea of merging the three airports serving Northern Helgeland: Mosjøen Airport, Sandnessjøen Airport, and Mo i Rana Airport into one new airport with a large enough runway to fly Airbus A320/Boeing 737 aircraft directly to Oslo, and make it unnecessary to operate subsidized regional aircraft to Helgeland. The Korgfjell Tunnel opened in 2005 created a reliable and fast road between Mosjøen and Mo i Rana. A better road to Sandnessjøen (Toven Tunnel) was opened 2014.

A location was selected at Drevjadalen in Vefsn Municipality, about 15 kilometres (9.3 mi) north of Mosjøen, which is 55 kilometres (34 mi) from Sandnessjøen and 70 kilometres (43 mi) from Mo i Rana. Meteorological tests performed by Avinor showed however that the area had too much fog to serve as an airport. As of 2007, the idea of a new airport at this location is abandoned by both Avinor and the Ministry of Transport.

Instead of this plan, a decision was made in 2013 to build a larger airport near Mo i Rana Airport, Røssvoll which would be called Mo i Rana Airport, Fagerlia.

== Airlines and destinations ==
Airlines	Destinations
Widerøe	Bodø, Mo i Rana, Trondheim

== Statistics ==
Annual passenger traffic
Year	Passengers	% Change
2025	74,639	▲10.7%
2024	67,434	▼ -5.3%
2023	71,223	▲8.6%
2022	65,569	▲12.6%
2021	58,219	▲36.7%
2020	42,593	▼ -38.3%
2019	69,055	▼ -1.5%
2018	70,094	▼ -5.2%
2017	73,919	▼ -11.5%
2016	83,518	▲1.3%
2015	82,451	

== Ground transportation ==
The airport is located 10 minutes out of town. There is no bus service to the airport, but taxis are available.
