= Kjærstad =

Kjærstad is a Norwegian surname. Notable people with the surname include:

- Håvard Kjærstad (born 1947), Norwegian businessperson
- Jan Kjærstad (born 1953), Norwegian author
