= Mosjøen =

Town in Vefsn, Norway

- Town/City
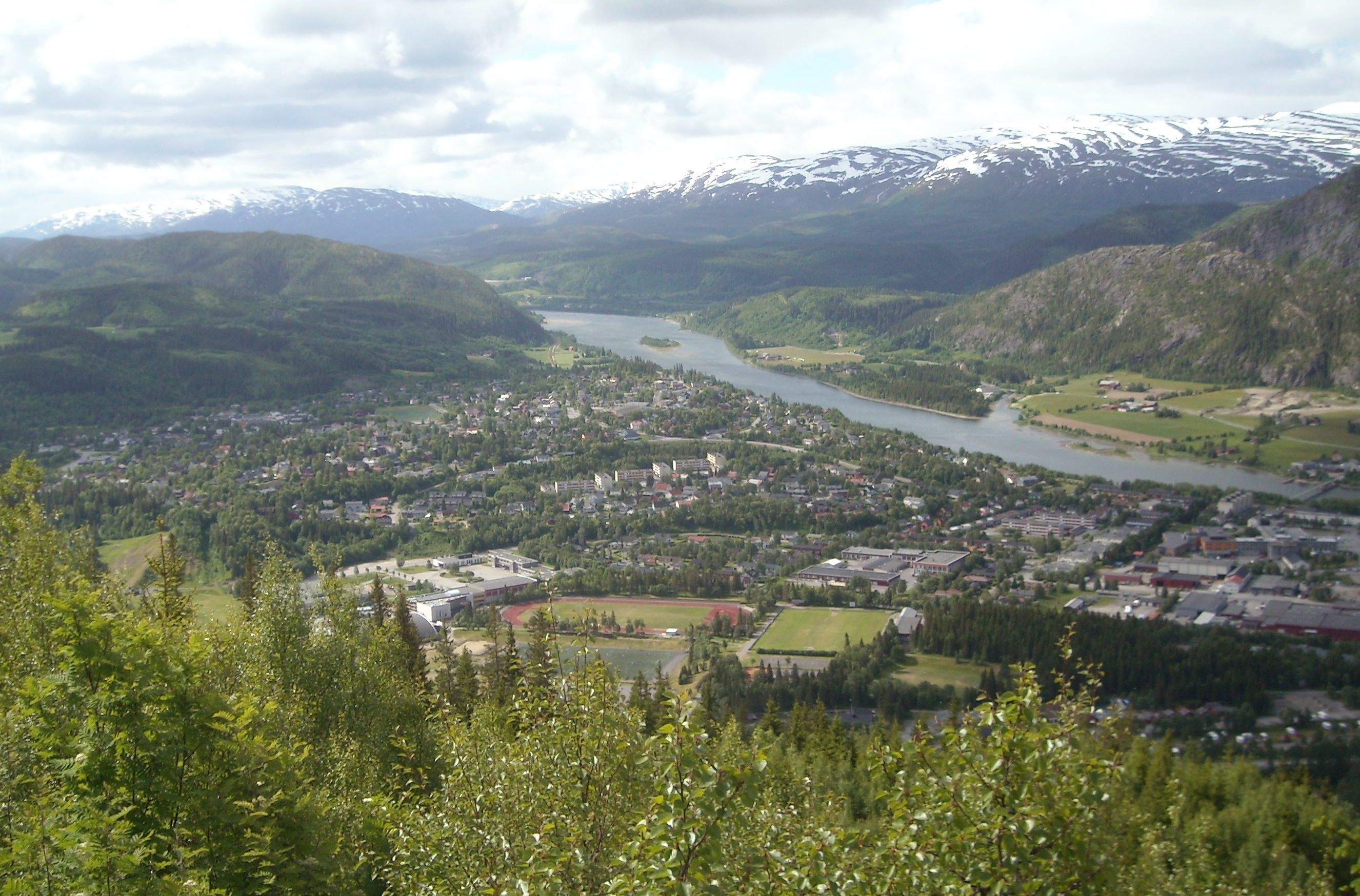
- View of southern parts of Mosjøen
- Interactive map of Mosjøen
- Location within Nordland Location within Norway
- Coordinates: 65.8370°N 13.1913°E
- Country: Norway
- Region: Northern Norway
- County: Nordland
- District: Helgeland
- Municipality: Vefsn Municipality
- Established as
- Ladested: 1875-1962
- Town (By): 1998

Area
  - Total: 6.55 km^{2} (2.53 sq mi)
- Elevation: 5 m (16 ft)

Population (2024)
  - Total: 10,059
  - Density: 1,536/km^{2} (3,980/sq mi)
- Demonym: Mosjøværing
- Time zone: UTC+01:00 (CET)
  - Summer (DST): UTC+02:00 (CEST)
- Post Code: 8651–8665 Mosjøen
- Former municipality
- Mosjøen ladested
- Coat of arms

- Location within Nordland Location within Norway
- Country: Norway
- County: Nordland
- District: Helgeland
- Established: 1 Jan 1876
  - Preceded by: Vefsn Municipality
- Disestablished: 1 Jan 1962
  - Succeeded by: Vefsn Municipality
- Administrative centre: Mosjøen

Government
  - Mayor (1957-1962): Einar Jensen (Ap)

Area (upon dissolution)
  - Total: 2.4 km^{2} (0.93 sq mi)
  - Rank: #697 in Norway

Population (1961)
  - Total: 4,600
  - Rank: #181 in Norway
  - Density: 1,917/km^{2} (4,970/sq mi)
  - Change (10 years): ▲ +37.4%

Official language
  - Norwegian form: Neutral
- Time zone: UTC+01:00 (CET)
  - Summer (DST): UTC+02:00 (CEST)
- ISO 3166 code: NO-1802

Mosjøen (Norwegian; pronounced [ˈmùːʂøːn]) or Mussere (Southern Sami) is a town in Vefsn Municipality in Nordland county, Norway. Mosjøen is the oldest town in the Helgeland region, with only the town of Bodø being older within Nordland county. The town is also the administrative centre of Vefsn Municipality. The old village of Mosjøen was declared a ladested in 1875. It was also a town-municipality (bykommune) from 1875 until 1961 when it was merged into Vefsn Municipality, losing its status as a town (ladested). It is also a former garrison town and customs place. After a change in law during the 1990s, the urban area of Mosjøen was declared to be a town once again in 1998. People from Mosjøen are referred to using the demonym "mosjøværing". The 6.55-square-kilometre (1,620-acre) town has a population (2024) of 10,059 and a population density of 1,536 inhabitants per square kilometre (3,980/sq mi).

Together with the other regional towns of Mo i Rana and Narvik, Mosjøen is one of the industrial towns in Nordland county. Owned by Alcoa, Mosjøen Aluminum Plant is among the biggest in Europe, and is traditionally the town's cornerstone. Additionally, the town's business sector includes trade, crafts, banking, transportation, and tourism. The town attracts customers from the entire region.

Mosjøen is a transport hub in Helgeland. From Mosjøen, it is 71 kilometres (44 miles) to the town of Sandnessjøen in the west, 87 kilometres (54 miles) to the town of Mo i Rana in the north, and 160 kilometres (99 miles) to the town of Brønnøysund in the south. Furthermore, the road distance is 318 km (198 miles) to the town of Bodø and 393 km (244 miles) to the city of Trondheim. The European route E6 highway runs through the town. There are daily departures from Mosjøen Bus Central, from Mosjøen Railway Station on the Nordland Line, and from Mosjøen Airport south of the town. There are both public and private quays in Mosjøen. The town's harbour is among the largest in Northern Norway.

In terms of secondary and adult education, Mosjøen exercises both local and regional functions. Offering general (including music), vocational, and agricultural lines, Mosjøen High School also receives students from rural municipalities surrounding the town and from other regions of Nordland. Vefsn Folk High School lies in Mosjøen, while Sandvik Folk High School is located north of it. The town has got a department of the Open University. Many bigger events for children and youth take place in Mosjøen, among others Toppen International Summer Music School and The Kippermoen Cup.

Mosjøen is known for Sjøgata: Northern Norway's longest cluster of 19th-century wooden houses and piers. Other tourist attractions include Dolstad Church from 1735, the award-winning Town Park from 1905, and the aluminum plant.

== Etymology ==
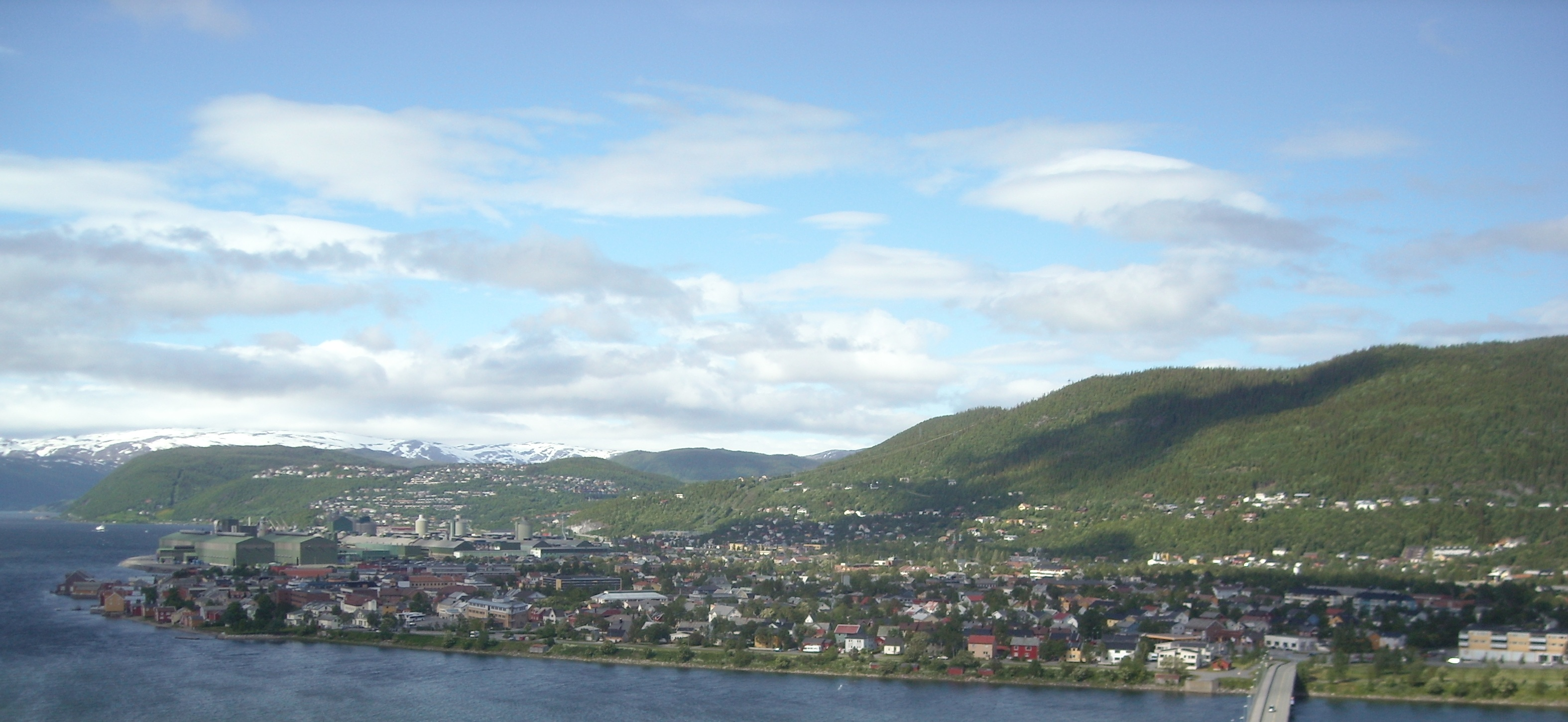
Downtown as well as northern and north-eastern parts of Mosjøen

The town is named after the old Mo farm (Old Norse: Móar) the town was built up on the outskirts of the large farm. The first element is derived from the word móar which is the plural form of mór which means "moorland". The last element is sjøen (Old Norse: sjór which means "sea" or "seaside". Mosjøen, therefor means "the sea(side) belonging to Mo". In other words, it was a place where the farmers of Mo had their boats and boatsheds. Earlier spellings are Moesøen in the 18th century and Mosøen in the 19th century.

== History ==
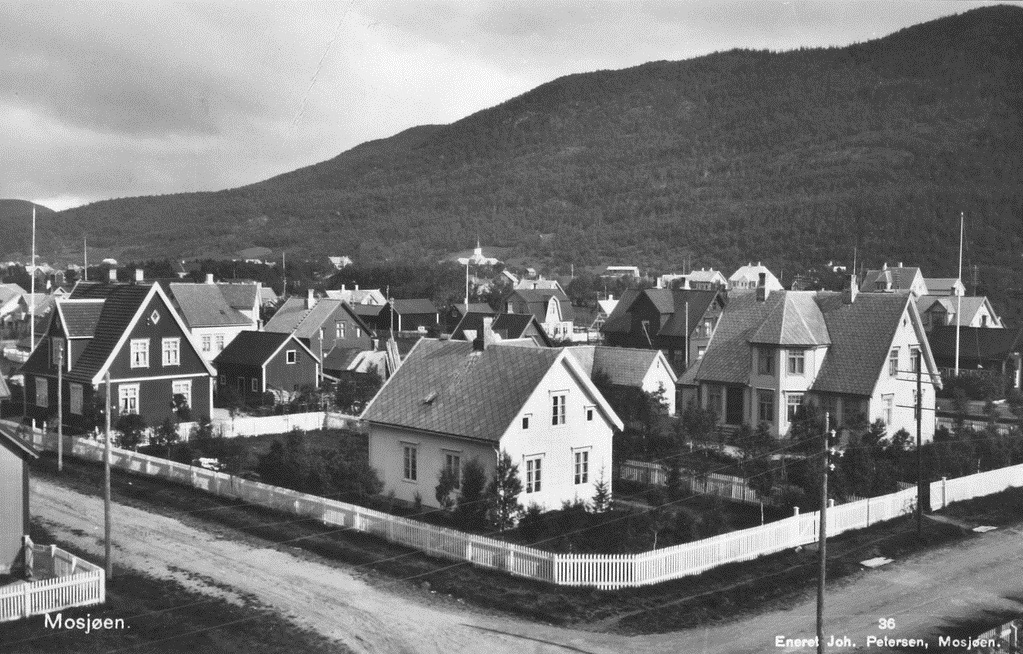
Spanning 300 years, Mosjøen's architecture includes villas of the early 20th century

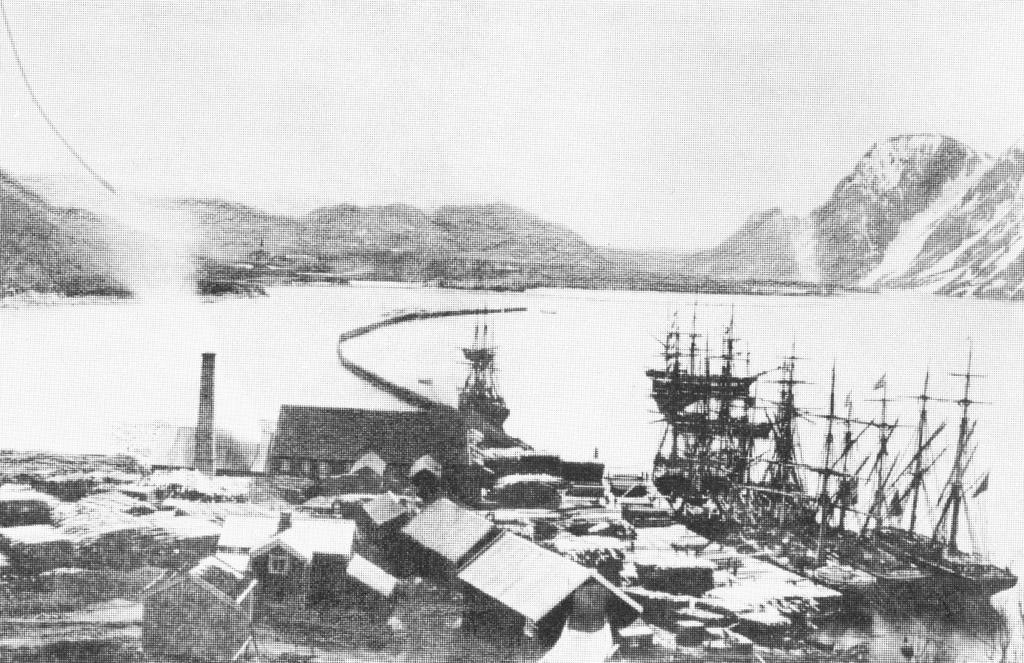
The English sawmills in 1870. As Mosjøen grew wealthier and wealthier, surrounding forests were depleted

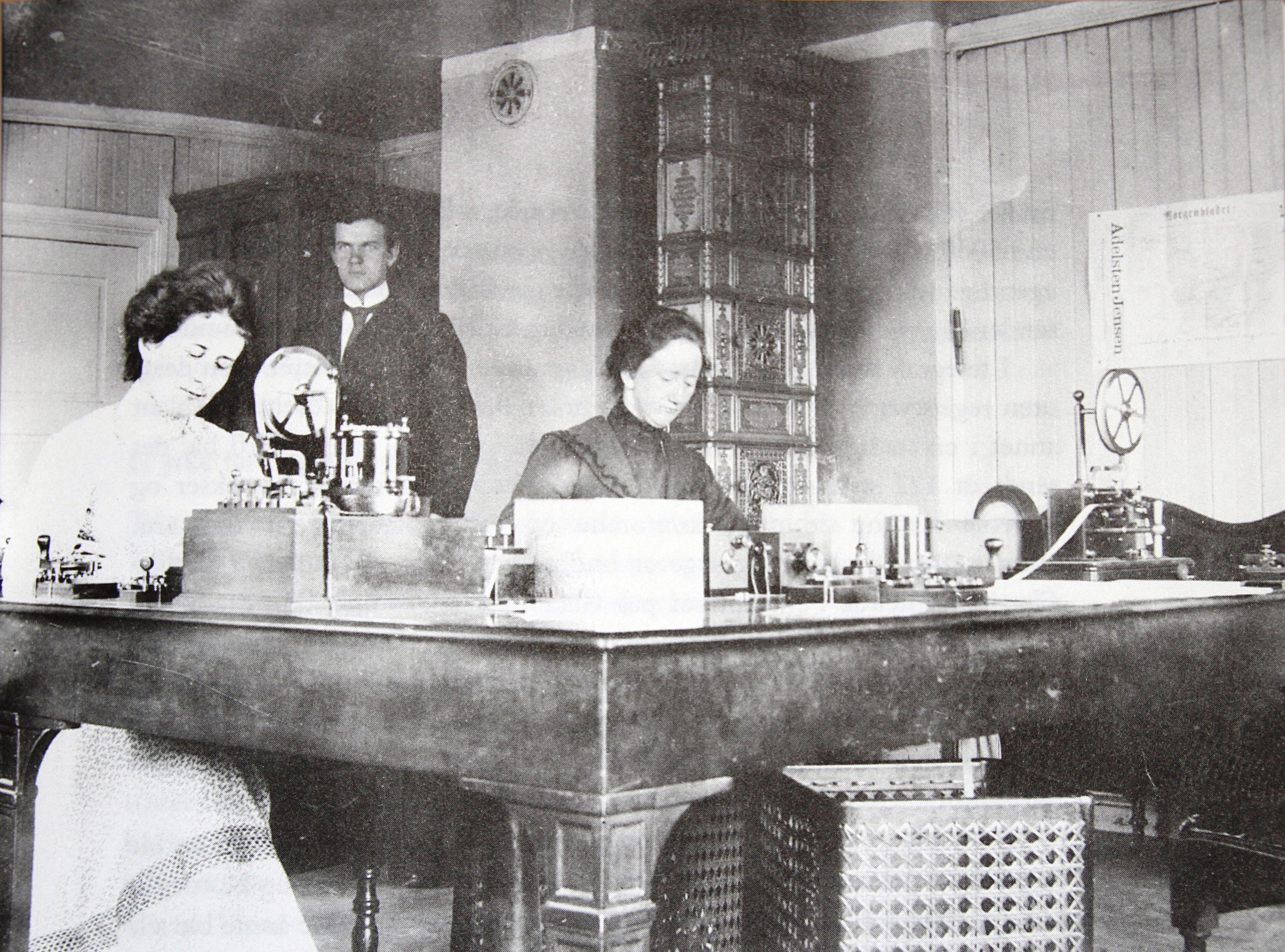
Mosjøen's telegraph station in 1906. The town was central for infrastructure and communications in Helgeland

Mentioned in Aslak Bolt's cadastre of the 15th century, Mo is a medieval farm with a history at least dating to the Viking Age. Mosjøen's own history starts in the early modern period. Mosjøen was populated by 1600. The earliest inhabitant known by name is Svein Beachdweller, who lived there together with his wife and daughters in 1660. In the 17th and early 18th century, especially following the 1645 Treaty of Brömsebro, several inhabitants of Jemtland escaped to Trøndelag and to Nordland. Many of them came to the Vefsna river valley (in present-day Vefsn Municipality), including to the Mosjøen area. In the 18th century, Mosjøen as a settlement for nonagrarian occupations started to materialise. For example, the regional executioner resided there temporarily. As did a handful of craftsmen and public officials.

From the late 16th century until the 1820s, Mo was possessed by the Mo family: wealthy farmers as well as skippers and merchants who contributed to Mosjøen's gradual expansion. In 1794, a member of the family received royal privilege to establish a trading post in Mosjøen.

In the 1860s, a group of Englishmen—the 'salmon lords'—established The North of Europe Land & Mining Company, introducing the first industrial period in Mosjøen. Sawmill industry created 'Klondike conditions': People came from everywhere in order to get a job, to trade, and so on, and salaries were relatively high.

On 4 April 1874, King Oscar II decided to grant ladested (town) status to Mosjøen effective on 1 January 1875. As a ladested, Mosjøen now had the privilege to export goods directly to foreign countries. As a new town, it had the right to self-government, so it was separated from Vefsn Municipality to become a separate municipality on 1 January 1876. Initially, the new town had 379 residents. In 1939, a small adjoining area of Vefsn was transferred into the town of Mosjøen. The Cinema Museum in London holds excellent film of the area in 1931 in its collection (ref HMO321)

As the biggest and most important, central town in the Helgeland region, Mosjøen became northern headquarters of the Nazi German occupiers between 1940 and 1945. After the war in 1945, Mosjøen entered its second industrial period. Among several industrial establishments was Mosjøen Aluminum Plant.

Mosjøen's coat of arms was granted by King Olav V on 25 March 1960. Composed by sculptor Arthur Gustavsson, it is blazoned Sable, a cock Argent. The cock is traditionally equipped with red beak, wattles, comb, and claws: the so-called colour of armament. The cock represents watchfulness and fighting spirit. After the merger with Vefsn Municipality in 1962, the same coat of arms was adopted for the newly enlarged Vefsn Municipality.

During the 1960s, there were many municipal mergers across Norway due to the work of the Schei Committee. On 1 January 1962, a major municipal merger took place. The town of Mosjøen (population: 4,628) was merged with Vefsn Municipality (population: 5,358), Drevja Municipality (population: 1,001), and Elsfjord Municipality (population: 920), creating a new municipality called Vefsn. Upon merging, Mosjøen lost its status as a town.

In 1998 (after a change in the national law regarding towns), the municipal council of Vefsn Municipality declared Mosjøen to have the formal status as a town once again.

=== Municipal self-government (1875–1962) ===
Mosjøen was a self-governing municipality from 1875 until 1962. During that time, Mosjøen Municipality was responsible for primary education (through 10th grade), outpatient health services, senior citizen services, welfare and other social services, zoning, economic development, and municipal roads and utilities. The municipality was governed by a municipal council of directly elected representatives. The mayor was indirectly elected by a vote of the municipal council.

==== Municipal council ====
The municipal council (Bystyre) of Mosjøen Municipality was made up of 29 representatives that were elected to four year terms. The tables below show the current and historical composition of the council by political party.

Mosjøen bystyre 1959–1963
Party name (in Norwegian)	Number of representatives
Labour Party (Arbeiderpartiet)	19
Conservative Party (Høyre)	5
Christian Democratic Party (Kristelig Folkeparti)	1
Liberal Party (Venstre)	4
Total number of members:	29
Note: On 1 January 1962, Mosjøen Municipality became part of Vefsn Municipality.

Mosjøen bystyre 1955–1959
Party name (in Norwegian)	Number of representatives
Labour Party (Arbeiderpartiet)	18
Conservative Party (Høyre)	5
Christian Democratic Party (Kristelig Folkeparti)	1
Liberal Party (Venstre)	5
Total number of members:	29

Mosjøen bystyre 1951–1955
Party name (in Norwegian)	Number of representatives
Labour Party (Arbeiderpartiet)	16
Conservative Party (Høyre)	5
Communist Party (Kommunistiske Parti)	1
Liberal Party (Venstre)	6
Total number of members:	28

Mosjøen bystyre 1947–1951
Party name (in Norwegian)	Number of representatives
Labour Party (Arbeiderpartiet)	10
Conservative Party (Høyre)	3
Communist Party (Kommunistiske Parti)	2
Liberal Party (Venstre)	5
Total number of members:	20

Mosjøen bystyre 1945–1947
Party name (in Norwegian)	Number of representatives
Labour Party (Arbeiderpartiet)	11
Communist Party (Kommunistiske Parti)	2
Liberal Party (Venstre)	4
Local List(s) (Lokale lister)	3
Total number of members:	20

Mosjøen bystyre 1937–1941*
Party name (in Norwegian)	Number of representatives
Labour Party (Arbeiderpartiet)	11
Liberal Party (Venstre)	4
Joint List(s) of Non-Socialist Parties (Borgerlige Felleslister)	5
Total number of members:	20
Note: Due to the German occupation of Norway during World War II, no elections were held for new municipal councils until after the war ended in 1945.

Mosjøen bystyre 1934–1937
Party name (in Norwegian)	Number of representatives
Labour Party (Arbeiderpartiet)	9
Liberal Party (Venstre)	4
Local List(s) (Lokale lister)	1
Non-Socialist Group (Borgerlig Samling)	6
Total number of members:	20

==== Mayors ====
The mayor (Norwegian: ordfører) of Mosjøen Municipality was the political leader of the municipality and the chairperson of the municipal council. Here is a list of people who held this position:

- 1876–1877: Andreas Christian Bech Jürgensen
- 1878–1879: Johan Jakob Johannessen
- 1880–1882: Andreas Christian Bech Jürgensen
- 1883–1887: Ole Sivert Elnan (V)
- 1888–1889: Andreas Fredrik Peter Schroeter
- 1890–1890: Ole Sivert Elnan (V)
- 1891–1891: Andreas Fredrik Peter Schroeter
- 1891–1891: Ole Sivert Elnan (V)
- 1892–1895: Christian Fredrik Nergaard Havig (V)
- 1896–1898: Ole Sivert Elnan (V)
- 1899–1901: Erik Bathen (H)
- 1902–1903: Ole Sivert Elnan (V)
- 1904–1908: Erik Bathen (H)
- 1909–1909: Ole Andreas Fellingfors (H)
- 1910–1910: Erik Bathen (H)
- 1910–1910: Ole Andreas Fellingfors (H)
- 1911–1913: Mathias Løkke
- 1914–1916: Thomas Riis
- 1917–1917: Anton Solbraa
- 1918–1921: Kristian Tustervatn (V)
- 1922–1923: Ole Tobias Olsen
- 1924–1924: Otto Bugge (Ap)
- 1925–1925: Ole Tobias Olsen
- 1926–1926: Kristian Tustervatn (V)
- 1927–1931: Harald Robert Barth (LL)
- 1932–1934: Hans Olaus Jarnæs (LL)
- 1935–1935: Harald Robert Barth (LL)
- 1936–1937: Hans Olaus Jarnæs (LL)
- 1938–1941: Carl Wilhelm Johansen (Ap)
- 1941–1942: Carl August Eliassen (NS)
- 1943–1945: Halfdan Sundlo (NS)
- 1945–1945: Carl Wilhelm Johansen (Ap)
- 1945–1945: Kristian Karlsen (Ap)
- 1946–1947: Johan Kristian Lian (Ap)
- 1948–1949: Ole Ferdinand Andersen (Ap)
- 1950–1951: Ole Jakob Wika (Ap)
- 1952–1957: Ole Ferdinand Andersen (Ap)
- 1957–1962: Einar Jensen (Ap)

== Industry and business ==
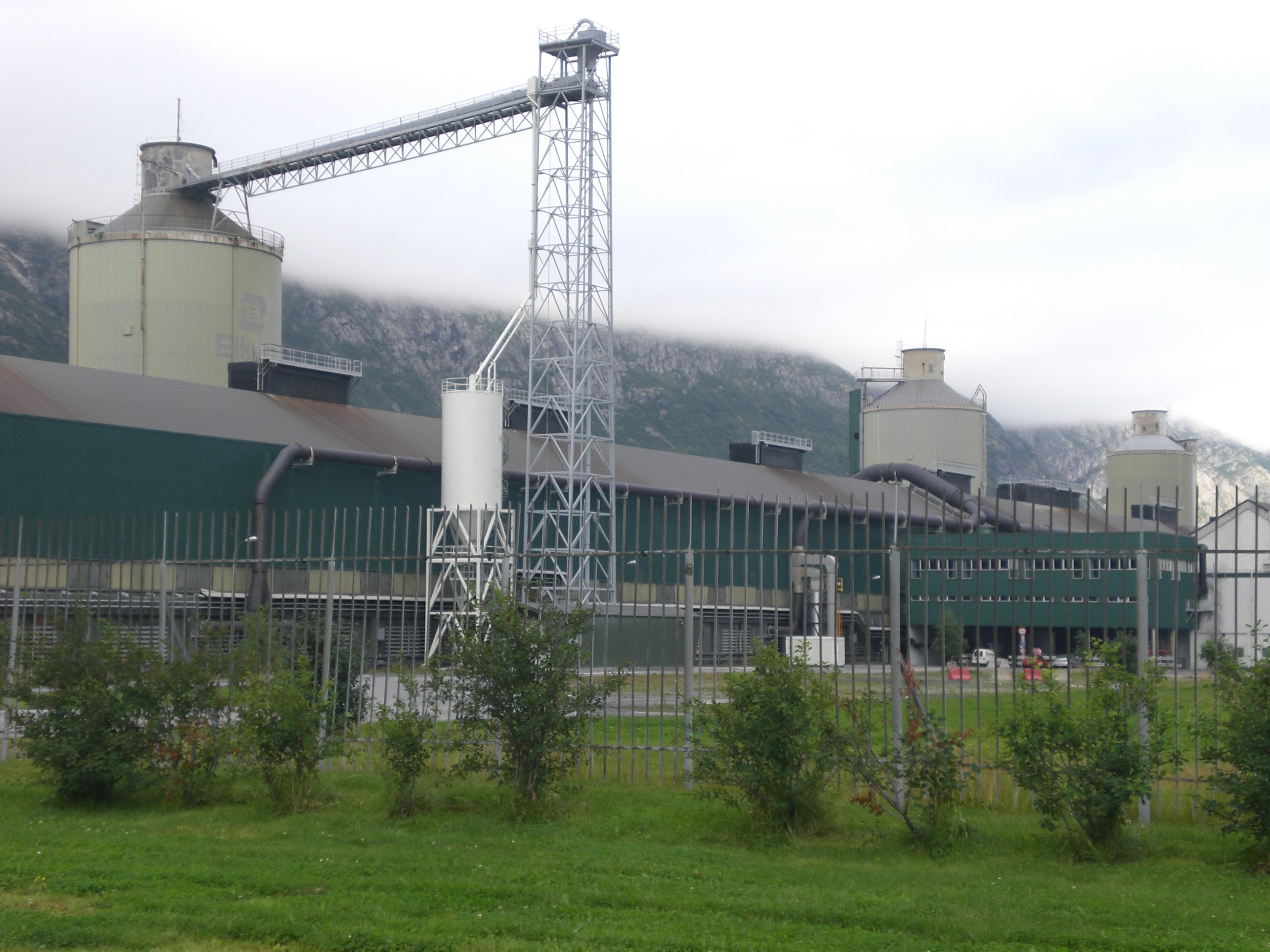
Part of Mosjøen Aluminum Plant

Mosjøen is one of the industrial towns in Nordland county. Especially important is the Mosjøen Aluminum Plant, owned by Alcoa.

Mosjøen's business sector contains both traditional and modern companies as well as a wide spectre of branches, including trade, crafts, banking, transportation, and tourism. The town is a commercial centre in the region, attracting customers from smaller neighbouring towns and from rural municipalities.

== Transportation ==
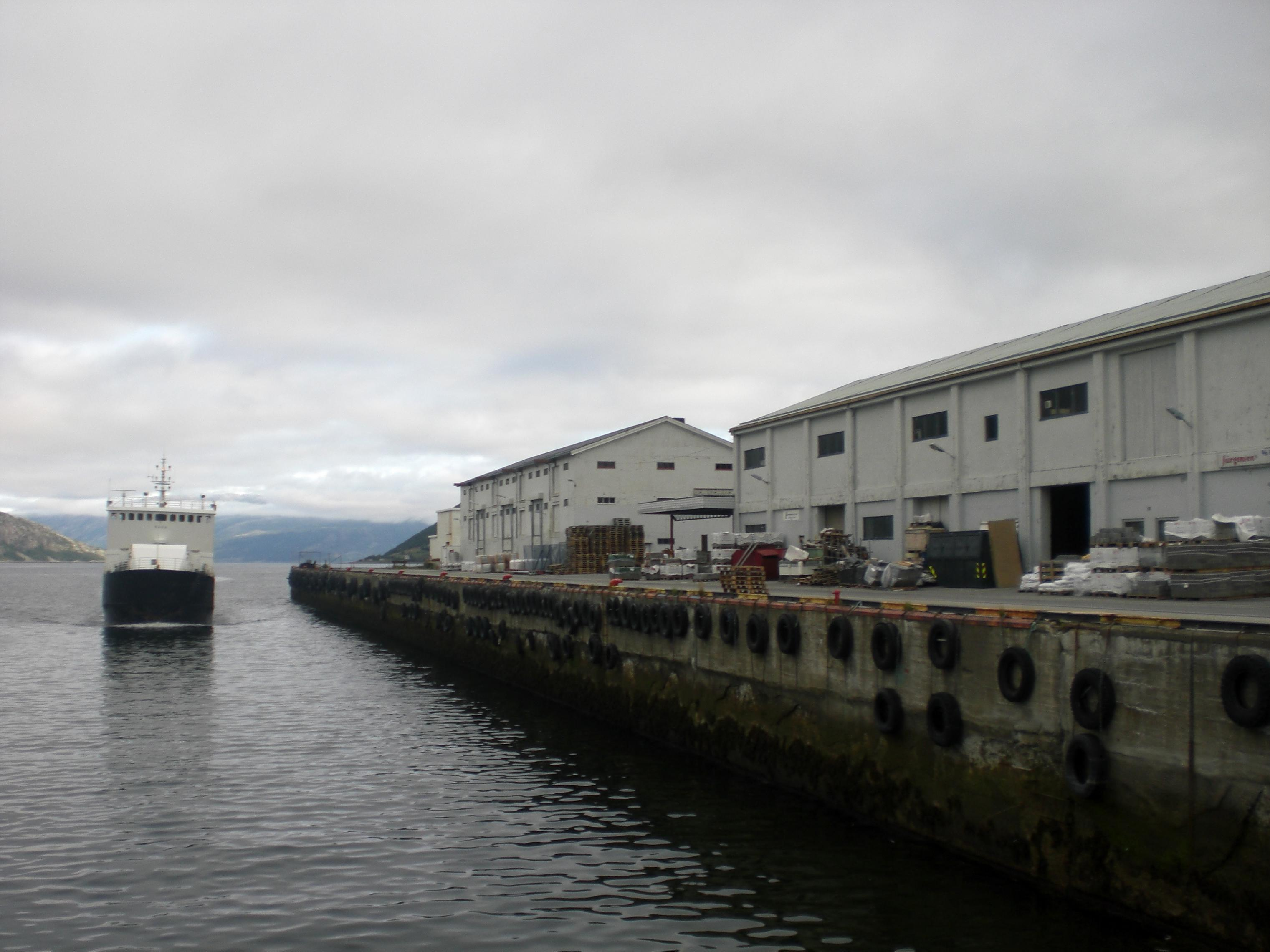
Part of the harbour

As a transport hub in Helgeland, Mosjøen connects to the towns of Sandnessjøen 71 kilometres (44 miles) to the west, Mo i Rana 87 kilometres (54 miles) to the north, and Brønnøysund 160 kilometres (99 miles) to the south by road. The European route E6 between Trondheim 393 kilometres (244 miles) to the south and the county capital Bodø 318 kilometres (198 miles) to the north runs through Mosjøen.

Mosjøen is also accessible by airplane, by train, and by ship. Mosjøen is served by Mosjøen Airport, Kjærstad, which is located five minutes by car south of the town. Mosjøen Station on the Nordland Line has daily departures for Trondheim in the south and for the Bodø in the north. A smaller commuter rail operates between Trofors and Mo i Rana.

Encompassing both private and public quays, Mosjøen's harbour is the biggest port in Northern Norway. Mosjøen Aluminum Plant has got its own port.

== Tourism ==
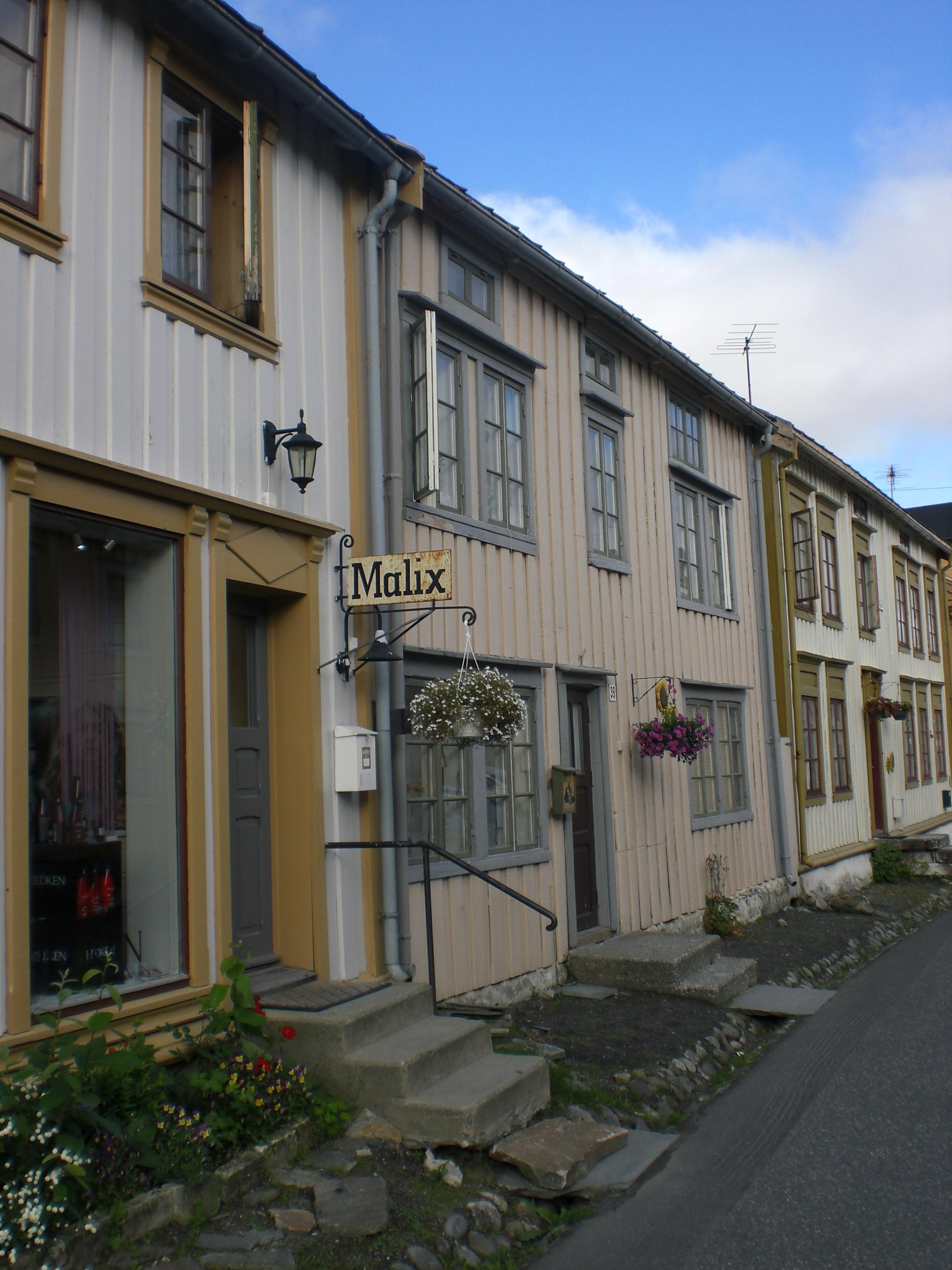
Part of Sjøgata

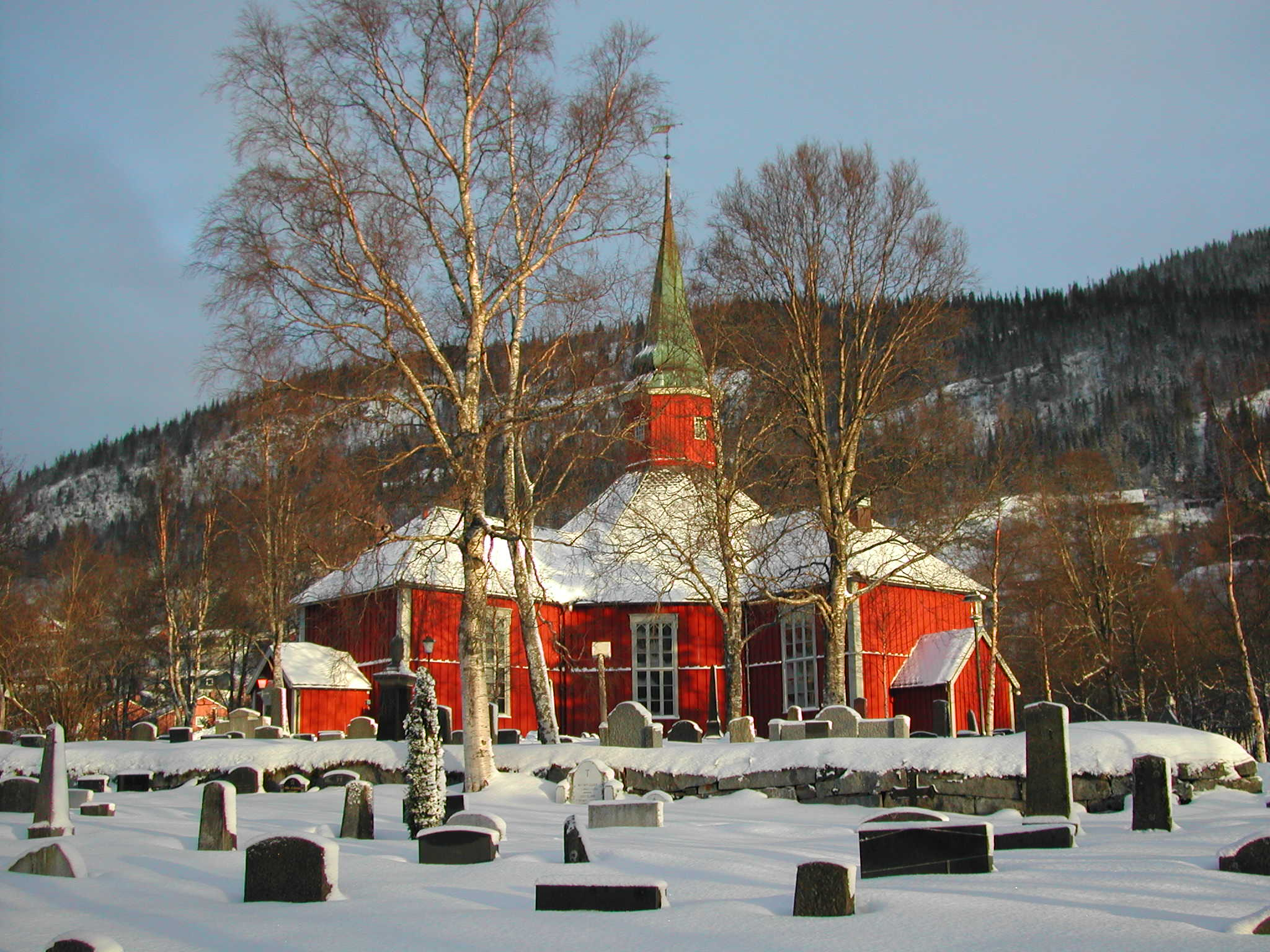
Dolstad Church from 1735

The following are popular sightseeing spots:

- Sjøgata, a historic and picturesque street containing the largest concentration of 19th-century wooden buildings in Northern Norway.
- Fru Haugans Hotel, established in 1794 and today the oldest hotel in Northern Norway.
- Dolstad Church, established in 1735.
- The Town Park, established ca. 1900 and regarded as one of the finest public parks in Norway.

== Geography ==
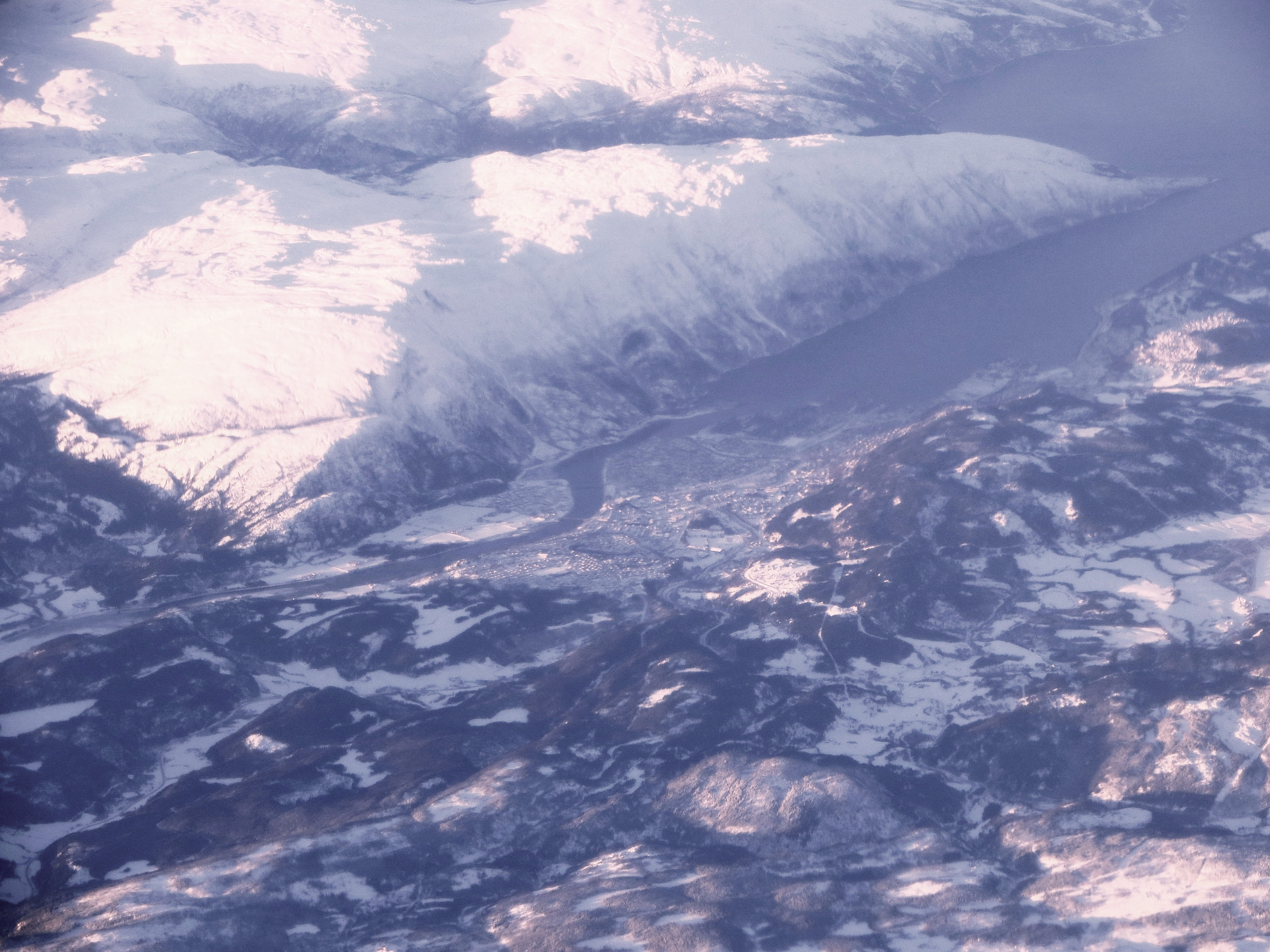
Topographic situation

=== Topography ===
Mosjøen is situated in the lower part of the Vefsn Valley, where the Vefsna and Skjerva rivers flow into the Vefsnfjord. Downtown Mosjøen lies on a flat moorland between these two rivers. Moreover, the town is surrounded by mountains and hills, which are mainly vegetated. Standing immediately west of the town, the 814-metre (2,671 ft) tall mountain Øyfjellet dominates the town's landscape.

=== Climate ===
Mosjøen is located about 100 kilometres (62 mi) south of the Arctic Circle, and the town has an untypical wet and mild boreal climate (Köppen: Dfc), with winter as the wettest season. The town has mild summers and moderately cold winters, but is mild compared to other places on similar latitudes due to its proximity to the Atlantic Ocean. Situated at the head of a relatively narrow fjord, Mosjøen is not as mild in winter as places on the outer seaboard, but has slightly warmer summers. On 27 July 2019, Mosjøen recorded a high of 35.0 °C (95.0 °F), which is the warmest temperature officially recorded in Nordland and Northern Norway. Mosjøen receives a large amount of precipitation, particularly in autumn and early winter, and usually has substantial amounts of snow on the ground from late November or early December until mid-April. Its temperatures are fairly similar to that of Anchorage, Alaska. The weather station is located at the airport, about 7 kilometres (4.3 mi) further inland from Mosjøen. The town itself, located at the shores of the fjord, will typically have slightly warmer lows than the airport. The record low is from January 2010. Despite being south of the Arctic Circle, Mosjøen experiences midnight sun from 16 June to 26 June due to atmospheric refraction, but has no polar night: on the December solstice, Mosjøen has just under three hours of daylight.

Climate data for Mosjøen Airport 1991-2020 (72 m, extremes 2002-2025)
Month	Jan	Feb	Mar	Apr	May	Jun	Jul	Aug	Sep	Oct	Nov	Dec	Year
Record high °C (°F)	10.2 (50.4)	11.2 (52.2)	12.9 (55.2)	19.4 (66.9)	29.7 (85.5)	30.7 (87.3)	35.0 (95.0)	29.7 (85.5)	25.3 (77.5)	18.5 (65.3)	12.8 (55.0)	9.9 (49.8)	35.0 (95.0)
Mean daily maximum °C (°F)	−2.3 (27.9)	−1.5 (29.3)	2.3 (36.1)	7.1 (44.8)	11.7 (53.1)	15.6 (60.1)	19.3 (66.7)	18.1 (64.6)	13.4 (56.1)	7.0 (44.6)	1.2 (34.2)	−0.8 (30.6)	7.6 (45.7)
Daily mean °C (°F)	−3.8 (25.2)	−4.3 (24.3)	−1.8 (28.8)	2.6 (36.7)	6.9 (44.4)	11.1 (52.0)	14.7 (58.5)	13.1 (55.6)	8.9 (48.0)	3.3 (37.9)	−0.6 (30.9)	−3.3 (26.1)	3.9 (39.0)
Mean daily minimum °C (°F)	−6.4 (20.5)	−6.4 (20.5)	−5.3 (22.5)	−1.0 (30.2)	3.0 (37.4)	7.3 (45.1)	10.4 (50.7)	9.1 (48.4)	6.2 (43.2)	1.5 (34.7)	−2.3 (27.9)	−5.1 (22.8)	0.9 (33.7)
Record low °C (°F)	−28.5 (−19.3)	−26.3 (−15.3)	−24.2 (−11.6)	−13.4 (7.9)	−5.3 (22.5)	−1.0 (30.2)	1.9 (35.4)	−0.9 (30.4)	−5.3 (22.5)	−13.4 (7.9)	−23.8 (−10.8)	−24.9 (−12.8)	−28.5 (−19.3)
Average precipitation mm (inches)	167.6 (6.60)	132.1 (5.20)	161.0 (6.34)	91.8 (3.61)	54.0 (2.13)	64.2 (2.53)	76.8 (3.02)	89.2 (3.51)	128.4 (5.06)	140.1 (5.52)	136.8 (5.39)	150.5 (5.93)	1,392.5 (54.84)
Source 1: Norwegian Meteorological Institute
Source 2: Weatheronline climate robot

Climate data for Mosjøen 1961-90
Month	Jan	Feb	Mar	Apr	May	Jun	Jul	Aug	Sep	Oct	Nov	Dec	Year
Mean daily maximum °C (°F)	−5 (23)	−4 (25)	0 (32)	5 (41)	10 (50)	13 (55)	18 (64)	17 (63)	12 (54)	7 (45)	−3 (27)	−6 (21)	5 (42)
Daily mean °C (°F)	−5.7 (21.7)	−4.5 (23.9)	−1.6 (29.1)	2.4 (36.3)	7.6 (45.7)	11.6 (52.9)	13.4 (56.1)	12.8 (55.0)	8.6 (47.5)	4.6 (40.3)	−1.4 (29.5)	−4.2 (24.4)	3.6 (38.5)
Mean daily minimum °C (°F)	−9 (16)	−10 (14)	−8 (18)	0 (32)	4 (39)	7 (45)	12 (54)	10 (50)	5 (41)	2 (36)	−7 (19)	−10 (14)	0 (32)
Average precipitation mm (inches)	186 (7.3)	135 (5.3)	150 (5.9)	99 (3.9)	79 (3.1)	80 (3.1)	100 (3.9)	116 (4.6)	191 (7.5)	230 (9.1)	181 (7.1)	198 (7.8)	1,745 (68.6)

== Friendship towns ==
Town	Country	Start	Reason
Lycksele	Sweden	1965	Old trade connections. Besides, Lycksele was first in Lapland to become a town.
Gornji Milanovac	Serbia	28 Sep 1975	During WW2, at least 425 Serbian prisoners at Osen Camp, Vefsn, were killed.
Volkhov	Russia	16 Jun 1992	Established in 1932, Kirov was Russia's first aluminum plant.
Taksony	Hungary	4 Sep 2000	
