= Gildeskål =

Gildeskål may refer to:

== Places ==
- Gildeskål Municipality, a municipality in Nordland county, Norway
- Gildeskål (village), a small village in Gildeskål Municipality in Nordland county, Norway
- Gildeskål Church, a church in Gildeskål Municipality in Nordland county, Norway
- Old Gildeskål Church, a church in Gildeskål Municipality in Nordland county, Norway
