= Sørfinnset =

Village in Gildeskål Municipality, Norway

- Village
- Interactive map of Sørfinnset
- Location within Nordland Location within Norway
- Coordinates: 66.9779°N 13.9831°E
- Country: Norway
- Region: Northern Norway
- County: Nordland
- District: Salten
- Municipality: Gildeskål Municipality
- Elevation: 26 m (85 ft)
- Time zone: UTC+01:00 (CET)
  - Summer (DST): UTC+02:00 (CEST)
- Post Code: 8140 Inndyr

Sørfinnset is a village in Gildeskål Municipality in Nordland county, Norway. It is located on the mainland, south of the village of Inndyr and east of the village of Storvik. Norwegian County Road 17 passes by 2 kilometres (1.2 mi) south of the village. Sørfjorden Chapel is located in the village.
