= Inndyr =

Village in Gildeskål Municipality, Norway

- Village
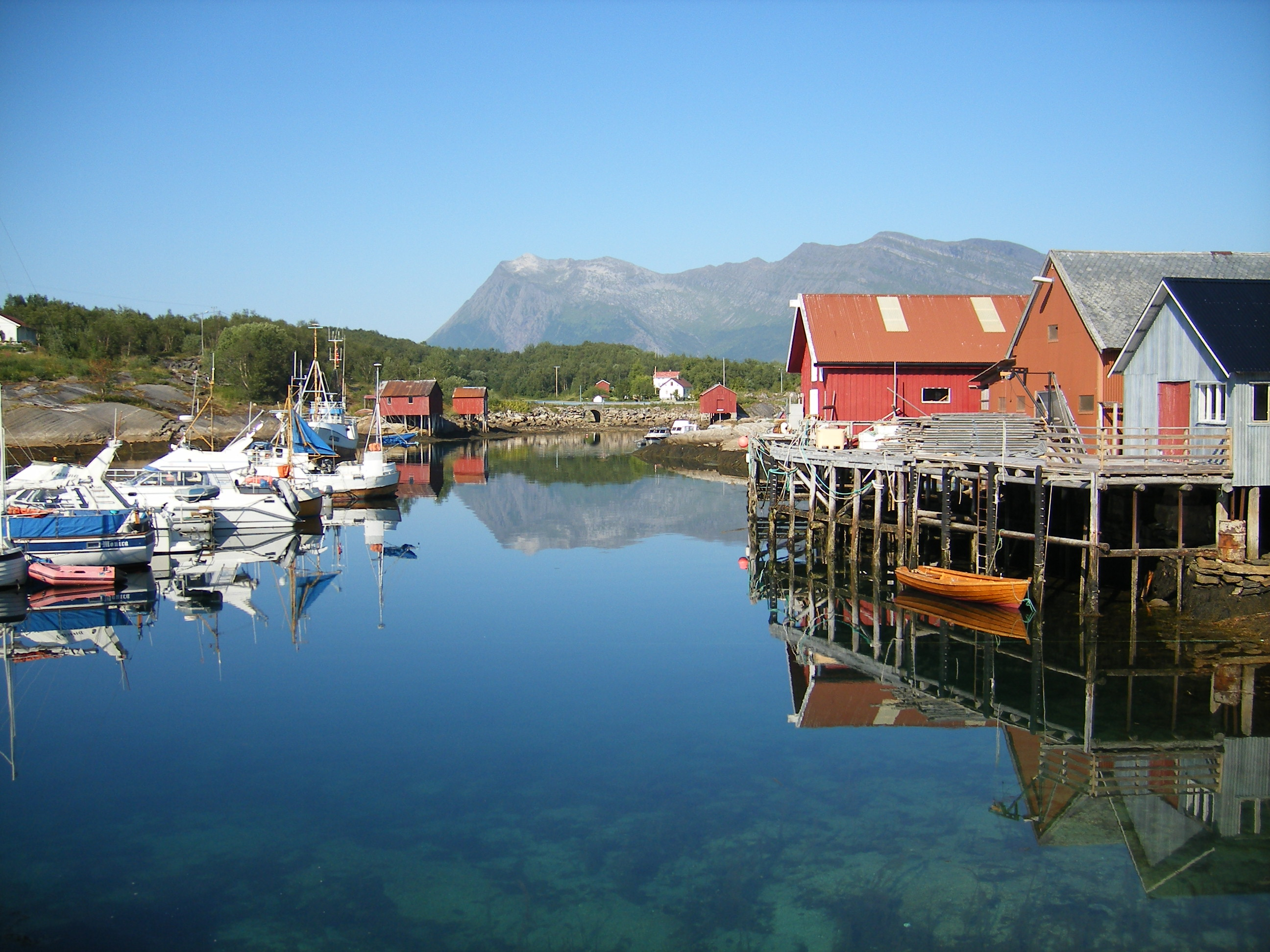
- View of the village harbor
- Interactive map of Inndyr
- Location within Nordland Location within Norway
- Coordinates: 67.0335°N 14.0266°E
- Country: Norway
- Region: Northern Norway
- County: Nordland
- District: Salten
- Municipality: Gildeskål Municipality

Area
  - Total: 0.76 km^{2} (0.29 sq mi)
- Elevation: 9 m (30 ft)

Population (2023)
  - Total: 637
  - Density: 838/km^{2} (2,170/sq mi)
- Time zone: UTC+01:00 (CET)
  - Summer (DST): UTC+02:00 (CEST)
- Post Code: 8140 Inndyr

Inndyr is the administrative centre of Gildeskål Municipality in Nordland county, Norway. The village is located on the mainland part of the municipality, about 6 kilometres (3.7 mi) north of Norwegian County Road 17. The village lies along the Sørfjorden and it looks out to the west over the nearby islands of Fugløya, Fleina, and Femris.

The 0.76-square-kilometre (190-acre) village has a population (2023) of 637 and a population density of 838 inhabitants per square kilometre (2,170/sq mi).

There are two churches located on the northern edge of town: Gildeskål Church and Old Gildeskål Church. The new, larger church was built right next to the old church. The old church is still occasionally used for services.

== Climate ==
This climate type is dominated by the winter season, a long, bitterly cold period with short, clear days, relatively little precipitation mostly in the form of snow, and low humidity. The Köppen Climate Classification sub-type for this climate is "Dfc" (Continental Subarctic Climate).
