= Nygårdsjøen =

Village in Gildeskål Municipality, Norway

Nygårdsjøen Nygårdsjyen Nygård / Saura
- Village
- Interactive map of Nygårdsjøen; Nygårdsjyen
- Location within Nordland Location within Norway
- Coordinates: 67.1130°N 14.3076°E
- Country: Norway
- Region: Northern Norway
- County: Nordland
- District: Salten
- Municipality: Gildeskål Municipality
- Elevation: 20 m (66 ft)
- Time zone: UTC+01:00 (CET)
  - Summer (DST): UTC+02:00 (CEST)
- Post Code: 8120 Nygårdsjøen

Nygårdsjøen or Nygårdsjyen is a village area in Gildeskål Municipality in Nordland county, Norway. Nygårdsjøen is located in the northern part of the municipality, close to the border with Bodø Municipality. The village lies along Norwegian County Road 17 on the east side of the Nordfjorden, just north of the entrance to the Beiar Fjord. Saura Church is located along the fjord on the west side of the village.

The village area of Nygårdsjøen includes several farm areas: Innervik, Skålsvik, Røsnes, Saura, Nygård, and Ertenvåg. There are about 270 people that live in Nygårdsjøen.
