= Mevik Chapel =

Church in Nordland, Norway

- Mevik kapell
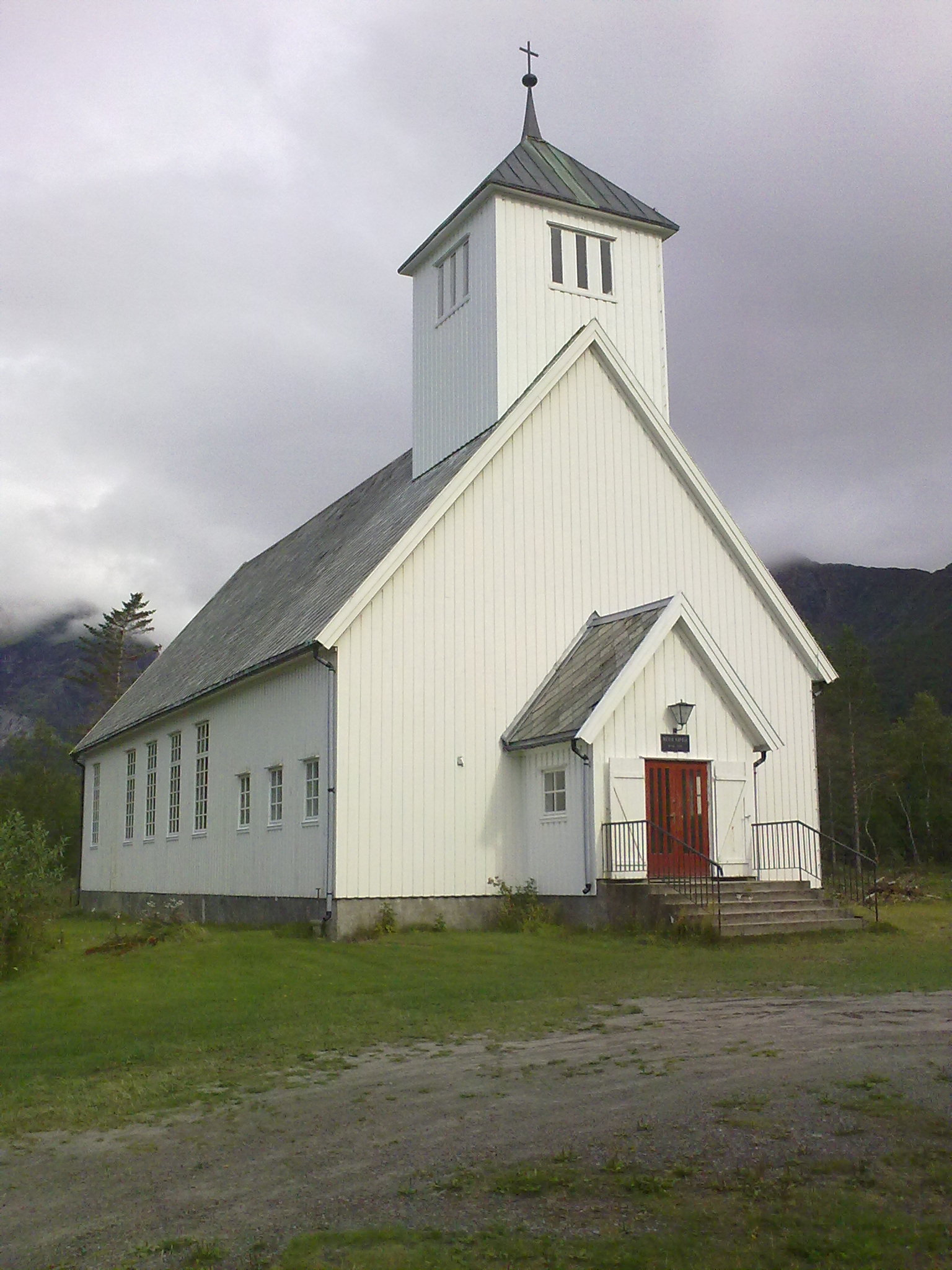
- View of the chapel
- Mevik Chapel
- 66.9472176°N 13.7479466°E
- Location: Gildeskål Municipality, Nordland
- Country: Norway
- Denomination: Church of Norway
- Churchmanship: Evangelical Lutheran

History
- Status: Chapel
- Founded: 1910 (116 years ago)
- Consecrated: 1910 (116 years ago)

Architecture
- Functional status: Active
- Architectural type: Long church
- Completed: 1910 (116 years ago)

Specifications
- Capacity: 240
- Materials: Wood

Administration
- Diocese: Sør-Hålogaland
- Deanery: Bodø domprosti
- Parish: Gildeskål
- Norwegian Cultural Heritage Site
- Type: Church
- Status: Not protected
- ID: 84942

Mevik Chapel (Norwegian: Mevik kapell) is a chapel of the Church of Norway in Gildeskål Municipality in Nordland county, Norway. It is located in the village of Mevik. It is an annex chapel in the Gildeskål parish which is part of the Bodø domprosti (deanery) in the Diocese of Sør-Hålogaland. The white, wooden chapel was built in a long church style in 1910. The chapel seats about 240 people. The building was renovated in 1957.

== See also ==
- List of churches in Sør-Hålogaland
