= Mevik =

Village in Gildeskål Municipality, Norway

- Village
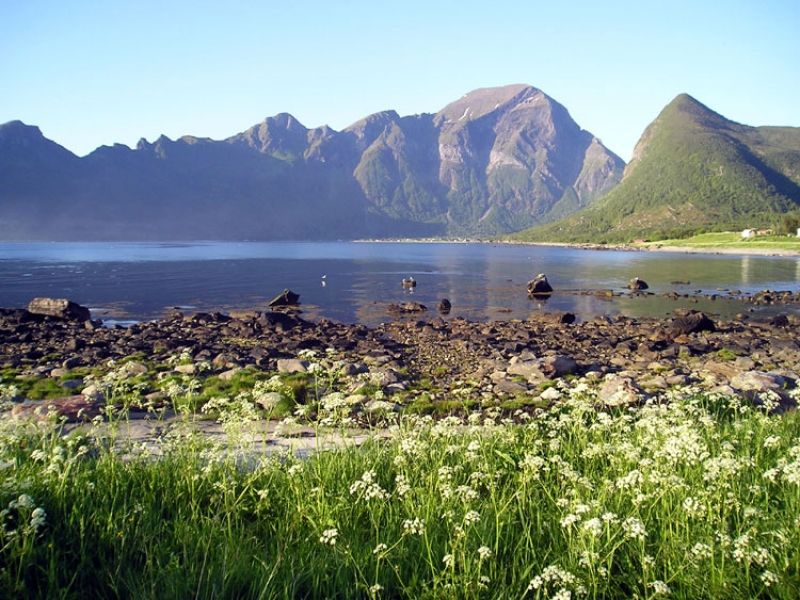
- Mevik
- Interactive map of Mevik
- Location within Nordland Location within Norway
- Coordinates: 66.9456°N 13.7363°E
- Country: Norway
- Region: Northern Norway
- County: Nordland
- District: Salten
- Municipality: Gildeskål Municipality
- Elevation: 10 m (33 ft)
- Time zone: UTC+01:00 (CET)
  - Summer (DST): UTC+02:00 (CEST)
- Post Code: 8145 Storvik

Mevik is a village in Gildeskål Municipality in Nordland county, Norway. It is located in the southwestern part of the municipality, about 4 kilometres (2.5 mi) west of the village of Storvik and about 10 kilometres (6.2 mi) northeast of the village of Reipå (in Meløy Municipality). The village is located along Norwegian County Road 17. Mevik Chapel is located in the village.
