= Sørfjorden Chapel =

Church in Nordland, Norway

- Sørfjorden kapell
- Sørfjorden Chapel
- 66.97856352°N 13.98233145°E
- Location: Gildeskål Municipality, Nordland
- Country: Norway
- Denomination: Church of Norway
- Churchmanship: Evangelical Lutheran

History
- Former name: Bethania bedehus
- Status: Chapel
- Founded: 1927 (99 years ago)
- Consecrated: July 3, 1927 (98 years ago)

Architecture
- Functional status: Active
- Architect: Thomas Strandskogen
- Architectural type: Long church
- Completed: 1927 (99 years ago)

Specifications
- Capacity: 300
- Materials: Wood

Administration
- Diocese: Sør-Hålogaland
- Deanery: Bodø domprosti
- Parish: Gildeskål
- Norwegian Cultural Heritage Site
- Type: Church
- Status: Not protected
- ID: 85050

Sørfjorden Chapel (Norwegian: Sørfjorden kapell) is a chapel of the Church of Norway in Gildeskål Municipality in Nordland county, Norway. It is located in the village of Sørfinnset. It is an annex chapel in the Gildeskål parish which is part of the Bodø domprosti (deanery) in the Diocese of Sør-Hålogaland, although the chapel building is not owned by the parish, it is privately owned by the local residents of the Sørfjorden farms. The white, wooden chapel was built in a long church style in 1927 using plans drawn up by the architect Thomas Strandskogen. The chapel seats about 300 people. The church is used for worship services about four times each year.

== History ==
The building was originally constructed as a small "bedehus" chapel in 1927. It was named Bethania bedehus. It was consecrated on 3 July 1927. In 1957, it was expanded with the addition of a chancel and a tower. It was then consecrated as a "chapel" on 30 June 1957 by the Bishop Wollert Krohn-Hansen.

== See also ==
- List of churches in Sør-Hålogaland
