= Storvik, Norway =

Village in Gildeskål Municipality, Norway

Storvik Storvika
- Village
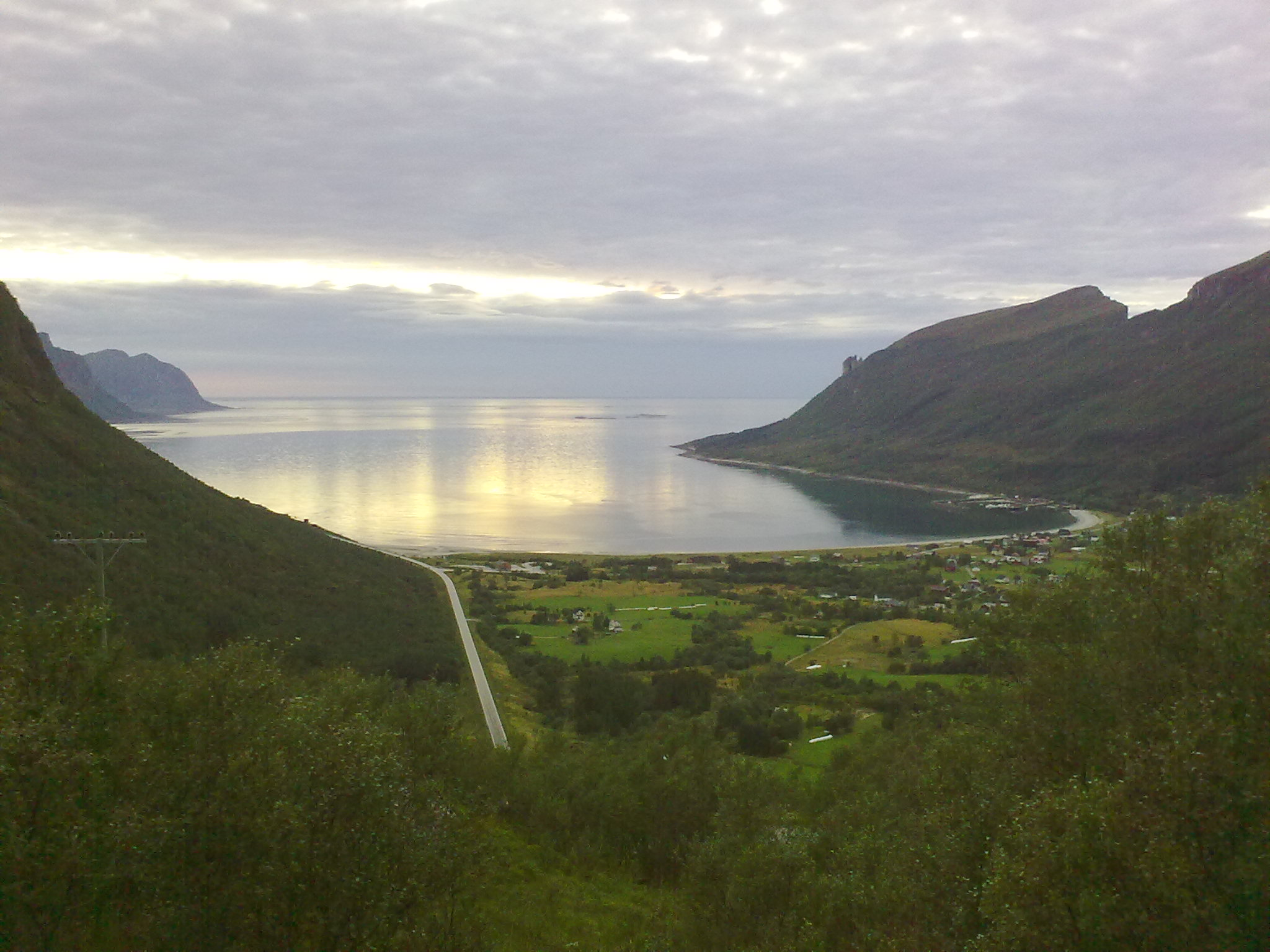
- View of the village
- Interactive map of Storvik
- Location within Nordland Location within Norway
- Coordinates: 66.9632°N 13.8055°E
- Country: Norway
- Region: Northern Norway
- County: Nordland
- District: Salten
- Municipality: Gildeskål Municipality
- Elevation: 6 m (20 ft)
- Time zone: UTC+01:00 (CET)
  - Summer (DST): UTC+02:00 (CEST)
- Post Code: 8145 Storvik

Storvik is a village in Gildeskål Municipality in Nordland county, Norway. The village is located in the southern part of the municipality, about 4 kilometres (2.5 mi) northeast of the village of Mevik and about 10 kilometres (6.2 mi) west of Sørfinnset. The village is located along Norwegian County Road 17, at the western end of the 3,118-metre (10,230 ft) long Storvikskar Tunnel.

== Media gallery ==
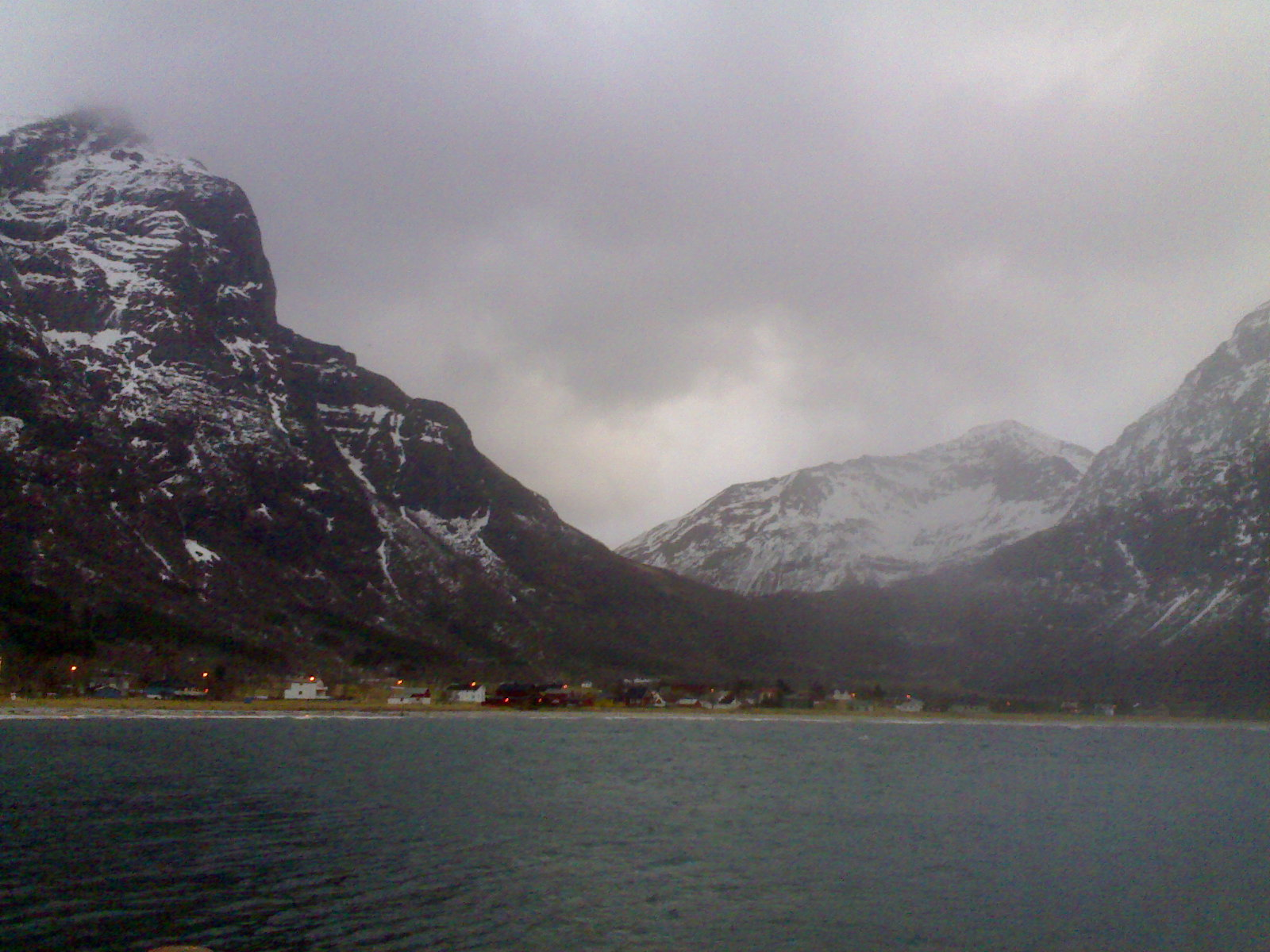
View of the village

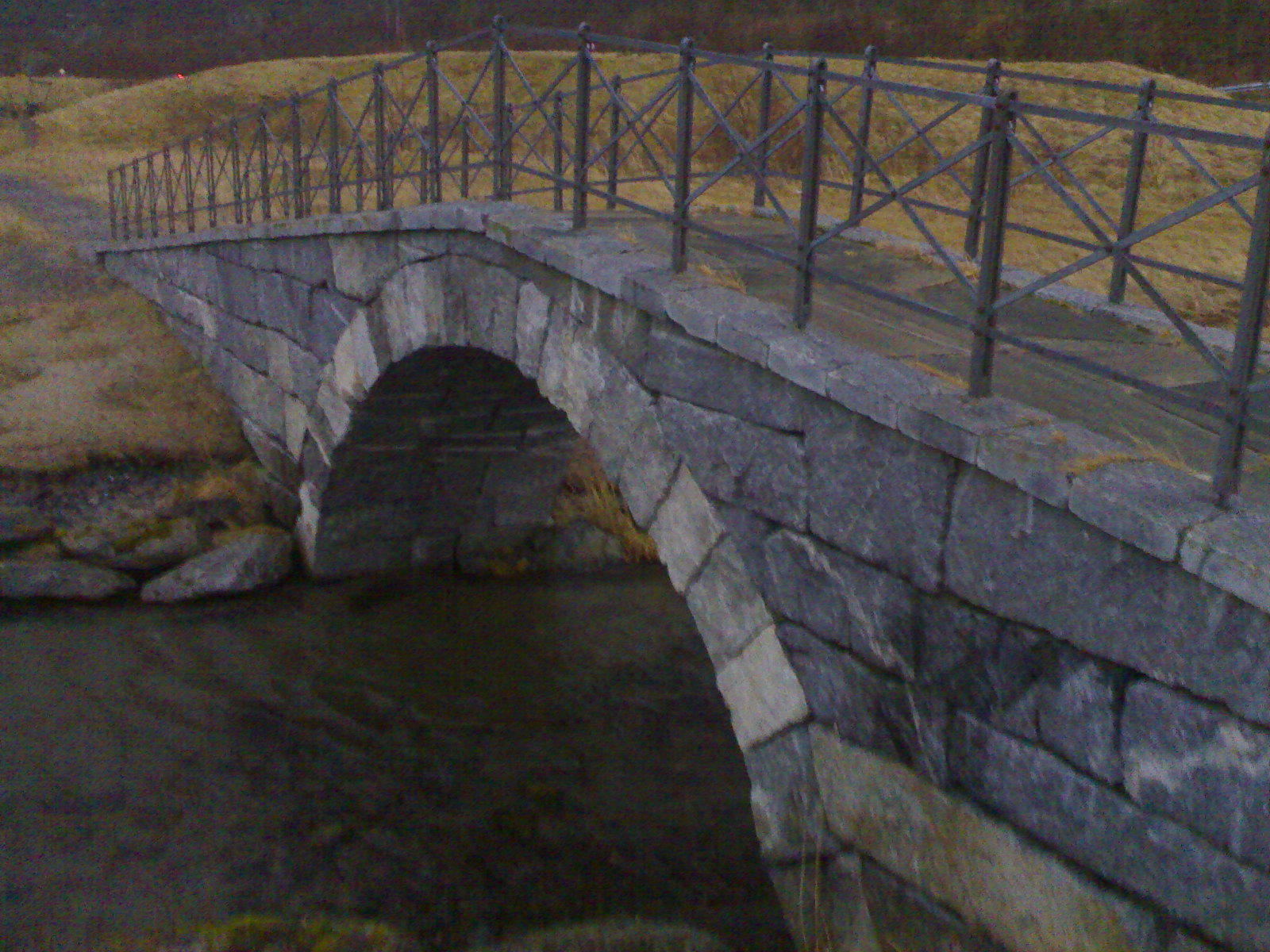
Bridge in the village

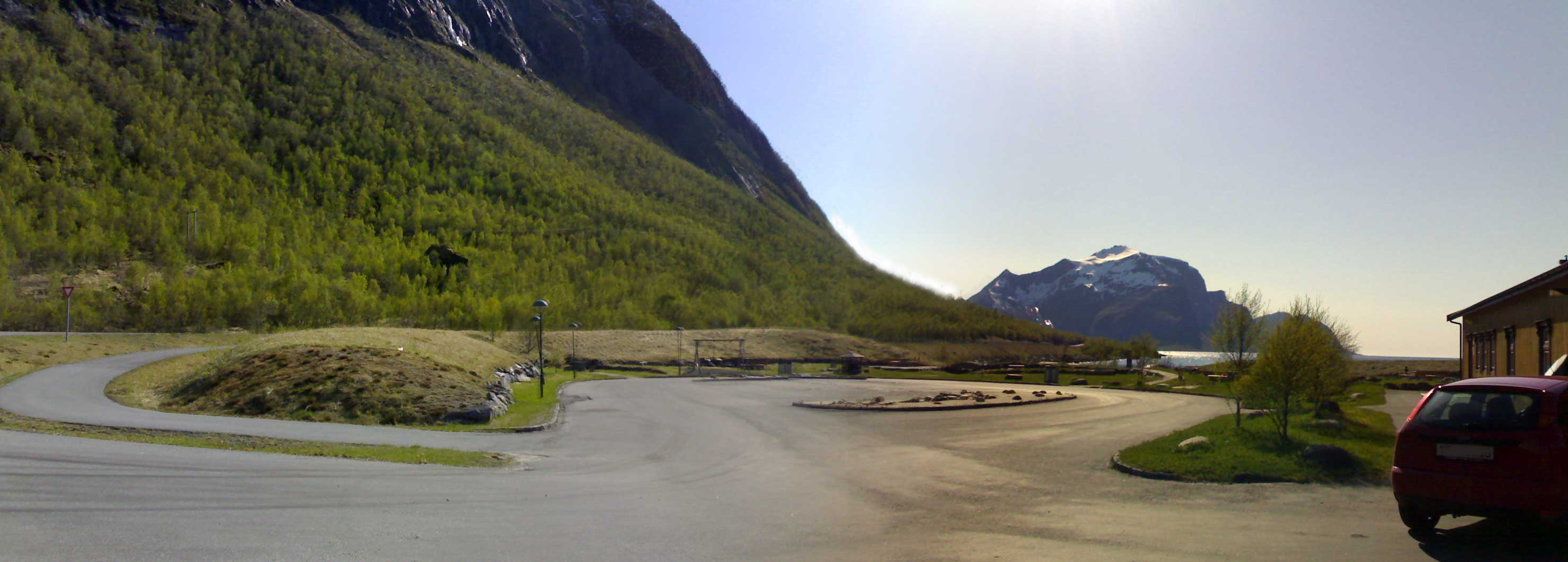
View of the area
