= Saura Church =

Church in Nordland, Norway

- Saura kirke
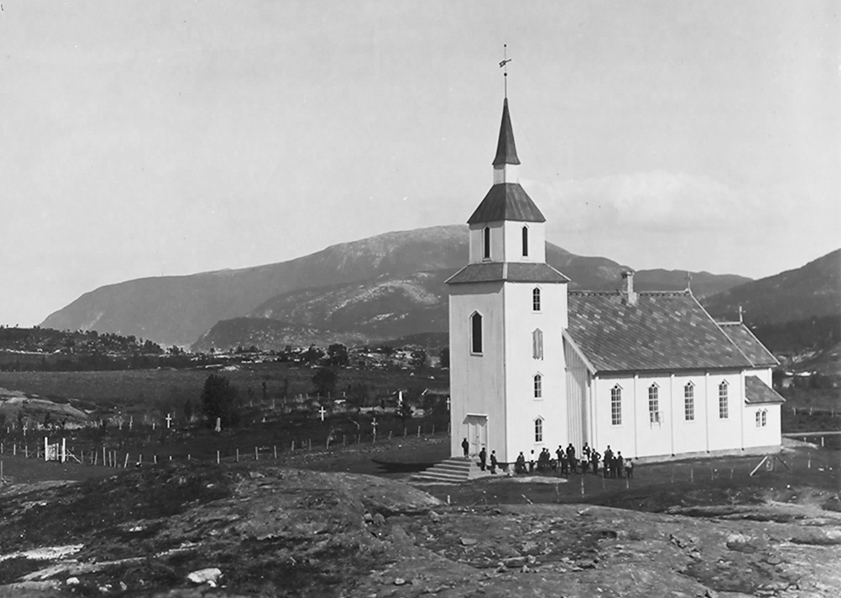
- View of the church
- Saura Church
- 67.10181103°N 14.2847291°E
- Location: Gildeskål Municipality, Nordland
- Country: Norway
- Denomination: Church of Norway
- Churchmanship: Evangelical Lutheran

History
- Status: Parish church
- Founded: 1884 (142 years ago)
- Consecrated: 1884 (142 years ago)

Architecture
- Functional status: Active
- Architect: Carl J. Bergstrøm
- Architectural type: Long church
- Completed: 1884 (142 years ago)

Specifications
- Capacity: 250
- Materials: Wood

Administration
- Diocese: Sør-Hålogaland
- Deanery: Bodø domprosti
- Parish: Gildeskål
- Norwegian Cultural Heritage Site
- Type: Church
- Status: Not protected
- ID: 85406

Saura Church (Norwegian: Saura kirke) is a parish church of the Church of Norway in Gildeskål Municipality in Nordland county, Norway. It is located in the village of Saura. It is one of the churches for the Gildeskål parish which is part of the Bodø domprosti (deanery) in the Diocese of Sør-Hålogaland. The white, wooden church was built in a long church style in 1884 using plans drawn up by the architect Carl J. Bergstrøm. The church seats about 250 people.

== See also ==
- List of churches in Sør-Hålogaland
