= Nordstranda Chapel =

Church in Nordland, Norway

- Nordstranda kapell
- Nordstranda Chapel
- 67.11783197°N 14.04892695°E
- Location: Gildeskål Municipality, Nordland
- Country: Norway
- Denomination: Church of Norway
- Churchmanship: Evangelical Lutheran

History
- Status: Chapel
- Founded: 1963 (63 years ago)
- Consecrated: 1963 (63 years ago)

Architecture
- Functional status: Active
- Architect: Kirsten Wleügel Knutssøn
- Architectural type: Long church
- Completed: 1963 (63 years ago)

Specifications
- Capacity: 163
- Materials: Wood

Administration
- Diocese: Sør-Hålogaland
- Deanery: Bodø domprosti
- Parish: Gildeskål
- Norwegian Cultural Heritage Site
- Type: Church
- Status: Not protected
- ID: 85171

Nordstranda Chapel (Norwegian: Nordstranda kapell) is a chapel of the Church of Norway in Gildeskål Municipality in Nordland county, Norway. It is located in the village of Lekanger on the west side of the island of Sandhornøya. It is an annex chapel in the Gildeskål parish which is part of the Bodø domprosti (deanery) in the Diocese of Sør-Hålogaland. The white, wooden chapel was built in a long church style in 1963 using plans drawn up by the architect Kirsten Wleügel Knutssøn. The chapel seats about 160 people.

== See also ==
- List of churches in Sør-Hålogaland
