= Lekanger =

Village in Gildeskål Municipality, Norway

- Village
- Interactive map of Lekanger
- Location within Nordland Location within Norway
- Coordinates: 67.1123°N 14.0373°E
- Country: Norway
- Region: Northern Norway
- County: Nordland
- District: Salten
- Municipality: Gildeskål Municipality
- Elevation: 18 m (59 ft)
- Time zone: UTC+01:00 (CET)
  - Summer (DST): UTC+02:00 (CEST)
- Post Code: 8130 Sandhornøy

Lekanger is a village in Gildeskål Municipality in Nordland county, Norway. The village is located on the western side of the island of Sandhornøya, south of the villages of Mårnes and Våg. Nordstranda Chapel is located in the village.
