= Fugløya, Gildeskål =

Island in Nordland, Norway

Fugløya
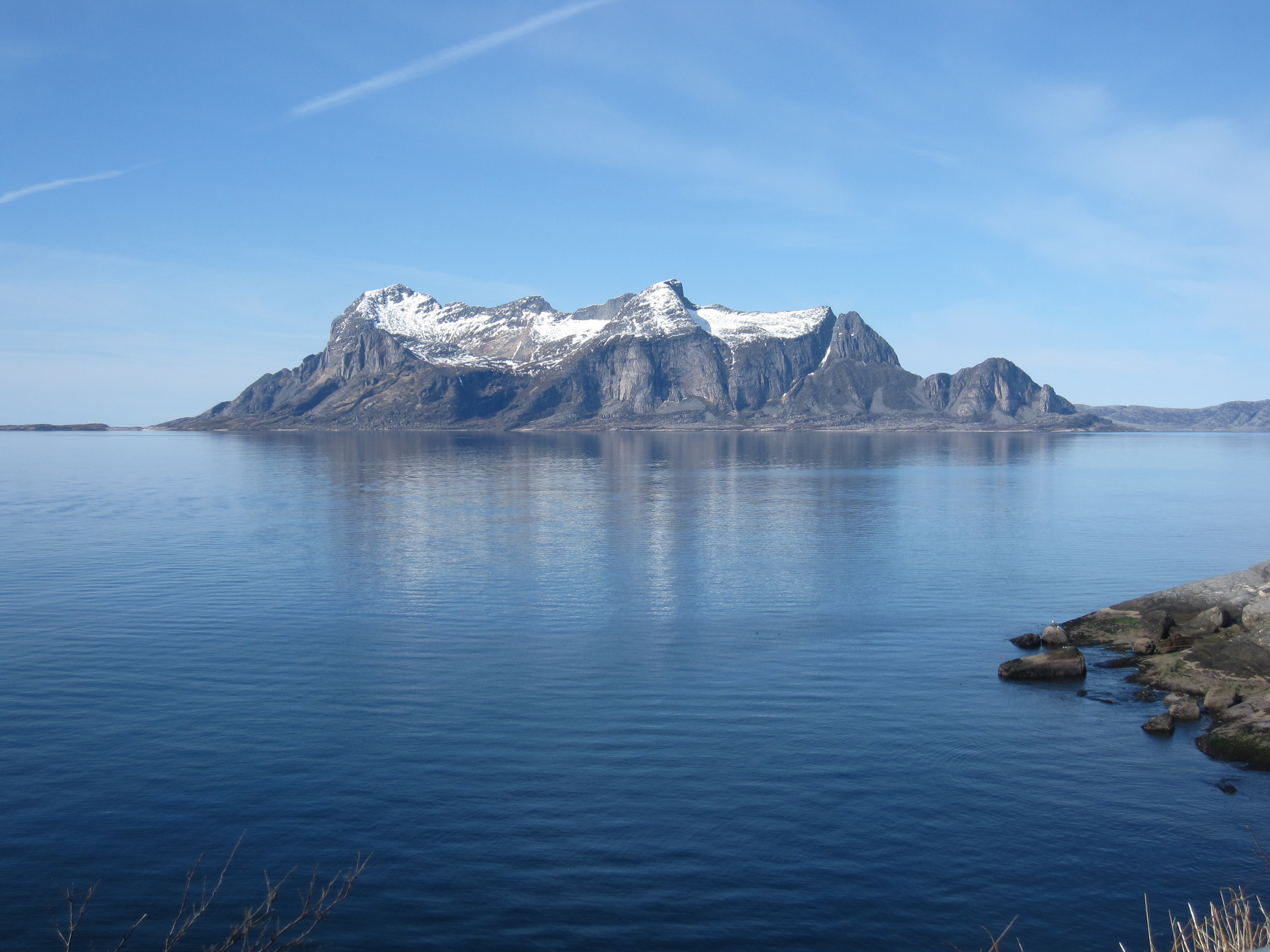
- Interactive map of Fugløya

Geography
- Location: Nordland, Norway
- Coordinates: 67.0679°N 13.7926°E
- Archipelago: Fugløyvær
- Area: 13 km^{2} (5.0 sq mi)
- Length: 6 km (3.7 mi)
- Width: 3.5 km (2.17 mi)
- Highest elevation: 765 m (2510 ft)
- Highest point: Hagtinden

Administration
- Norway
- County: Nordland
- Municipality: Gildeskål Municipality

Demographics
- Population: 0 (2016)

Fugløya is an island in Gildeskål Municipality in Nordland county, Norway. The 13-square-kilometre (5.0 sq mi) island is very mountainous, with the highest point being the 765-metre (2,510 ft) tall Hagtinden. The island has no permanent residents (as of 2016), but as recently as the 1960s, there were 124 residents living on the island. The island has several large bird colonies, including puffins. It lies in the Fugløyvær archipelago which includes about 140 small islands and this one large island.

There were two main settlements on the island: Sør-Fugløy in the south and Nord-Fugløy in the north. Both are now used as vacation homes. The islands of Fleina, Sør-Arnøya, Nord-Arnøya, and Sandhornøya lie several kilometers to the northeast.

== Media gallery ==
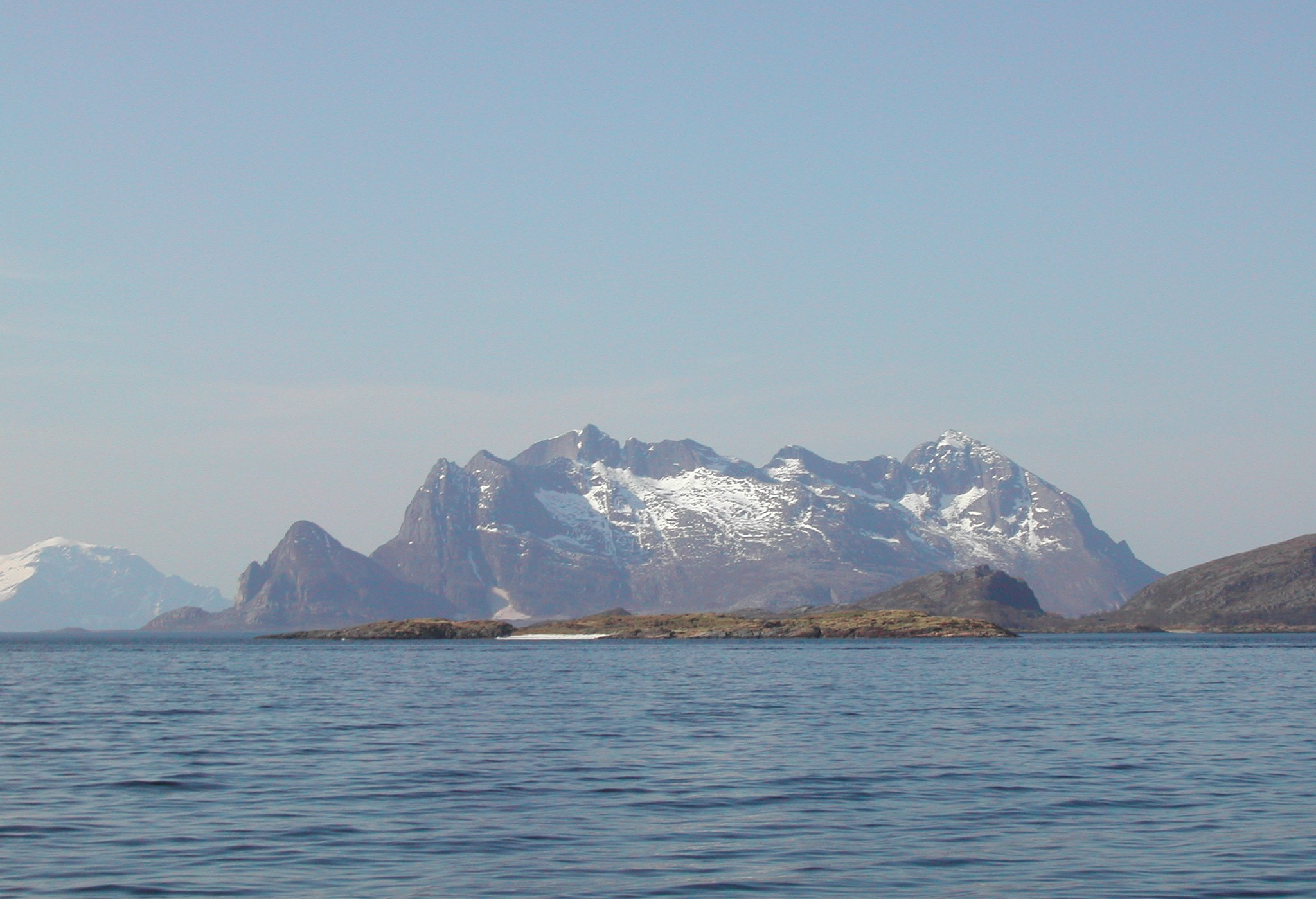

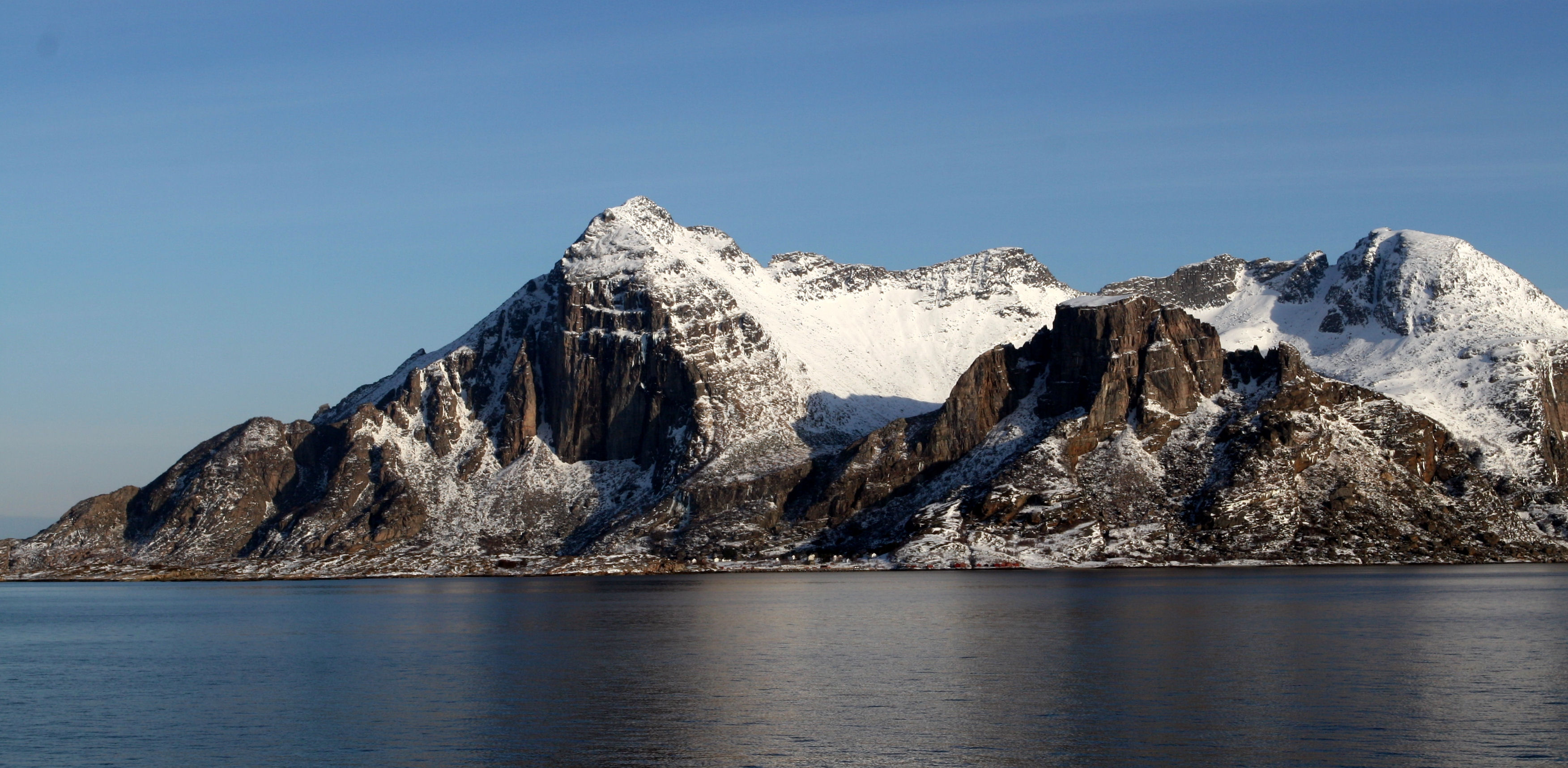

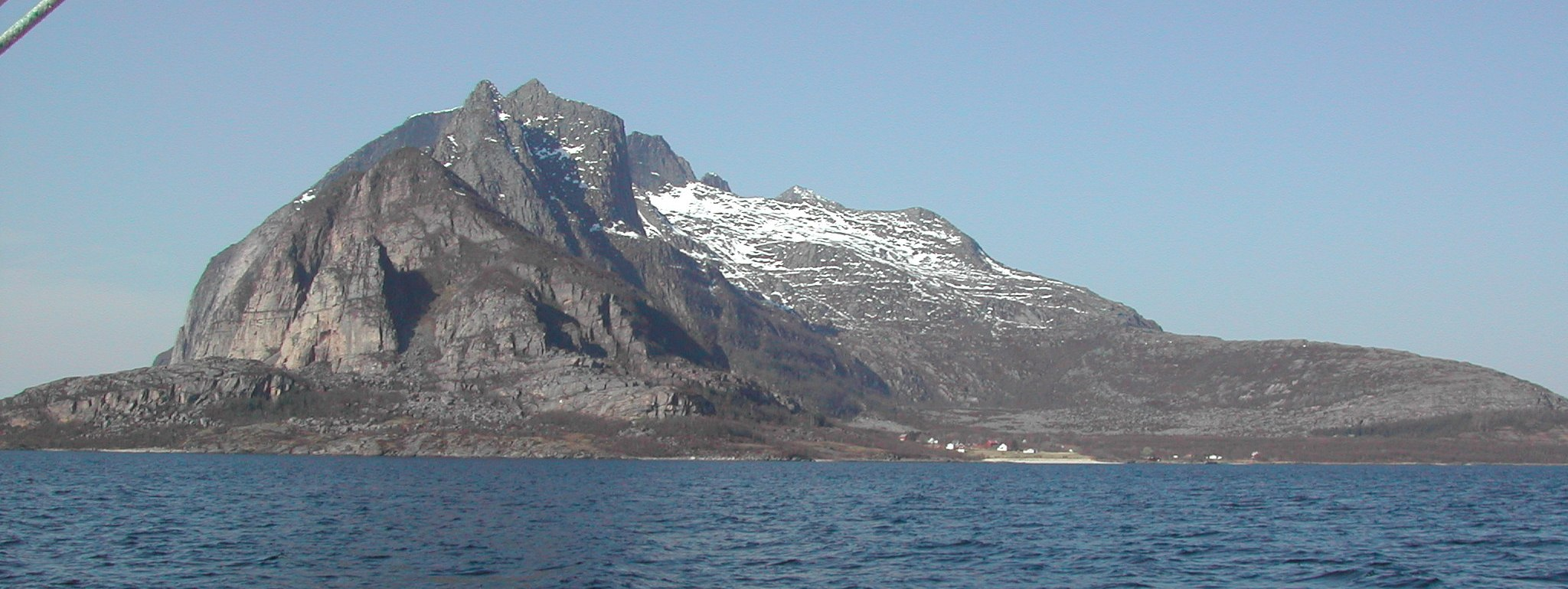

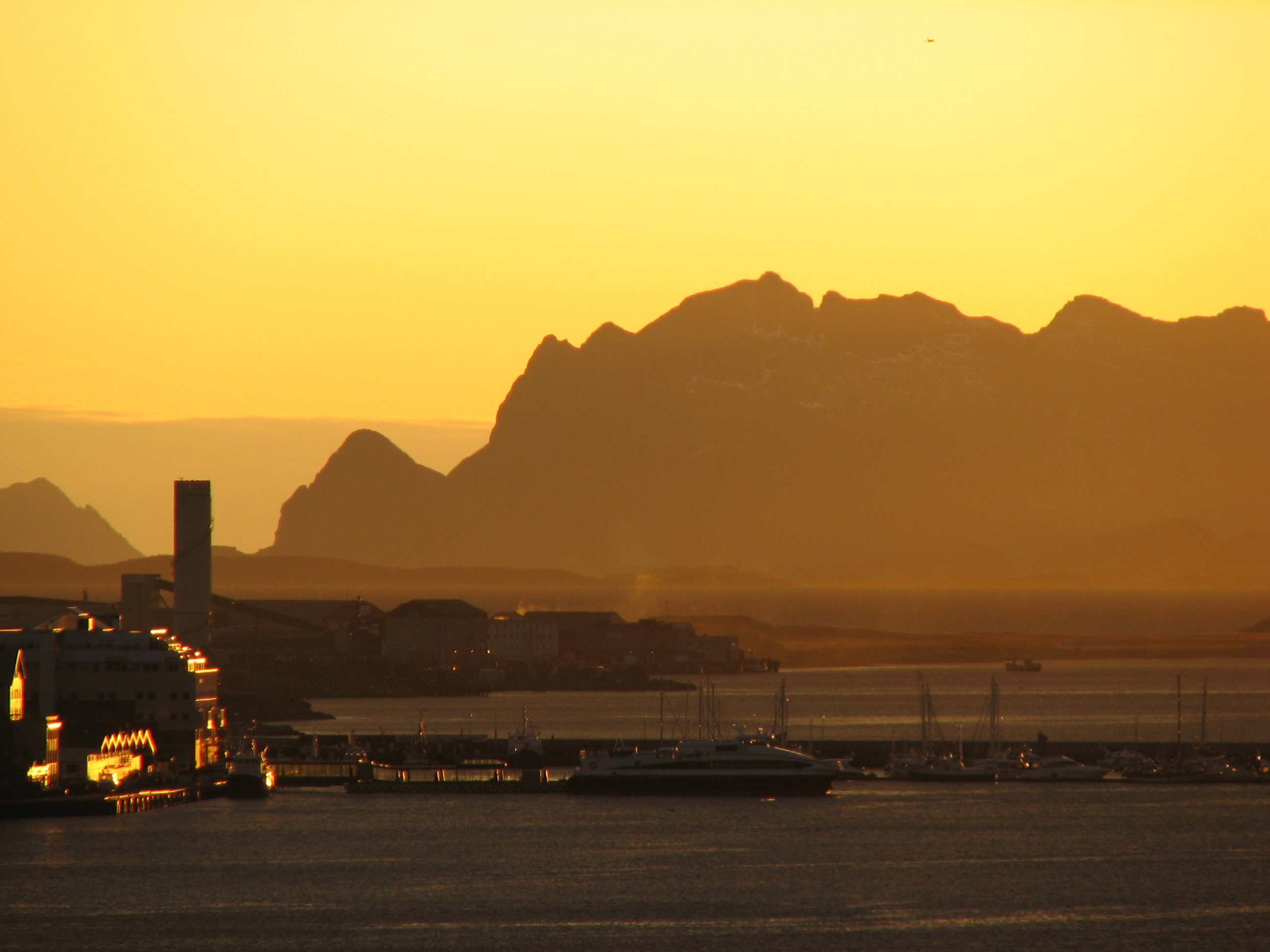

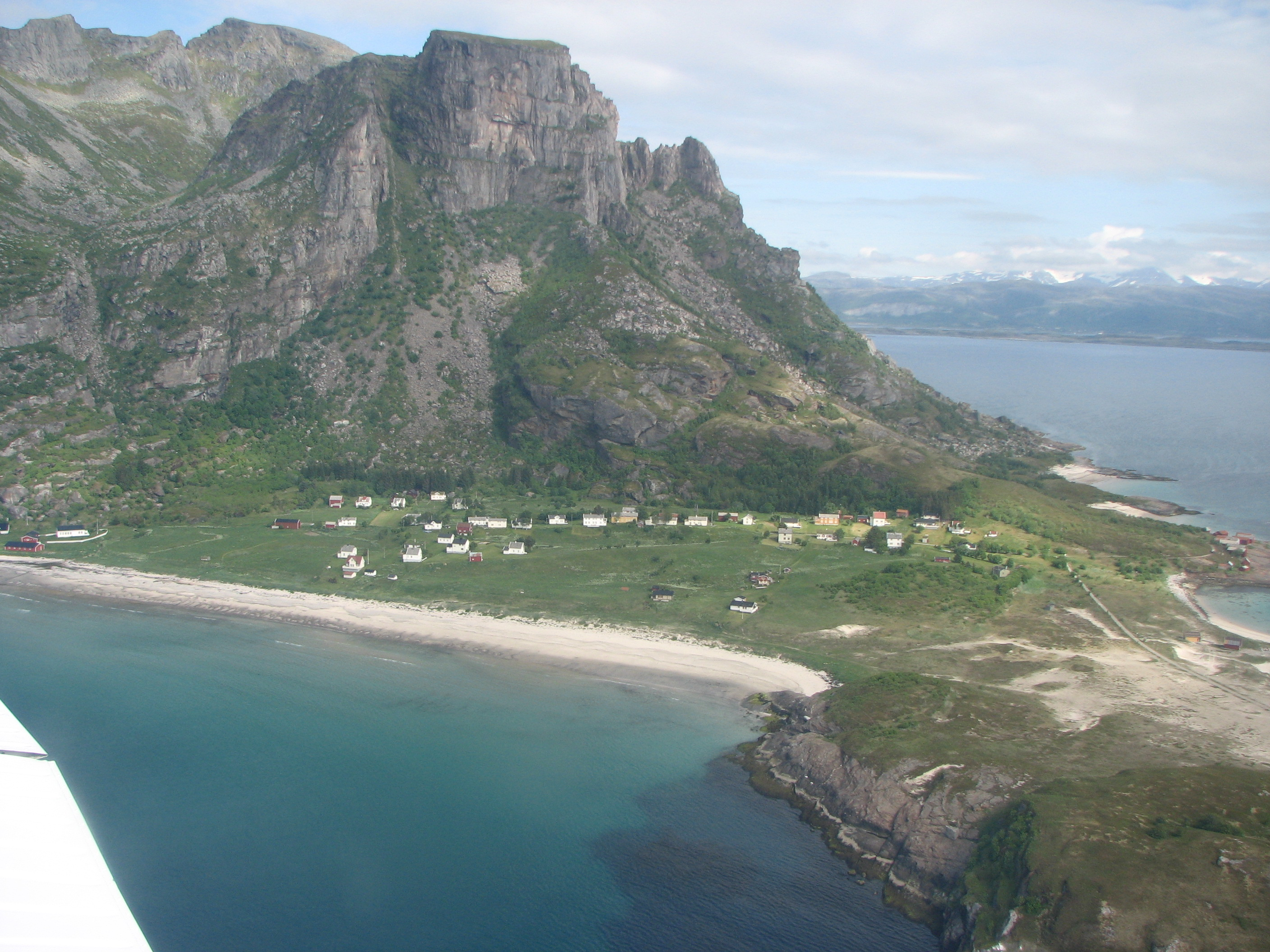

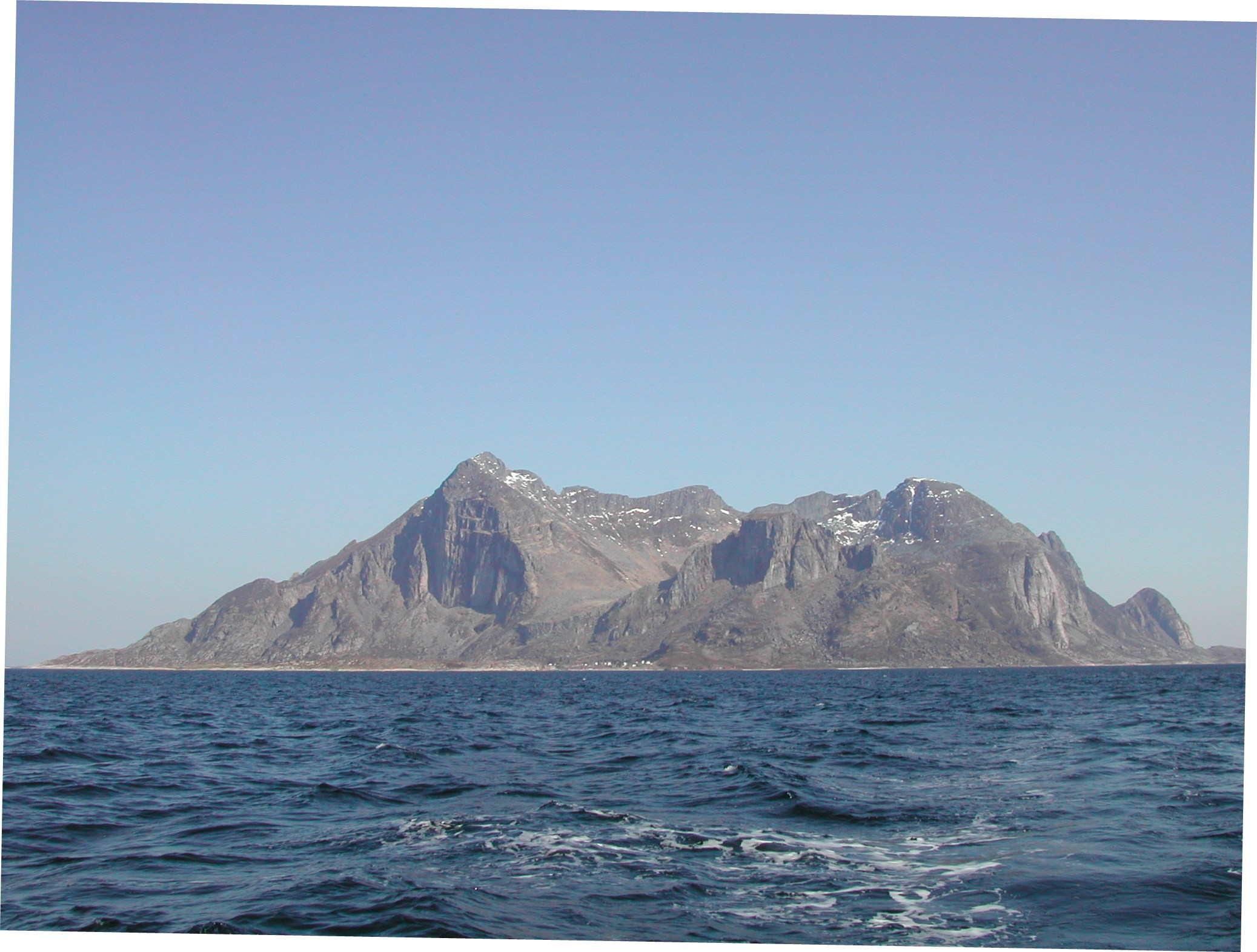

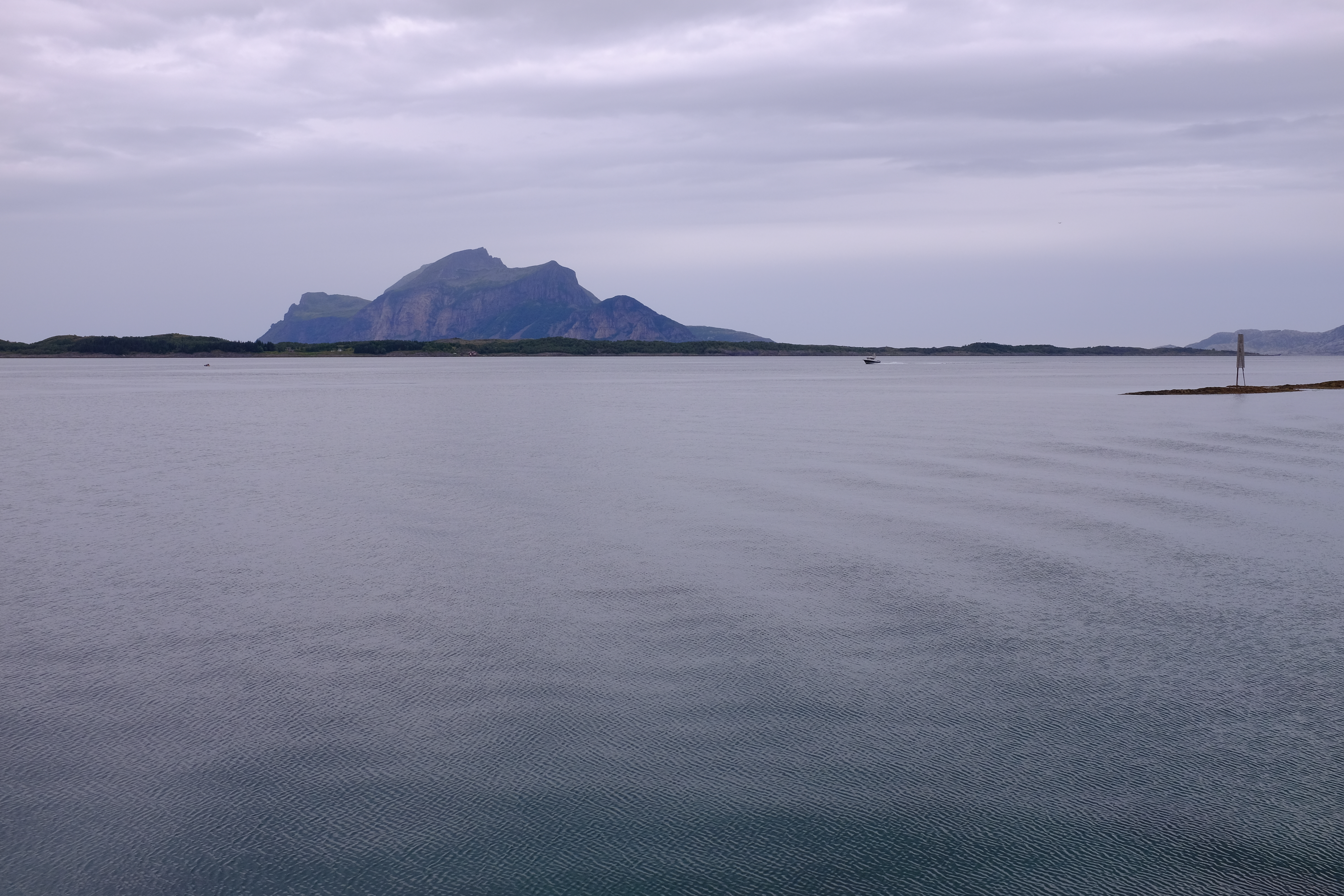

== See also ==
- List of islands of Norway
