= Gildeskål Municipality =

Municipality in Nordland, Norway

Gildeskål Municipality Gildeskål kommune
- Municipality
- Gildeskaal herred (historic name)
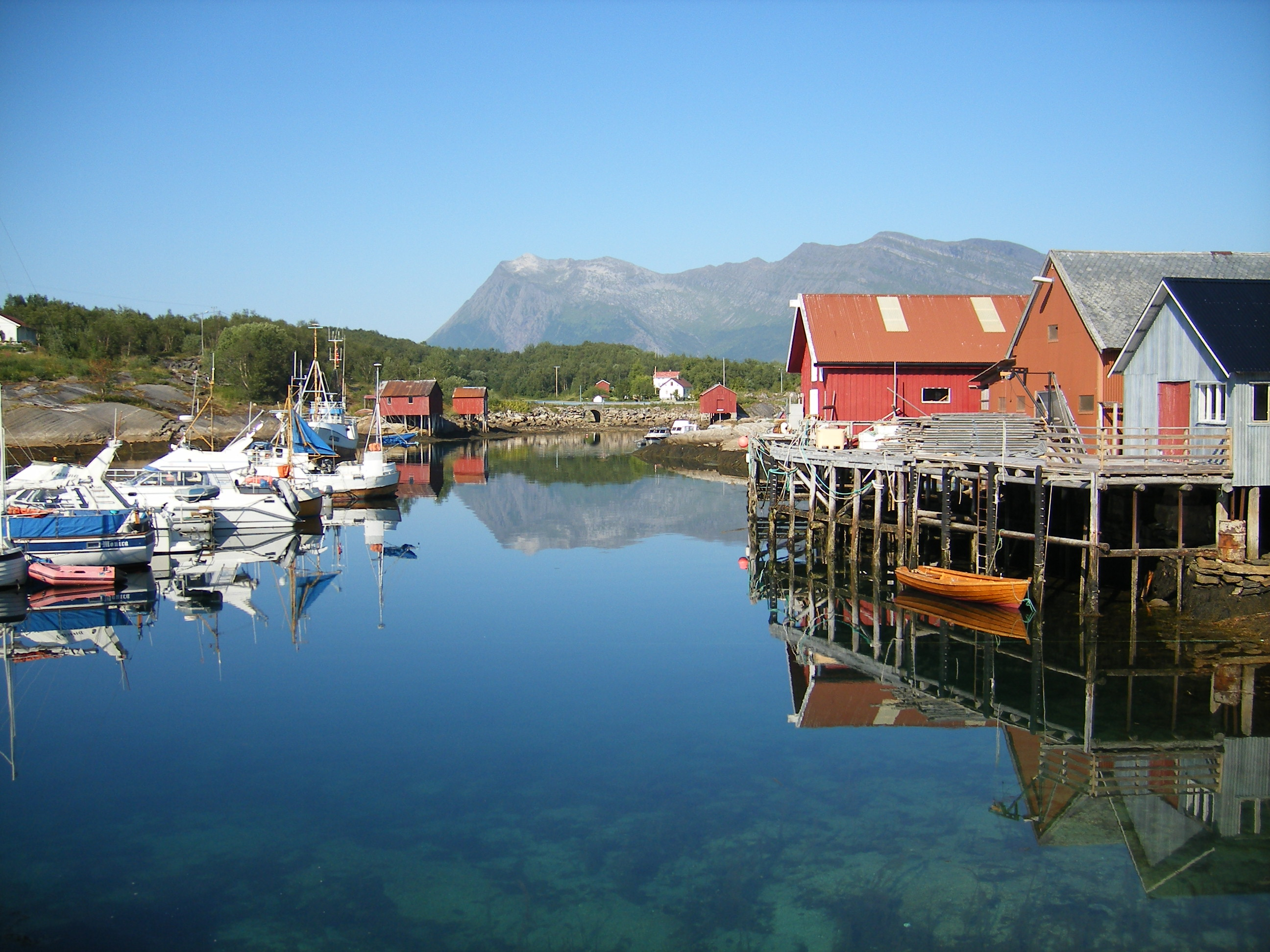
- View of Inndyr

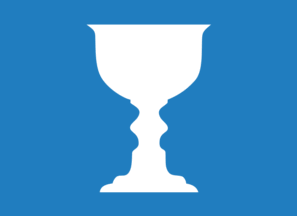
- Flag Coat of arms

- Nordland within Norway

- Gildeskål within Nordland
- Coordinates: 67°01′24″N 14°04′38″E
- Country: Norway
- County: Nordland
- District: Salten
- Established: 1 Jan 1838
  - Created as: Formannskapsdistrikt
- Administrative centre: Inndyr

Government
  - Mayor (2019): Bjørn Magne Pedersen (H)

Area
  - Total: 664.70 km^{2} (256.64 sq mi)
  - Land: 622.27 km^{2} (240.26 sq mi)
  - Water: 42.43 km^{2} (16.38 sq mi) 6.4%
  - Rank: #170 in Norway
- Highest elevation: 1,331.83 m (4,369.5 ft)

Population (2024)
  - Total: 1,958
  - Rank: #285 in Norway
  - Density: 2.9/km^{2} (7.5/sq mi)
  - Change (10 years): ▼ −3.2%
- Demonym(s): Gildeskålfjerding; Gildeskålværing

Official language
  - Norwegian form: Neutral
- Time zone: UTC+01:00 (CET)
  - Summer (DST): UTC+02:00 (CEST)
- ISO 3166 code: NO-1838
- Website: Official website

Gildeskål is a municipality in Nordland county, Norway. It is part of the Bodø Region and the traditional district of Salten. The administrative centre of the municipality is the village of Inndyr. Other villages include Forstranda, Lekanger, Mevik, Mårnes, Nygårdsjøen, Saura, Storvik, Sør-Arnøy, Sørfinnset, and Våg.

The 665-square-kilometre (257 sq mi) municipality is the 170th largest by area out of the 357 municipalities in Norway. Gildeskål Municipality is the 285th most populous municipality in Norway with a population of 1,958. The municipality's population density is 2.9 inhabitants per square kilometre (7.5/sq mi) and its population has decreased by 3.2% over the previous 10-year period.

== General information ==
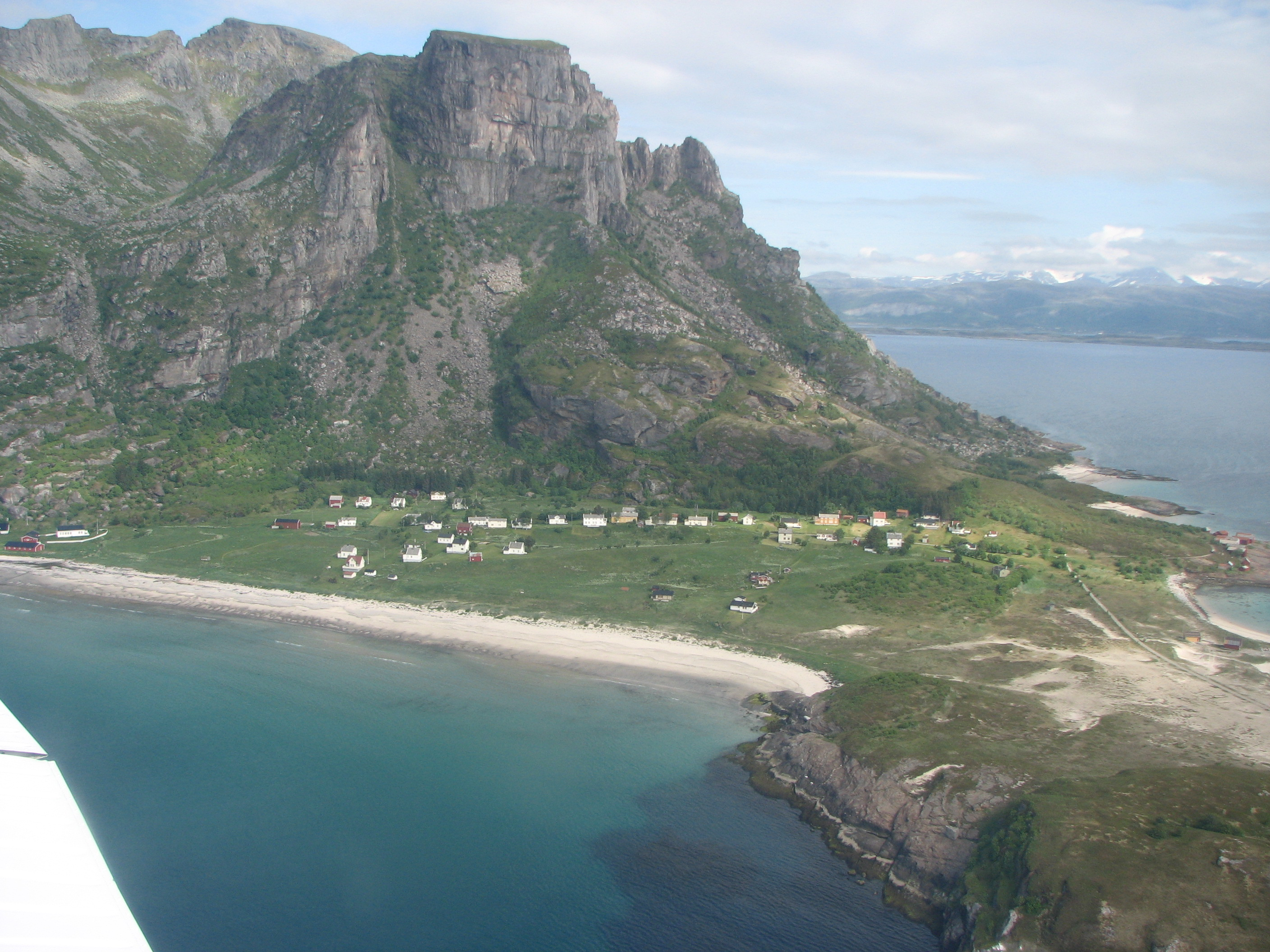
Fugløya ('Bird Island')

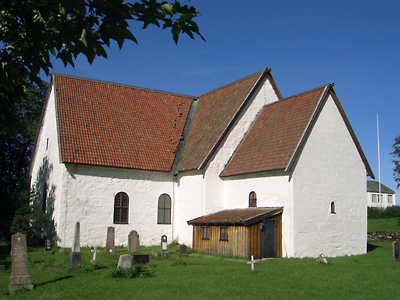
The 900-year-old Old Gildeskål Church

The municipality of Gildeskaal (later spelled Gildeskål) was established as a municipality on 1 January 1838 (see formannskapsdistrikt law). In 1853, the eastern (inland) district of Gildeskaal Municipality (population: about 1,150) was separated to become the new Beiarn Municipality. This left Gildeskaal Municipality with about 2,400 residents. The municipal boundaries have not changed since.

=== Name ===
The municipality (originally the parish) is named after the old Gildeskaal farm (Old Norse: Gildaskáli) since the first Gildeskål Church was built there. The first element is the plural genitive case of gildi which means "feast" or "banquet". The last element is skáli which means "hall". On 21 December 1917, a royal resolution enacted the 1917 Norwegian language reforms. Prior to this change, the name was spelled Gildeskaal with the digraph "aa", and after this reform, the name was spelled Gildeskål, using the letter å instead.

=== Coat of arms ===
The coat of arms was granted on 12 February 1988. The official blazon is "Azure, a chalice argent" (Norwegian: I blått en sølv kalk). This means the arms have a blue field (background) and the charge is a chalice. The chalice has a tincture of argent which means it is commonly colored white, but if it is made out of metal, then silver is used. The arms are canting since the meaning of the municipal name Gildeskål refers to a banquet hall (or guildhall) which, of course, is a place where one might drink from a chalice. The arms were designed by Arvid Sveen.

=== Churches ===
The Church of Norway has one parish (sokn) within Gildeskål Municipality. It is part of the Bodø domprosti (arch-deanery) in the Diocese of Sør-Hålogaland.

Churches in Gildeskål Municipality
Parish (sokn)	Church name	Location of the church	Year built
Gildeskål	Gildeskål Church	Inndyr	1881
Gildeskål	Old Gildeskål Church	Inndyr	12th century
Gildeskål	Saura Church	Saura	1884
Gildeskål	Mevik Chapel	Mevik	1910
Gildeskål	Nordstranda Chapel	Lekanger	1963
Gildeskål	Sørfjorden Chapel	Sørfinnset	1957

== Geography ==
Gildeskål is a coastal municipality that encompasses part of the mainland as well as many islands. Major islands include Fleina, Fugløya, Nord-Arnøya, Sør-Arnøya, and Sandhornøya. The southern part of the municipality includes part of the Saltfjellet mountains and the northern part of the municipality borders the Saltfjorden and the Vestfjorden.

There are many lakes in the municipality including: Fellvatnet, Langvatnet, Litle Sokumvatnet, and Sokumvatnet. The highest point in the municipality is the 1,331.83-metre (4,369.5 ft) tall mountain Memaurtinden.

== Government ==
Gildeskål Municipality is responsible for primary education (through 10th grade), outpatient health services, senior citizen services, welfare and other social services, zoning, economic development, and municipal roads and utilities. The municipality is governed by a municipal council of directly elected representatives. The mayor is indirectly elected by a vote of the municipal council. The municipality is under the jurisdiction of the Salten og Lofoten District Court and the Hålogaland Court of Appeal.

=== Municipal council ===
The municipal council (Kommunestyre) of Gildeskål Municipality is made up of 17 representatives that are elected to four year terms. The tables below show the current and historical composition of the council by political party.

Gildeskål kommunestyre 2023–2027
Party name (in Norwegian)	Number of representatives
Labour Party (Arbeiderpartiet)	4
Progress Party (Fremskrittspartiet)	3
Conservative Party (Høyre)	4
Centre Party (Senterpartiet)	3
Socialist Left Party (Sosialistisk Venstreparti)	1
Gildeskål List (Gildeskållista)	2
Total number of members:	17

Gildeskål kommunestyre 2019–2023
Party name (in Norwegian)	Number of representatives
Labour Party (Arbeiderpartiet)	4
Progress Party (Fremskrittspartiet)	2
Conservative Party (Høyre)	3
Centre Party (Senterpartiet)	3
Socialist Left Party (Sosialistisk Venstreparti)	1
Gildeskål List (Gildeskållista)	4
Total number of members:	17

Gildeskål kommunestyre 2015–2019
Party name (in Norwegian)	Number of representatives
Labour Party (Arbeiderpartiet)	7
Progress Party (Fremskrittspartiet)	2
Conservative Party (Høyre)	3
Centre Party (Senterpartiet)	3
Socialist Left Party (Sosialistisk Venstreparti)	1
Joint list of the Liberal Party (Venstre) and Christian Democratic Party (Kristelig Folkeparti)	1
Total number of members:	17

Gildeskål kommunestyre 2011–2015
Party name (in Norwegian)	Number of representatives
Labour Party (Arbeiderpartiet)	5
Progress Party (Fremskrittspartiet)	3
Conservative Party (Høyre)	3
Centre Party (Senterpartiet)	2
Socialist Left Party (Sosialistisk Venstreparti)	1
Liberal Party (Venstre)	2
Arnøy List (Arnøylista)	1
Total number of members:	17

Gildeskål kommunestyre 2007–2011
Party name (in Norwegian)	Number of representatives
Labour Party (Arbeiderpartiet)	4
Progress Party (Fremskrittspartiet)	3
Conservative Party (Høyre)	3
Christian Democratic Party (Kristelig Folkeparti)	1
Centre Party (Senterpartiet)	2
Socialist Left Party (Sosialistisk Venstreparti)	2
Liberal Party (Venstre)	2
Total number of members:	17

Gildeskål kommunestyre 2003–2007
Party name (in Norwegian)	Number of representatives
Labour Party (Arbeiderpartiet)	5
Progress Party (Fremskrittspartiet)	2
Conservative Party (Høyre)	3
Christian Democratic Party (Kristelig Folkeparti)	1
Coastal Party (Kystpartiet)	1
Centre Party (Senterpartiet)	1
Socialist Left Party (Sosialistisk Venstreparti)	1
Liberal Party (Venstre)	1
Gildeskål common list (Gildeskål Felleslister)	2
Total number of members:	17

Gildeskål kommunestyre 1999–2003
Party name (in Norwegian)	Number of representatives
Labour Party (Arbeiderpartiet)	8
Conservative Party (Høyre)	6
Christian Democratic Party (Kristelig Folkeparti)	3
Centre Party (Senterpartiet)	2
Liberal Party (Venstre)	2
Total number of members:	21

Gildeskål kommunestyre 1995–1999
Party name (in Norwegian)	Number of representatives
Labour Party (Arbeiderpartiet)	7
Conservative Party (Høyre)	5
Christian Democratic Party (Kristelig Folkeparti)	2
Centre Party (Senterpartiet)	5
Socialist Left Party (Sosialistisk Venstreparti)	1
Liberal Party (Venstre)	1
Total number of members:	21

Gildeskål kommunestyre 1991–1995
Party name (in Norwegian)	Number of representatives
Labour Party (Arbeiderpartiet)	7
Conservative Party (Høyre)	5
Christian Democratic Party (Kristelig Folkeparti)	2
Centre Party (Senterpartiet)	3
Socialist Left Party (Sosialistisk Venstreparti)	2
Liberal Party (Venstre)	2
Total number of members:	21

Gildeskål kommunestyre 1987–1991
Party name (in Norwegian)	Number of representatives
Labour Party (Arbeiderpartiet)	11
Conservative Party (Høyre)	6
Christian Democratic Party (Kristelig Folkeparti)	2
Centre Party (Senterpartiet)	1
Liberal Party (Venstre)	1
Total number of members:	21

Gildeskål kommunestyre 1983–1987
Party name (in Norwegian)	Number of representatives
Labour Party (Arbeiderpartiet)	11
Conservative Party (Høyre)	6
Christian Democratic Party (Kristelig Folkeparti)	2
Centre Party (Senterpartiet)	1
Liberal Party (Venstre)	1
Total number of members:	21

Gildeskål kommunestyre 1979–1983
Party name (in Norwegian)	Number of representatives
Labour Party (Arbeiderpartiet)	11
Conservative Party (Høyre)	7
Christian Democratic Party (Kristelig Folkeparti)	3
Centre Party (Senterpartiet)	3
Liberal Party (Venstre)	1
Total number of members:	25

Gildeskål kommunestyre 1975–1979
Party name (in Norwegian)	Number of representatives
Labour Party (Arbeiderpartiet)	12
Conservative Party (Høyre)	4
Christian Democratic Party (Kristelig Folkeparti)	3
Centre Party (Senterpartiet)	5
Liberal Party (Venstre)	1
Total number of members:	25

Gildeskål kommunestyre 1971–1975
Party name (in Norwegian)	Number of representatives
Labour Party (Arbeiderpartiet)	10
Conservative Party (Høyre)	2
Christian Democratic Party (Kristelig Folkeparti)	2
Centre Party (Senterpartiet)	4
Socialist People's Party (Sosialistisk Folkeparti)	1
Liberal Party (Venstre)	3
Local List(s) (Lokale lister)	3
Total number of members:	25

Gildeskål kommunestyre 1967–1971
Party name (in Norwegian)	Number of representatives
Labour Party (Arbeiderpartiet)	13
Conservative Party (Høyre)	3
Christian Democratic Party (Kristelig Folkeparti)	3
Centre Party (Senterpartiet)	2
Socialist People's Party (Sosialistisk Folkeparti)	1
Liberal Party (Venstre)	3
Total number of members:	25

Gildeskål kommunestyre 1963–1967
Party name (in Norwegian)	Number of representatives
Labour Party (Arbeiderpartiet)	11
Christian Democratic Party (Kristelig Folkeparti)	3
Liberal Party (Venstre)	2
List of workers, fishermen, and small farmholders (Arbeidere, fiskere, småbrukere liste)	4
Local List(s) (Lokale lister)	5
Total number of members:	25

Gildeskål herredsstyre 1959–1963
Party name (in Norwegian)	Number of representatives
Labour Party (Arbeiderpartiet)	10
Christian Democratic Party (Kristelig Folkeparti)	2
Liberal Party (Venstre)	1
List of workers, fishermen, and small farmholders (Arbeidere, fiskere, småbrukere liste)	3
Local List(s) (Lokale lister)	9
Total number of members:	25

Gildeskål herredsstyre 1955–1959
Party name (in Norwegian)	Number of representatives
Labour Party (Arbeiderpartiet)	14
Christian Democratic Party (Kristelig Folkeparti)	3
Liberal Party (Venstre)	1
Joint List(s) of Non-Socialist Parties (Borgerlige Felleslister)	7
Total number of members:	25

Gildeskål herredsstyre 1951–1955
Party name (in Norwegian)	Number of representatives
Labour Party (Arbeiderpartiet)	12
Christian Democratic Party (Kristelig Folkeparti)	3
Liberal Party (Venstre)	2
Joint List(s) of Non-Socialist Parties (Borgerlige Felleslister)	7
Total number of members:	24

Gildeskål herredsstyre 1947–1951
Party name (in Norwegian)	Number of representatives
Labour Party (Arbeiderpartiet)	13
Christian Democratic Party (Kristelig Folkeparti)	2
Liberal Party (Venstre)	2
Joint List(s) of Non-Socialist Parties (Borgerlige Felleslister)	7
Total number of members:	24

Gildeskål herredsstyre 1945–1947
Party name (in Norwegian)	Number of representatives
Labour Party (Arbeiderpartiet)	16
Liberal Party (Venstre)	2
Joint List(s) of Non-Socialist Parties (Borgerlige Felleslister)	5
Local List(s) (Lokale lister)	1
Total number of members:	24

Gildeskål herredsstyre 1937–1941*
Party name (in Norwegian)	Number of representatives
Labour Party (Arbeiderpartiet)	11
Liberal Party (Venstre)	3
Joint List(s) of Non-Socialist Parties (Borgerlige Felleslister)	8
Local List(s) (Lokale lister)	2
Total number of members:	24
Note: Due to the German occupation of Norway during World War II, no elections were held for new municipal councils until after the war ended in 1945.

=== Mayors ===
The mayor (Norwegian: ordfører) of Gildeskål Municipality is the political leader of the municipality and the chairperson of the municipal council. Here is a list of people who have held this position:

- 1838–1847: Stein Eilert Berner
- 1848–1849: Ole Helgesen
- 1850–1851: Peder H. Berg
- 1852–1860: Edvard Pedersen
- 1860–1862: Hans Henrik Holck Daae
- 1863–1866: Jørgen Blix
- 1867–1868: Hans Henrik Holck Daae
- 1869–1870: Hans Olsen
- 1871–1872: Eilert Nicolai Friis
- 1873–1876: Hans Hansen
- 1877–1878: Abel Ellingsen
- 1879–1882: Hans Hansen
- 1883–1884: Christoffer Arntzen
- 1885–1888: Hans Hansen
- 1889–1894: Håkon Hansen
- 1895–1910: O. Laugsand
- 1911–1913: Paulius Danielsen
- 1914–1919: Jens Johansen
- 1920–1922: Daniel Johan Eilertsen
- 1923–1925: Johan Nilsen-Nygaard
- 1926–1926: Daniel Johan Eilertsen
- 1927–1928: Øyvind Heen
- 1929–1940: Peder Johnsen
- 1941–1941: Øyvind Heen
- 1941–1945: Lars Norum
- 1945–1945: Peder Johnsen
- 1946–1947: Astrup Johansen
- 1948–1958: Reidar Juliussen Myrhaug
- 1958–1961: Magnus Sundsfjord
- 1962–1963: Øivind Kaspersen
- 1964–1969: Meyer Madsen
- 1970–1971: Rolf Fagermo
- 1972–1972: Meyer Madsen
- 1972–1975: Andreas Opsahl
- 1976–1979: Håkon Willumsen
- 1980–1981: Harald Joakimsen
- 1982–1983: Svein Christensen
- 1984–1995: Roger Granberg (Ap)
- 1995–1999: Jon Gisle Karlsen
- 1999–2003: Gunnar T. Skjellvik (Ap)
- 2003–2011: Walter Pedersen (H)
- 2011–2019: Petter Jørgen Pedersen (Ap)
- 2019–present: Bjørn Magne Pedersen (H)

== Buildings and structures ==
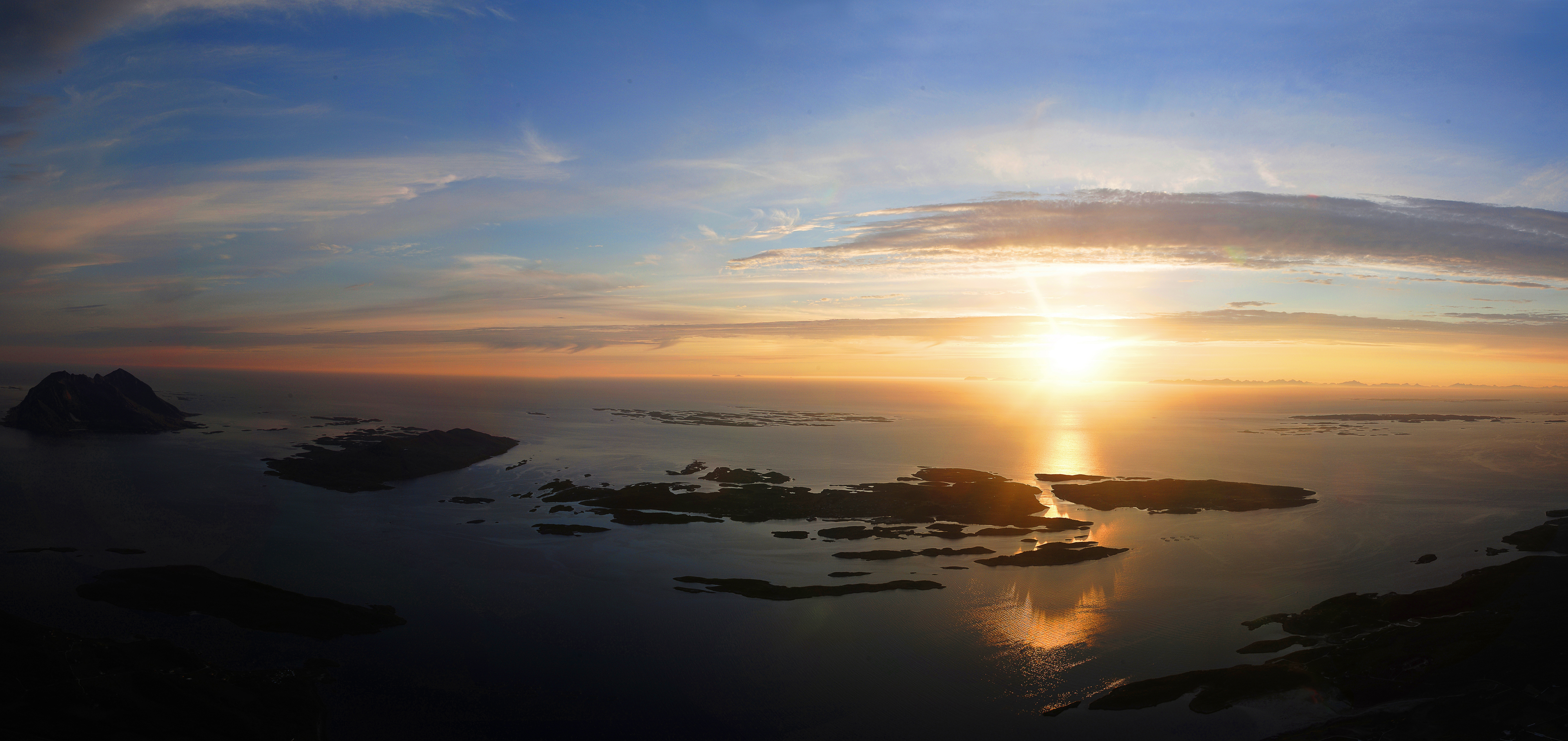
View from Sandhornøya, in Gildeskål

Sandhornøy Bridge connects the island of Sandhornøya to the mainland. The Kjellingstraumen Bridge crosses the outer end of the Beiar Fjord.

There is a VLF-transmitter in Gildeskål that is used for sending messages to submerged submarines (call sign: JXN, frequency: 16.4 kHz). It uses as antenna multiple wires spun between two mountains (photo). The transmitter building is located at 66°58′58″N 13°52′23″E.

== Notable people ==
- Elias Blix (1836–1902), a professor, theologian, hymn writer, and politician
- Harald Sund (1876–1940), an architect, artist, and illustrator
- Håvard Lund (born 1970), a jazz musician (clarinet and saxophone) and composer
