= Fleina =

Island in Nordland, Norway

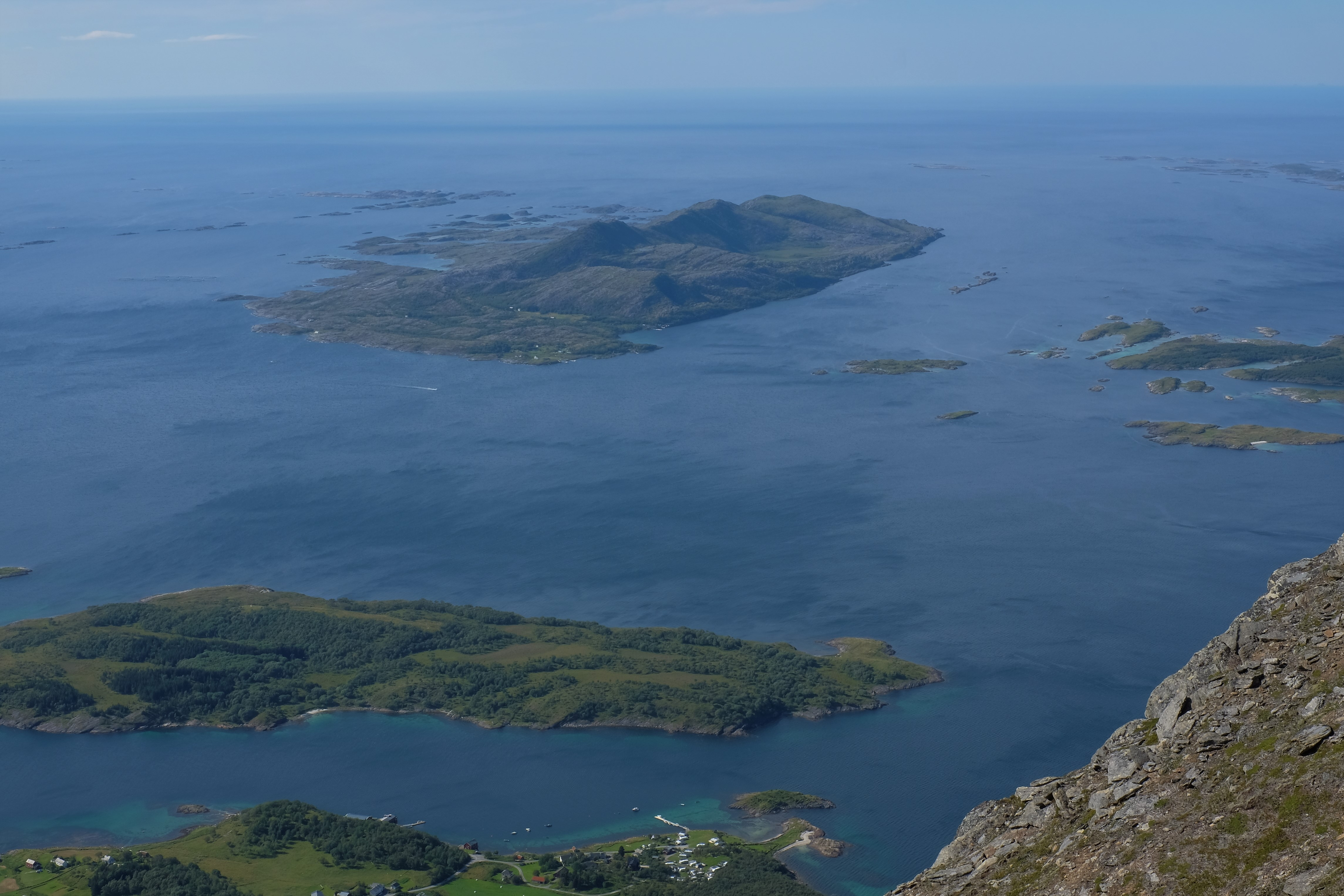
- Interactive map of Fleina

Geography
- Location: Nordland, Norway
- Coordinates: 67.1128°N 13.8773°E
- Area: 8 km^{2} (3.1 sq mi)
- Highest elevation: 225 m (738 ft)
- Highest point: Troll

Administration
- Norway
- County: Nordland
- Municipality: Gildeskål Municipality

Fleina is an island in Gildeskål Municipality in Nordland county, Norway. The 8-square-kilometre (3.1 sq mi) island lies in the Fleinværfjorden, between the islands of Fugløya and Sør-Arnøya. The island of Sandhornøya lies to the east and the mainland lies to the southeast.

== See also ==
- List of islands of Norway
