= Gildeskål Church =

Church in Nordland, Norway

- Gildeskål hovedkirke
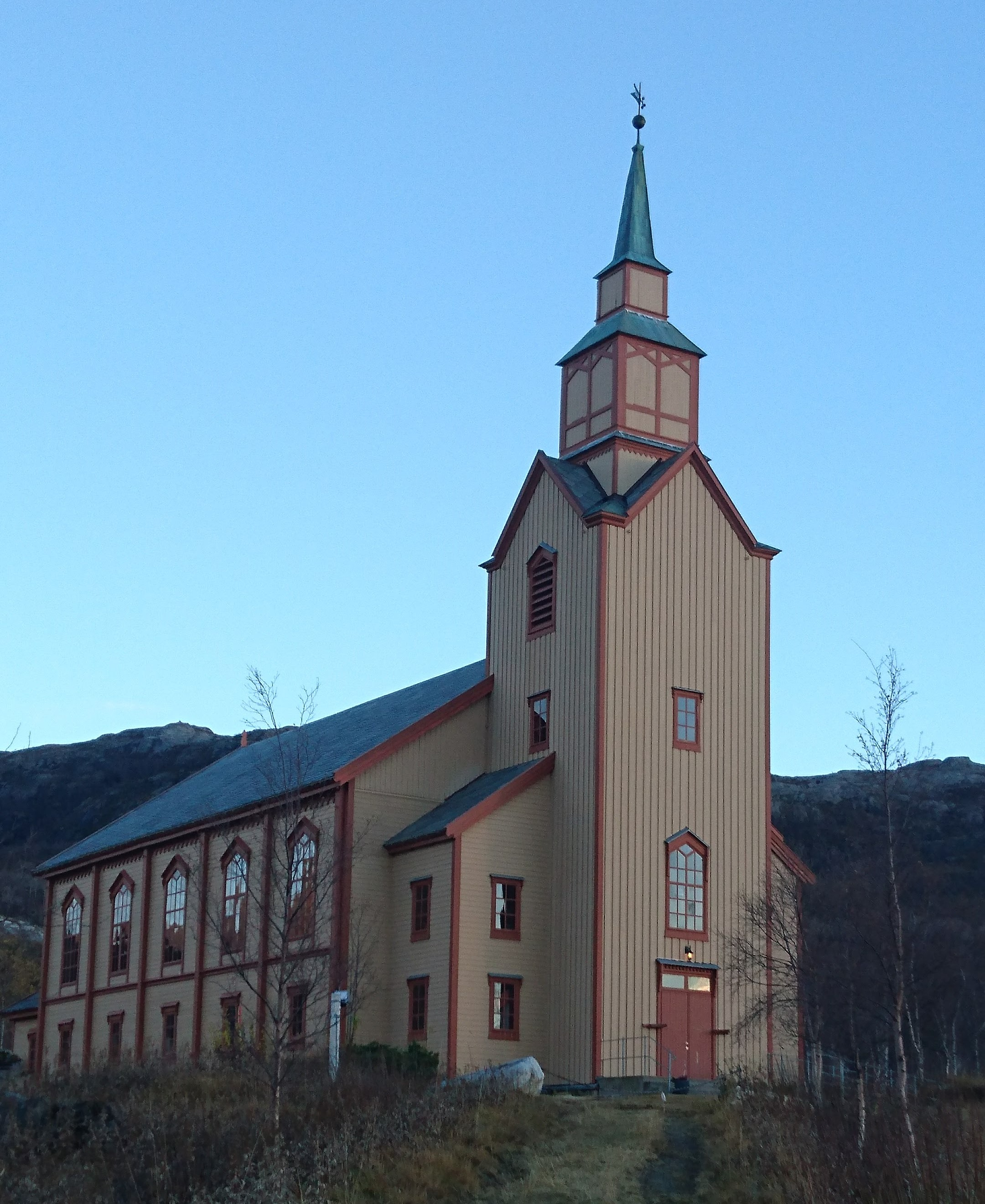
- View of the church
- Gildeskål Church
- 67.0591051°N 14.0426940°E
- Location: Gildeskål Municipality, Nordland
- Country: Norway
- Denomination: Church of Norway
- Churchmanship: Evangelical Lutheran

History
- Status: Parish church
- Founded: 1881 (145 years ago)
- Consecrated: 1881 (145 years ago)

Architecture
- Functional status: Active
- Architect: Carl J. Bergstrøm
- Architectural type: Long church
- Style: Neo-Gothic
- Completed: 1881 (145 years ago)

Specifications
- Capacity: 750
- Materials: Wood

Administration
- Diocese: Sør-Hålogaland
- Deanery: Bodø domprosti
- Parish: Gildeskål
- Norwegian Cultural Heritage Site
- Type: Church
- Status: Listed
- ID: 84239

Gildeskål Church (Norwegian: Gildeskål hovedkirke) is a parish church of the Church of Norway in Gildeskål Municipality in Nordland county, Norway. It is located just north of the village of Inndyr. It is the main church for the Gildeskål parish which is part of the Bodø domprosti (deanery) in the Diocese of Sør-Hålogaland. The orange-colored, wooden, neo-Gothic church was built in a long church style in 1881 using plans drawn up by the architect Carl J. Bergstrøm. The church seats about 750 people.

== History ==
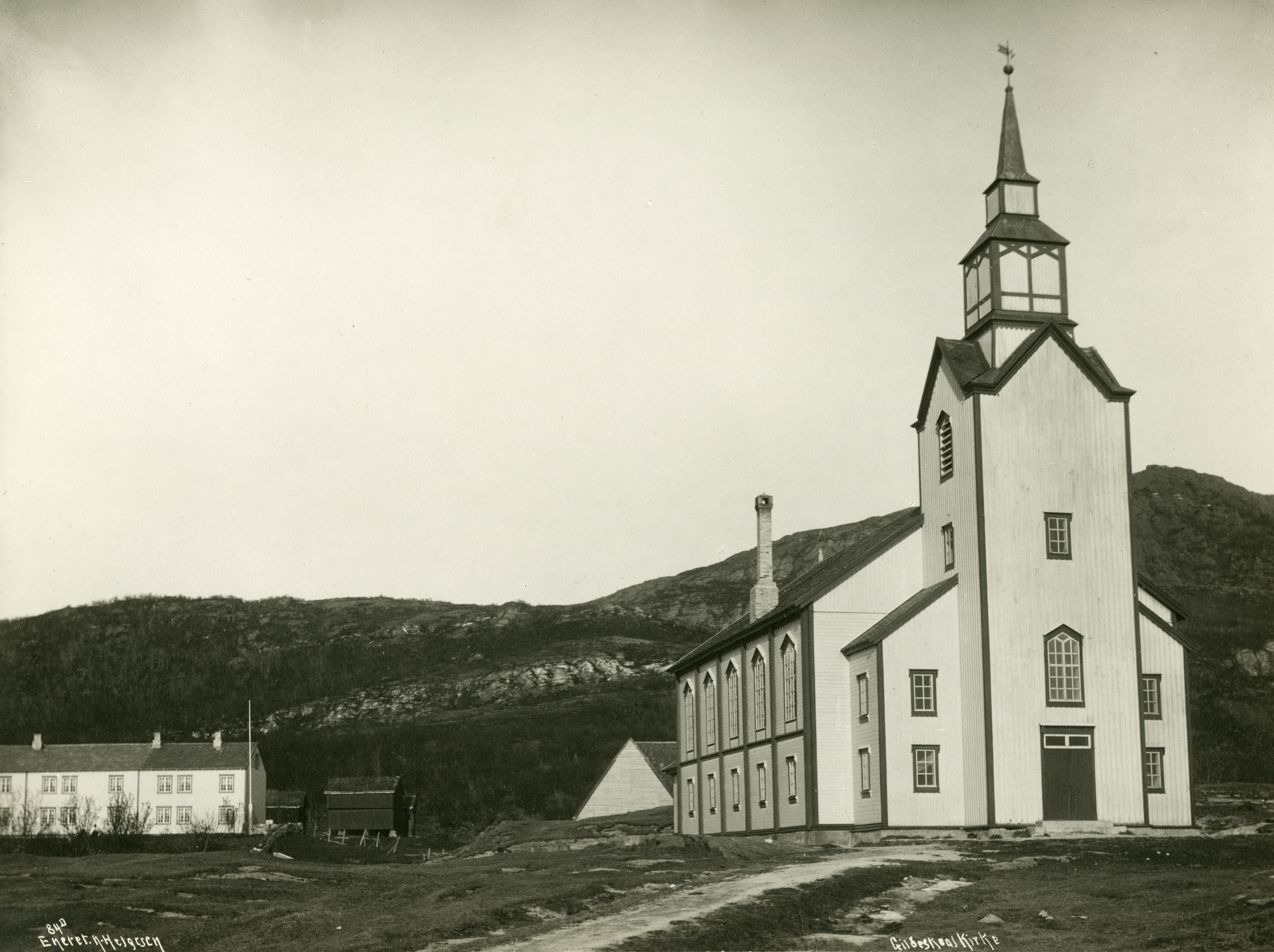
View of the church (c. 1880)

In 1851, a new law was passed that said that all rural churches had to be able to fit at least 30% of the parish members in the church building. Since the Old Gildeskål Church was too small, a new church had to be built for the parish. It was decided that the new church would be built about 100 metres (330 ft) west of the old church. The new church was completed in 1881 and it seated about 750 people.

== See also ==
- List of churches in Sør-Hålogaland
