= Indre Sunnan Bridge =

Indre Sunnan Bridge Indre Sunnan bru Sunnanbrua
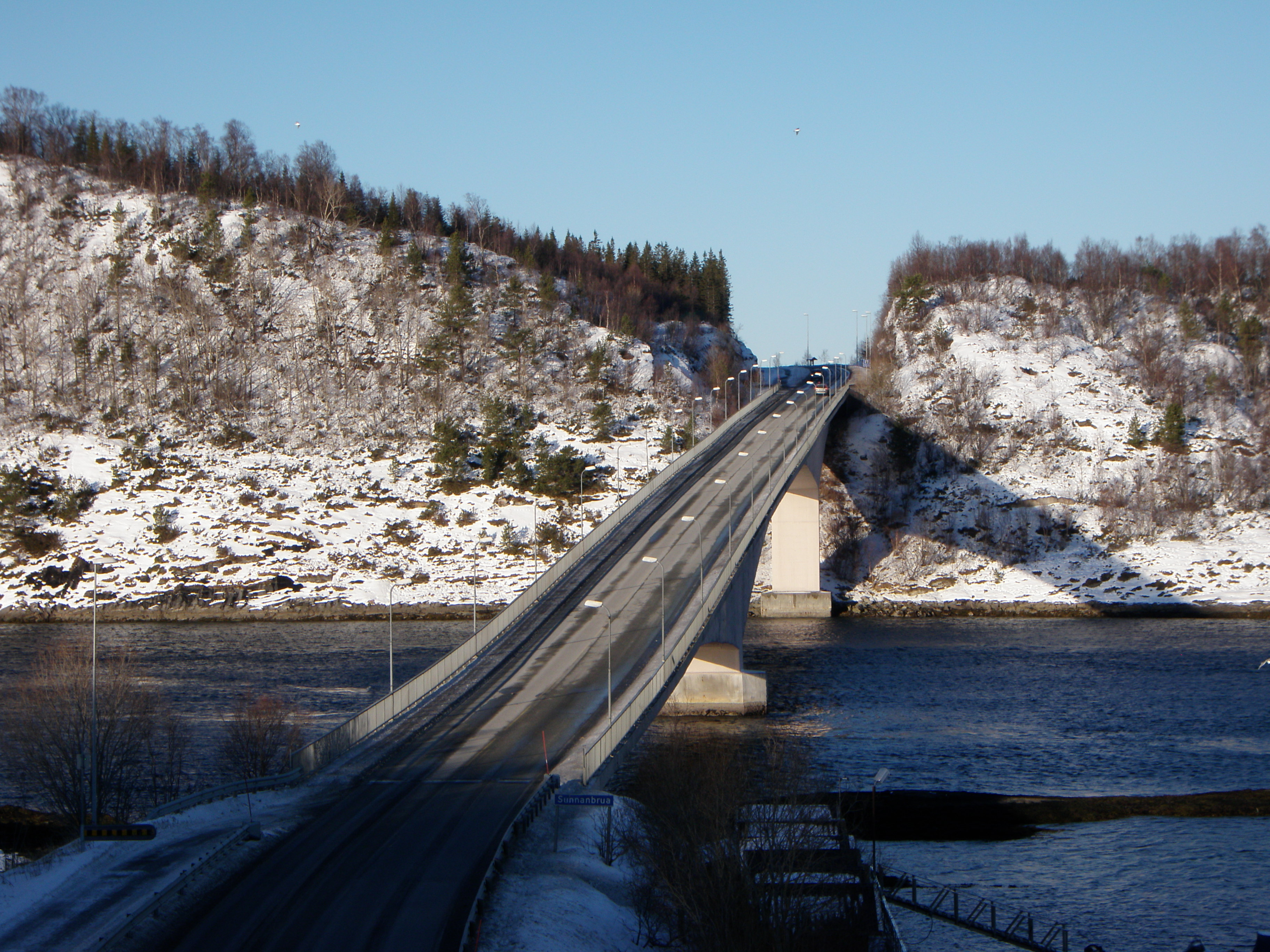
- View of the bridge
- Coordinates: 67°13′21″N 14°36′45″E
- Carries: Fv17
- Locale: Bodø, Norway

Characteristics
- Design: Cantilever bridge
- Total length: 360 metres (1,180 ft)
- Longest span: 165 metres (541 ft)

Location
- Interactive map of Indre Sunnan Bridge

The Indre Sunnan Bridge (Norwegian: Indre Sunnan bru) is a cantilever bridge in Bodø Municipality in Nordland county, Norway. It crosses a strait between the island of Straumøya and the village of Tuv on the mainland. The Saltstraumen strait and its famous maelstrom lie just a short distance to the northeast. The bridge is 360 metres (1,180 ft) long and the main span is 165 metres (541 ft).

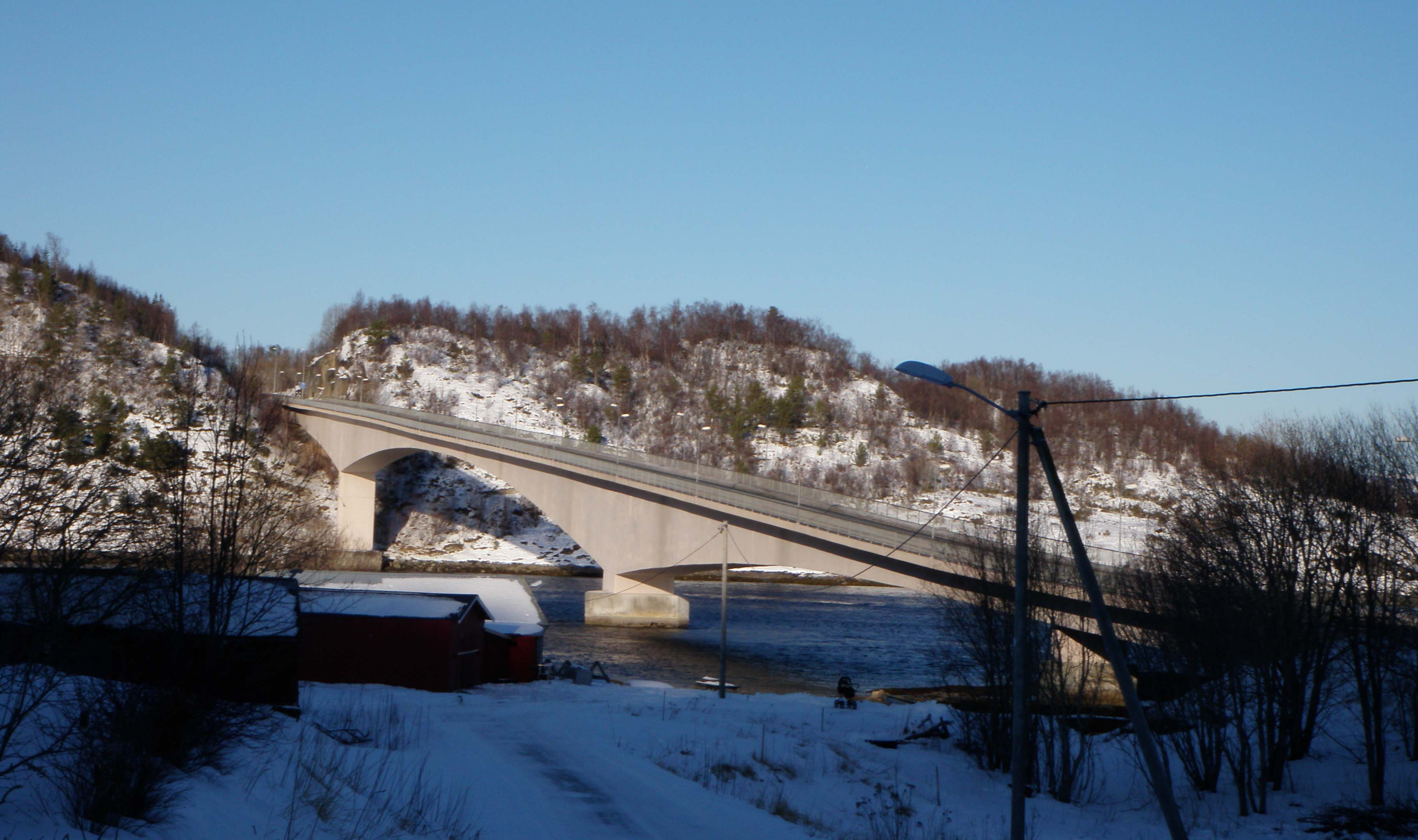
Side view of the bridge

== See also ==
- List of bridges in Norway
- Saltstraumen Bridge
