= Saltstraumen Bridge =

Saltstraumen Bridge Saltstraumen bru
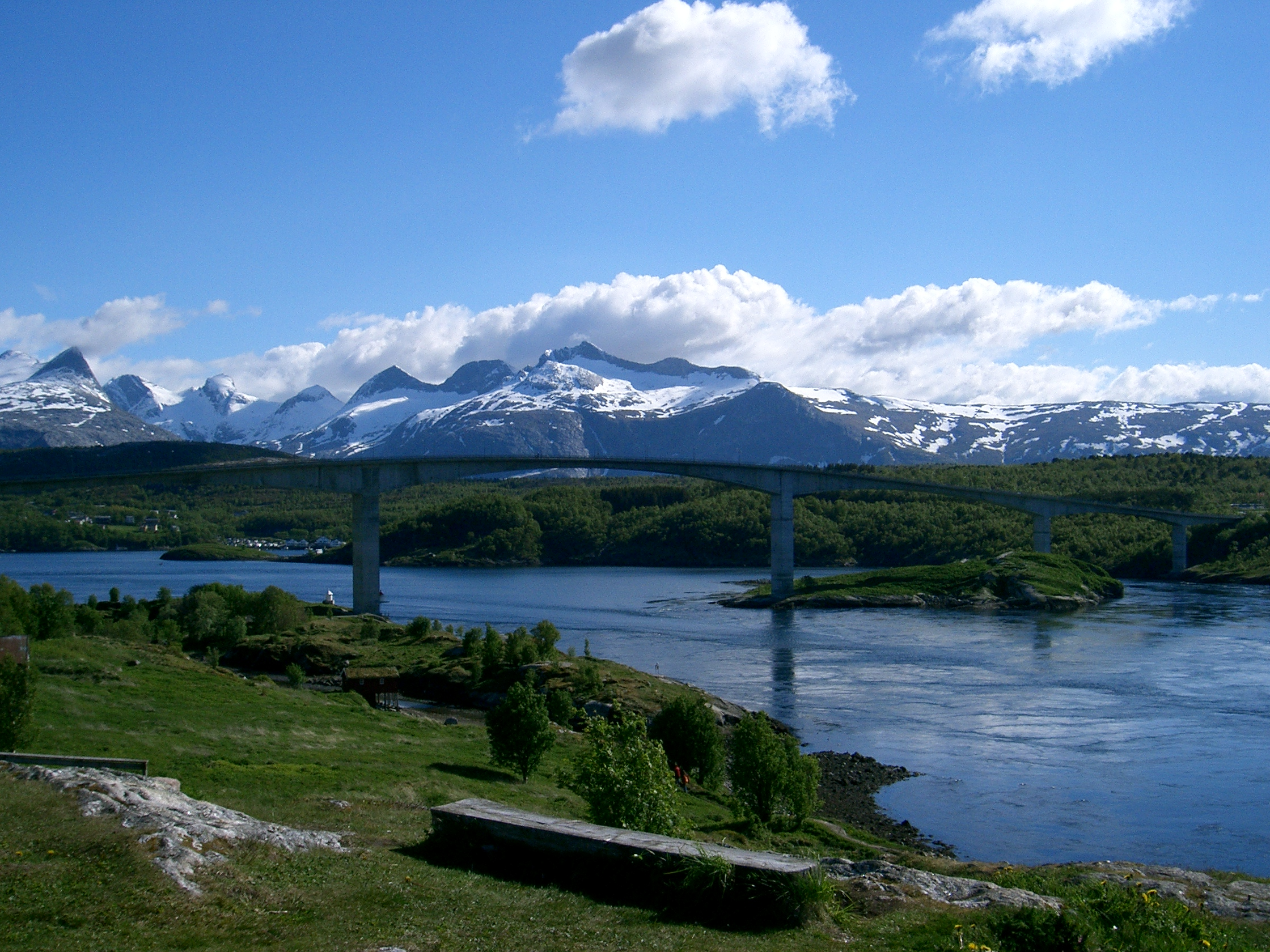
- Saltstraumen with the Saltstraumen Bridge and the Børvasstindan mountains
- Coordinates: 67°13′51″N 14°36′41″E
- Carries: Fv17
- Crosses: Saltstraumen
- Locale: Bodø, Norway

Characteristics
- Design: Cantilever bridge
- Material: Concrete
- Total length: 768 metres (2,520 ft)
- Width: 11.3 metres (37 ft)
- Longest span: 160 metres (520 ft)
- No. of spans: 10
- Clearance above: 41 metres (135 ft)

History
- Construction cost: 25 million kr
- Opened: 1977

Location
- Interactive map of Saltstraumen Bridge

The Saltstraumen Bridge (Norwegian: Saltstraumen bru) is a cantilever box girder bridge that crosses the Saltstraumen strait between the islands of Knaplundsøya and Straumøya in Bodø Municipality in Nordland county, Norway. The bridge spans across the Saltfjorden from the town of Bodø.

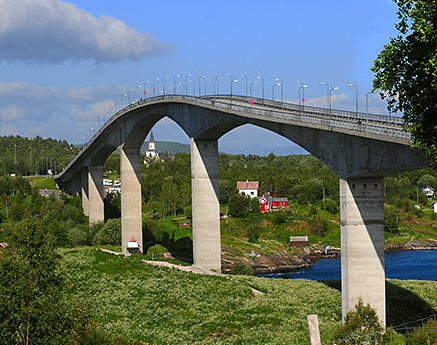
The Saltstraumen Bridge

The bridge is 768 metres (2,520 ft) long, the longest of the 10 spans is 160 metres (520 ft), and the maximum clearance to the sea is 41 metres (135 ft). The bridge is made of prestressed concrete. Saltstraumen Bridge was opened in 1978.

== See also ==
- List of bridges in Norway
- List of bridges in Norway by length
- List of bridges
- List of bridges by length
