= Straumøya =

Island in Nordland, Norway

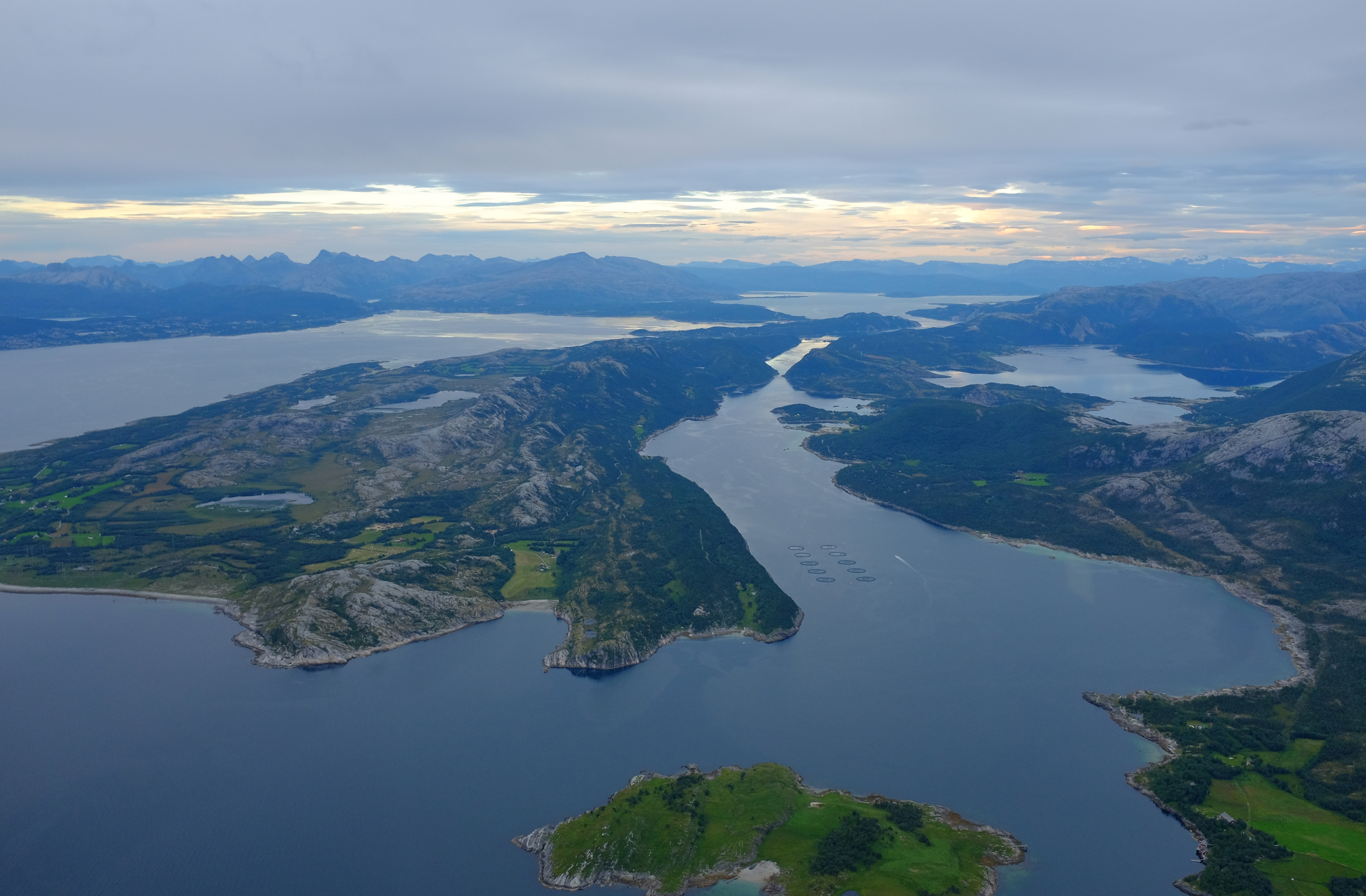
- Interactive map of Straumøya

Geography
- Location: Nordland, Norway
- Coordinates: 67.2121°N 14.4653°E
- Area: 29.7 km^{2} (11.5 sq mi)
- Length: 12 km (7.5 mi)
- Width: 3 km (1.9 mi)
- Highest elevation: 260 m (850 ft)
- Highest point: Varden

Administration
- Norway
- County: Nordland
- Municipality: Bodø Municipality

Demographics
- Population: 278 (2016)

Straumøya is an island in Bodø Municipality in Nordland county, Norway. The 29.7-square-kilometre (11.5 sq mi) island is located on the south side of the Saltfjorden, just west of the Saltstraumen strait. The island is connected to the mainland by the Indre Sunnan Bridge and to the nearby island Knaplundsøya by the Saltstraumen Bridge, both bridges are a part of Norwegian County Road 17. In 2016, the island had 278 residents.

The island has the Seinesodden Nature Reserve and the village of Seines with its associated surfing spot.

== See also ==
- List of islands of Norway
