= Sandhornøya =

Island in Nordland, Norway

Sandhornøya Sandhornøy
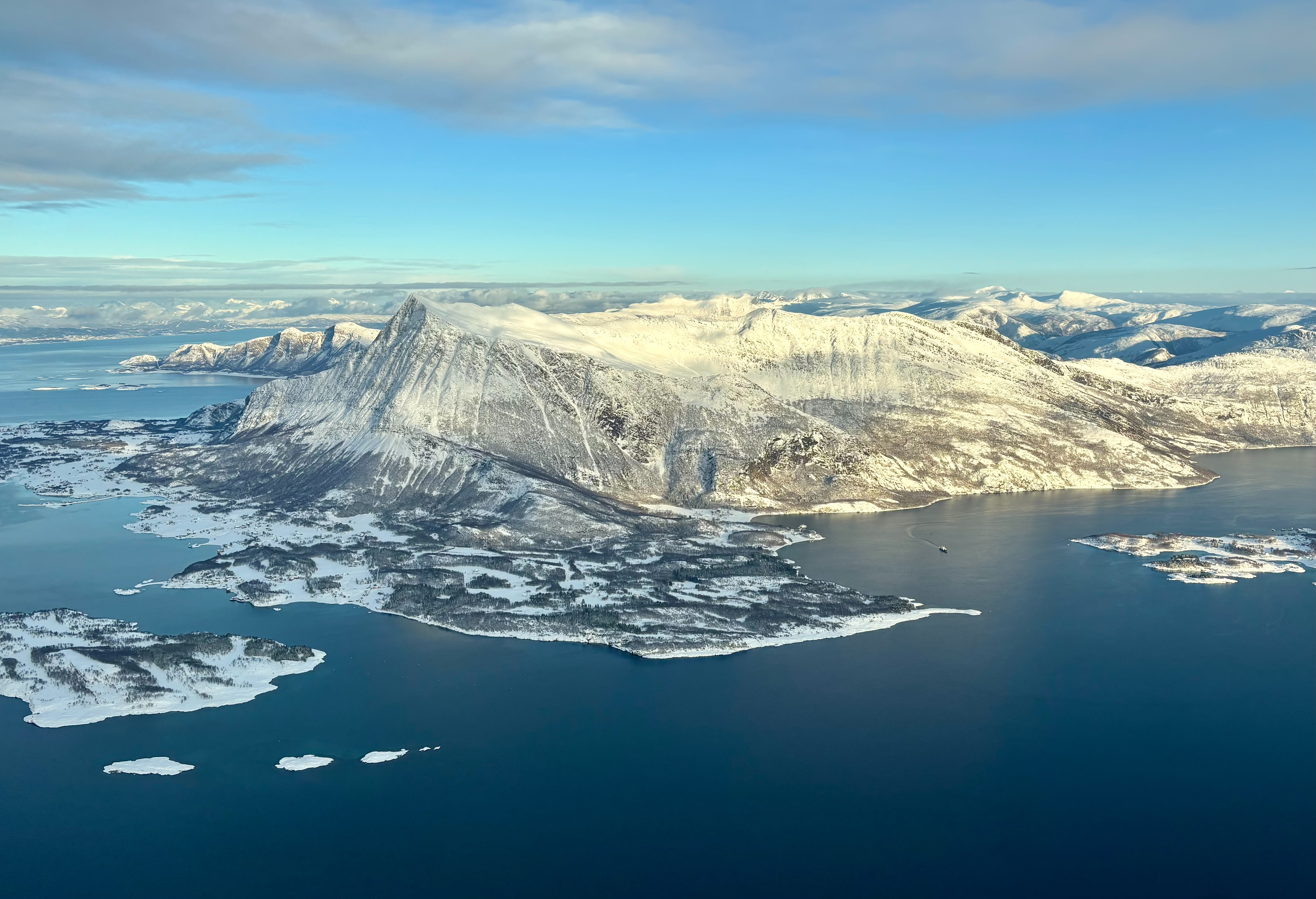
- Interactive map of Sandhornøya; Sandhornøy

Geography
- Location: Nordland, Norway
- Coordinates: 67.1035°N 14.0760°E
- Area: 103 km^{2} (40 sq mi)
- Length: 22 km (13.7 mi)
- Width: 8.5 km (5.28 mi)
- Highest elevation: 993 m (3258 ft)
- Highest point: Sandhornet

Administration
- Norway
- County: Nordland
- Municipality: Gildeskål Municipality

Demographics
- Population: 345 (2016)
- Pop. density: 3.3/km^{2} (8.5/sq mi)

Sandhornøya is a mountainous island in Gildeskål Municipality in Nordland county, Norway. The 103-square-kilometre (40 sq mi) island is located south of the town of Bodø near the entrance to the Saltfjorden. The mainland of Norway lies to the east and the islands of Fleina, Sør-Arnøya, and Nord-Arnøya lie to the west. The villages of Lekanger, Mårnes, and Våg are located on the island. The island is connected to the mainland by the Sandhornøy Bridge. Sandhornøya is also the birthplace of famous Norwegian professor and hymn writer, Elias Blix. A memorial monument of Blix can be seen by the coastline.

== Salt festival ==
On August 29, 2014, the Salt festival was held on a western beach on Sandhornøya. It included three architectural structures that were built on the beach and were inspired by the historic fish racks of Northern Norway. The Finnish architect Sami Rintala designed them. In one of the fish rack buildings, the Chinese artist Yang Fudong created a site specific outdoor film installation for the beach.

== See also ==
- List of islands of Norway
