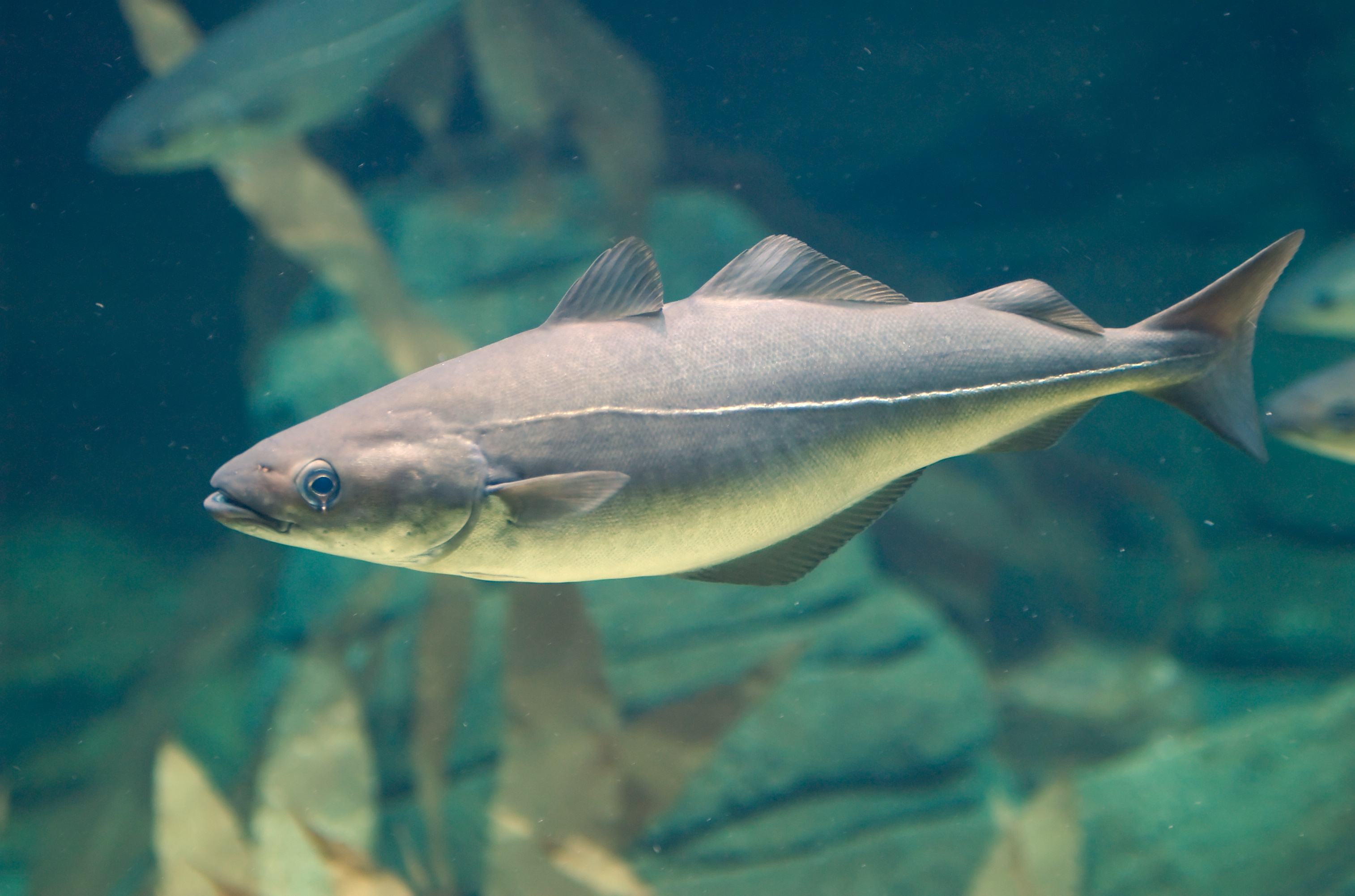
- At Ozeaneum

Scientific classification
- Kingdom: Animalia
- Phylum: Chordata
- Class: Actinopterygii
- Division: Teleostei
- Order: Gadiformes
- Family: Gadidae
- Genus: Pollachius
- Species: P. virens

Binomial name
- Pollachius virens (Linnaeus, 1758)

Synonyms
- List: Gadus virens Linnaeus, 1758; Merlangus virens (Linnaeus, 1758); Gadus carbonarius Linnaeus, 1758; Merlangus carbonarius (Linnaeus, 1758); Pollachius carbonarius (Linnaeus, 1758); Gadus colinus Lacépède, 1800; Gadus sey Lacepède, 1800; Gadus purpureus Mitchill, 1814; Merlangus purpureus (Mitchill, 1814)

= Pollachius virens =

Saithe

Species of fish

Pollachius virens is a species of marine fish in the genus Pollachius. Together with P. pollachius, it is generally referred to in the United States as pollock. It is commonly known in Britain as the coalfish, coley, or saithe (/seɪð/ or /seɪθ/), and the young fish may also be called podleys or cuddies in Scotland and northern England.

== Distribution and habitat ==
It is common in the northern parts of the Northern Atlantic, including the Bay of Biscay. Juveniles tend to be found close to shore, particularly in rocky areas, and tend to move out into deeper waters as they grow.

== Description ==
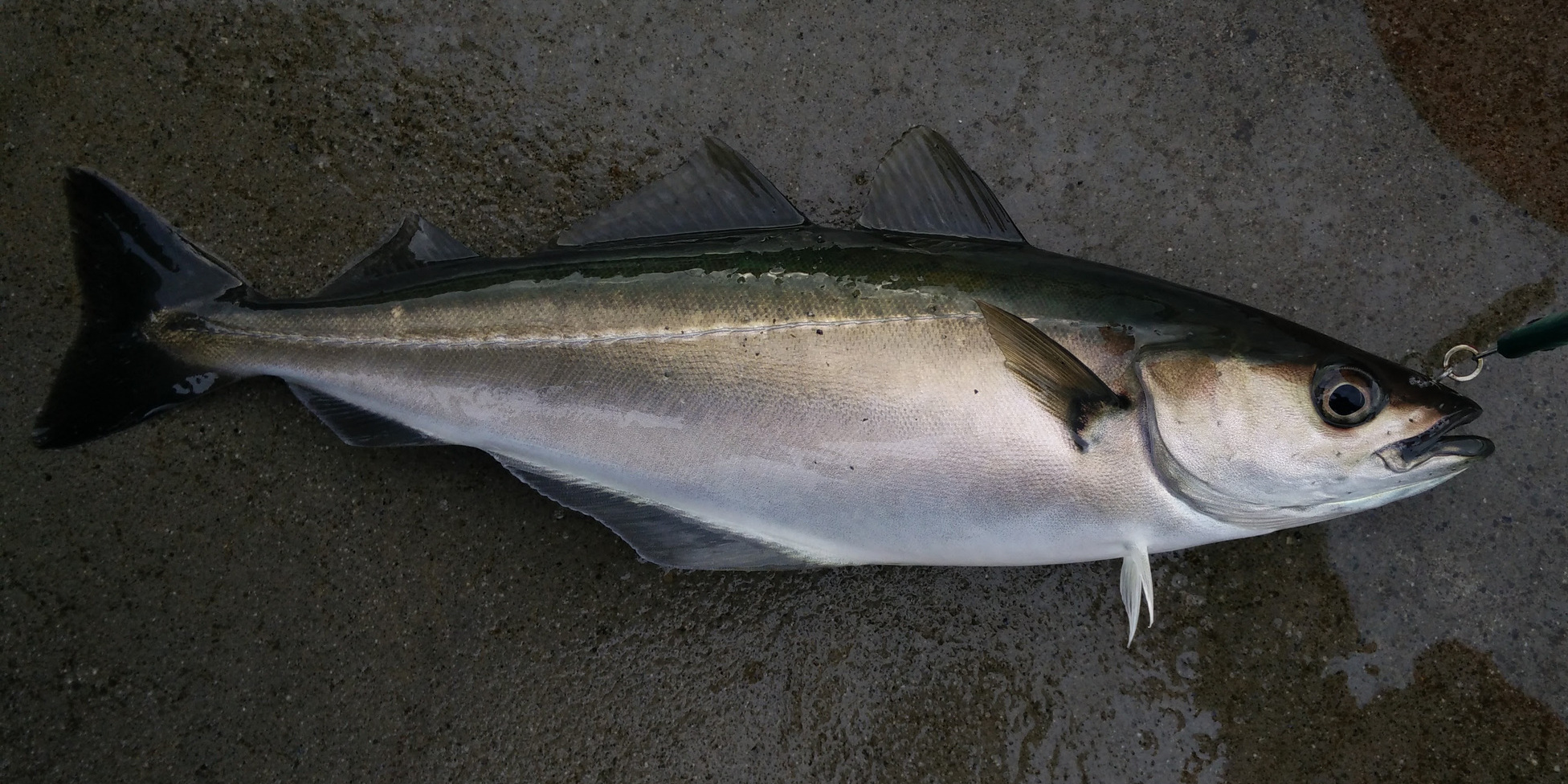
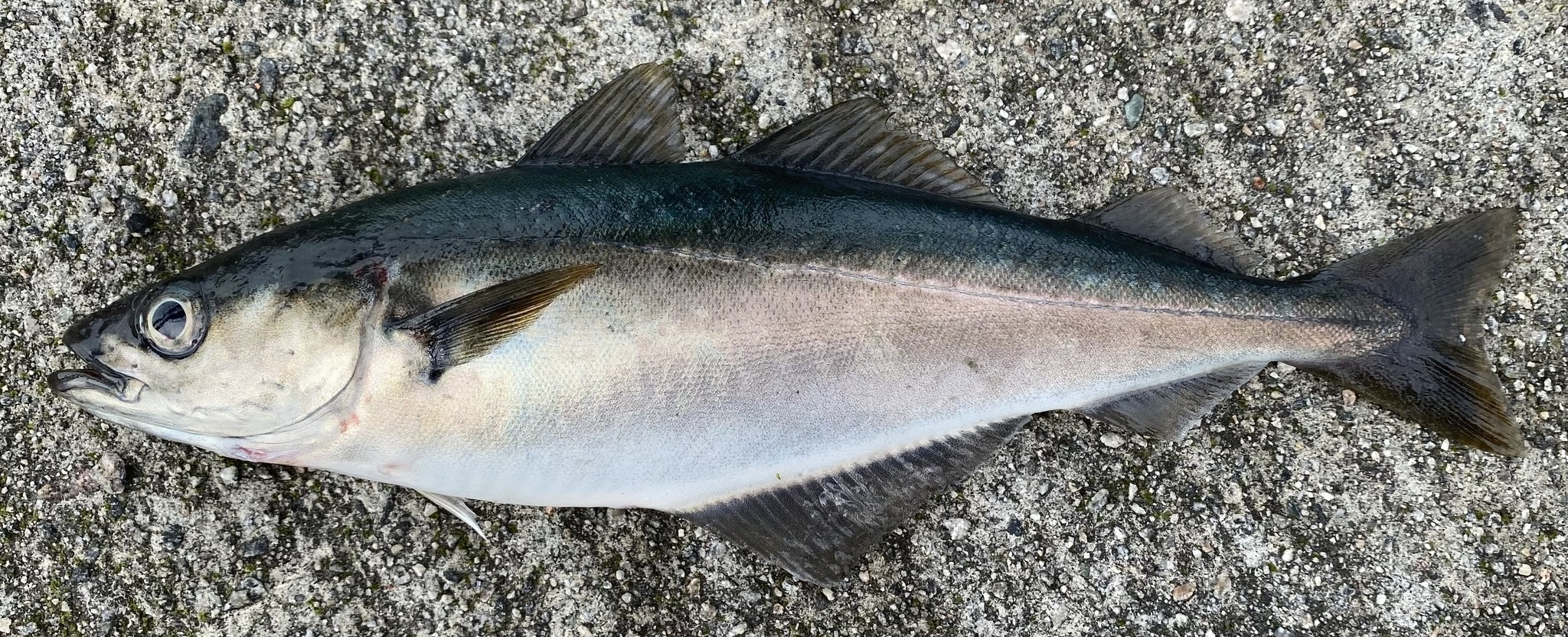
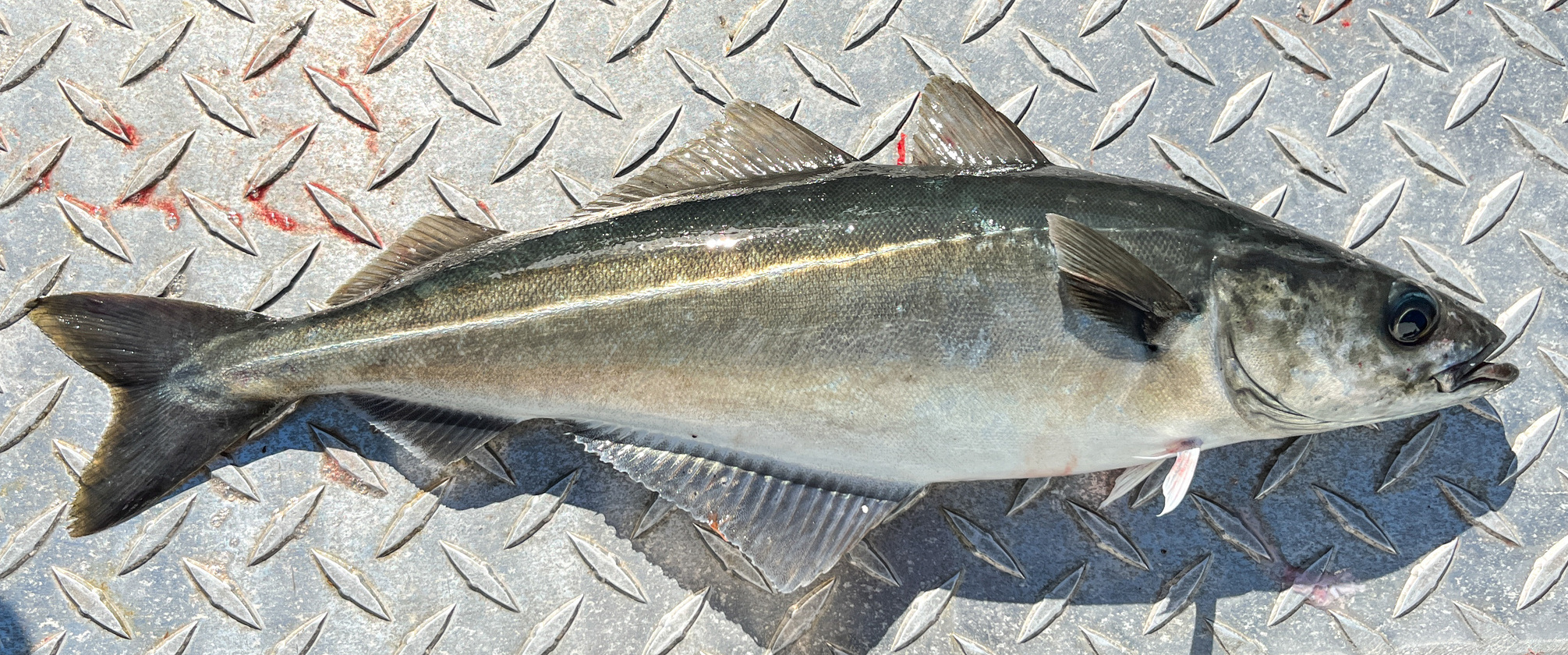
P. virens in Norway

This species can be separated from P. pollachius by looking at the relative lengths of the upper and lower jaws. P. pollachius has a longer underslung lower jaw while P. virens has approximately equal upper and lower jaw lengths. This gives a very different profile to the head. In general, P. pollachius is a brown or golden colour with a dark back while P. virens is bright silver with a very dark green back. P. virens generally appears to have relatively smaller eyes. The lateral line of P. pollachius has a noticeable kink over the pectoral fins while that of P. virens is straighter.

Adults can typically live up to 16–20 years and grow to 100–120 centimetres (40–45 in) but individuals up to 130 cm (50 in) and weight up to 32 kg (71 lb) have been caught. The current IGFA All-Tackle World Record is 22.7 kilograms (50 lb 1 oz) which was caught at Saltstraumen in Norway.

== Reproduction ==
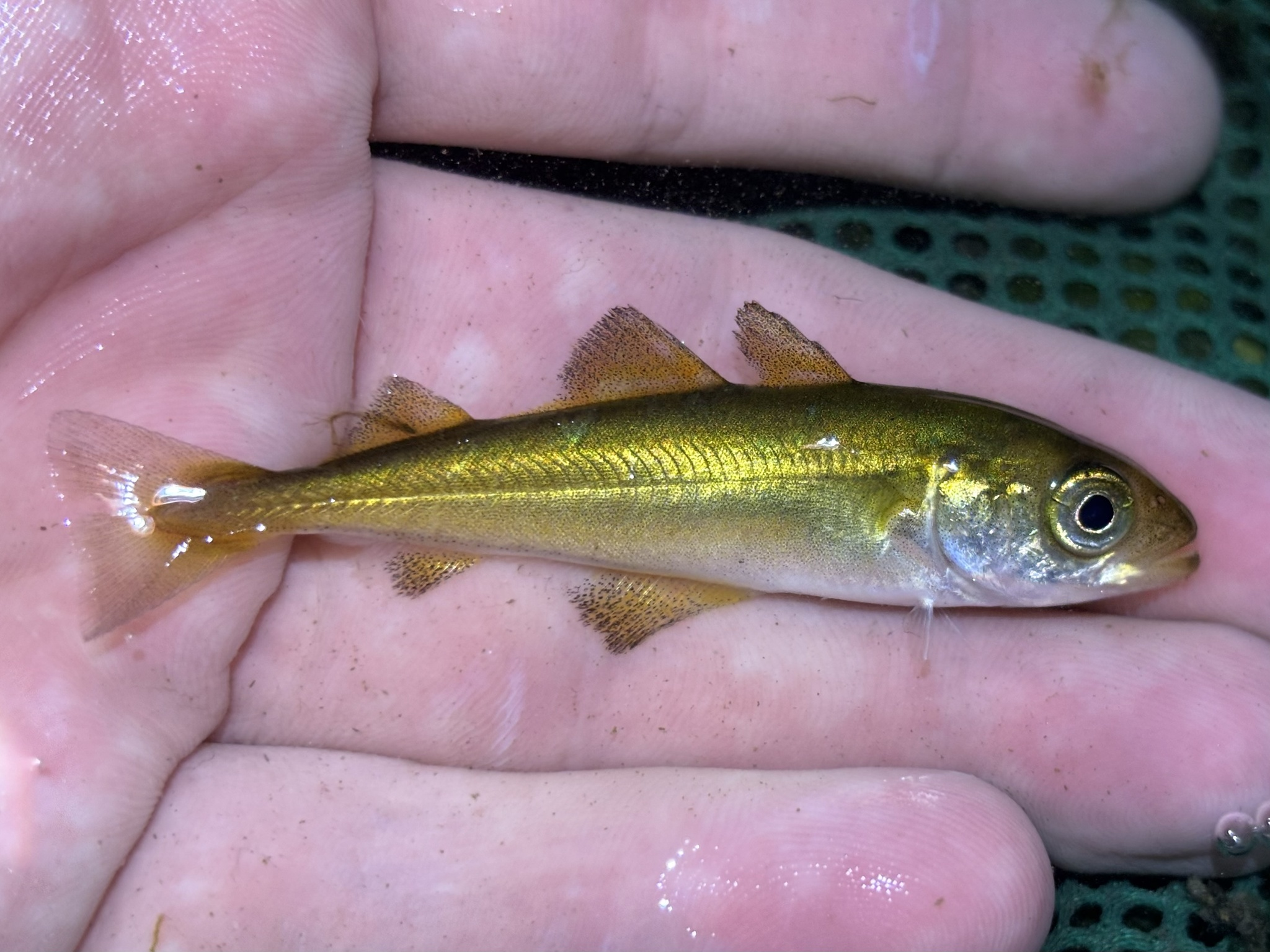
Juvenile in New Jersey (USA)

Saithe reach sexual maturity at 4–9 years old and are iteroparous, batch spawners with determinate fecundity. Females produce, depending on their size, between 500 thousand and 9 million eggs which are 1.0 to 1.3 millimetres (5/128 to 7/128 in) in diameter.

== As food ==
Coalfish is edible and has commercial value, although it is considerably less valuable than premium whitefish such as cod and haddock. To achieve a salmon-like orange color, it can be salted and smoked. In Germany, the fish is commonly sold as Seelachs (literally 'sea salmon'), although it is not closely related to any salmon.

While a great deal of saithe consumed in Europe are caught in British waters, it is not a popular fish with consumers there. Most of the British saithe catch is thus exported to France, where it is widely eaten.

The flesh of coalfish (P. virens) is darkly coloured (hence the common name) while that of P. pollachius is similar to other members of the cod family. This dark colour in the fresh uncooked flesh may have led to the undeserved reputation of this fish as poor for eating.

Saithe often congregate around fish farms and feed on uneaten salmon feeds which have passed through the net walls of the cages. It is the opinion of fishermen that the fish caught close to fish farms is of poor quality. Quality testing shows that there is relatively minor difference in fillet quality between fish which were caught close to fish farms and those that were not; however, catches taken close to fish farms have a higher proportion of fish of poor quality. There is a detectable difference in taste between saithe associated and not associated with fish farms, but there are conflicting results on which tastes better and it is probably a matter of consumer preference.

Along with the more commonly used cod and alaska pollock, fish fingers can be made using saithe. Saithe is also used as food for domestic cats.

== Fisheries ==
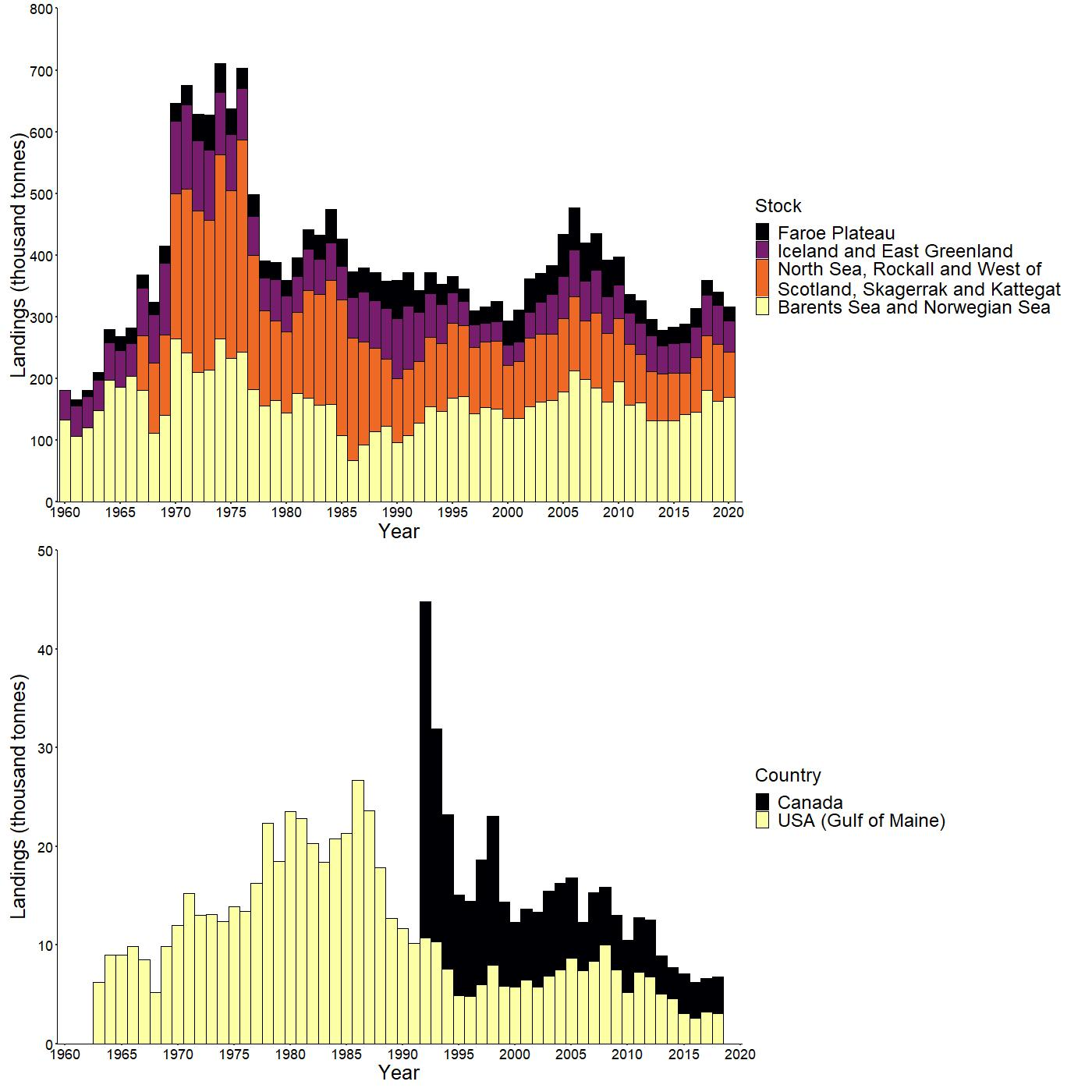
Commercial landings in the eastern (top) and western Atlantic (bottom). Data from ICES, NOAA and Fisheries and Oceans Canada

Saithe is fished year-round using gear such as Danish seine nets, trawlers, long lines and gill nets and is often caught in mixed species fishery with other groundfish species such as cod and whiting. The main fishing grounds in the eastern Atlantic are in the Barents Sea, around Iceland, around the Faeroe Islands and in the North Sea and Celtic Sea. Landings in the eastern Atlantic have fluctuated around 300,000–700,000 tonnes (330,000–770,000 short tons) in the period 1980–2017. All the stocks in eastern Atlantic are assessed by International Council for the Exploration of the Sea (ICES) which publish recommendations on an annual basis for Total Allowable Catch.

The commercial catch of saithe in the western Atlantic is taken by USA and Canada and has fluctuated around 5,000–45,000 tonnes (5,500–49,600 short tons) per year between 1980 and 2018. The population in the western Atlantic is assessed by USA National Oceanic and Atmospheric Administration (NOAA) and Fisheries and Oceans Canada.

All four stocks assessed in the eastern Atlantic and the stock in the western Atlantic are harvested sustainably with many saithe fisheries having been certified as sustainable by the Marine Stewardship Council.
