= Knaplundsøya =

Island in Nordland, Norway

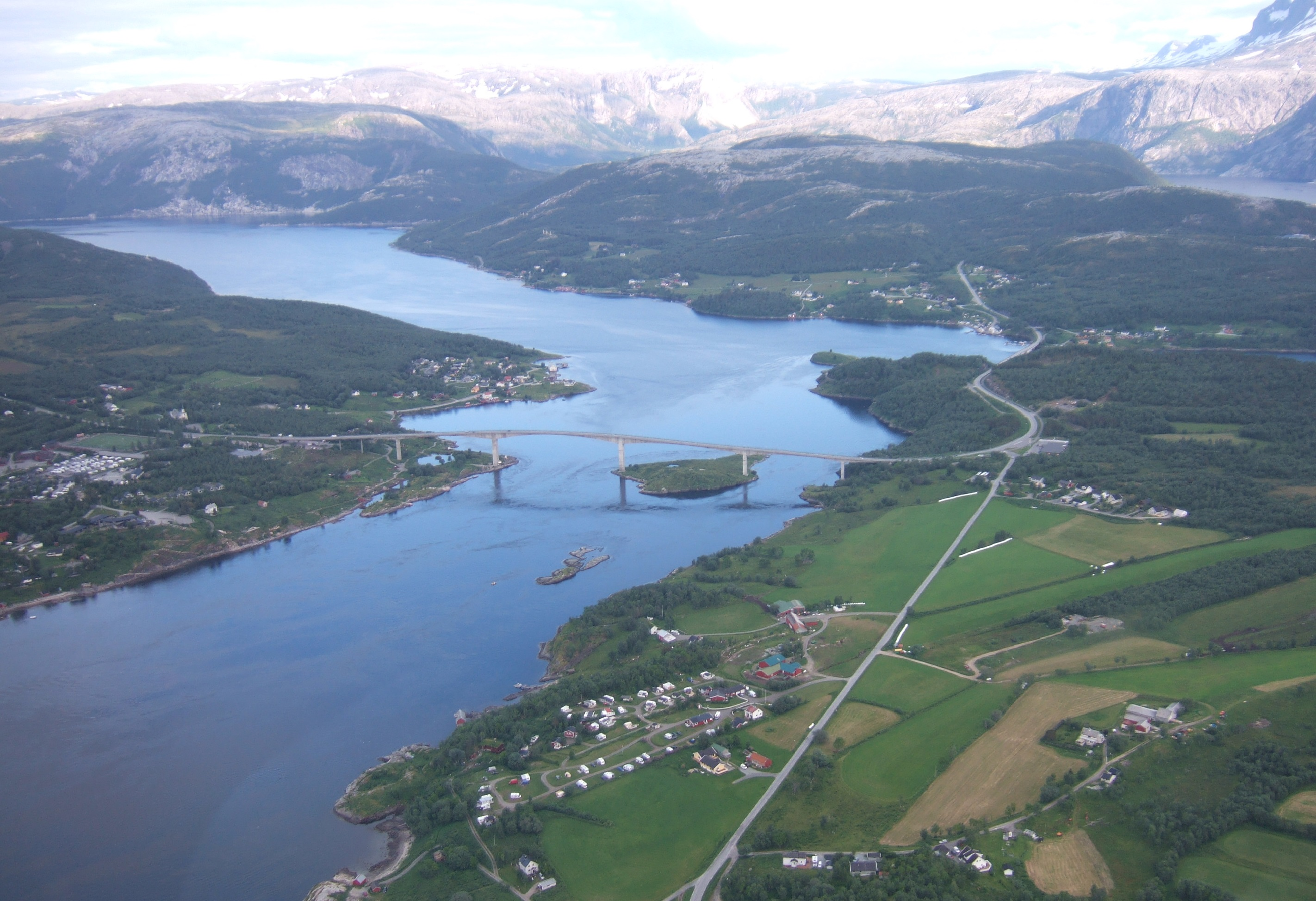
- View of the island on the left
- Interactive map of Knaplundsøya

Geography
- Location: Nordland, Norway
- Coordinates: 67.2319°N 14.6742°E
- Area: 6.6 km^{2} (2.5 sq mi)
- Length: 4.7 km (2.92 mi)
- Width: 1.9 km (1.18 mi)
- Highest elevation: 178 m (584 ft)
- Highest point: Storbranden

Administration
- Norway
- County: Nordland
- Municipality: Bodø Municipality

Knaplundsøya is an island in Bodø Municipality in Nordland county, Norway. The 6.6-square-kilometre (2.5 sq mi) island lies just southeast of the town of Bodø, between the Saltfjorden and the Skjerstadfjorden. The island is connected to the mainland and to the neighboring island of Straumøya by the Norwegian County Road 17. The Saltstraumen strait and its famous maelstrom are located between Straumøya and Knaplundsøya. The island had 392 residents in 2016, mostly living on the western village of Knaplund and the northeastern village of Godøya.

== See also ==
- List of islands of Norway
