= Sandhornøy Bridge =

Bridge in Gildeskål, Norway

Sandhornøy Bridge Sandhornøy bru
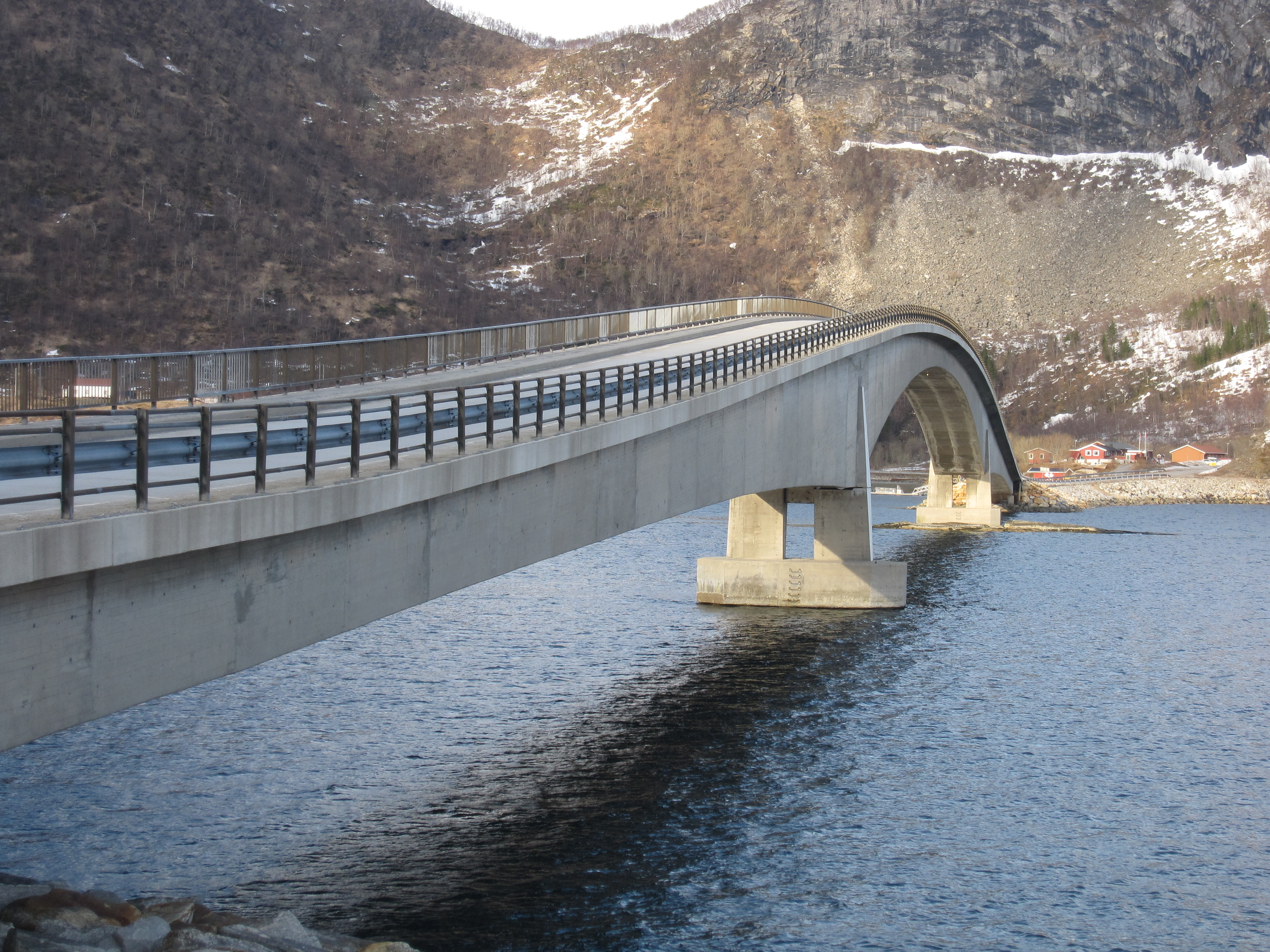
- View of the bridge
- Coordinates: 67°03′46″N 14°14′56″E
- Carries: Fv17
- Crosses: Tverrsundet
- Locale: Gildeskål Municipality, Norway

Characteristics
- Design: Cantilever bridge
- Material: Concrete
- Total length: 374 metres (1,227 ft)
- Longest span: 154 metres (505 ft)
- No. of spans: 3

History
- Opened: 1989

The Sandhornøy Bridge (Norwegian: Sandhornøy bru) is a cantilever bridge that crosses the Tverrsundet strait between the mainland and the island of Sandhornøya in Gildeskål Municipality in Nordland county, Norway. The bridge is 374 metres (1,227 ft) long and the longest of the 3 spans is 154 metres (505 ft). The Sandhornøy Bridge was opened in 1989 as an arm off of Norwegian County Road 17. The bridge is a single-cell prestressed concrete box girder bridge that was built using the balanced cantilever method.
