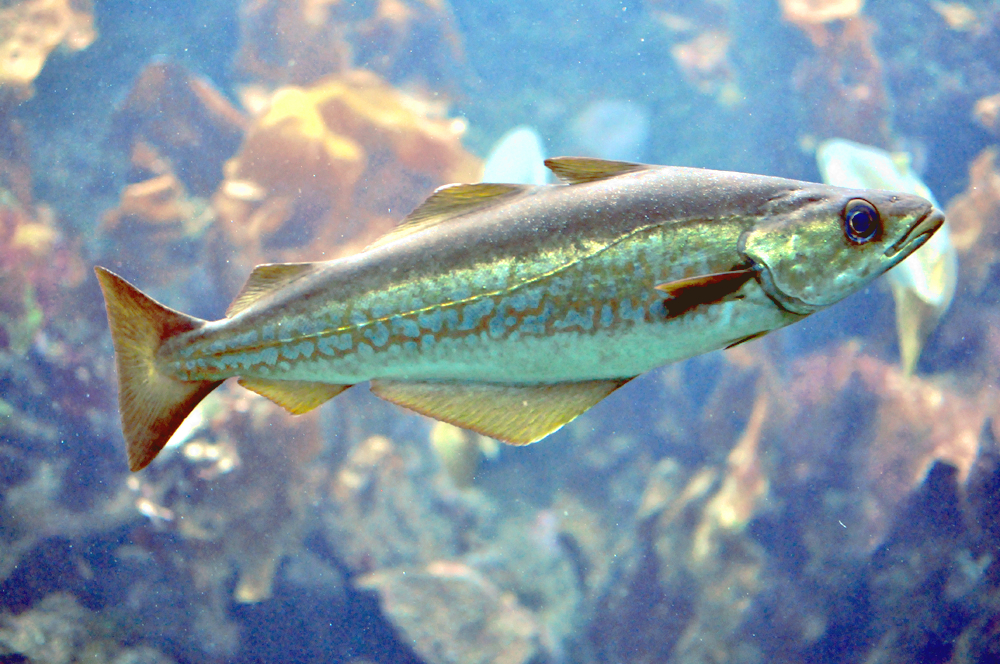
- Pollachius pollachius
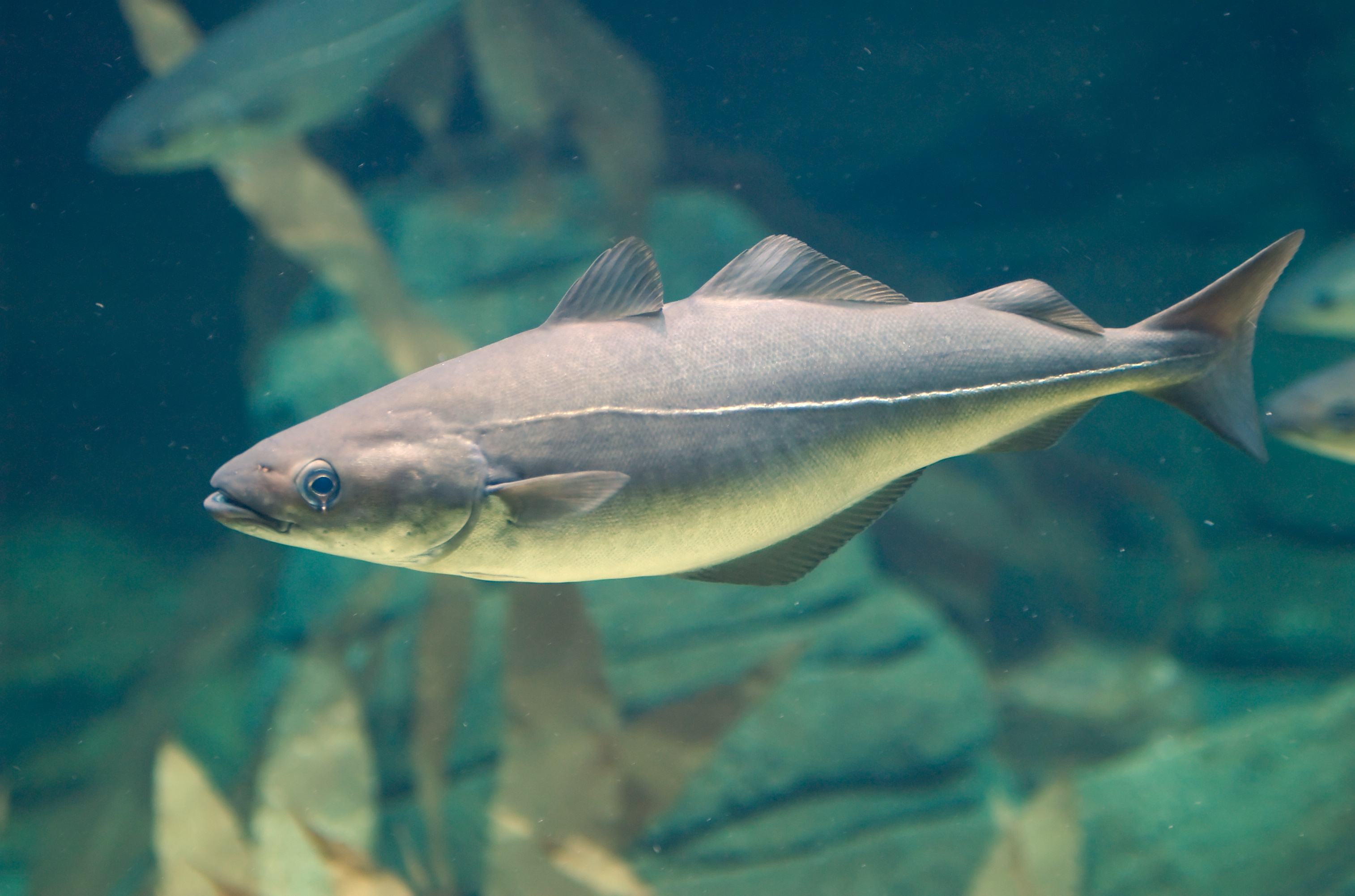
- Pollachius virens

Scientific classification
- Kingdom: Animalia
- Phylum: Chordata
- Class: Actinopterygii
- Division: Teleostei
- Order: Gadiformes
- Family: Gadidae
- Genus: Pollachius; Nilsson, 1832

Type species
- Pollachius pollachius Nilsson, 1832 (Linnaeus, 1758)

Synonyms
- Asellus Minding, 1832

= Pollock =

North Atlantic marine fish in the genus Pollachius

Pollock or pollack (pronounced /ˈpɒlək/) is the common name used for either of the two species of North Atlantic marine fish in the genus Pollachius. Pollachius pollachius is referred to as "pollock" in North America, Ireland and the United Kingdom, while Pollachius virens is usually known as saithe or coley in Great Britain and Ireland (derived from the older name coalfish). Other names for P. pollachius include the Atlantic pollock, European pollock, lieu jaune, and lythe or lithe; while P. virens is also known as Boston blue (distinct from bluefish) and silver bill.

== Species ==
The recognized species in this genus are:

Species	Common name	Image
Pollachius pollachius (Linnaeus, 1758)	pollack	
Pollachius virens (Linnaeus, 1758)	coalfish	

== Description ==
Both species can grow to 130 centimetres (4 feet 3 inches). P. virens can weigh up to 32 kilograms (71 pounds) and P. pollachius can weigh up to 18 kilograms (40 pounds). P. virens has a strongly defined, silvery lateral line running down the sides. Above the lateral line, the colour is a greenish black. The belly is white, while P. pollachius has a distinctly crooked lateral line, grayish to golden belly, and a dark brown back. P. pollachius also has a strong underbite. It can be found in water up to 180 metres (600 feet; 100 fathoms) deep over rocks and anywhere in the water column.

== As food ==
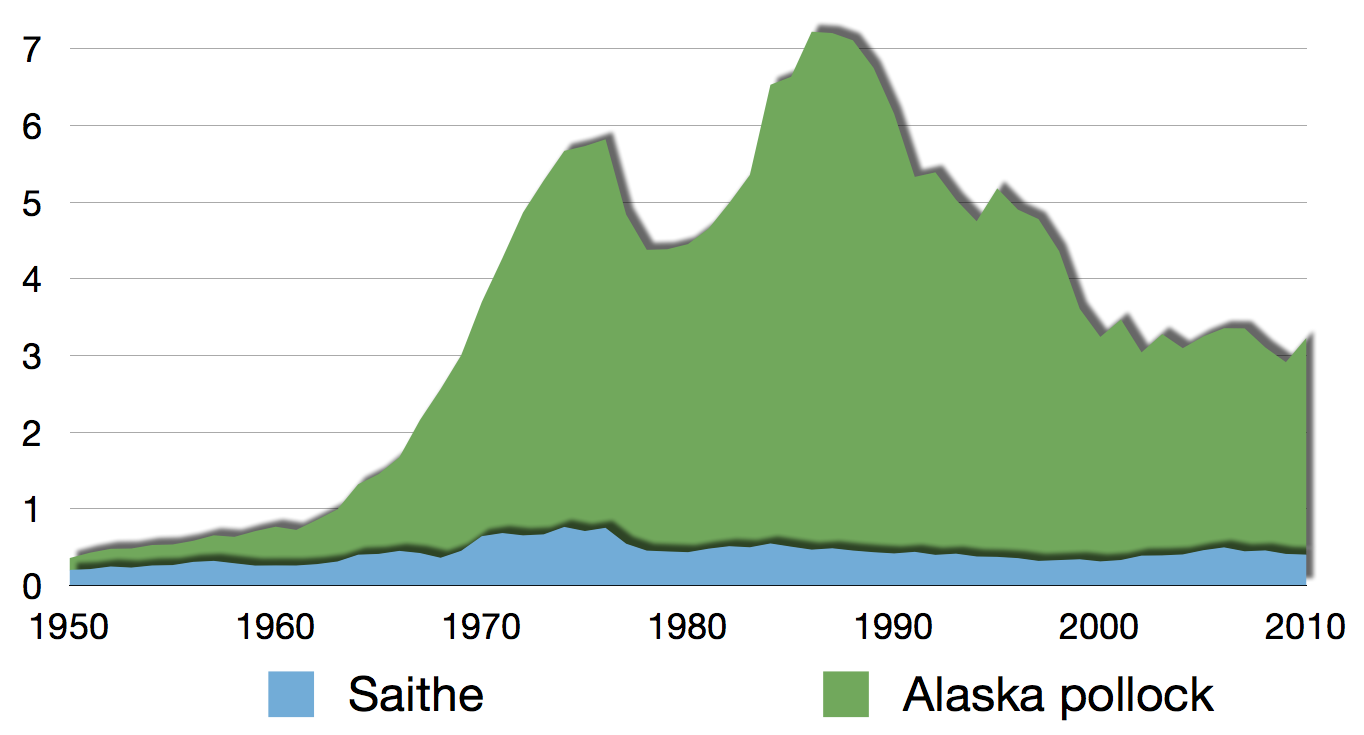
Global commercial capture of pollock in million tonnes 1950–2010

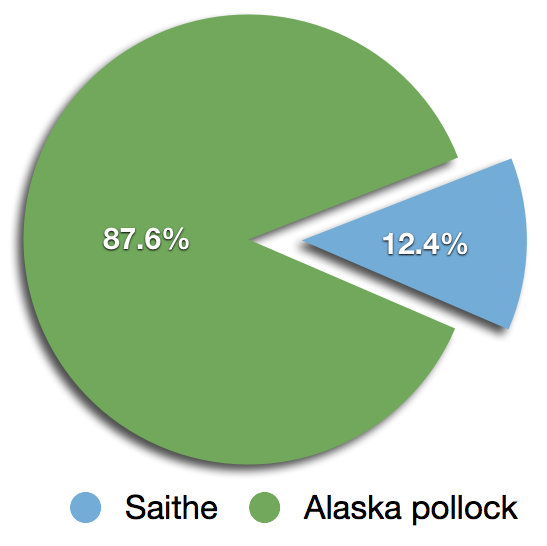
The total capture of pollock in 2010 as reported by the FAO was 3.2 million tonnes (3.5 million short tons).

Atlantic pollock is largely considered to be a whitefish. Traditionally a popular source of food in some countries, such as Norway, in the United Kingdom it has previously been largely consumed as a cheaper and versatile alternative to cod and haddock. However, in recent years, pollock has become more popular due to overfishing of cod and haddock. It can be found in most supermarkets as fresh fillets or prepared freezer items. For example, it is used minced in fish fingers or as an ingredient in imitation crab meat and is commonly used to make fish and chips.

Because of its slightly grey colour, pollock is often prepared, as in Norway, as fried fish balls, or if juvenile-sized, breaded with oatmeal and fried, as in Shetland. Year-old fish are traditionally split, salted, and dried over a peat hearth in Orkney, where their texture becomes wooden. Coalfish can also be salted and smoked and achieve a salmon-like orange color (although it is not closely related to the salmon), as is the case in Germany, where the fish is commonly sold as Seelachs ("sea salmon").

In 2009, UK supermarket Sainsbury's briefly renamed Atlantic pollock "colin" in a bid to boost ecofriendly sales of the fish as an alternative to cod. Sainsbury's, which said the new name was derived from the French for cooked pollock (colin), launched the product under the banner "Colin and chips can save British cod."

Pollock is regarded as a "low-mercury fish" – a woman weighing 60 kg (130 lb) can safely eat up to 510 g (18 oz) per week, and a child weighing 20 kg (44 lb) can safely eat up to 170 g (6 oz).

== Other fish called pollock ==
One member of the genus Gadus is also commonly referred to as pollock: the Alaska pollock or walleye pollock (Gadus chalcogrammus), including the form known as the Norway pollock. They are also members of the family Gadidae but not members of the genus Pollachius.
