= Sør-Arnøy =

Village in Gildeskål Municipality, Norway

Sør-Arnøy Sørarnøya / Sørarnøy
- Village
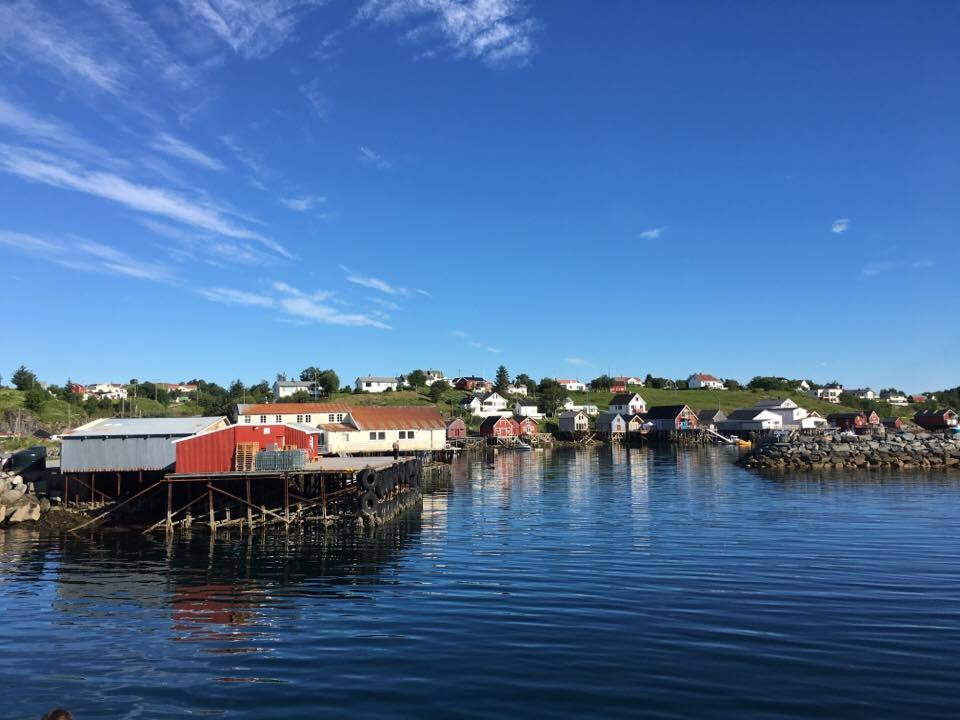
- View of the village
- Interactive map of Sør-Arnøy
- Location within Nordland Location within Norway
- Coordinates: 67.1363°N 13.9669°E
- Country: Norway
- Region: Northern Norway
- County: Nordland
- District: Salten
- Municipality: Gildeskål Municipality

Area
  - Total: 0.66 km^{2} (0.25 sq mi)
- Elevation: 16 m (52 ft)

Population (2007)
  - Total: 205
  - Density: 311/km^{2} (810/sq mi)
- Time zone: UTC+01:00 (CET)
  - Summer (DST): UTC+02:00 (CEST)
- Post Code: 8135 Sørarnøy

Sør-Arnøy is a small fishing village in Gildeskål Municipality in Nordland county, Norway. The village covers the majority of the island of Sør-Arnøya. The closest town to Sør-Arnøy is Bodø, which is located about 25 kilometres (16 mi) to the northeast on the mainland.

The 0.66-square-kilometre (160-acre) village had a population (2007) of 205 and a population density of 311 inhabitants per square kilometre (810/sq mi). Since 2007, the population and area data for this village area has not been separately tracked by Statistics Norway.
