= Nord-Arnøya =

Island in Nordland, Norway

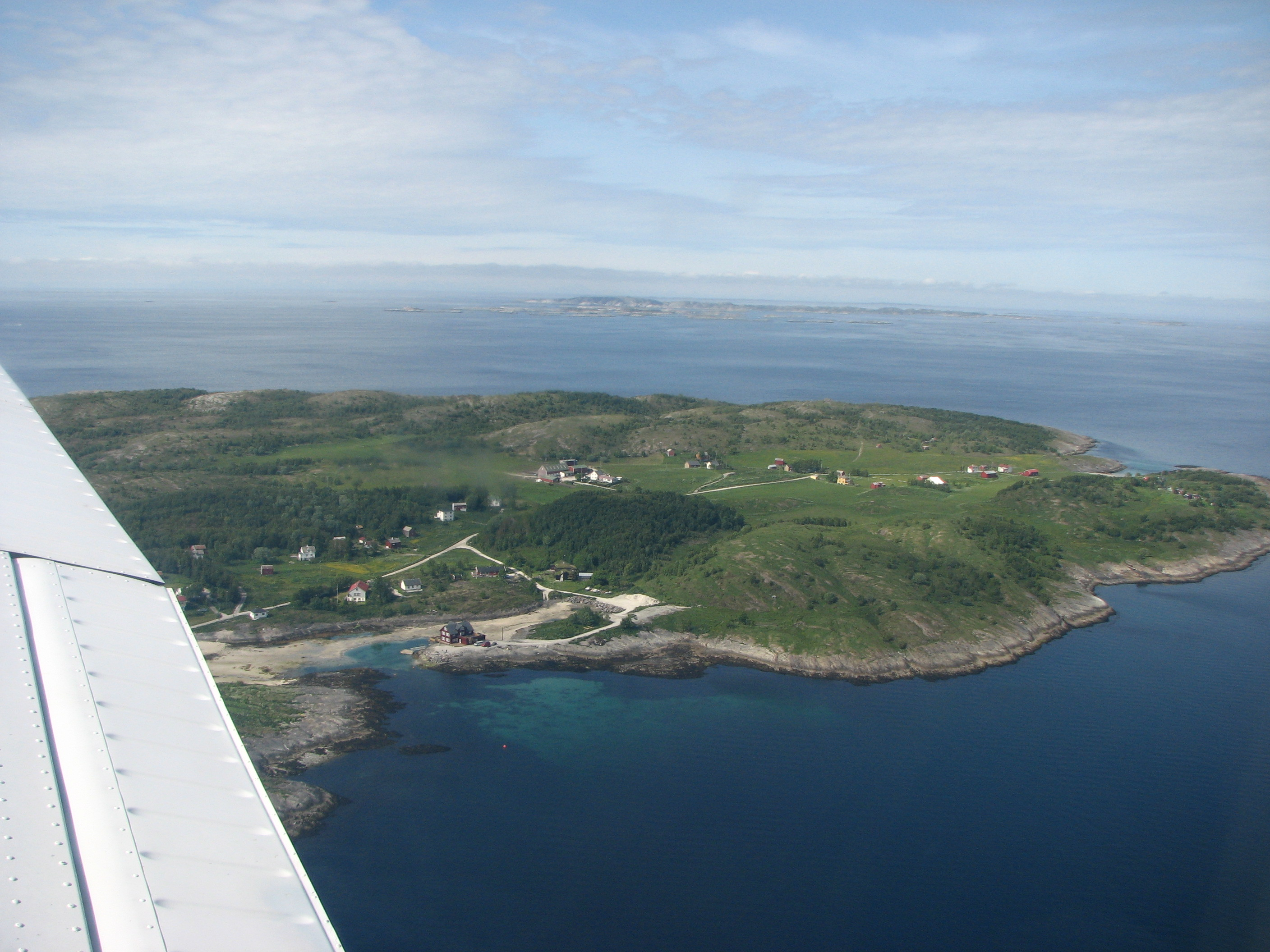
- Interactive map of Nord-Arnøya

Geography
- Location: Nordland, Norway
- Coordinates: 67.1612°N 13.9940°E
- Area: 2.8 km^{2} (1.1 sq mi)

Administration
- Norway
- County: Nordland
- Municipality: Gildeskål Municipality

Demographics
- Population: 52 (2017)

Nord-Arnøya is an island in Gildeskål Municipality in Nordland county, Norway. The 2.8-square-kilometre (1.1 sq mi) island had 52 residents in 2017. It lies directly north of the island of Sør-Arnøya. There is a 100-metre (330 ft) long bridge connecting the two islands. There is a small fishing village on the west side of the island (also called Nord-Arnøya).

== See also ==
- List of islands of Norway
