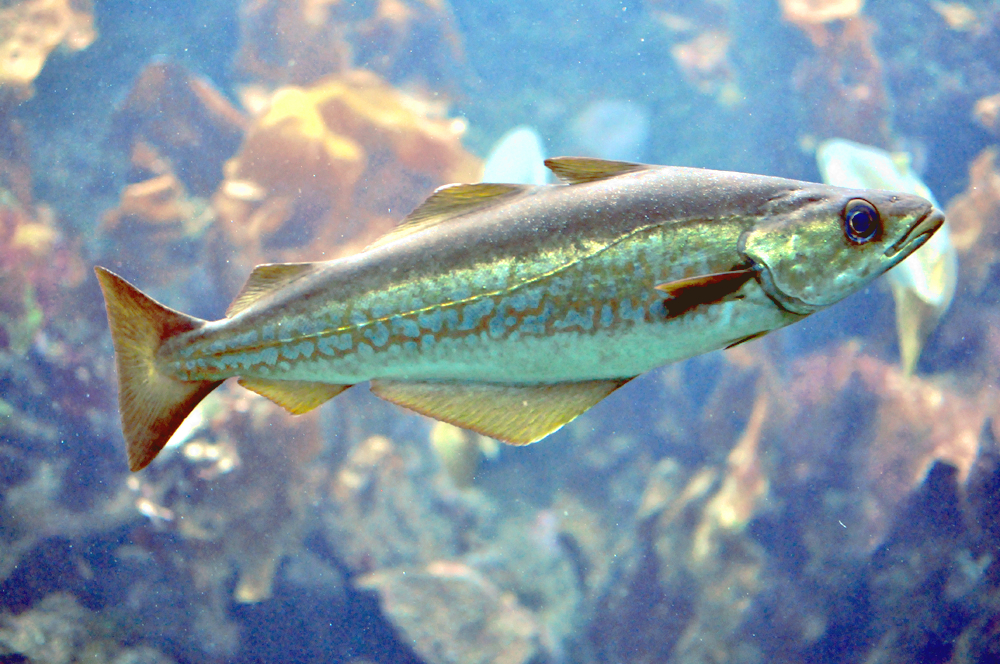

Conservation status
- Least Concern (IUCN 3.1)

Scientific classification
- Kingdom: Animalia
- Phylum: Chordata
- Class: Actinopterygii
- Division: Teleostei
- Order: Gadiformes
- Family: Gadidae
- Genus: Pollachius
- Species: P. pollachius

Binomial name
- Pollachius pollachius (Linnaeus, 1758)

Synonyms
- Gadus pollachius Linnaeus, 1758: Merlangus pollachius (Linnaeus, 1758); Gadus lycostomus Faber, 1828; Pollachius typus Bonaparte, 1846; Gadus viridis Gronow, 1854; Pollachius linnei Malm, 1877

= Pollachius pollachius =

Atlantic pollock

Species of fish

Pollachius pollachius is a species of marine fish in the family Gadidae. FAO uses the English name pollack for this species, whereas in American English it is known as Atlantic or European pollock. Other vernacular names include lythe, and in the Isle of Man, callig.

It is common in the north-eastern parts of the Northern Atlantic, including the Bay of Biscay and North Sea. Adults can grow up to 130 cm (51 in) and weigh up to 12.5 kg (28 lb), although more commonly their maximum length is 75 cm (30 in).

== Ecology and life history ==
Pollack are fast-growing and relatively short-lived. The maximum reported age is 15 years. They are said to spawn offshore, although their spawning grounds are poorly known; a study of a fjord population in Norway suggested local spawning.

Pollack are benthopelagic, that is, they live near the sea floor. They seem to be relatively sedentary.

== Fisheries ==
Pollack is of value to fisheries, although it mainly represents bycatch. Landings data show three fairly distinct centres of distribution, one in the northern North Sea/Skagerrak extending north along the Norwegian coast, one between the English Channel, the Irish Sea, and the northern part of the French west coast, and one in the Iberian waters. Total reported landings are of the order of a few thousand tonnes.

Pollack is an important species in recreational fisheries. In Norway, tourist fishers alone were estimated to catch 100 tonnes of pollack in 2009. In France, 3,500 tonnes of pollack were estimated to be caught in all recreational fisheries.
