= Saltfjorden =

Fjord in Nordland, Norway

Saltfjorden (Norwegian); Sáltovuodna (Lule Sami)
- Saltenfjorden (Norwegian)
- Interactive map of the fjord
- Location: Nordland county, Norway
- Coordinates: 67.255°N 14.517°E
- Type: Fjord
- Primary inflows: Skjerstad Fjord
- Primary outflows: Vestfjorden
- Basin countries: Norway
- Max. length: 40 kilometres (25 mi)

Saltfjorden (Norwegian) or Sáltovuodna (Lule Sami) is a fjord in Bodø Municipality and Gildeskål Municipality in Nordland county, Norway. The 40-kilometre (25 mi) long fjord begins around the Fleinvær islands; travels northeast past the islands of Sørarnøya, Sandhornøya, and Straumøya islands; along the southern shores of the town of Bodø; and ends at the village of Løding.

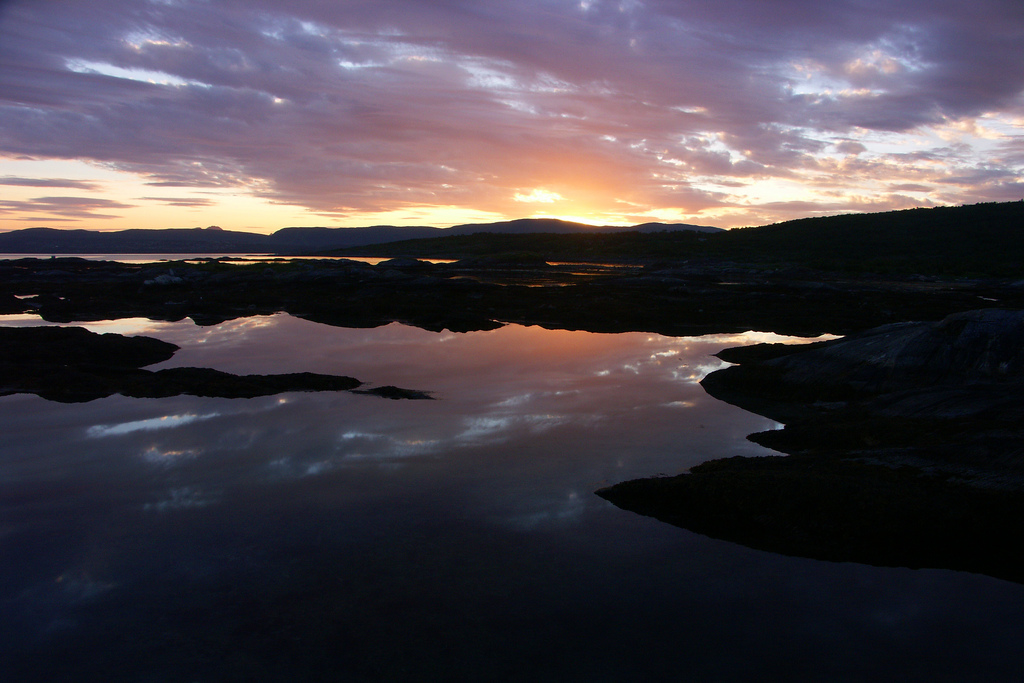
View of the Saltfjorden

The narrow Saltstraumen strait connects the Saltfjorden to the large, inland Skjerstad Fjord. The strait has a very strong tidal current and maelstrom, making travel difficult and dangerous.

== See also ==
- List of Norwegian fjords
