= Saltstraumen =

Norwegian sea strait with one of the strongest tidal currents in the world

Saltstraumen (Norwegian); Stuorstrávve (Lule Sami)
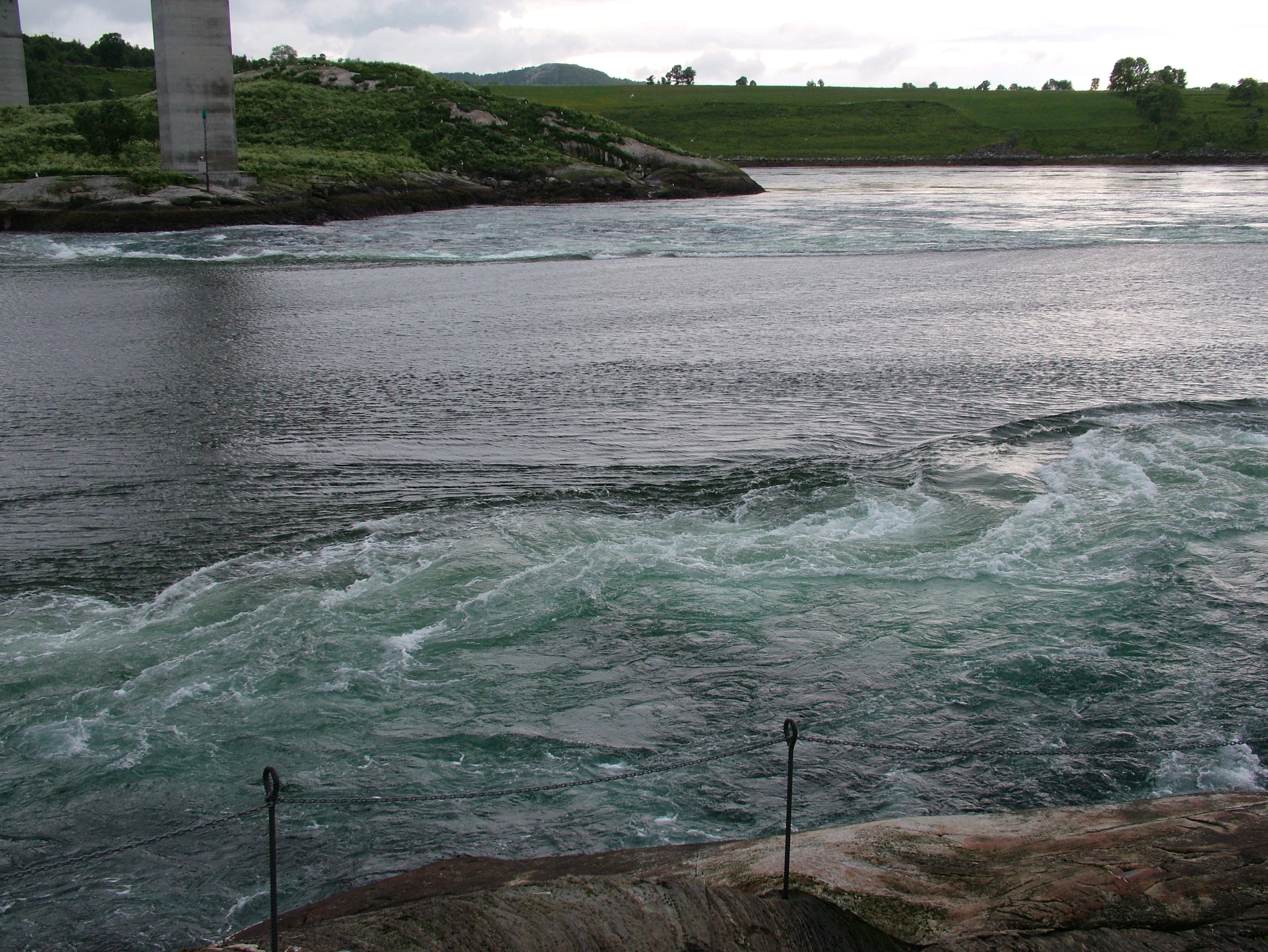
- View of the maelstrom
- Interactive map of the fjord
- Location: Nordland county, Norway
- Coordinates: 67.22805°N 14.61635°E
- Type: Maelstrom
- Basin countries: Norway

Saltstraumen (Norwegian) or Stuorstrávve (Lule Sami) is a small strait with one of the strongest tidal currents in the world. It is located in Bodø Municipality in Nordland county, Norway. It is located about 10 km (6.2 mi) southeast of the town of Bodø. The narrow channel connects the outer Saltfjorden to the large Skjerstad Fjord between the islands of Straumøya and Knaplundsøya. The Saltstraumen Bridge on Norwegian County Road 17 crosses Saltstraumen.

== Current ==
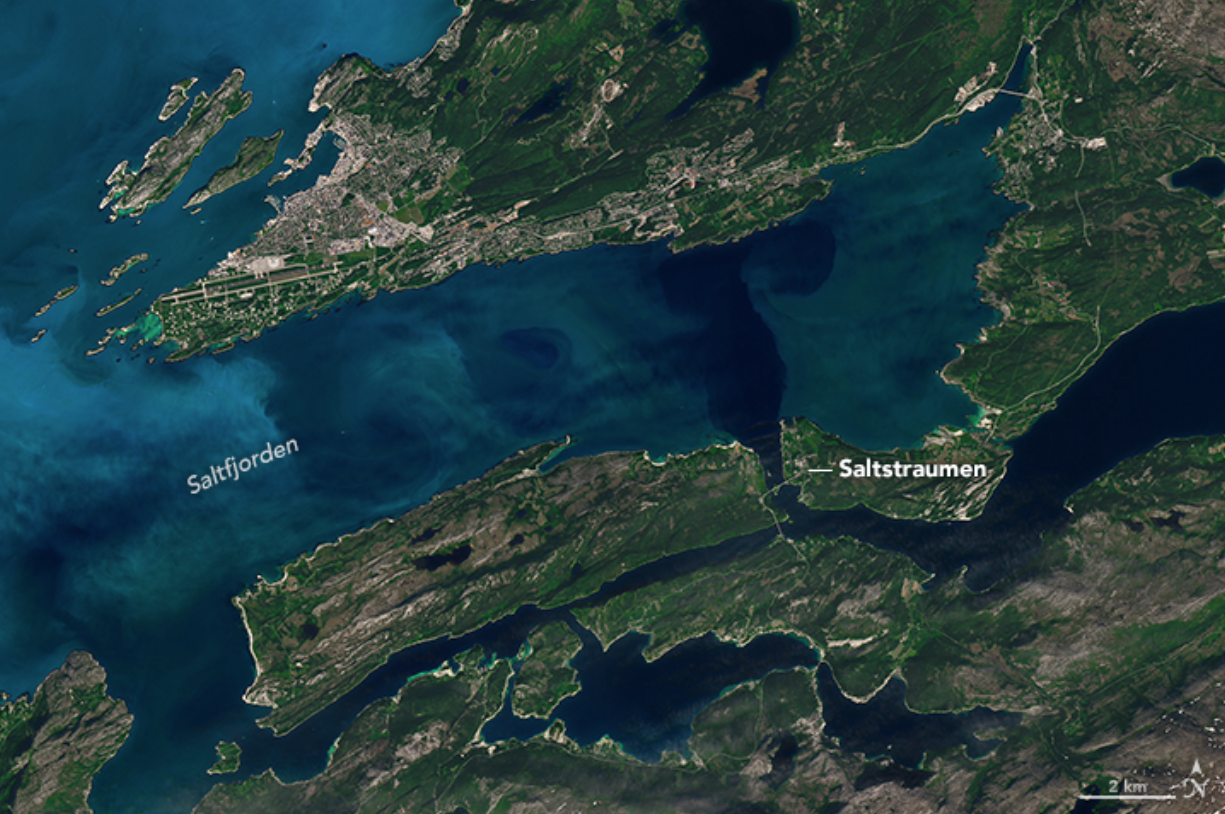
Saltstraumen current churning up phytoplankton blooms in a NASA satellite image

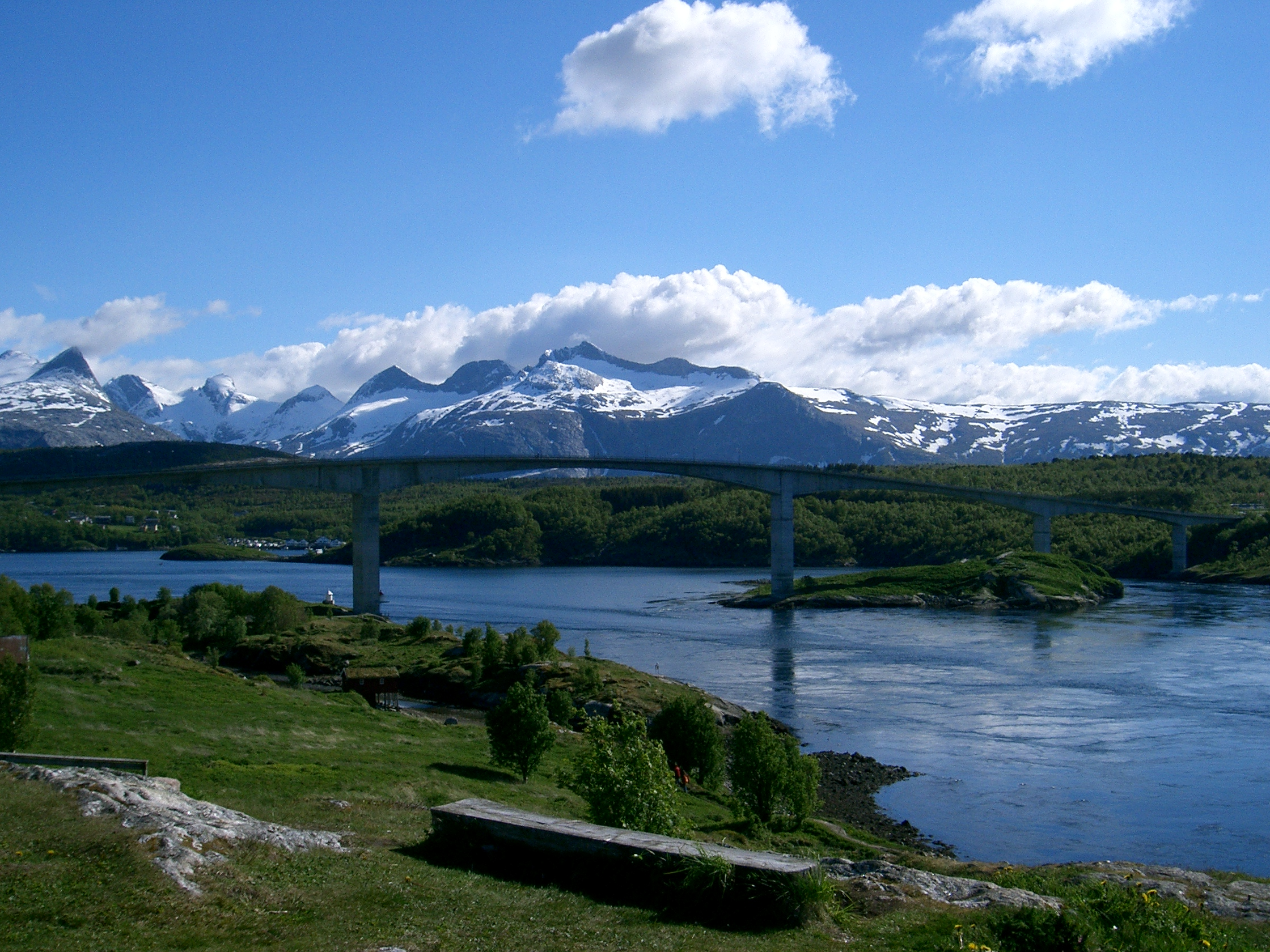
Saltstraumen and the Saltstraumen Bridge with the Børvasstindene mountains in the background

Saltstraumen has one of the strongest tidal currents in the world. Up to 400 million cubic metres (110 billion US gallons) of seawater forces its way through a 3 km (1.9 mi) long and 150 m (490 ft) wide strait every six hours. Vortices known as whirlpools or maelstroms up to 10 m (33 ft) in diameter and 5 m (16 ft) in depth are formed when the current is at its strongest. At this point, one source claims that the tidal current can reach 40 km/h (25 mph).

Saltstraumen has existed for about two to three thousand years. Before that, the area was different due to post-glacial rebound. The current is created when the tide tries to fill Skjerstad Fjord. The height difference between the sea level and the fjord inside can be up to 1 m (3 ft 3 in). When the current turns, there is a period when the strait is navigable.

The above account of the Saltstraumen is rather different than what The Norwegian Pilot reports. The Pilot’s description of the normal current is based on the time of the high tide at Bodø. The greatest southbound current occurs about one and a quarter hours before Bodø high tide, when the inflowing current reaches about 7 knots (13 kilometres per hour). The speed of the current has a broad maximum being greater than 6 kn (11 km/h) from three hours before Bodø high tide until half an hour after Bodø high tide. The greatest northbound current occurs about four and a half hours after Bodø high tide, when the outflowing current reaches over 8 kn (15 km/h). The speed of this current also has a broad maximum being above six knots from two hours and forty minutes after Bodø high tide until five and a half hours before the next Bodø high tide. The behavior of the current may differ from normal due to strong winds or when more fresh water than usual is entering into the fjord from the surrounding mountains.

== Fishing ==
Saltstraumen is popular with anglers, due to its abundance of fish such as saithe, cod, wolffish, rose fish, and halibut. Coalfish is a specialty of the area. The largest documented coalfish of 22.7 kg (50 lb) was caught in Saltstraumen on a fishing rod.

Eiders are the only birds capable of diving for mussels in the strong stream.

== Name ==
The first element is the name of the district Salten and the last element is the definite form of straum, meaning "stream" or "water flow". In other sources the first element is derived from an old (obsolete) word salpt with the meaning "strong stream", and the district is named after the stream.

== History ==
The remains of a 10,000-year-old hunter settlement in the area are the oldest known traces of human settlement in Bodø, and also one of the oldest archaeological discoveries in Norway. These hunters lived on the edge of the ice, attracted by the abundance of fish caused by the strong currents.

== Media gallery ==
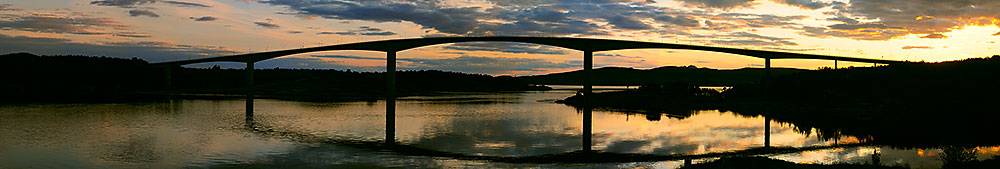
The Saltstraum bridge at midsummer night, July 2009
Saltstraumen churning, February 2011.

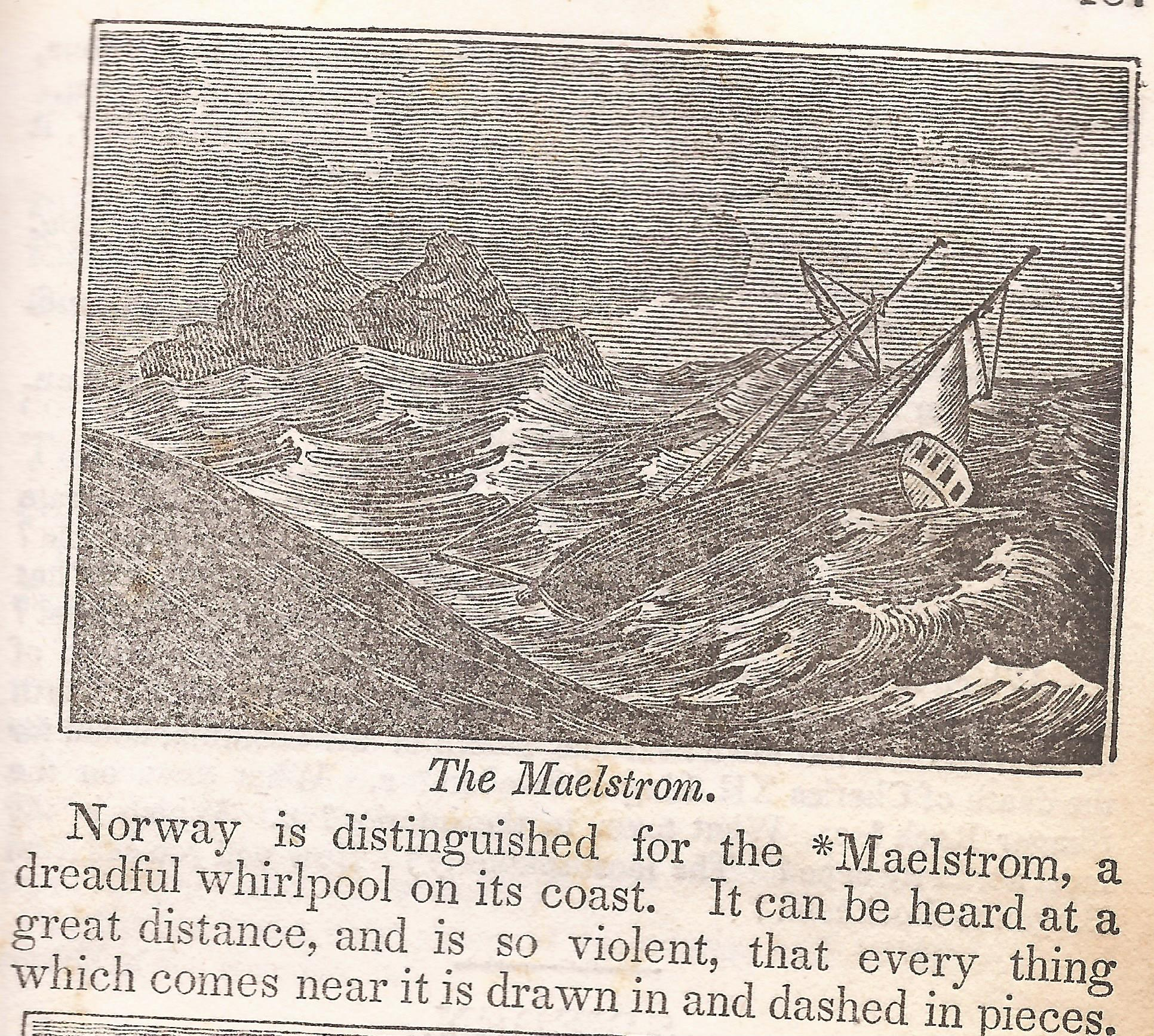
Saltstraumen 1837.

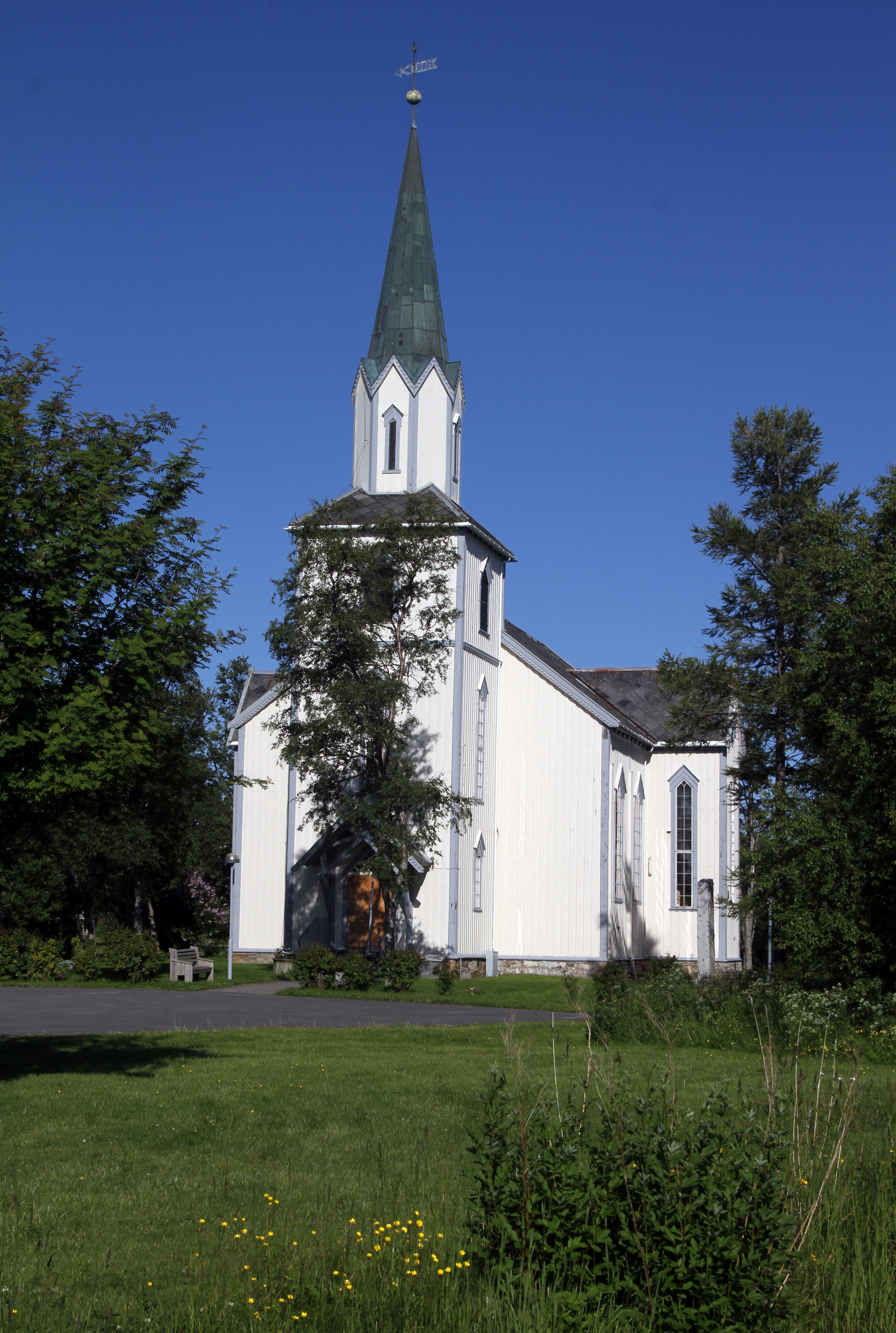
Saltstraumen church

== See also ==
- Maelstrom
- Tidal bore
- Moskstraumen
- Skookumchuck Narrows
- Horizontal Falls, where the tide creates a waterfall with a drop of 5 metres, as the water flows at the maximum rate.
