= Sør-Arnøya =

Island in Nordland, Norway

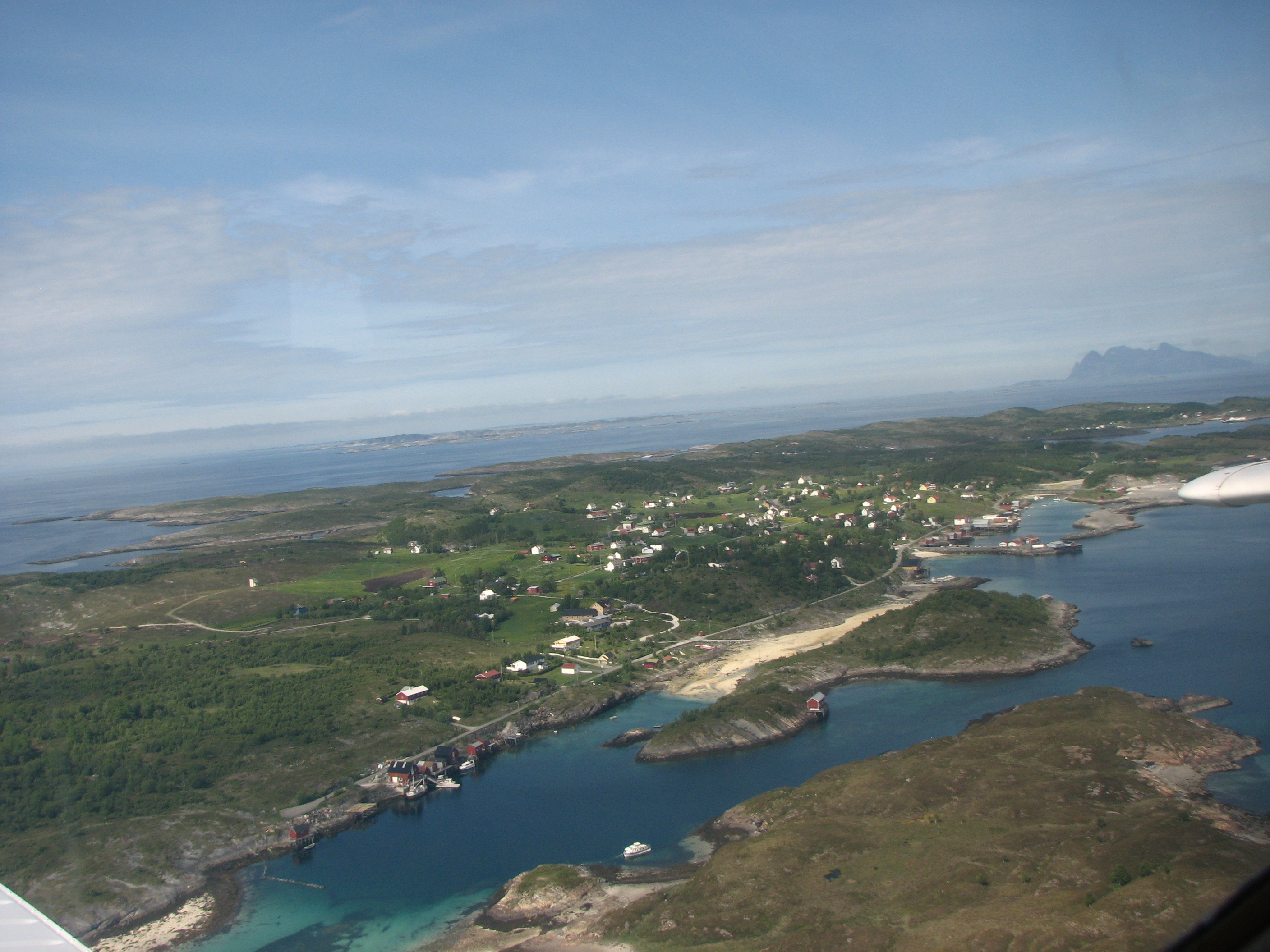
- Interactive map of Sør-Arnøya

Geography
- Location: Nordland, Norway
- Coordinates: 67.1363°N 13.9669°E
- Area: 4 km^{2} (1.5 sq mi)
- Length: 3.5 km (2.17 mi)
- Width: 1.5 km (0.93 mi)
- Highest elevation: 54 m (177 ft)
- Highest point: Storåsen

Administration
- Norway
- County: Nordland
- Municipality: Gildeskål Municipality

Demographics
- Population: 199 (2016)

Sør-Arnøya is a small island in Gildeskål Municipality in Nordland county, Norway. The 4-square-kilometre (1.5 sq mi) island is located west of the neighboring island of Sandhornøya and south of the island of Nord-Arnøya. Sør-Arnøya and Nord-Arnøya are linked with a 100-metre (330 ft) long bridge.

The population (2016) of the island is 199. The main village on the island is the village of Sør-Arnøy. The closest town to Sør-Arnøya is Bodø, to the north, which can be reached by boat.

== See also ==
- List of islands of Norway
