= Norwegian County Road 17 =

County road in Nordland and Trøndelag, Norway

Coordinates: 64°01′N 11°31′E

County Road 17
- Bokmål: Fylkesvei 17; Nynorsk: Fylkesveg 17
- Kystriksveien (Coastal Highway)
- Map of the road

Route information
- Maintained by Norwegian Public Roads Administration
- Length: 630 km (390 mi)

Major junctions
- North end: Rv80 Bodø, Nordland
- South end: E6 Steinkjer, Trøndelag

Location
- Country: Norway

Highway system
- Roads in Norway; National Roads; County Roads

County Road 17 (Norwegian: Fylkesvei 17), also known as the Coastal Highway (Norwegian: Kystriksveien), is a Norwegian highway that runs from the town of Bodø in Nordland county (in the north) to the town of Steinkjer in Trøndelag county (in the south). It is 630 kilometres (390 mi) long and includes six ferry crossings. The road runs along the coast of Nordland and Trøndelag counties through 28 different municipalities. This road is a much more scenic, albeit longer and more time-consuming, route than the inland European Route E6 highway.

Prior to 1 January 2010, this was National Road 17 (Norwegian: Riksvei 17), but control and maintenance of the road was transferred to the counties from the national government on that date, so now it is a county road.

== Media gallery ==
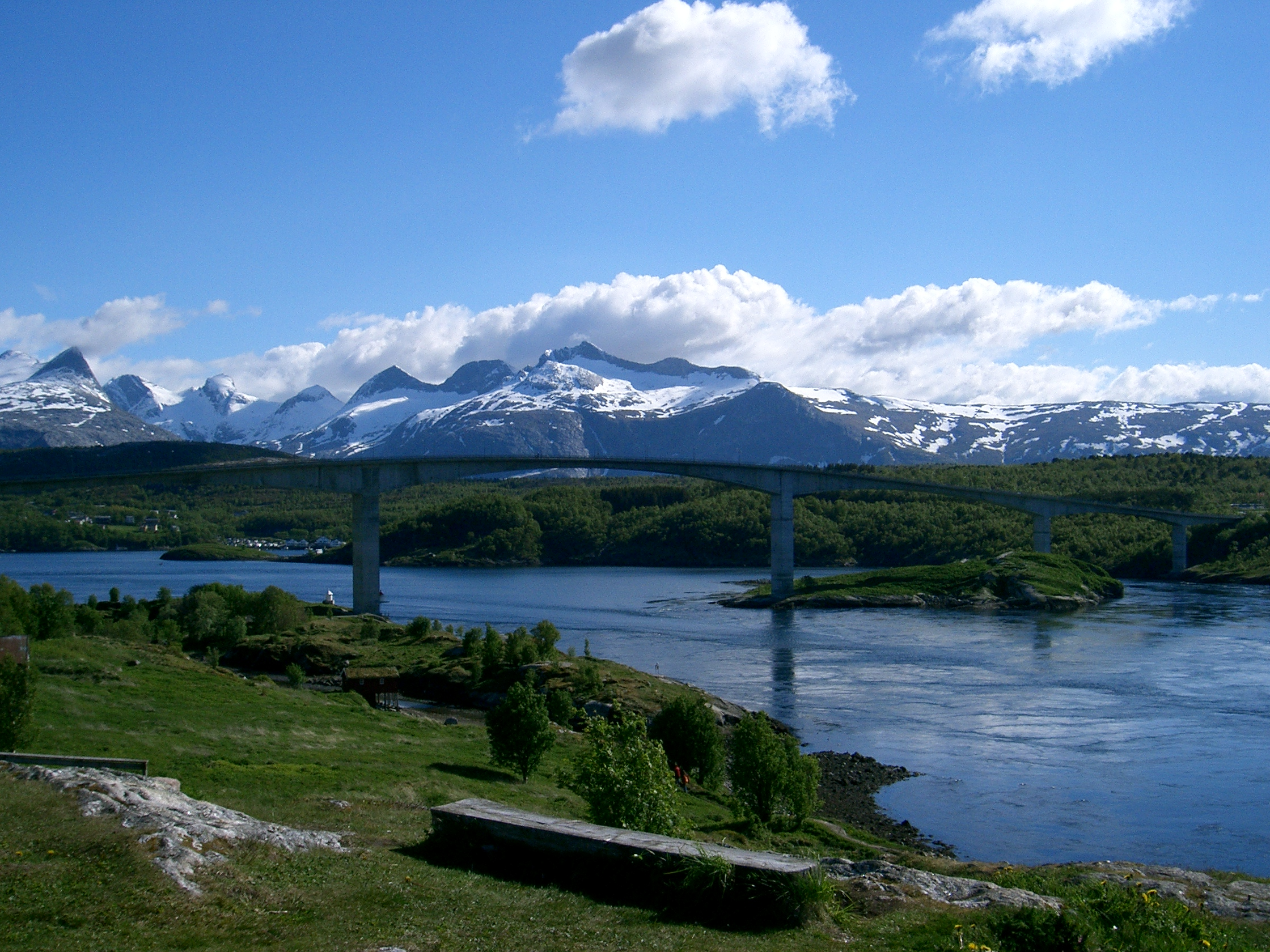
Fv17 crosses Saltstraumen

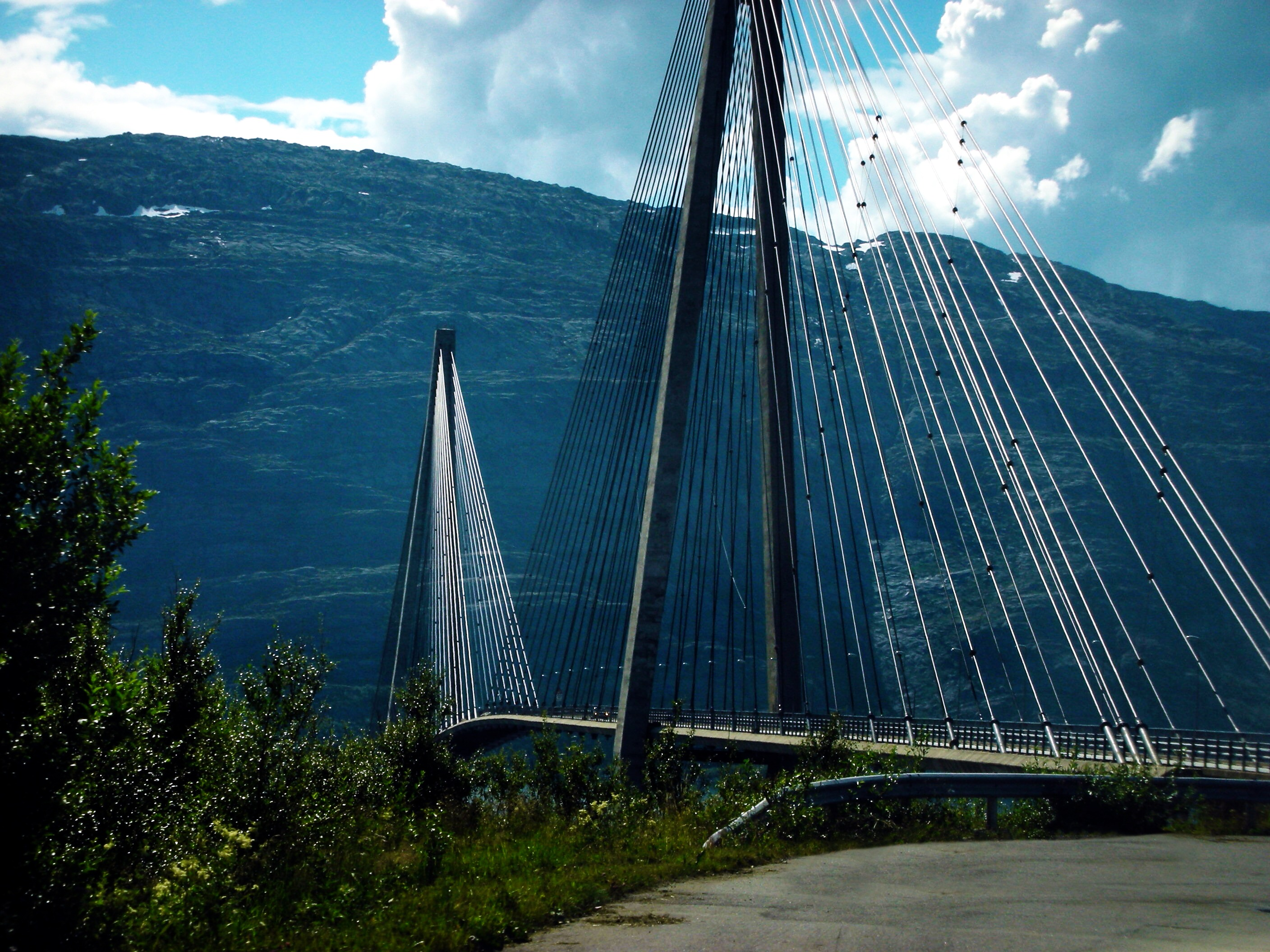
The Helgeland Bridge north of Sandnessjøen

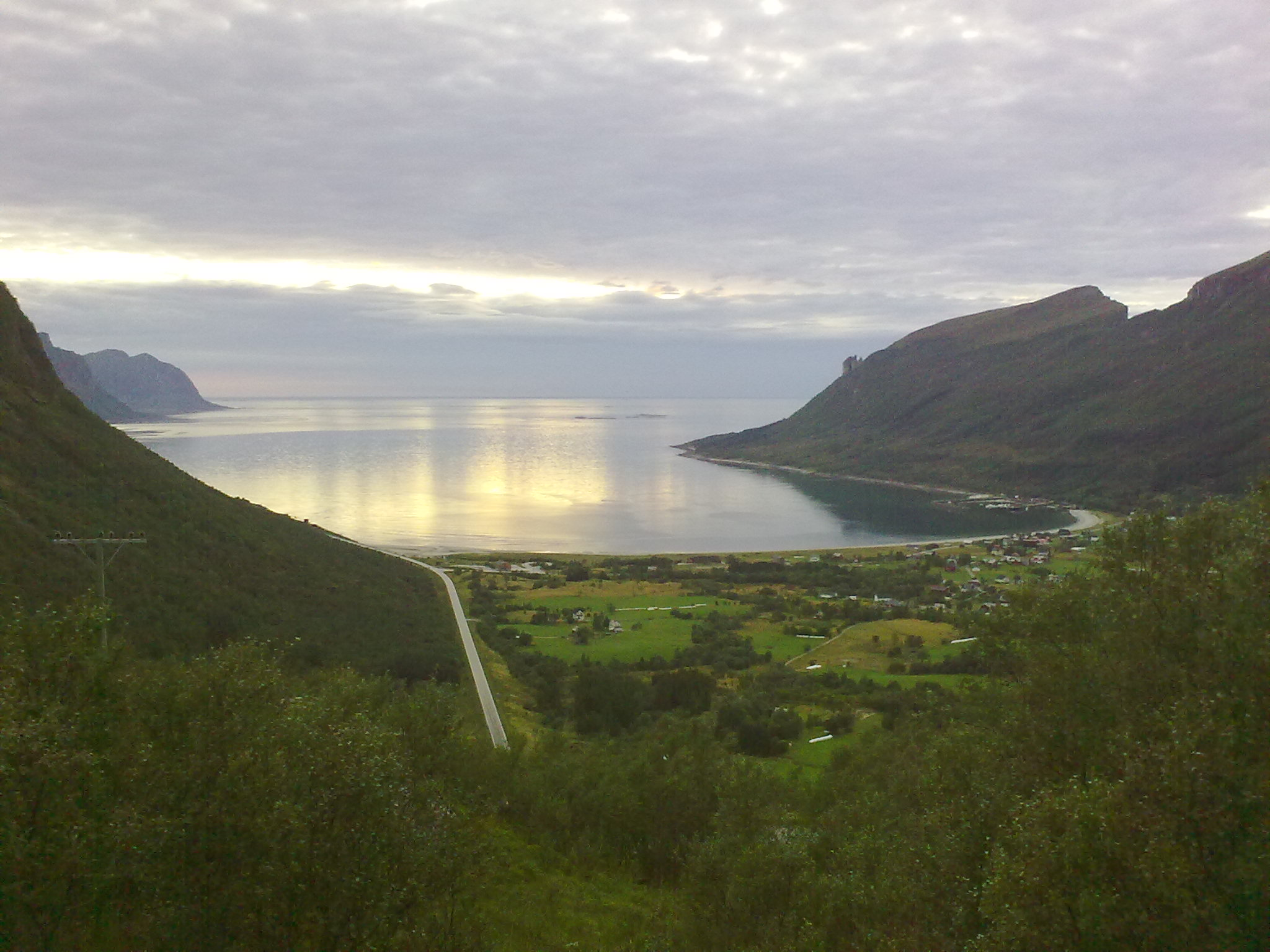
Storvik bay

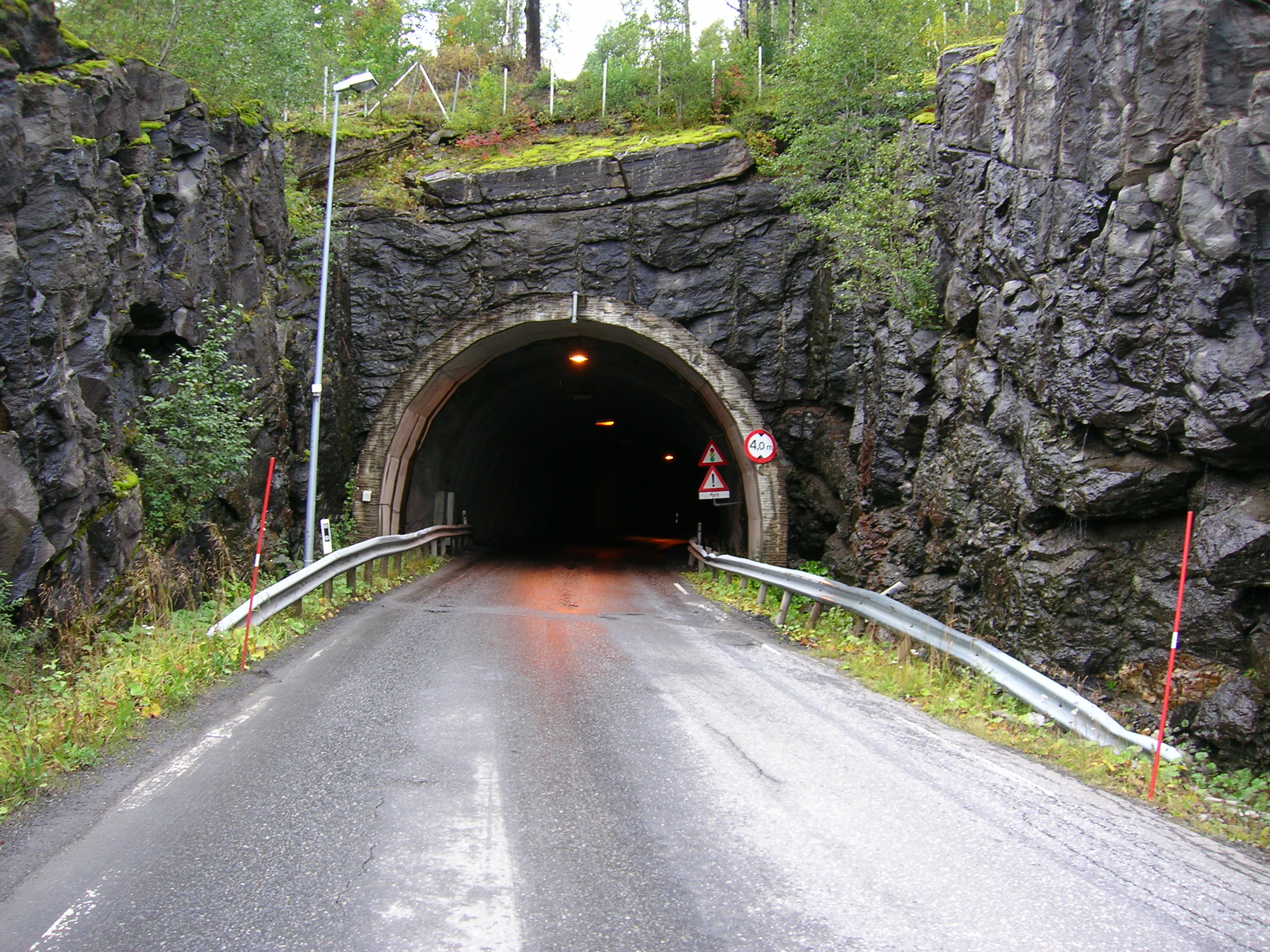
Sjona tunnel in Rana Municipality
