= Bodin Municipality =

Former municipality in Nordland, Norway

Bodin Municipality Bodin herred
- Former municipality
- Bodø landdistrikt (historic name)
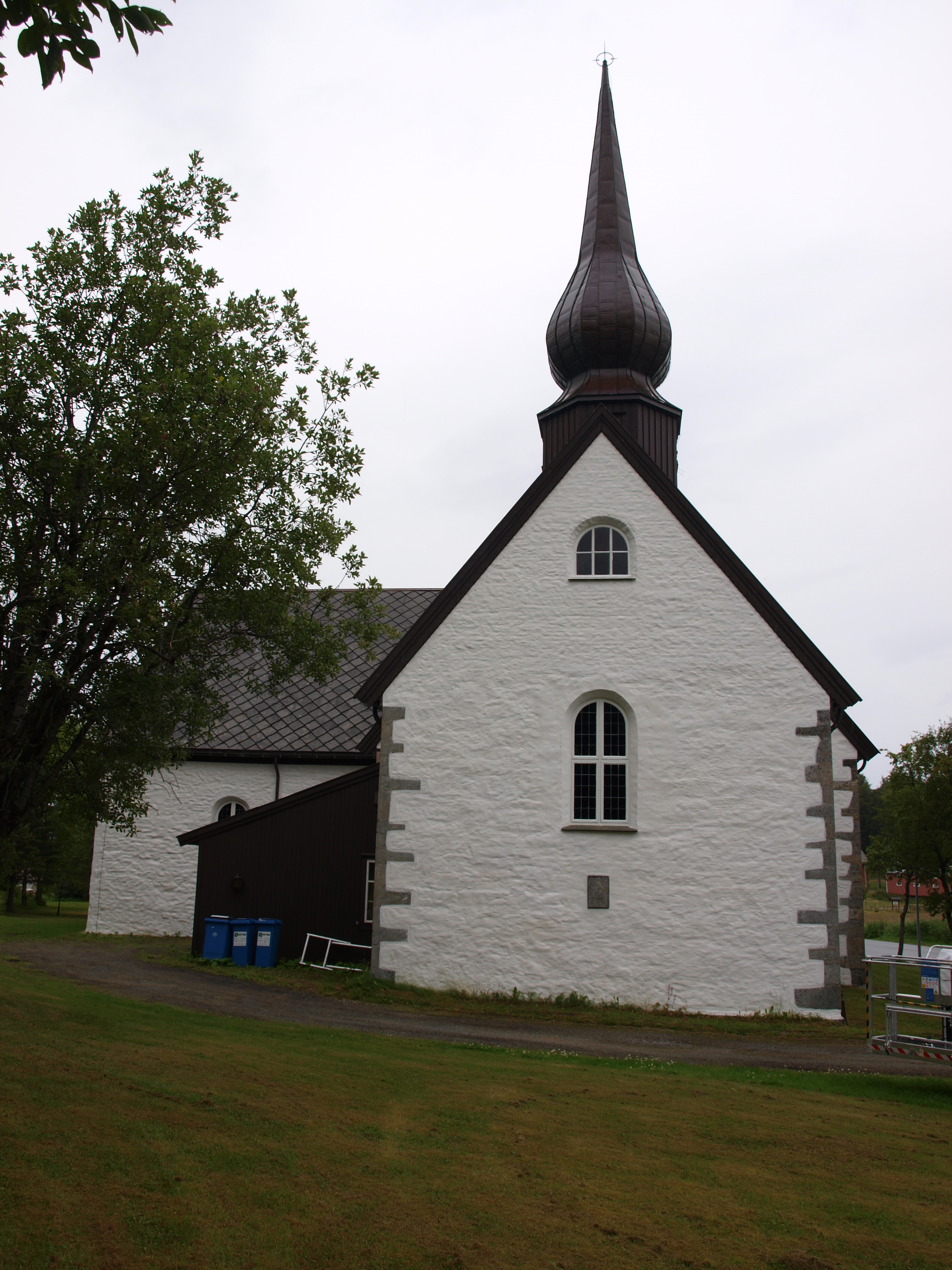

- Nordland within Norway

- Bodin within Nordland
- Coordinates: 67°16′26″N 14°26′05″E
- Country: Norway
- County: Nordland
- District: Salten
- Established: 1 Jan 1838
  - Created as: Formannskapsdistrikt
- Disestablished: 1 Jan 1968
  - Succeeded by: Bodø Municipality
- Administrative centre: Bodø

Government
  - Mayor (1964–1968): Henry Forsaa (Ap)

Area (upon dissolution)
  - Total: 910.2 km^{2} (351.4 sq mi)
  - Rank: #117 in Norway
- Highest elevation: 1,284.52 m (4,214.3 ft)

Population (1967)
  - Total: 12,807
  - Rank: #59 in Norway
  - Density: 14.1/km^{2} (37/sq mi)
  - Change (10 years): ▲ +27.4%

Official language
  - Norwegian form: Bokmål
- Time zone: UTC+01:00 (CET)
  - Summer (DST): UTC+02:00 (CEST)
- ISO 3166 code: NO-1843

Bodin is a former municipality in Nordland county, Norway. The 910-square-kilometre (350 sq mi) municipality existed from 1838 until its dissolution in 1968. The area is now part of Bodø Municipality in the traditional district of Salten. The administrative centre was located in the town of Bodø which actually was not part of Bodin Municipality. Notable villages in Bodin included Løding, Fenes, and Løpsmarka.

Since 1968, Bodin has continued to exist as a parish within the Church of Norway. Bodin parish represents the mainland area immediately surrounding the town of Bodø and the western islands. The main church for the parish is the historic Bodin Church.

Prior to its dissolution in 1968, the 910-square-kilometre (350 sq mi) municipality was the 117th largest by area out of the 454 municipalities in Norway. Bodin Municipality was the 59th most populous municipality in Norway with a population of about 12,807. The municipality's population density was 14.1 inhabitants per square kilometre (37/sq mi) and its population had increased by 27.4% over the previous 10-year period.

== General information ==
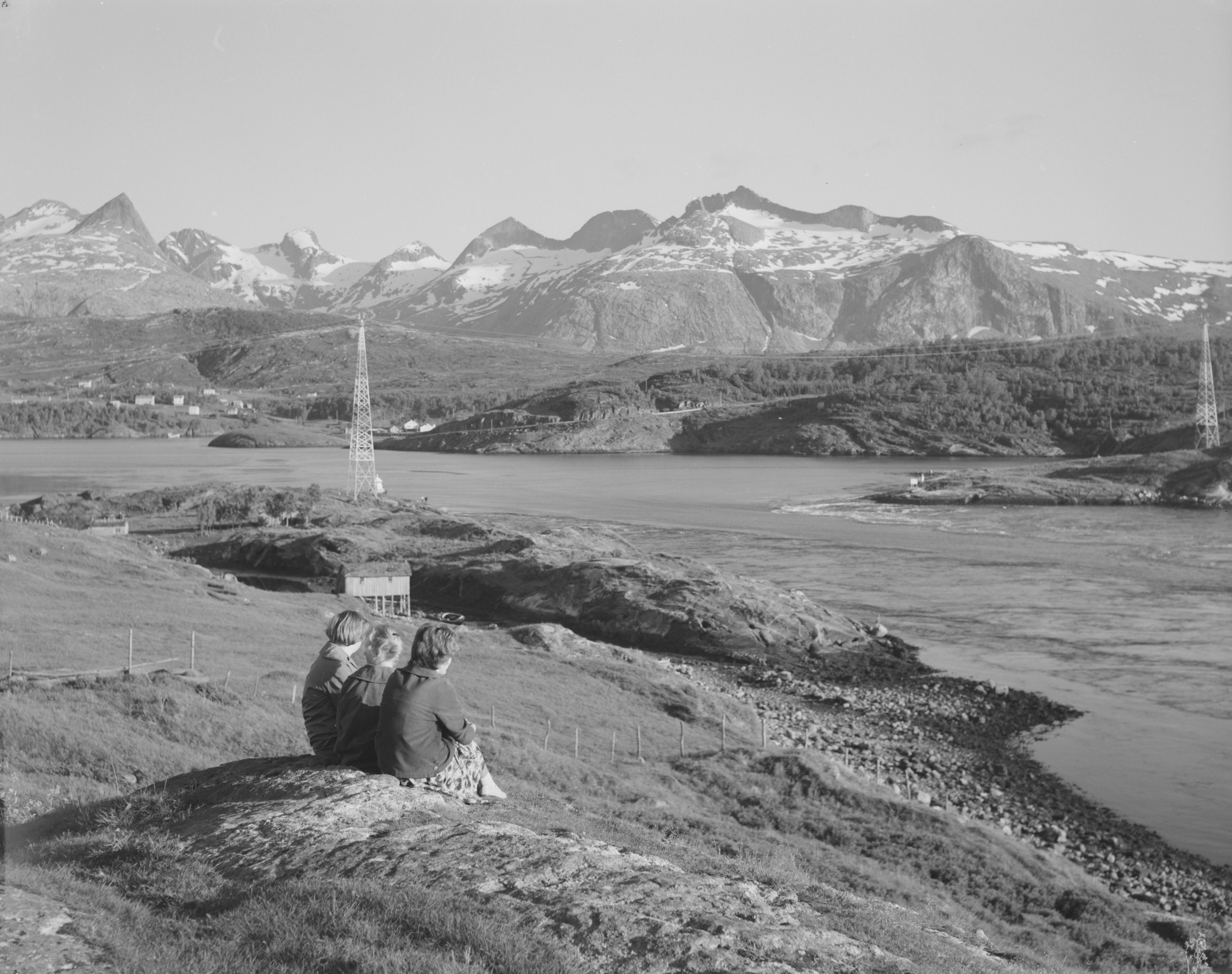
Saltstraumen in Bodin

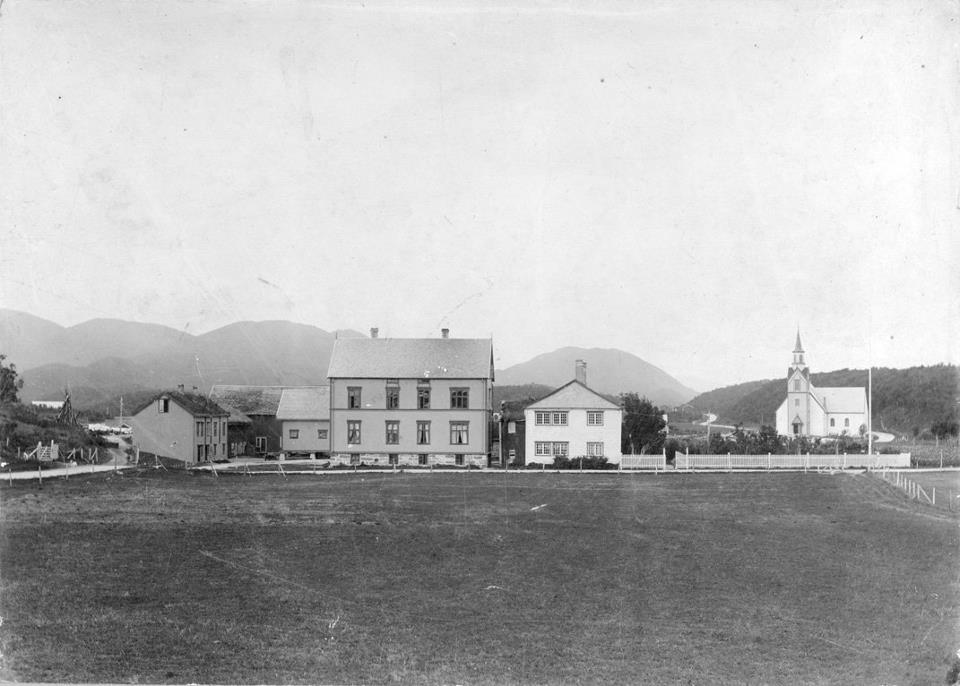
Parsonage in Bodin

The municipality of Bodø landdistrikt was established as a municipality on 1 January 1838 (see formannskapsdistrikt law). It included the rural areas surrounding the town of Bodø. In 1896, the name was changed to Bodin Municipality (Norwegian: Bodin herred). On 1 July 1938, an area of Bodin Municipality (population: 559) was transferred to the town of Bodø. On 1 January 1959, another area of Bodin Municipality (population: 1,303) was transferred to the town of Bodø. On 1 January 1963, an area of Skjerstad Municipality (population: 224) was transferred to Bodin Municipality.

During the 1960s, there were many municipal mergers across Norway due to the work of the Schei Committee. On 1 January 1964, the majority of Kjerringøy Municipality (population: 524) and the Øyjord area of Sørfold Municipality (population: 81) were merged into Bodin. Then on 1 January 1968, all of Bodin Municipality (population: 13,323) was merged with the town of Bodø (population: 14,252) to create a new, much larger, Bodø Municipality. Upon merging, Bodin had a population of 13,323 and Bodø had a population of 14,252.

=== Name ===
Until 1896, the name of the municipality was Bodø landdistrikt, meaning "the rural district of Bodø". The town of Bodø is named after the old Bodøgård farm meaning "the farm (gård) of Bodø". The Old Norse form of the farm's name was Boðin or Boðvin, and the municipality (originally the parish) was named after it because the first church (Bodin Church) was built on its ground. The meaning of the first element is, maybe, boði which means "skerry". The last element is vin which means "meadow" or "pasture". In 1896, the municipality was renamed Bodin which is a more modern version of the older Old Norse form Boðvin.

=== Churches ===
The Church of Norway had two parishes (sokn) within Bodin Municipality. At the time of the municipal dissolution, it was part of the Bodin prestegjeld and the Bodø domprosti (arch-deanery) in the Diocese of Sør-Hålogaland.

Churches in Bodin Municipality
Parish (sokn)	Church name	Location of the church	Year built
Bodin	Bodin Church	Bodø	1240
Bodin	Helligvær Church	Helligvær	1899
Bodin	Landegode Church	Fenes	1920
Straumen	Saltstraumen Church	Saltstraumen	1886

== Geography ==
Bodin was a large municipality encompassing all of the mainland area around the town of Bodø and part of the land on the southern shore of the Saltfjorden. The municipality also included over 100 square kilometres (39 sq mi) of islands, notably the islands of Helligvær, Landegode, Bliksvær, and Givær plus numerous others. In all there were over 700 islands, islets, and skerries in Bodin Municipality. The highest point in the municipality was the 1,284.52-metre (4,214.3 ft) tall mountain Lurfjelltinden, located on the border with Beiarn Municipality and Skjerstad Municipality.

== Government ==
While it existed, Bodin Municipality was responsible for primary education (through 10th grade), outpatient health services, senior citizen services, welfare and other social services, zoning, economic development, and municipal roads and utilities. The municipality was governed by a municipal council of directly elected representatives. The mayor was indirectly elected by a vote of the municipal council. The municipality was under the jurisdiction of the Hålogaland Court of Appeal.

=== Municipal council ===
The municipal council (Herredsstyre) of Bodin Municipality was made up of representatives that were elected to four year terms. The tables below show the historical composition of the council by political party.

Bodin herredsstyre 1963–1967
Party name (in Norwegian)	Number of representatives
Labour Party (Arbeiderpartiet)	23
Conservative Party (Høyre)	10
Christian Democratic Party (Kristelig Folkeparti)	6
Centre Party (Senterpartiet)	3
Socialist People's Party (Sosialistisk Folkeparti)	1
Liberal Party (Venstre)	2
Total number of members:	45
Note: On 1 January 1968, Bodin Municipality became part of Bodø Municipality.

Bodin herredsstyre 1959–1963
Party name (in Norwegian)	Number of representatives
Labour Party (Arbeiderpartiet)	16
Conservative Party (Høyre)	7
Christian Democratic Party (Kristelig Folkeparti)	7
Centre Party (Senterpartiet)	2
Liberal Party (Venstre)	2
Local List(s) (Lokale lister)	1
Total number of members:	35

Bodin herredsstyre 1955–1959
Party name (in Norwegian)	Number of representatives
Labour Party (Arbeiderpartiet)	17
Conservative Party (Høyre)	5
Christian Democratic Party (Kristelig Folkeparti)	7
Farmers' Party (Bondepartiet)	2
Liberal Party (Venstre)	1
Local List(s) (Lokale lister)	3
Total number of members:	35

Bodin herredsstyre 1951–1955
Party name (in Norwegian)	Number of representatives
Labour Party (Arbeiderpartiet)	11
Conservative Party (Høyre)	3
Christian Democratic Party (Kristelig Folkeparti)	4
Farmers' Party (Bondepartiet)	2
Liberal Party (Venstre)	2
Local List(s) (Lokale lister)	2
Total number of members:	24

Bodin herredsstyre 1947–1951
Party name (in Norwegian)	Number of representatives
Labour Party (Arbeiderpartiet)	13
Christian Democratic Party (Kristelig Folkeparti)	2
Liberal Party (Venstre)	3
Joint List(s) of Non-Socialist Parties (Borgerlige Felleslister)	6
Total number of members:	24

Bodin herredsstyre 1945–1947
Party name (in Norwegian)	Number of representatives
Labour Party (Arbeiderpartiet)	15
Liberal Party (Venstre)	5
Joint List(s) of Non-Socialist Parties (Borgerlige Felleslister)	3
Local List(s) (Lokale lister)	1
Total number of members:	24

Bodin herredsstyre 1937–1941*
Party name (in Norwegian)	Number of representatives
Labour Party (Arbeiderpartiet)	11
Farmers' Party (Bondepartiet)	1
Liberal Party (Venstre)	6
Joint List(s) of Non-Socialist Parties (Borgerlige Felleslister)	6
Total number of members:	24
Note: Due to the German occupation of Norway during World War II, no elections were held for new municipal councils until after the war ended in 1945.

=== Mayors ===
The mayor (Norwegian: ordfører) of Bodin Municipality was the political leader of the municipality and the chairperson of the municipal council. Here is a list of people who held this position:

- 1838–1840: Fredrik Ludvig Møller
- 1840–1842: Marcus Fredrik Steen
- 1842–1844: Jacob B. L. Tohrsen
- 1844–1848: Jacob Coldevin
- 1848–1852: Eiler Hagerup Krog Prytz Sr.
- 1852–1856: Jacob Coldevin
- 1856–1858: Peter Holm
- 1858–1866: E. Boye
- 1867–1868: Johan Andreassen
- 1869–1874: Christen Evjenth
- 1875–1880: Peter Johannes Engen
- 1881–1883: Wilhelm August Kiønig
- 1884–1889: M. Lundeberg
- 1890–1892: Ole Anderssen
- 1892–1894: Karl Løkke
- 1895–1898: Olaus Holter
- 1899–1901: Gustav Theodor Baumann (V)
- 1902–1904: L.K. Christie
- 1904–1909: Haakon Evjenth
- 1909–1928: Ole Løkke
- 1929–1931: Arnt Gurnerius Holm (FV)
- 1932–1940: Severin Edvardsson
- 1941–1941: S.U. Johansen (NS)
- 1941–1944: Halvdan Zahl (NS)
- 1944–1945: Fredrik Korsvik Rasmussen (NS)
- 1945–1945: Severin Edvardsson
- 1946–1951: Gregorius Honstad
- 1952–1955: Hans Berg (KrF)
- 1956–1959: Edgar Gundersen
- 1960–1963: Odd Henning Grønmo
- 1964–1968: Henry Forsaa (Ap)

== Notable people ==
- Adelsteen Normann (1848-1918), a painter
- Reidar Carlsen (1908- 1987), a politician for the Labour Party of Norway

== See also ==
- List of former municipalities of Norway
