= Haakon Martin Evjenth =

Norwegian politician (1865–1934)

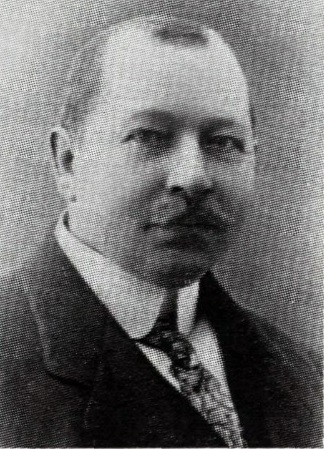

Minister of Justice
- In office 15 February 1928 – 21 November 1930
- Prime Minister: J. L. Mowinckel
- Preceded by: Cornelius Holmboe
- Succeeded by: Arne T. Sunde

Mayor of Bodø
- In office 1 January 1926 – 15 February 1928
- Preceded by: Ove Christian O. Owe
- Succeeded by: Johannes Høyer
- In office 1 January 1916 – 31 December 1916
- Preceded by: Ole Kristian Pedersen Bakken
- Succeeded by: Christian Jakhelln
- In office 1 January 1901 – 1 August 1901
- Preceded by: Christian Jakhelln
- Succeeded by: Christian Jakhelln

Mayor of Bodin
- In office 1 January 1904 – 1 January 1909
- Preceded by: L. K. Christie
- Succeeded by: Ole Løkke Hernes

Personal details
- Born: 17 July 1865 Bodin, Nordland, Sweden-Norway
- Died: 16 November 1934 (aged 69) Bodø, Nordland, Norway
- Party: Liberal
- Spouse: Martha Backer
- Children: Håkon Evjenth; Annemarta Borgen

Haakon Martin Evjenth (17 July 1865 – 16 November 1934) was a Norwegian politician for the Liberal Party. He was Minister of Justice 1928–1930. Evjenth was a barrister by profession.

He was the father of jurist and children's writer Håkon Evjenth.
