= Heggmovatnet =

Lake in Bodø, Norway

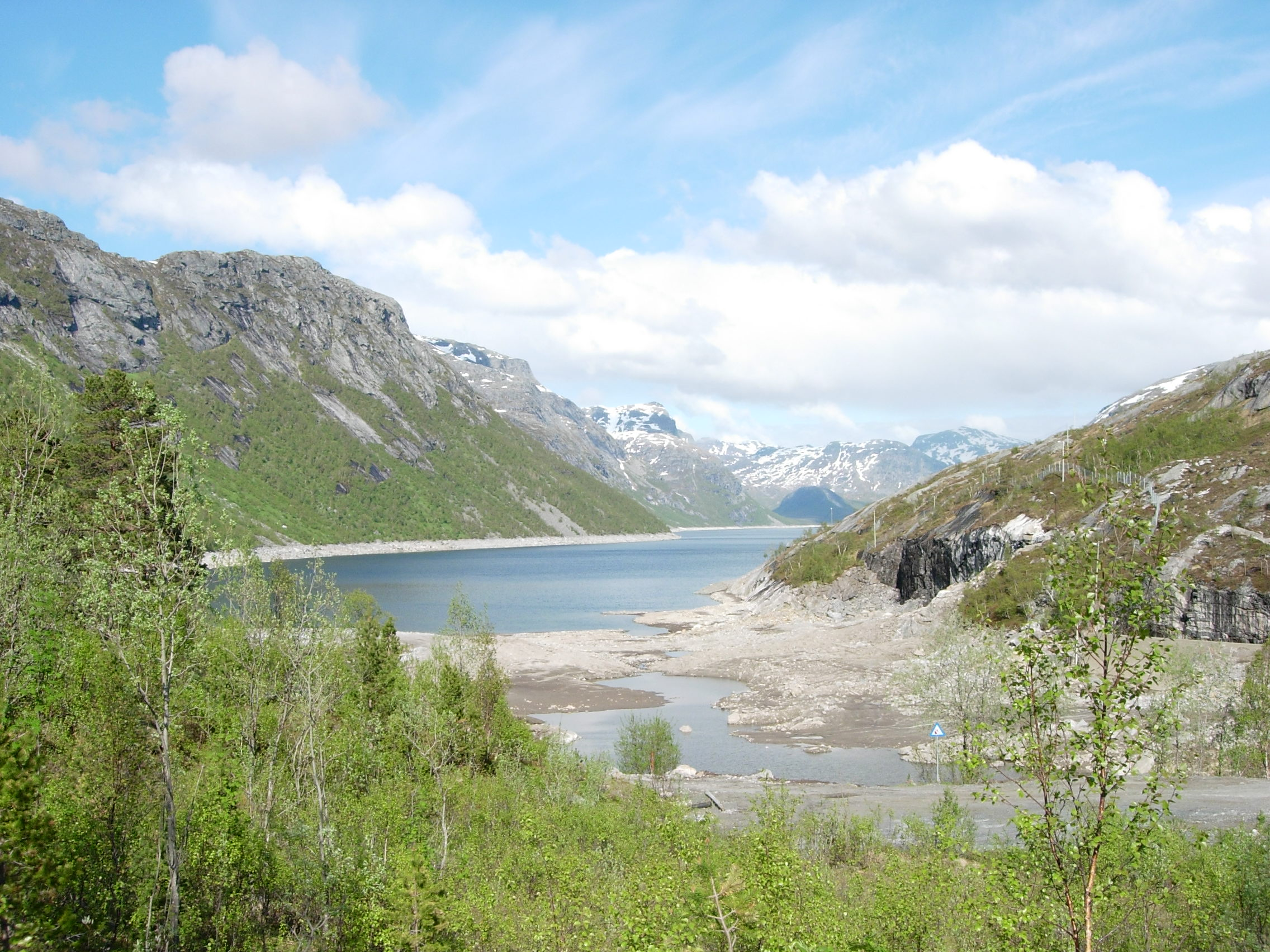
- Interactive map of the lake
- Location: Bodø Municipality, Nordland
- Coordinates: 67.3790°N 14.9668°E
- Primary outflows: Heggmoelva
- Basin countries: Norway
- Max. length: 10 kilometres (6.2 mi)
- Max. width: 1.5 kilometres (0.93 mi)
- Surface area: 9.38 km^{2} (3.62 sq mi)
- Shore length^{1}: 22.42 kilometres (13.93 mi)
- Surface elevation: 131 metres (430 ft)
- References: NVE
- ^{1} Shore length is not a well-defined measure.

Heggmovatnet is a lake that lies in Bodø Municipality in Nordland county, Norway. The 9.38-square-kilometre (3.62 sq mi) lake is located about 10 kilometres (6.2 mi) northeast of the village of Løding. The lake is regulated and it is the main water source for the town of Bodø. The water flows out of the lake into the river Heggmoelva, which then flows into the lake Vatnvatnet. Sjunkhatten National Park surrounds the lake.

== See also ==
- List of lakes in Norway
- Geography of Norway
