= Vatnvatnet =

Lake in Bodø, Norway

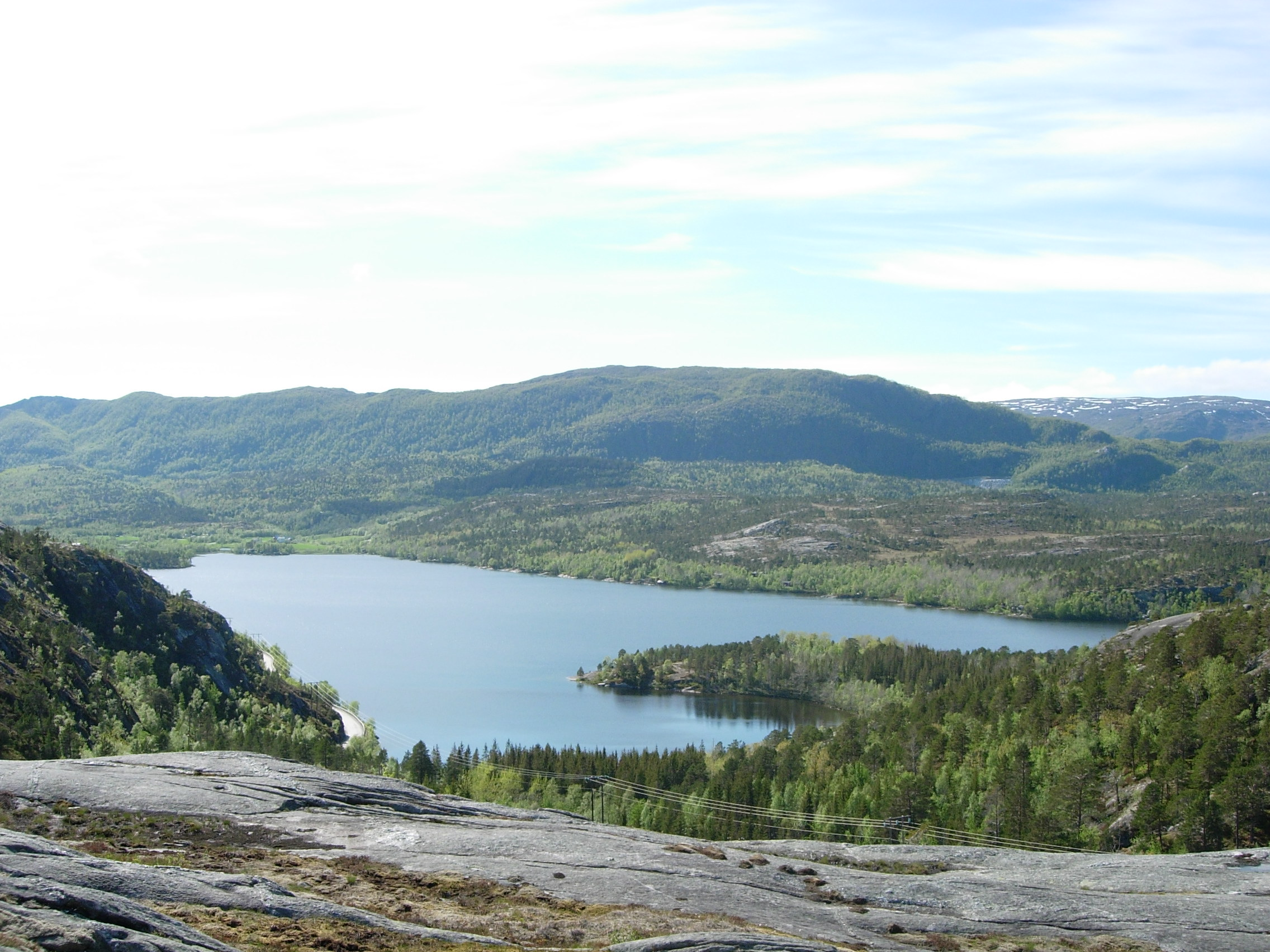
- Interactive map of the lake
- Location: Bodø Municipality, Nordland
- Coordinates: 67.3348°N 14.7847°E
- Basin countries: Norway
- Max. length: 6 kilometres (3.7 mi)
- Max. width: 1.5 kilometres (0.93 mi)
- Surface area: 4.71 km^{2} (1.82 sq mi)
- Shore length^{1}: 27.14 kilometres (16.86 mi)
- Surface elevation: 4 metres (13 ft)
- References: NVE
- ^{1} Shore length is not a well-defined measure.

Vatnvatnet (lit. 'the water water') is a lake that lies in Bodø Municipality in Nordland county, Norway. The 4.71-square-kilometre (1.82 sq mi) lake lies about 2 kilometres (1.2 mi) north of the village of Løding and just south of the Sjunkhatten National Park. The lake Heggmovatnet flows out into this lake.

== See also ==
- List of lakes in Norway
- Geography of Norway
