= Bodø Municipality =

Municipality in Nordland, Norway

Bodø Municipality Bodø kommune
- Municipality
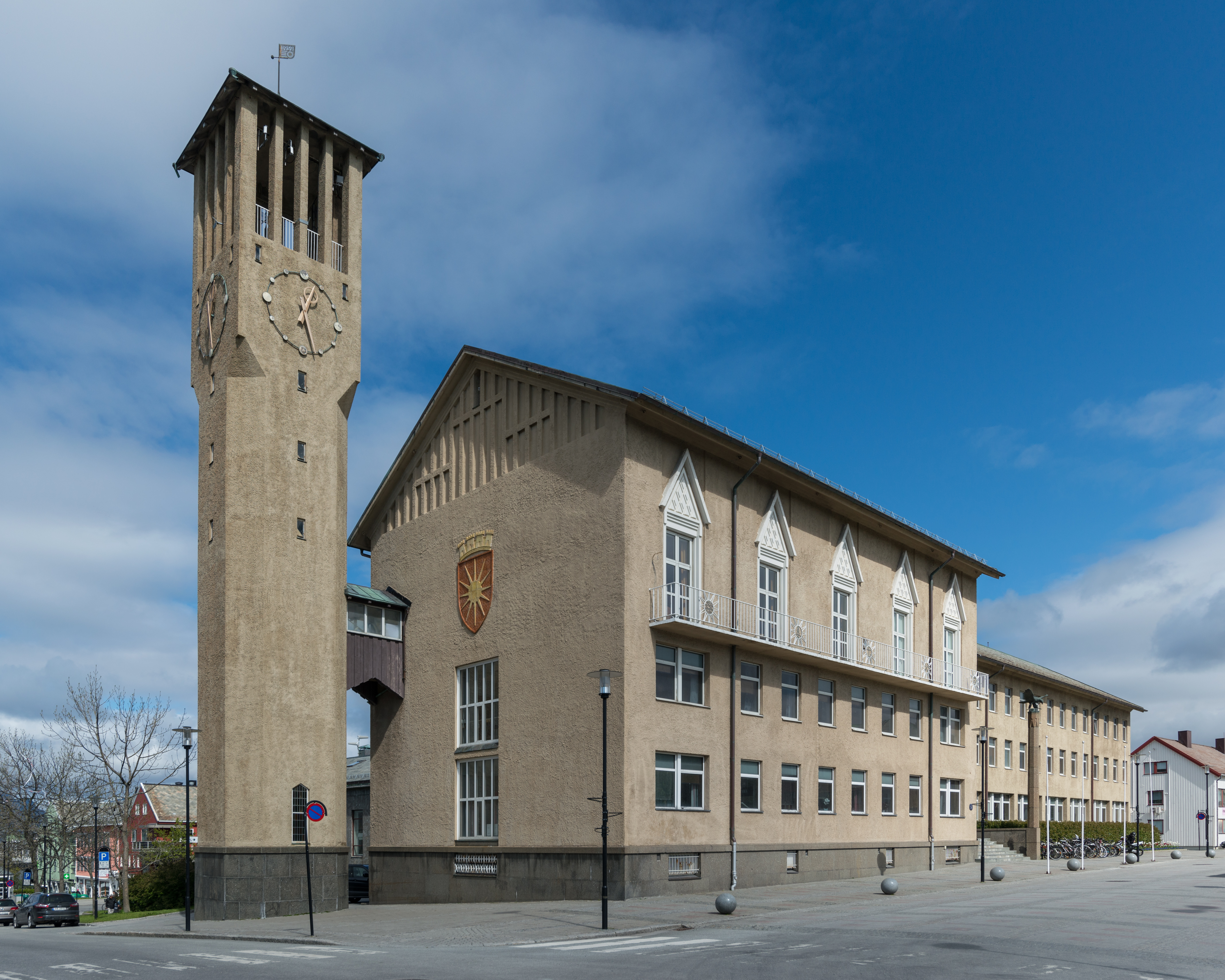
- Bodø Town Hall in 2015

- Flag Coat of arms

- Nordland within Norway

- Bodø within Nordland
- Coordinates: 67.2827°N 14.3751°E
- Country: Norway
- County: Nordland
- District: Salten
- Established: 1 Jan 1838
  - Created as: Formannskapsdistrikt
- Administrative centre: Bodø

Government
  - Mayor (2023): Odd Emil Ingebrigtsen (H)

Area
  - Total: 1,395.30 km^{2} (538.73 sq mi)
  - Land: 1,311.08 km^{2} (506.21 sq mi)
  - Water: 84.22 km^{2} (32.52 sq mi) 6%
  - Rank: #66 in Norway
- Highest elevation: 1,284.52 m (4,214.3 ft)

Population (2024)
  - Total: 53,712
  - Rank: #19 in Norway
  - Density: 38.5/km^{2} (100/sq mi)
  - Change (10 years): ▲ +8%

Official language
  - Norwegian form: Neutral
- Time zone: UTC+01:00 (CET)
  - Summer (DST): UTC+02:00 (CEST)
- ISO 3166 code: NO-1804
- Website: Official website

Bodø (Lule Sami: Bådåddjo, Swedish: Bodö) is a municipality in Nordland county, Norway. It is part of the traditional region of Salten. The administrative centre of the municipality is the town of Bodø (which is also the capital of Nordland county). Some of the notable villages in Bodø include Misvær, Skjerstad, Saltstraumen, Løding, Løpsmarka, Kjerringøy, Sørvær, and Fenes.

The 1,395-square-kilometre (539 sq mi) municipality is the 66th largest by area out of the 357 municipalities in Norway. Bodø Municipality is the 19th most populous municipality in Norway with a population of 53,712. The municipality's population density is 38.5 inhabitants per square kilometre (100/sq mi) and its population has increased by 8% over the previous 10-year period. The municipality of Bodø is located just north of the Arctic Circle and the town of Bodø (population: 42,831; about 80% of the residents of the municipality), is the largest urban area and town in Nordland county, and the second largest town in North Norway.

Bodø was named one of the European Capitals of Culture for 2024. It is also home to football club Bodø/Glimt, the northernmost club to win a European national league competition (namely Eliteserien, the championship of Norway).

== History ==
The municipality is named after the old Bodøgård farm (Old Norse: Boðvin), since the town was built on its ground. The first element might be boði which means "sunken rock" or "skerry" and the last element is vin which means "meadow" or "pasture". The last element may have been misunderstood as øy which means "island" (and written with the Danish language form ø).

== Coat of arms ==
The coat of arms was first approved in 1889. It showed a midnight sun above a boat on the sea in front of a mountain range. The current version which is a simplified, modern version of the old arms was granted on 24 July 1959. The official blazon is "Gules, a sun Or" (Norwegian: På rød bunn en gull sol). This means the arms have a red field (background) and the charge is a sun. The sun has a tincture of Or which means it is commonly colored yellow, but if it is made out of metal, then gold is used. The sun was chosen since Bodø was the first town in Northern Norway, and it experiences the midnight sun every year. The arms were designed by Hallvard Trætteberg.

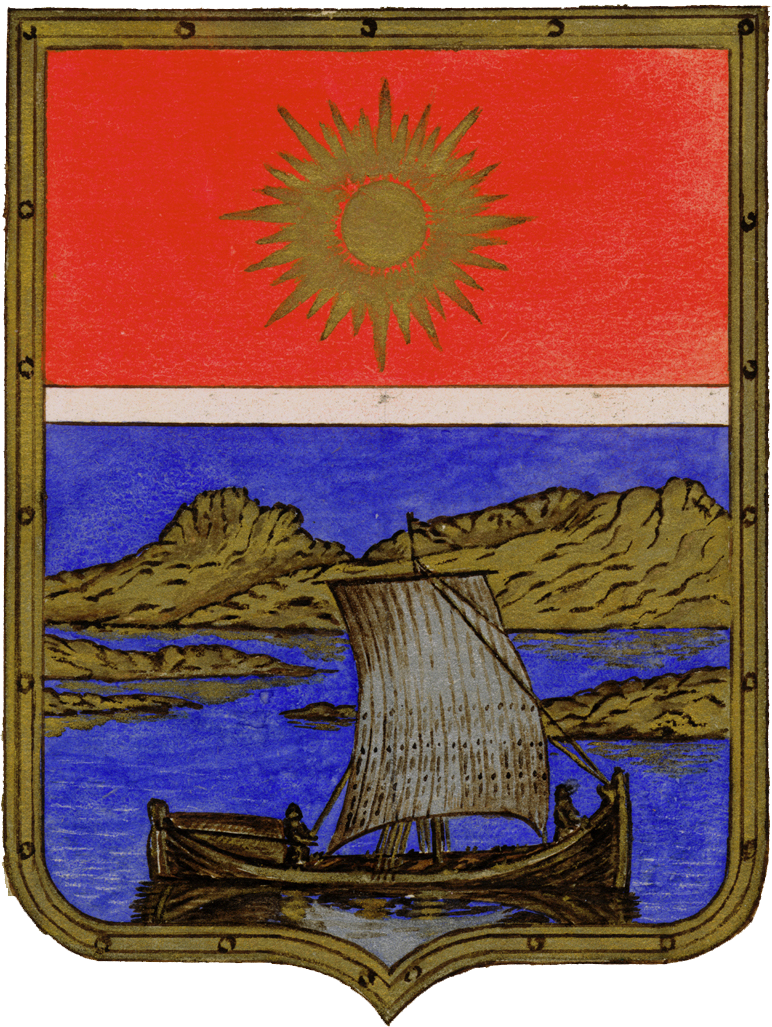
Old arms (1889–1959)

Current arms (since 1959)

== Geography ==
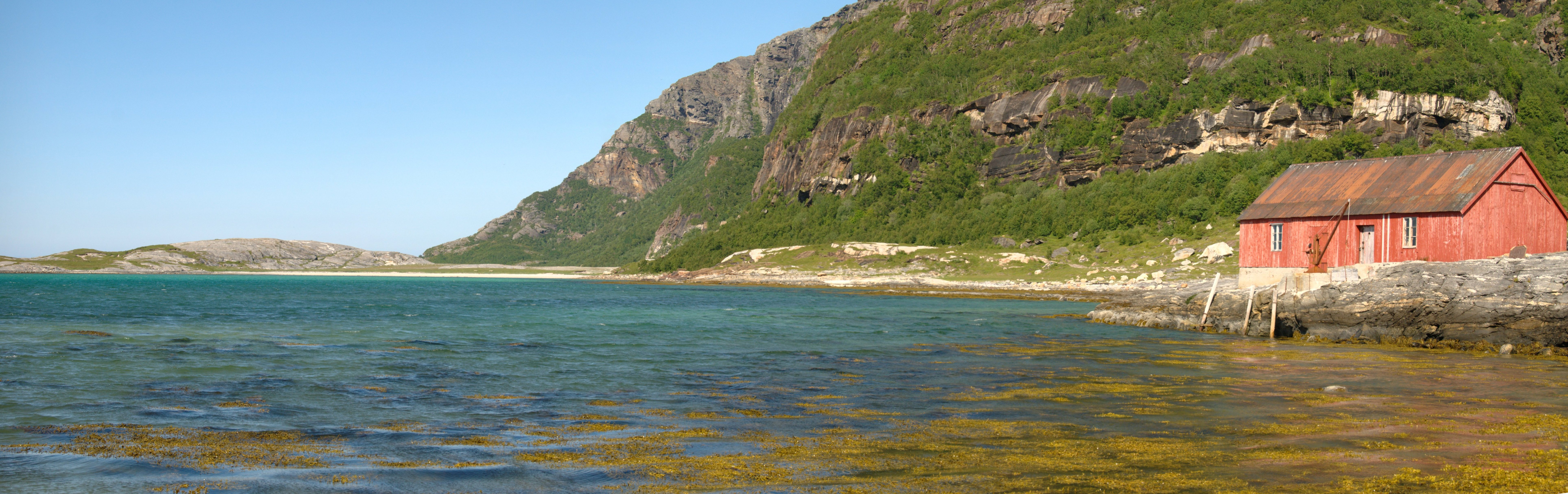
Mjelle in Bodø, a popular beach area on warm summer days

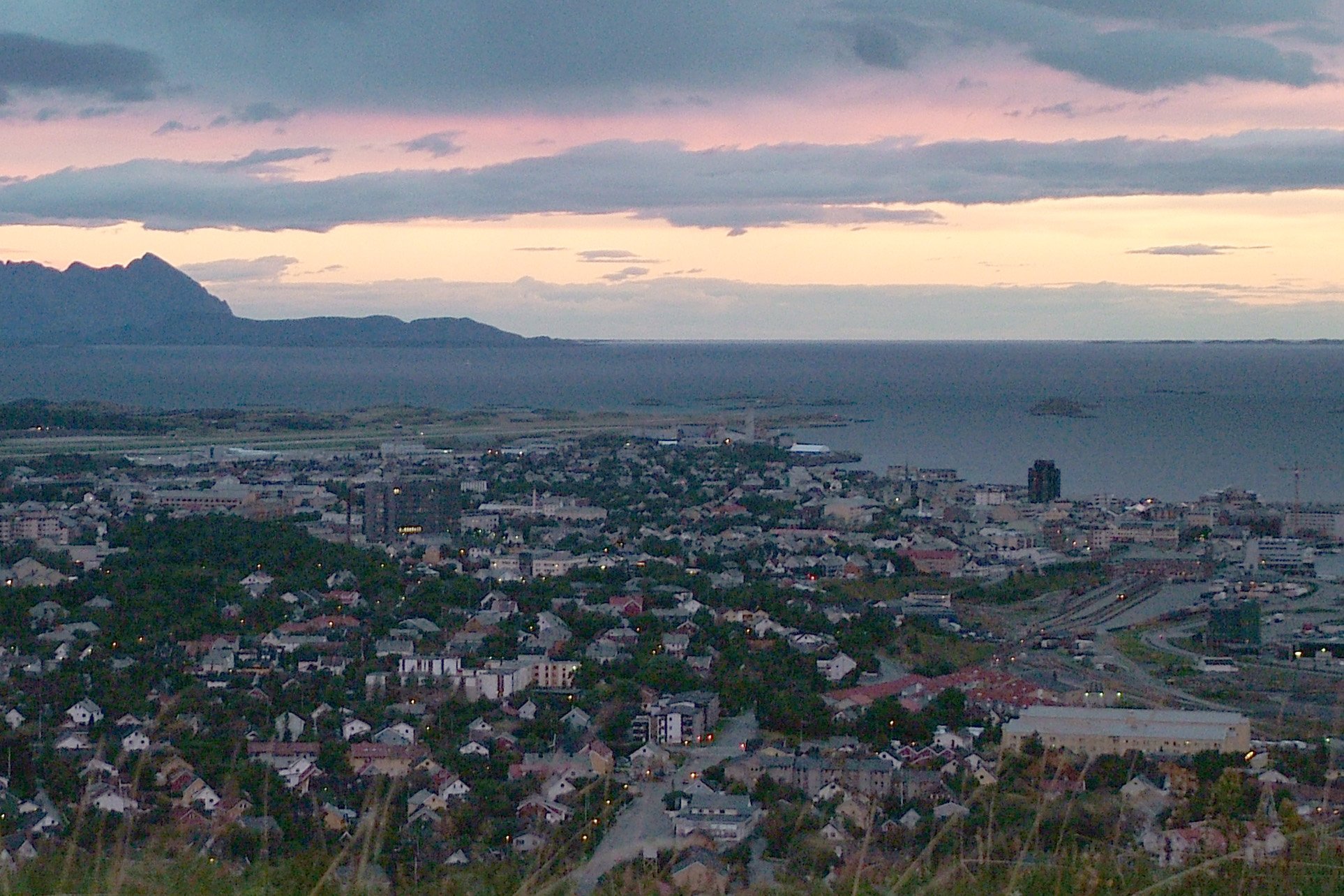
Bodø is a compact town. The airport (left), harbour (upper right) and railway station (lower right) are all within walking distance of each other.

The municipality lies just north of the Arctic Circle where the midnight sun is visible from 1 June to 13 July. Due to atmospheric refraction, there is no true polar night in Bodø, but because of the mountains south of Bodø, the sun is not visible in parts of the municipality from early December to early January. The average number of sun-hours in Bodø is highest in June with a daily average of 22.1 hours.

Bodø Municipality is located along the Skjerstadfjorden, south of Steigen Municipality, west of Sørfold Municipality and Fauske Municipality, northwest of Saltdal Municipality, and northeast of Beiarn Municipality and Gildeskål Municipality. There are two island municipalities located to the west of Bodø Municipality: Røst Municipality and Værøy Municipality.

Amongst the strongest tidal currents in the world, with water speeds reaching 22 knots (41 km/h; 25 mph), is Saltstraumen, situated about 30 kilometres (19 mi) southeast of Bodø. The village of Kjerringøy is a well preserved old trading village on the coast about 40 kilometres (25 mi) north of the town of Bodø. With its scenic setting and authentic buildings, several movies have been shot at this little port, including Benoni og Rosa (based on Knut Hamsun's novel), I am Dina, and Telegrafisten.

The highest point in the municipality is the 1,284.52-metre (4,214.3 ft) tall mountain Lurfjelltinden, on the border of Beiarn Municipality. The Skjerstad Fjord, in the eastern part of Bodø, passes through the Saltstraumen into the Saltfjorden. The Saltfjorden then flows west into the Vestfjorden. Lakes in the region include Fjærvatnet, Gjømmervatnet, Heggmovatnet, Soløyvatnet, Valnesvatnet, and Vatnvatnet.

There are also several islands and island groups in Bodø. The islands of Straumøya and Knaplundsøya are in the Saltfjorden. Several bridges connect these islands to the mainland: Åselistraumen Bridge, Indre Sunnan Bridge, and Saltstraumen Bridge. The islands of Landegode, Helligvær, Bliksvær, and Karlsøyvær all lie in the Vestfjorden. Several lighthouses are also located out in the Vestfjorden: Bjørnøy Lighthouse, Grytøy Lighthouse, Landegode Lighthouse, Nyholmen Lighthouse, and Tennholmen Lighthouse.

=== Nature ===
Besides Saltstraumen, the municipality of Bodø has much wilderness for hikers. About 10 kilometres (6.2 mi) north of the town of Bodø lies the popular recreation area Geitvågen. The area is inhabited by a large number of white-tailed eagles. Sjunkhatten National Park is partly located in Bodø municipality, and there are also 17 nature reserves. Sundstraumlian nature reserve has undisturbed mixed forest with marble bedrock, Skånland with coastal pine forest, Børvatnet protecting a birch forest with many orchids, and Bliksvær nature reserve with well-preserved coastal nature of many types and a rich bird life, making it a Ramsar site as well.

== Climate ==
Bodø features a humid continental climate (Dfb) or, if the original Köppen winter threshold −3 °C (27 °F) is used, an oceanic climate (Cfb) in the 1991-2020 base period. Winters are fairly cold and summers are cool. The "midnight sun" is above the horizon from 1 June to 14 July (44 days), and the period with continuous daylight lasts a bit longer. The all-time low −18.5 °C (−1.3 °F) was recorded in February 1966. The all-time high 30.7 °C (87.3 °F) was set in July 2019. The warmest night recorded was June 29, 1972 with overnight low 21.7 °C (71.1 °F). The average date for the first overnight freeze (below 0 °C (32.0 °F)) in autumn is October 12 (1981-2010 average). The driest month on record was January 2014 with no precipitation at all, while the wettest was September 2009 with 293 mm.

Climate data for Bodø VI 1991–2020 (16 m, extremes 1953–2022 from Bodø Airport, sunhours 1991–2005 from Bodø Airport)
| Month | Jan | Feb | Mar | Apr | May | Jun | Jul | Aug | Sep | Oct | Nov | Dec | Year |
|---|---|---|---|---|---|---|---|---|---|---|---|---|---|
| Record high °C (°F) | 11.8 (53.2) | 9.6 (49.3) | 11.8 (53.2) | 18.2 (64.8) | 24.5 (76.1) | 29.9 (85.8) | 30.7 (87.3) | 28.2 (82.8) | 24.3 (75.7) | 18.8 (65.8) | 16.2 (61.2) | 10.1 (50.2) | 30.7 (87.3) |
| Mean daily maximum °C (°F) | 1.7 (35.1) | 1.3 (34.3) | 2.5 (36.5) | 6 (43) | 10.2 (50.4) | 13.8 (56.8) | 16.9 (62.4) | 16.3 (61.3) | 12.8 (55.0) | 7.7 (45.9) | 4.6 (40.3) | 2.9 (37.2) | 8.1 (46.5) |
| Daily mean °C (°F) | −0.5 (31.1) | −1 (30) | 0.2 (32.4) | 3.4 (38.1) | 7.3 (45.1) | 10.8 (51.4) | 13.6 (56.5) | 13.2 (55.8) | 10.1 (50.2) | 5.6 (42.1) | 2.6 (36.7) | 0.8 (33.4) | 5.5 (41.9) |
| Mean daily minimum °C (°F) | −2.8 (27.0) | −3.2 (26.2) | −2 (28) | 0.9 (33.6) | 4.6 (40.3) | 8.1 (46.6) | 10.8 (51.4) | 10.6 (51.1) | 7.8 (46.0) | 3.5 (38.3) | 0.5 (32.9) | −1.4 (29.5) | 3.1 (37.6) |
| Record low °C (°F) | −17.1 (1.2) | −18.5 (−1.3) | −15.6 (3.9) | −10.3 (13.5) | −3.9 (25.0) | −1.2 (29.8) | 2.8 (37.0) | 1.7 (35.1) | −2.8 (27.0) | −8.2 (17.2) | −12 (10) | −16.7 (1.9) | −18.5 (−1.3) |
| Average precipitation mm (inches) | 103.6 (4.08) | 78.5 (3.09) | 81.4 (3.20) | 71.1 (2.80) | 64.8 (2.55) | 65.2 (2.57) | 65.7 (2.59) | 84.7 (3.33) | 128.7 (5.07) | 138.3 (5.44) | 116.4 (4.58) | 119 (4.7) | 1,117.4 (44) |
| Average precipitation days (≥ 1.0 mm) | 15 | 14 | 14 | 12 | 12 | 11 | 10 | 12 | 15 | 17 | 15 | 17 | 164 |
| Mean monthly sunshine hours | 8.1 | 46.6 | 106.1 | 179.7 | 210.3 | 219.6 | 192.7 | 151.7 | 120.8 | 69.8 | 20.1 | 0 | 1,325.5 |
Source 1: Norwegian Meteorological Institute (monthly records)
Source 2: NOAA

== Government ==
Bodø Municipality is responsible for primary education (through 10th grade), outpatient health services, senior citizen services, welfare and other social services, zoning, economic development, and municipal roads and utilities. The municipality is governed by a municipal council of directly elected representatives. The mayor is indirectly elected by a vote of the municipal council. The municipality is under the jurisdiction of the Salten og Lofoten District Court and the Hålogaland Court of Appeal.

=== Municipal council ===
The municipal council (Kommunestyre) of Bodø Municipality is made up of 39 representatives that are elected to four year terms. The tables below show the current and historical composition of the council by political party.

Bodø kommunestyre 2023–2027
| Party name (in Norwegian) | Number of representatives |
|---|---|
| Labour Party (Arbeiderpartiet) | 7 |
| Progress Party (Fremskrittspartiet) | 5 |
| Green Party (Miljøpartiet De Grønne) | 1 |
| Conservative Party (Høyre) | 14 |
| Industry and Business Party (Industri‑ og Næringspartiet) | 1 |
| Christian Democratic Party (Kristelig Folkeparti) | 1 |
| Red Party (Rødt) | 2 |
| Centre Party (Senterpartiet) | 1 |
| Socialist Left Party (Sosialistisk Venstreparti) | 4 |
| Liberal Party (Venstre) | 3 |
| Total number of members: | 39 |

Bodø kommunestyre 2019–2023
| Party name (in Norwegian) | Number of representatives |
|---|---|
| Labour Party (Arbeiderpartiet) | 11 |
| Progress Party (Fremskrittspartiet) | 4 |
| Green Party (Miljøpartiet De Grønne) | 2 |
| Conservative Party (Høyre) | 10 |
| Christian Democratic Party (Kristelig Folkeparti) | 1 |
| Red Party (Rødt) | 3 |
| Centre Party (Senterpartiet) | 4 |
| Socialist Left Party (Sosialistisk Venstreparti) | 2 |
| Liberal Party (Venstre) | 2 |
| Total number of members: | 39 |

Bodø kommunestyre 2015–2019
| Party name (in Norwegian) | Number of representatives |
|---|---|
| Labour Party (Arbeiderpartiet) | 12 |
| Progress Party (Fremskrittspartiet) | 4 |
| Green Party (Miljøpartiet De Grønne) | 1 |
| Conservative Party (Høyre) | 13 |
| Christian Democratic Party (Kristelig Folkeparti) | 1 |
| Red Party (Rødt) | 4 |
| Centre Party (Senterpartiet) | 1 |
| Socialist Left Party (Sosialistisk Venstreparti) | 2 |
| Liberal Party (Venstre) | 1 |
| Total number of members: | 39 |

Bodø kommunestyre 2011–2015
| Party name (in Norwegian) | Number of representatives |
|---|---|
| Labour Party (Arbeiderpartiet) | 13 |
| Progress Party (Fremskrittspartiet) | 9 |
| Conservative Party (Høyre) | 9 |
| Christian Democratic Party (Kristelig Folkeparti) | 1 |
| Red Party (Rødt) | 3 |
| Centre Party (Senterpartiet) | 1 |
| Socialist Left Party (Sosialistisk Venstreparti) | 2 |
| Liberal Party (Venstre) | 1 |
| Total number of members: | 39 |

Bodø kommunestyre 2007–2011
| Party name (in Norwegian) | Number of representatives |
|---|---|
| Labour Party (Arbeiderpartiet) | 15 |
| Progress Party (Fremskrittspartiet) | 10 |
| Conservative Party (Høyre) | 5 |
| Christian Democratic Party (Kristelig Folkeparti) | 2 |
| Red Electoral Alliance (Rød Valgallianse) | 2 |
| Centre Party (Senterpartiet) | 2 |
| Socialist Left Party (Sosialistisk Venstreparti) | 2 |
| Liberal Party (Venstre) | 1 |
| Total number of members: | 39 |

Bodø kommunestyre 2003–2007
| Party name (in Norwegian) | Number of representatives |
|---|---|
| Labour Party (Arbeiderpartiet) | 13 |
| Progress Party (Fremskrittspartiet) | 6 |
| Conservative Party (Høyre) | 7 |
| Christian Democratic Party (Kristelig Folkeparti) | 2 |
| Red Electoral Alliance (Rød Valgallianse) | 2 |
| Centre Party (Senterpartiet) | 2 |
| Socialist Left Party (Sosialistisk Venstreparti) | 6 |
| Liberal Party (Venstre) | 1 |
| Total number of members: | 39 |
Note: On 1 January 2005, Skjerstad Municipality became part of Bodø Municipality.

Bodø kommunestyre 1999–2003
| Party name (in Norwegian) | Number of representatives |
|---|---|
| Labour Party (Arbeiderpartiet) | 17 |
| Progress Party (Fremskrittspartiet) | 4 |
| Conservative Party (Høyre) | 12 |
| Christian Democratic Party (Kristelig Folkeparti) | 4 |
| Red Electoral Alliance (Rød Valgallianse) | 2 |
| Centre Party (Senterpartiet) | 2 |
| Socialist Left Party (Sosialistisk Venstreparti) | 5 |
| Liberal Party (Venstre) | 1 |
| Total number of members: | 47 |

Bodø kommunestyre 1995–1999
| Party name (in Norwegian) | Number of representatives |
|---|---|
| Labour Party (Arbeiderpartiet) | 17 |
| Progress Party (Fremskrittspartiet) | 4 |
| Conservative Party (Høyre) | 12 |
| Christian Democratic Party (Kristelig Folkeparti) | 3 |
| Red Electoral Alliance (Rød Valgallianse) | 3 |
| Centre Party (Senterpartiet) | 3 |
| Socialist Left Party (Sosialistisk Venstreparti) | 3 |
| Liberal Party (Venstre) | 2 |
| Total number of members: | 47 |

Bodø kommunestyre 1991–1995
| Party name (in Norwegian) | Number of representatives |
|---|---|
| Labour Party (Arbeiderpartiet) | 15 |
| Progress Party (Fremskrittspartiet) | 2 |
| Conservative Party (Høyre) | 13 |
| Christian Democratic Party (Kristelig Folkeparti) | 2 |
| Red Electoral Alliance (Rød Valgallianse) | 4 |
| Centre Party (Senterpartiet) | 3 |
| Socialist Left Party (Sosialistisk Venstreparti) | 7 |
| Liberal Party (Venstre) | 1 |
| Total number of members: | 47 |

Bodø kommunestyre 1987–1991
| Party name (in Norwegian) | Number of representatives |
|---|---|
| Labour Party (Arbeiderpartiet) | 22 |
| Progress Party (Fremskrittspartiet) | 5 |
| Conservative Party (Høyre) | 16 |
| Christian Democratic Party (Kristelig Folkeparti) | 3 |
| Red Electoral Alliance (Rød Valgallianse) | 1 |
| Centre Party (Senterpartiet) | 1 |
| Socialist Left Party (Sosialistisk Venstreparti) | 5 |
| Liberal Party (Venstre) | 2 |
| Total number of members: | 55 |

Bodø kommunestyre 1983–1987
| Party name (in Norwegian) | Number of representatives |
|---|---|
| Labour Party (Arbeiderpartiet) | 22 |
| Progress Party (Fremskrittspartiet) | 2 |
| Conservative Party (Høyre) | 18 |
| Christian Democratic Party (Kristelig Folkeparti) | 4 |
| Centre Party (Senterpartiet) | 2 |
| Socialist Left Party (Sosialistisk Venstreparti) | 5 |
| Liberal Party (Venstre) | 2 |
| Total number of members: | 55 |

Bodø kommunestyre 1979–1983
| Party name (in Norwegian) | Number of representatives |
|---|---|
| Labour Party (Arbeiderpartiet) | 19 |
| Progress Party (Fremskrittspartiet) | 1 |
| Conservative Party (Høyre) | 21 |
| Christian Democratic Party (Kristelig Folkeparti) | 5 |
| Centre Party (Senterpartiet) | 3 |
| Socialist Left Party (Sosialistisk Venstreparti) | 3 |
| Liberal Party (Venstre) | 3 |
| Total number of members: | 55 |

Bodø kommunestyre 1975–1979
| Party name (in Norwegian) | Number of representatives |
|---|---|
| Labour Party (Arbeiderpartiet) | 21 |
| Anders Lange's Party (Anders Langes parti) | 1 |
| Conservative Party (Høyre) | 17 |
| Christian Democratic Party (Kristelig Folkeparti) | 6 |
| New People's Party (Nye Folkepartiet) | 1 |
| Centre Party (Senterpartiet) | 4 |
| Socialist Left Party (Sosialistisk Venstreparti) | 3 |
| Liberal Party (Venstre) | 2 |
| Total number of members: | 55 |

Bodø kommunestyre 1971–1975
| Party name (in Norwegian) | Number of representatives |
|---|---|
| Labour Party (Arbeiderpartiet) | 24 |
| Conservative Party (Høyre) | 11 |
| Christian Democratic Party (Kristelig Folkeparti) | 5 |
| Centre Party (Senterpartiet) | 6 |
| Socialist People's Party (Sosialistisk Folkeparti) | 4 |
| Liberal Party (Venstre) | 5 |
| Total number of members: | 55 |

Bodø kommunestyre 1967–1971
| Party name (in Norwegian) | Number of representatives |
|---|---|
| Labour Party (Arbeiderpartiet) | 26 |
| Conservative Party (Høyre) | 12 |
| Christian Democratic Party (Kristelig Folkeparti) | 4 |
| Centre Party (Senterpartiet) | 3 |
| Socialist People's Party (Sosialistisk Folkeparti) | 4 |
| Liberal Party (Venstre) | 6 |
| Total number of members: | 55 |
Note: On 1 January 1968, Bodin Municipality became part of Bodø Municipality.

Bodø bystyre 1963–1967
| Party name (in Norwegian) | Number of representatives |
|---|---|
| Labour Party (Arbeiderpartiet) | 24 |
| Conservative Party (Høyre) | 12 |
| Christian Democratic Party (Kristelig Folkeparti) | 2 |
| Socialist People's Party (Sosialistisk Folkeparti) | 1 |
| Liberal Party (Venstre) | 6 |
| Total number of members: | 45 |

Bodø bystyre 1959–1963
| Party name (in Norwegian) | Number of representatives |
|---|---|
| Labour Party (Arbeiderpartiet) | 22 |
| Conservative Party (Høyre) | 12 |
| Communist Party (Kommunistiske Parti) | 1 |
| Christian Democratic Party (Kristelig Folkeparti) | 3 |
| Liberal Party (Venstre) | 7 |
| Total number of members: | 45 |

Bodø bystyre 1955–1959
| Party name (in Norwegian) | Number of representatives |
|---|---|
| Labour Party (Arbeiderpartiet) | 19 |
| Conservative Party (Høyre) | 11 |
| Communist Party (Kommunistiske Parti) | 1 |
| Christian Democratic Party (Kristelig Folkeparti) | 3 |
| Liberal Party (Venstre) | 3 |
| Total number of members: | 37 |

Bodø bystyre 1951–1955
| Party name (in Norwegian) | Number of representatives |
|---|---|
| Labour Party (Arbeiderpartiet) | 18 |
| Conservative Party (Høyre) | 9 |
| Communist Party (Kommunistiske Parti) | 1 |
| Christian Democratic Party (Kristelig Folkeparti) | 2 |
| Liberal Party (Venstre) | 6 |
| Total number of members: | 36 |

Bodø bystyre 1947–1951
| Party name (in Norwegian) | Number of representatives |
|---|---|
| Labour Party (Arbeiderpartiet) | 17 |
| Conservative Party (Høyre) | 8 |
| Communist Party (Kommunistiske Parti) | 2 |
| Liberal Party (Venstre) | 7 |
| Local List(s) (Lokale lister) | 2 |
| Total number of members: | 36 |

Bodø bystyre 1945–1947
| Party name (in Norwegian) | Number of representatives |
|---|---|
| Labour Party (Arbeiderpartiet) | 14 |
| Conservative Party (Høyre) | 5 |
| Communist Party (Kommunistiske Parti) | 2 |
| Liberal Party (Venstre) | 5 |
| Local List(s) (Lokale lister) | 2 |
| Total number of members: | 28 |

Bodø bystyre 1937–1941*
| Party name (in Norwegian) | Number of representatives |
|---|---|
| Labour Party (Arbeiderpartiet) | 12 |
| Liberal Party (Venstre) | 5 |
| Joint list of the Conservative Party (Høyre) and the Free-minded People's Party (Frisinnede Folkeparti) | 11 |
| Total number of members: | 28 |
Note: Due to the German occupation of Norway during World War II, no elections were held for new municipal councils until after the war ended in 1945.

Bodø bystyre 1934–1937
| Party name (in Norwegian) | Number of representatives |
|---|---|
| Labour Party (Arbeiderpartiet) | 10 |
| Temperance Party (Avholdspartiet) | 3 |
| Liberal Party (Venstre) | 2 |
| Joint list of the Conservative Party (Høyre) and the Free-minded People's Party (Frisinnede Folkeparti) | 13 |
| Total number of members: | 28 |

Bodø bystyre 1931–1934
| Party name (in Norwegian) | Number of representatives |
|---|---|
| Labour Party (Arbeiderpartiet) | 8 |
| Temperance Party (Avholdspartiet) | 5 |
| Liberal Party (Venstre) | 3 |
| Joint list of the Conservative Party (Høyre) and the Free-minded People's Party (Frisinnede Folkeparti) | 12 |
| Total number of members: | 28 |

Bodø bystyre 1928–1931
| Party name (in Norwegian) | Number of representatives |
|---|---|
| Labour Party (Arbeiderpartiet) | 9 |
| Temperance Party (Avholdspartiet) | 7 |
| Liberal Party (Venstre) | 3 |
| Joint list of the Conservative Party (Høyre) and the Free-minded Liberal Party (Frisinnede Venstre) | 9 |
| Total number of members: | 28 |

Bodø bystyre 1925–1928
| Party name (in Norwegian) | Number of representatives |
|---|---|
| Labour Party (Arbeiderpartiet) | 4 |
| Temperance Party (Avholdspartiet) | 8 |
| Joint List(s) of Non-Socialist Parties (Borgerlige Felleslister) | 10 |
| Local List(s) (Lokale lister) | 6 |
| Total number of members: | 28 |

Bodø bystyre 1922–1925
| Party name (in Norwegian) | Number of representatives |
|---|---|
| Labour Party (Arbeiderpartiet) | 5 |
| Temperance Party (Avholdspartiet) | 8 |
| Joint List(s) of Non-Socialist Parties (Borgerlige Felleslister) | 13 |
| Local List(s) (Lokale lister) | 2 |
| Total number of members: | 28 |

Bodø bystyre 1919–1922
| Party name (in Norwegian) | Number of representatives |
|---|---|
| Labour Party (Arbeiderpartiet) | 6 |
| Temperance Party (Avholdspartiet) | 8 |
| Joint List(s) of Non-Socialist Parties (Borgerlige Felleslister) | 14 |
| Total number of members: | 28 |

=== Mayors ===
The mayor (Norwegian: ordfører) of Bodø Municipality is the political leader of the municipality and the chairperson of the municipal council. Here is a list of people who have held this position:

- 1838–1841: Severin Frederich Holmer
- 1842–1842: Melchior Koch
- 1843–1843: Mads Mortensen
- 1844–1844: Johan Tønnessen
- 1844–1845: Mads Mortensen
- 1846–1846: Jakob Lorentz Bar Tohrsen
- 1846–1847: Joachim Andreas Koht
- 1847–1850: Jakob Lorentz Bar Tohrsen
- 1850–1851: Severin Frederich Holmer
- 1851–1852: Melchior Koch
- 1852–1853: Berent Pettersen
- 1853–1854: Lorentz Wittrup Lied
- 1854–1854: Stig Othard Arntzen
- 1855–1855: Jens Width
- 1856–1857: Ole M. Groth
- 1857–1858: Stig Othard Arntzen
- 1858–1859: Jens Cornelius Koch
- 1859–1860: Ole M. Groth
- 1860–1861: Jens Cornelius Koch
- 1861–1862: Vilhelm Bernhard Jentoft
- 1862–1863: Carl Jakhelln
- 1863–1864: Hans H. Koch
- 1864–1865: Stig Othard Arntzen
- 1865–1866: Ole M. Groth
- 1866–1867: Christian Albrigt Jakhelln
- 1867–1868: Ole M. Groth
- 1868–1868: Christian Albrigt Jakhelln
- 1869–1870: Jens Cornelius Koch
- 1871–1871: Carl Jakhelln
- 1871–1872: Vilhelm Bernhard Jentoft
- 1872–1872: Ole M. Groth
- 1872–1875: Christian H. Mathiesen
- 1875–1877: Rasmus Theisen
- 1878–1879: Jens Cornelius Koch
- 1879–1879: Rasmus Theisen
- 1880–1881: Jens Cornelius Koch
- 1881–1882: Reinholdt Gram Breien
- 1883–1884: Otto Koch
- 1884–1885: Reinholdt Gram Breien
- 1885–1886: Otto Koch
- 1886–1887: Jakob Hansen
- 1887–1887: Jacob Olsen Vig
- 1887–1889: Rasmus Schjølberg
- 1890–1891: Thor Grøner
- 1891–1892: Christian Albrigt Jakhelln
- 1892–1893: Rasmus Schjølberg
- 1893–1894: Otto Koch
- 1894–1895: Rasmus Schjølberg
- 1895–1895: Otto Koch
- 1895–1896: Bertrand Gundersen
- 1896–1897: Rasmus Schjølberg
- 1897–1898: Bertrand Gundersen
- 1898–1899: Rasmus Schjølberg
- 1899–1900: Christian Jakhelln
- 1901–1902: Haakon Evjenth
- 1902–1903: Christian Jakhelln
- 1903–1903: Rasmus Schjølberg
- 1903–1904: Oskar Thue
- 1905–1907: Arnt Angell
- 1908–1910: Christian Jakhelln
- 1911–1912: Johan Lund
- 1913–1913: Martin Christoffersen
- 1914–1915: Ole Kristian Pedersen Bakken
- 1916–1917: Haakon Evjenth
- 1917–1918: Christian Jakhelln
- 1918–1919: Ole Kristian Pedersen Bakken
- 1919–1922: Christian Jakhelln
- 1923–1925: Ove Christian O. Owe
- 1926–1928: Haakon Evjenth
- 1929–1931: Johannes Høyer (H)
- 1932–1934: Haakon Koch (H)
- 1935–1937: Magnus Fische (H)
- 1938–1940: Haakon Koch (H)
- 1941–1943: Peder Johannes Seglem (NS)
- 1943–1945: Hans Kristensen (NS)
- 1945–1945: Haakon Koch (H)
- 1946–1948: Leif Aune
- 1948–1949: Morten Olsen
- 1950–1961: Birger Hals (Ap)
- 1962–1967: Olav Hagen (Ap)
- 1968–1969: Birger Hals (Ap)
- 1970–1971: Henry Forsaa (Ap)
- 1972–1975: Olav Hagen (Ap)
- 1976–1978: Gunhild Støver (H)
- 1978–1983: Roar Nøstvik (H)
- 1984–1995: Per Pettersen (Ap)
- 1995–1999: Oddleif Olavsen (H)
- 1999–2011: Odd-Tore Fygle (Ap)
- 2011–2015: Ole-Henrik Hjartøy (H)
- 2015–2023: Ida Maria Pinnerød (Ap)
- 2023–present: Odd Emil Ingebrigtsen (H)

== Military ==
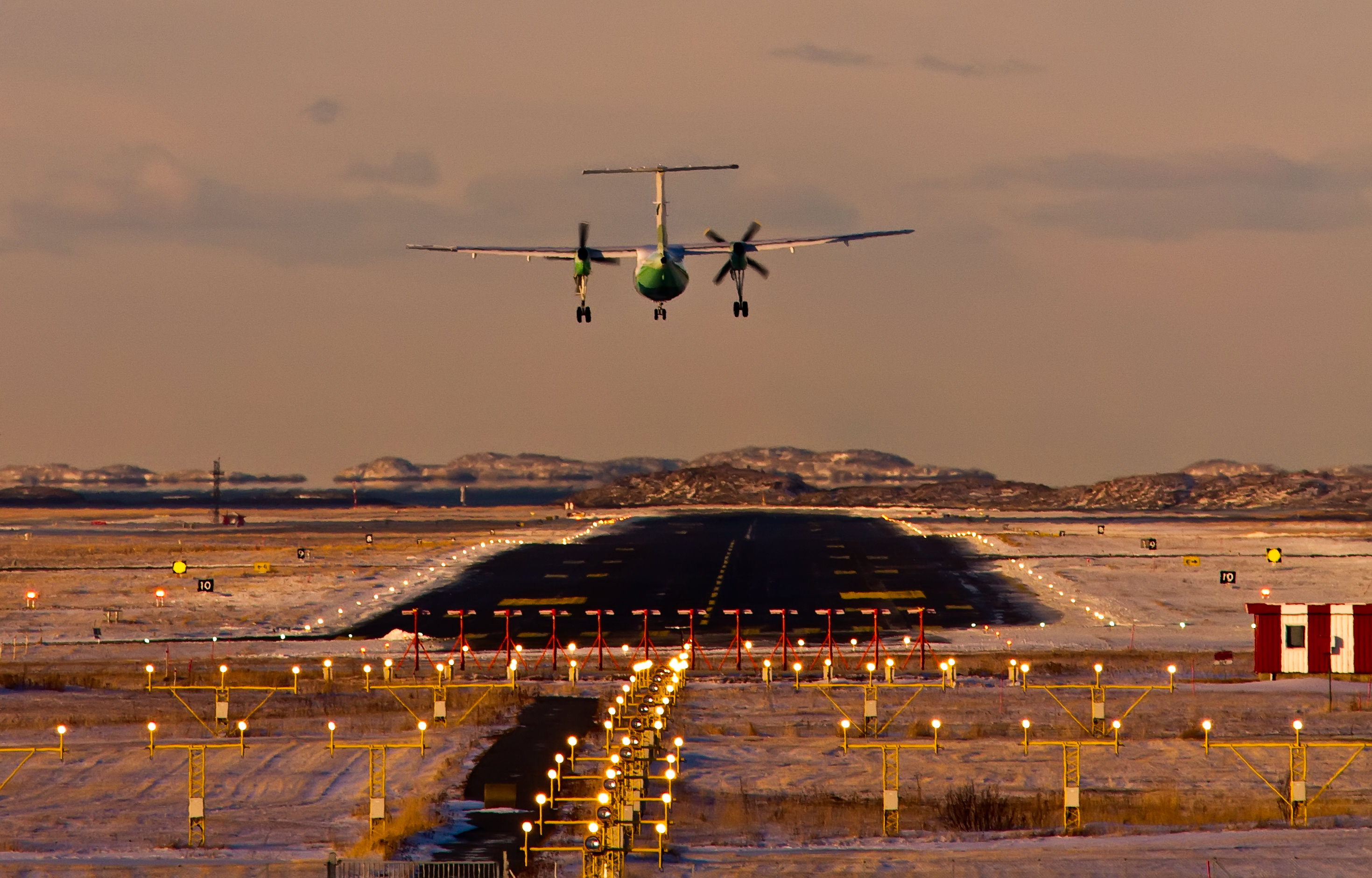
Widerøe Dash 8 landing at Bodø

Bodø has a long history with the Norwegian Armed Forces, and especially the Royal Norwegian Air Force (RNoAF). The Norwegian Armed Forces Joint Operational Headquarters are located at Reitan, east of Bodø. Parts of NATO air forces attending the annual Cold Response are stationed at Bodø Main Air Station. Bodø MAS was a major Norwegian military air base, housing two-thirds of Norway's F-16 fighter force and two of RNoAFs SAR Sea Kings. In January 2022, the F-16s were retired from service, significantly reducing the importance of Bodø as an air station. Bodin Leir located near the air station was an RNoAF recruit school including Norwegian Advanced Surface to Air Missile System personnel and a national response unit. The base was central during the Cold War due to its strategic location and proximity to the Soviet Union. It would have been vital in the build-up of NATO air and land forces to defend Norway, and thus the entire northern flank of NATO, in a war with the Warsaw Pact. It could also have been used as a forward base for American bombers. Now Bodin Leir is a camp to house military personnel for The Norwegian Joint Headquarters and Bodø Main Air Station.

Bodø has a street named General Fleischer's Gate in honour of Carl Gustav Fleischer.

Bodø received international attention during the U-2 Crisis in May 1960, when it became known that the American U-2 pilot Gary Powers had been shot down over the Soviet Union on his way from Pakistan to Bodø.

== Transportation ==
Bodø Railway station is the northern terminal of the Nordland Line railway.

The city is also served by Bodø Airport.

== Culture ==
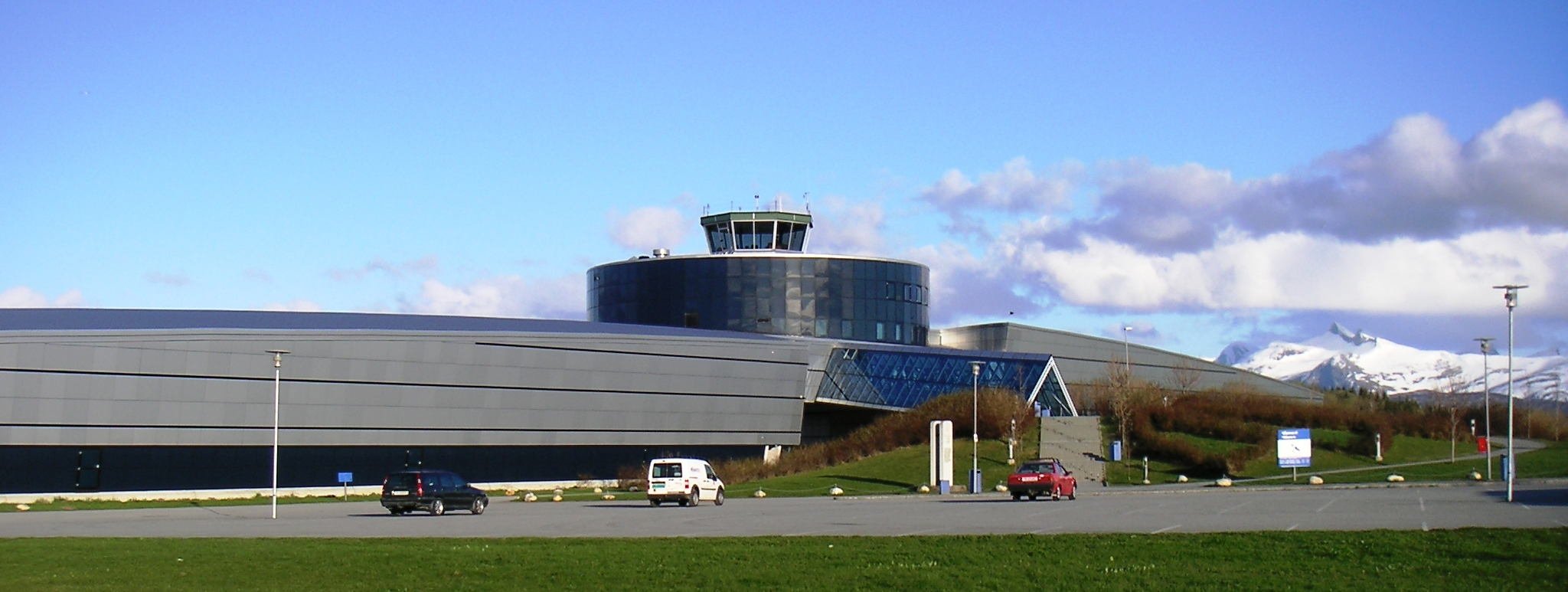
Norwegian Aviation Museum

Bodø's local newspapers are the Avisa Nordland and the online newspaper BodøNu.

The Norwegian Aviation Museum and the Nordland Museum are located in Bodø. The Nordland Museum (Nordlandsmuseet) consists of 18 smaller museums, which are located in different cities in the Nordland region. The main Nordland Museum institution is the Bodø City Museum, where the museum administration has its headquarters. The Bodø City Museum has four permanent exhibitions: The Lofoten Fisheries, a Sami exhibit, a Viking treasure, and an exhibition about Bodø's history from 1816 to 2000. In addition, the most recent smaller institution to open as part of the Nordland Museum was the Norwegian Jekt Trade Museum] It opened in 2019, and is located just outside of the city centre.

The Bodø Cathedral was built in 1956, representing post-war architecture, whereas the Bodin Church just outside the city centre dates from the 13th century, representing a typical medieval stone church.

The new cultural centre "Stormen" (the storm) was opened in 2014. It contains a library, a concert hall and theatre. The building was designed by Daniel Rosbottom and David Howarth from London-based DRDH Architects. The official art projects in Stormen were curated by KORO.

Bodø is host to the cultural festivals Nordland Musikkfestuke, Parkenfestivalen and the Opptur festival every summer, as well as the free and volunteer-based Bodø Hardcore Festival in early winter. The avant-garde and experimental contemporary music festival Nødutgangfestivalen has been held annually since 2006.

Fram Kino was the first cinema in Norway, opening in 1908.

=== Churches ===
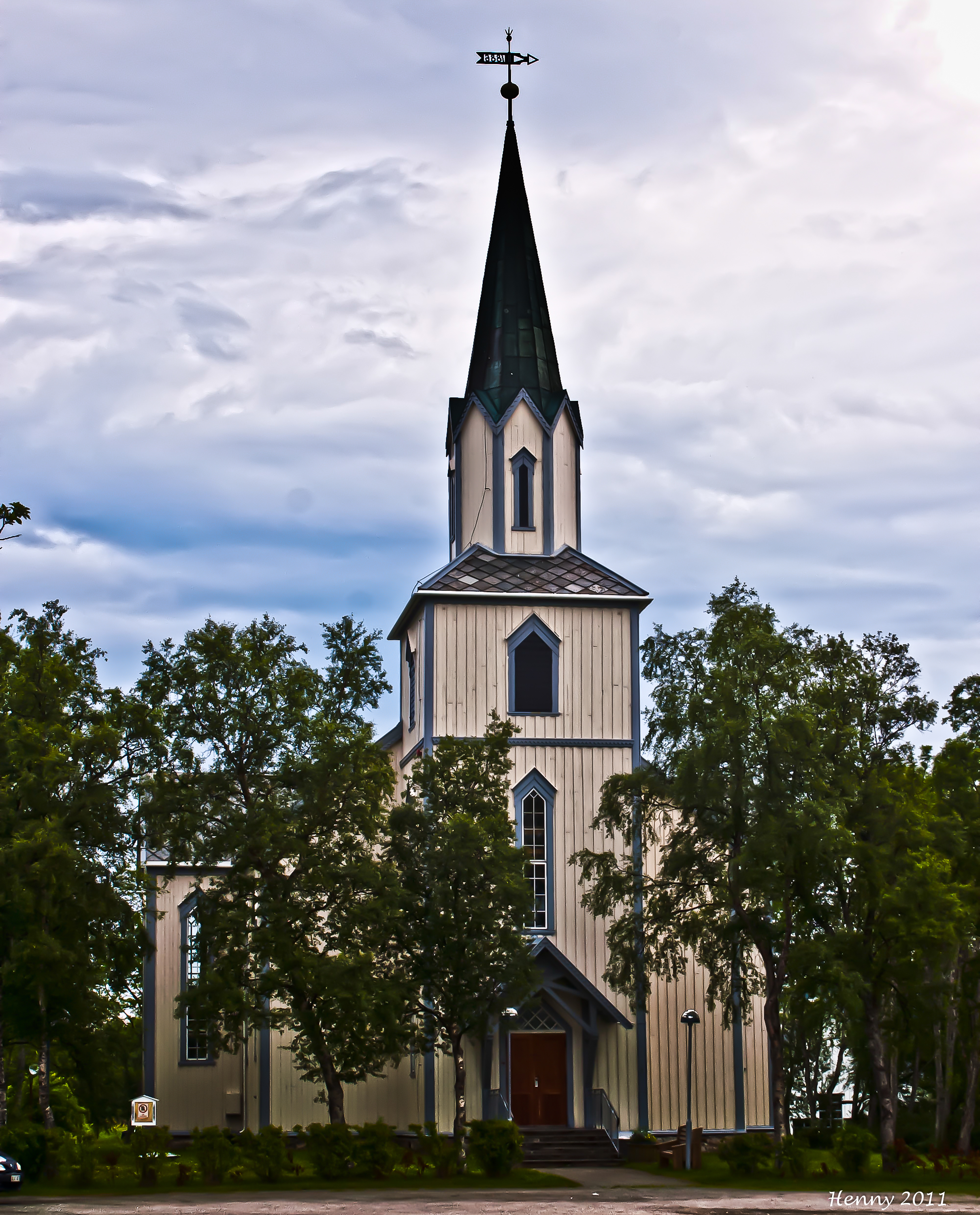
Saltstraumen kyrkje, 2011

The Church of Norway has six parishes (sokn) within Bodø Municipality. It is part of the Bodø domprosti (arch-deanery) in the Diocese of Sør-Hålogaland.

Churches in Bodø Municipality
| Parish (sokn) | Church name | Location | Year built |
|---|---|---|---|
| Bodin | Bodin Church | Bodø | 1240 |
| Bodin | Helligvær Church | Helligvær | 1899 |
| Bodin | Landegode Church | Fenes | 1920 |
| Bodø Domkirke | Bodø Cathedral | Bodø | 1956 |
| Innstranden | Hunstad Church | Bodø | 2013 |
| Kjerringøy og Rønvik | Kjerringøy Church | Kjerringøy | 1883 |
| Kjerringøy og Rønvik | Rønvik Church | Bodø | 1997 |
| Misvær og Skjerstad | Misvær Church | Misvær | 1912 |
| Misvær og Skjerstad | Skjerstad Church | Skjerstad | 1959 |
| Saltstraumen | Saltstraumen Church | Knaplundsøya | 1886 |
| Saltstraumen | Tverlandet Church | Løding | 1983 |
