= Grytøy Lighthouse =

Coastal lighthouse in Norway

Grytøy Lighthouse Grytøy fyrstasjon
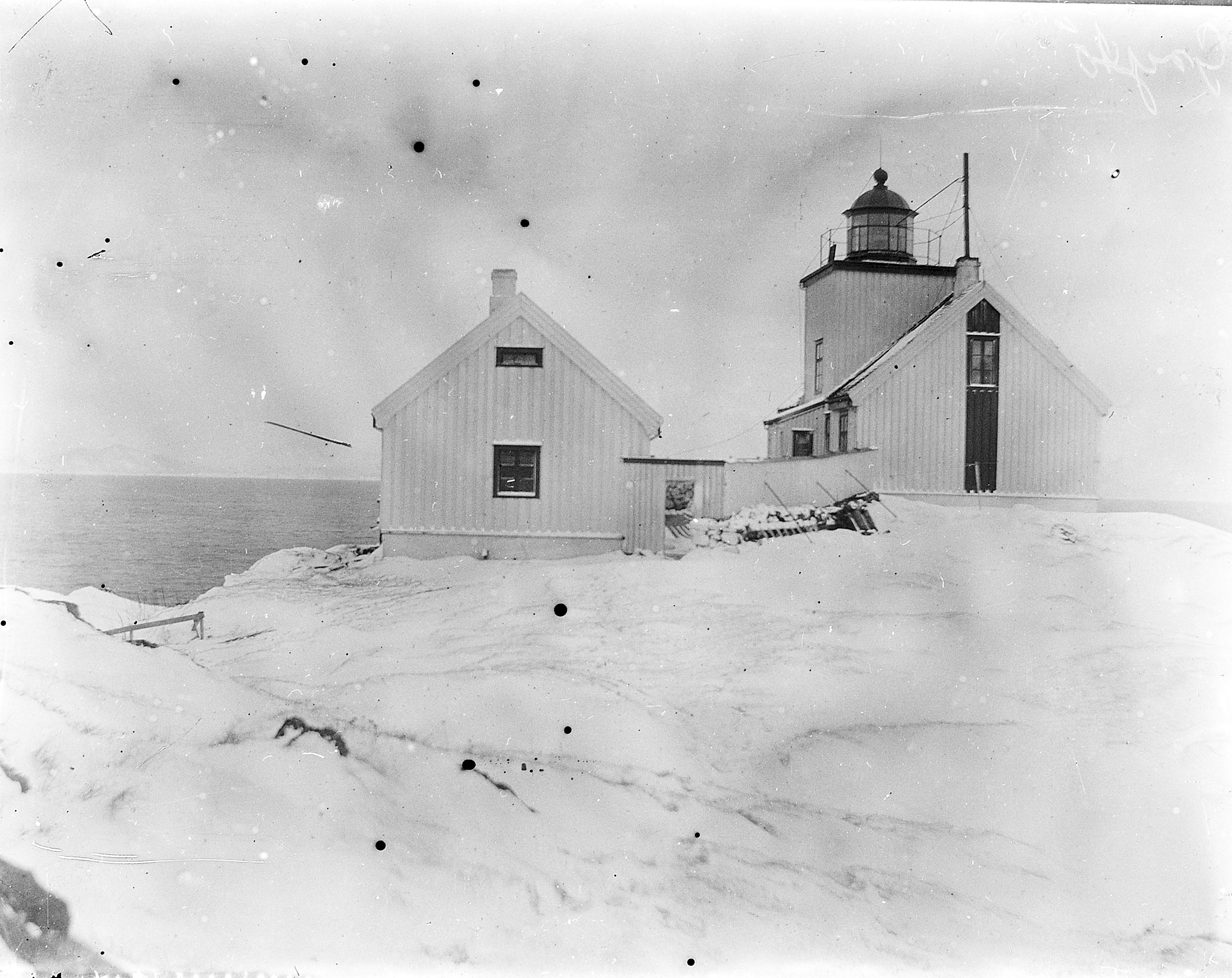
- View of the lighthouse
- Location of the lighthouse
- Location: Nordland, Norway
- Coordinates: 67°23′23″N 13°50′45″E

Tower
- Constructed: 1865
- Construction: concrete
- Automated: 1959
- Height: 10.5 metres (34 ft)
- Shape: cylindrical

Light
- First lit: 1959
- Focal height: 34.3 metres (113 ft)
- Range: Red: 5.9 nmi (10.9 km; 6.8 mi) Green: 5.5 nmi (10.2 km; 6.3 mi) White: 8 nmi (15 km; 9.2 mi)
- Characteristic: Fl(2) WR 10s
- Norway no.: 701000

Grytøy Lighthouse (Norwegian: Grytøy fyr) is a coastal lighthouse in Bodø Municipality in Nordland county, Norway. It is located in the Vestfjorden in the Helligvær islands, about 25 kilometres (16 mi) northwest of the town of Bodø.

The current light sits atop a 10.5-metre (34 ft) tall concrete tower. The light sits 34.3 metres (113 ft) above sea level. It has two flashes every 10 seconds, the color that flashes is white or red depending on direction from which it is seen. The light can be seen for up to 8 nautical miles (15 km; 9.2 mi).

== History ==
The original lighthouse was built in 1865. It was a square light tower attached to the front of a two-story keeper's house. It was located near the current lighthouse. That lighthouse was closed and demolished in 1959 and replaced with an automated light tower nearby.

== See also ==
- Lighthouses in Norway
- List of lighthouses in Norway
