= Soløyvatnet =

Lake in Bodø, Norway

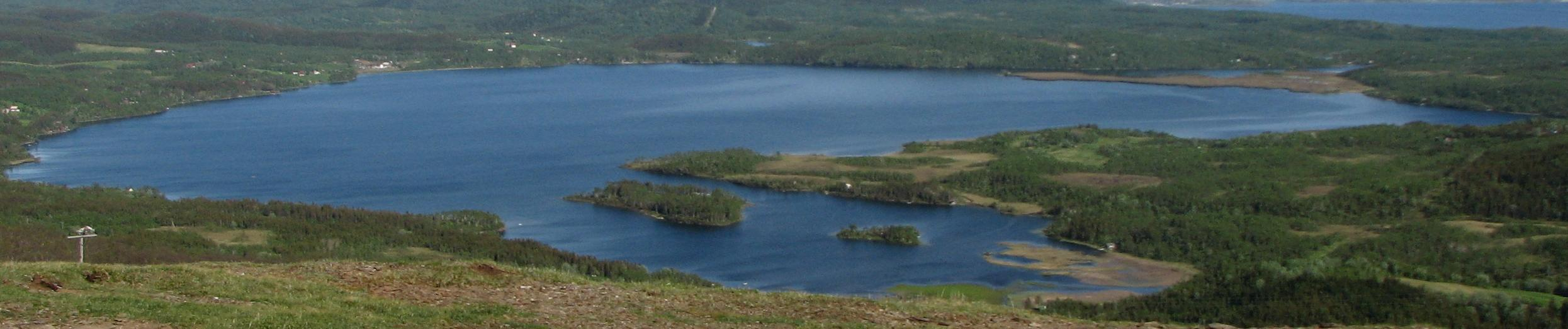
- View of the lake (2007)
- Interactive map of the lake
- Location: Bodø Municipality, Nordland
- Coordinates: 67.3147°N 14.5899°E
- Basin countries: Norway
- Max. length: 3.6 kilometres (2.2 mi)
- Max. width: 2.5 kilometres (1.6 mi)
- Surface area: 4.85 km^{2} (1.87 sq mi)
- Shore length^{1}: 17 kilometres (11 mi)
- Surface elevation: 49 metres (161 ft)
- References: NVE
- ^{1} Shore length is not a well-defined measure.

Soløyvatnet is a lake that lies in Bodø Municipality in Nordland county, Norway. The 4.85-square-kilometre (1.87 sq mi) lake is located about 5 kilometres (3.1 mi) northeast of the town of Bodø.

== See also ==
- List of lakes in Norway
- Geography of Norway
