= Tverlandet Church =

Church in Nordland, Norway

- Tverlandet kirke
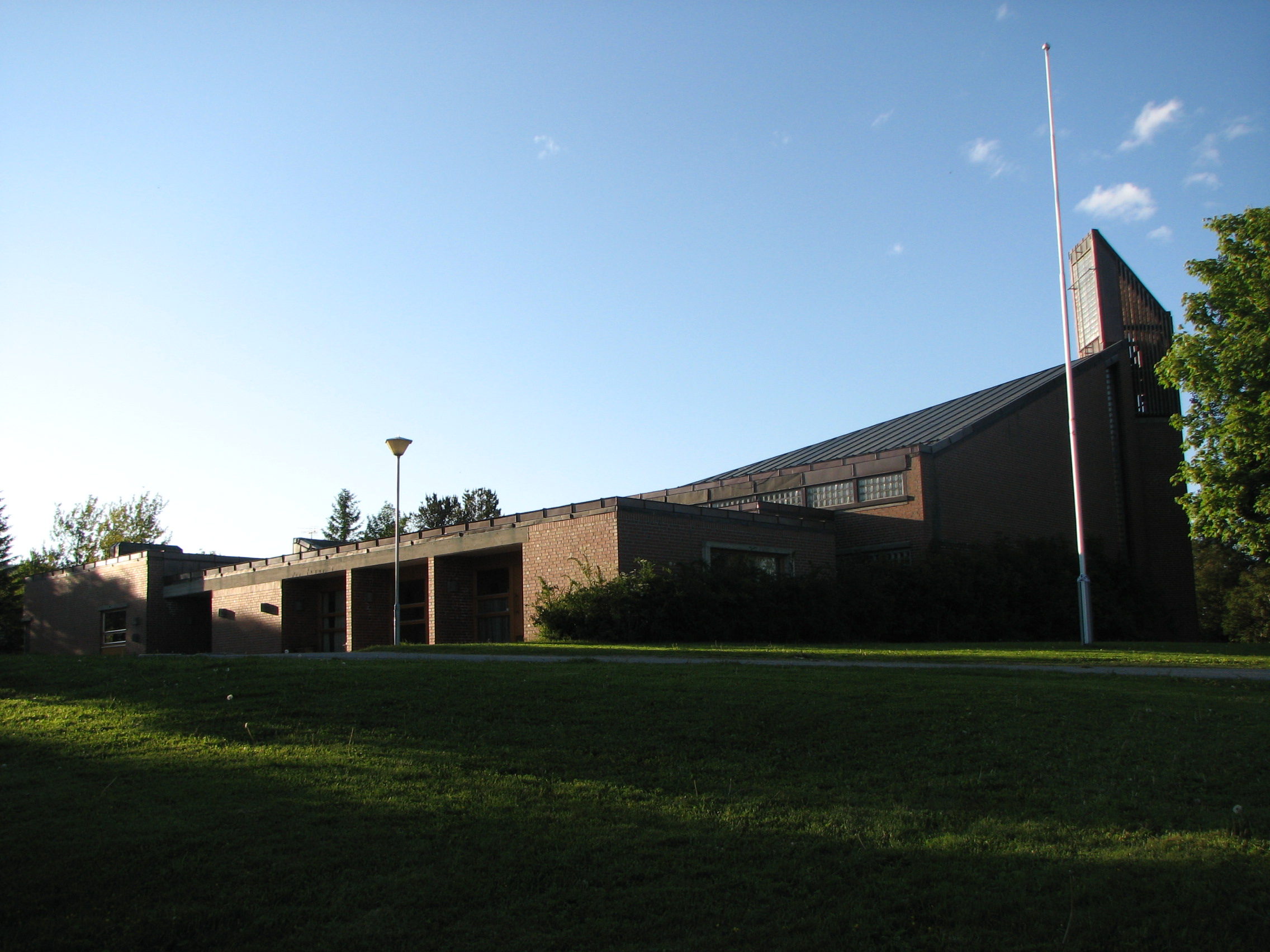
- View of the church
- Tverlandet Church
- 67.2971305°N 14.736539°E
- Location: Bodø Municipality, Nordland
- Country: Norway
- Denomination: Church of Norway
- Churchmanship: Evangelical Lutheran

History
- Status: Parish church
- Founded: 1983
- Consecrated: 6 November 1983

Architecture
- Functional status: Active
- Architect: Reidar Berg
- Architectural type: Fan-shaped
- Completed: 1983 (43 years ago)

Specifications
- Capacity: 320
- Materials: Brick

Administration
- Diocese: Sør-Hålogaland
- Deanery: Bodø domprosti
- Parish: Saltstraumen

Tverlandet Church (Norwegian: Tverlandet kirke) is a parish church of the Church of Norway in Bodø Municipality in Nordland county, Norway. It is located in the village of Løding. It is one of the two churches for the Saltstraumen parish which is part of the Bodø domprosti (deanery) in the Diocese of Sør-Hålogaland. The modern, brick church was built in a fan-shaped style in 1983 using plans drawn up by the architect Reidar Berg. The church seats about 320 people. The church was consecrated on 6 November 1983.

== See also ==
- List of churches in Sør-Hålogaland
