= Valnesvatnet =

Lake in Bodø, Norway

- Interactive map of the lake
- Location: Bodø Municipality, Nordland
- Coordinates: 67.1524°N 14.4583°E
- Basin countries: Norway
- Max. length: 4.5 kilometres (2.8 mi)
- Max. width: 2 kilometres (1.2 mi)
- Surface area: 4.91 km^{2} (1.90 sq mi)
- Shore length^{1}: 20.66 kilometres (12.84 mi)
- Surface elevation: 121 metres (397 ft)
- References: NVE
- ^{1} Shore length is not a well-defined measure.

Valnesvatnet is a lake that lies in Bodø Municipality in Nordland county, Norway. The 4.91-square-kilometre (1.90 sq mi) lake lies along the Norwegian County Road 17 about 1 kilometre (0.62 mi) north of the border with Gildeskål Municipality, just northeast of the village of Nygårdsjøen. The water in the lake flows out over the Valnesfossen waterfall on its way to the sea.

== See also ==
- List of lakes in Norway
- Geography of Norway
