= Fjærvatnet =

Lake in Bodø, Norway

Fjærvatnet Indre Fjærvatn
- Interactive map of the lake
- Location: Bodø Municipality, Nordland
- Coordinates: 67.4921°N 14.7707°E
- Basin countries: Norway
- Max. length: 3.6 kilometres (2.2 mi)
- Max. width: 1.1 kilometres (0.68 mi)
- Surface area: 2.48 km^{2} (0.96 sq mi)
- Shore length^{1}: 12.41 kilometres (7.71 mi)
- Surface elevation: 6 metres (20 ft)
- References: NVE
- ^{1} Shore length is not a well-defined measure.

Fjærvatnet or Indre Fjærvatn is a lake that lies in Bodø Municipality in Nordland county, Norway. The 2.48-square-kilometre (0.96 sq mi) lake is located about 3 kilometres (1.9 mi) south of the village of Kjerringøy, near the village of Fjære.

== See also ==
- List of lakes in Norway
- Geography of Norway
