= Sjunkhatten National Park =

National park in Norway

- IUCN category II (national park)
- Interactive map of Sjunkhatten National Park
- Location: Bodø, Fauske, and Sørfold in Nordland, Norway
- Nearest city: Bodø
- Coordinates: 67.4°N 15°E
- Area: 417.5 km^{2} (161.2 sq mi)
- Established: 5 February 2010
- Governing body: Directorate for Nature Management

Sjunkhatten National Park (Norwegian: Sjunkhatten nasjonalpark) was established in 2010 in Nordland county, Norway. The park consists of a 417.5-square-kilometre (161.2 sq mi) continuously protected area, including 39.8-square-kilometre (15.4 sq mi) sea area in Bodø Municipality, Fauske Municipality, and Sørfold Municipality. The park is located on a peninsula between the Sørfolda fjord and Saltfjorden, including glacier-formed landscape, caves and water systems, fjords, the large lake Heggmovatnet, rare animal species, and cultural heritage.

== History and establishment ==
The idea to protect the peninsula now constituting Sjunkhatten National Park was first put forward by the Ministry of the Environment in 2007 as part of Norway's revised national parks strategy. After extensive local and regional consultations—including four public meetings and input from over 570 stakeholders—the proposal was refined through 2008 and submitted to the Directorate for Nature Management in February 2008. Following final ministerial approval in late 2009, the park was formally established by royal resolution on 5 February 2010, reflecting both national conservation targets and international commitments under IUCN and the Convention on Biological Diversity.

== Geography and area ==
Sjunkhatten National Park covers a continuously protected area of 417.5 km^{2}—of which 39.8 km^{2} is marine—spread across Bodø, Fauske and Sørfold municipalities in Nordland county. The landscape comprises deeply incised fjords (Sørfolda and Saltfjorden), glacier‑scoured mountains with both jagged peaks and rounded summits, extensive karst and cave systems, and the large freshwater lake Heggmovatnet. The park's bedrock and topography reflect its Pleistocene glaciation, and it remains one of North Norway's largest nearly untouched mountain‑fjord complexes.

== Flora and fauna ==
Despite its high‑latitude setting, the park supports considerable biological diversity. Field inventories have recorded fifteen red‑listed species—including the Antarctic lichen Fuscopannaria ignobilis, large birds of prey such as white-tailed eagle and gyrfalcon, and mammals such as Eurasian lynx—reflecting a range of habitats from boreal birch forest to alpine tundra. Rich karst rock outcrops provide niches for specialised bryophytes and invertebrates, while coastal waters host spawning grounds for cod and other fish.

== Cultural heritage ==
Archaeological evidence indicates human presence since the early Mesolithic (8 000–9 000 years ago), with Stone Age-dwelling sites clustered along sheltered fjord inlets. Later, Sámi reindeer herders established seasonal camps in the inner valleys, and the landscape retains traces of traditional sheep grazing, berry gathering and beekeeping. Historic timber plantings and century‑old farmsteads survive on the lower slopes, indicating a long history of sustainable rural use.

== Land use and recreation ==
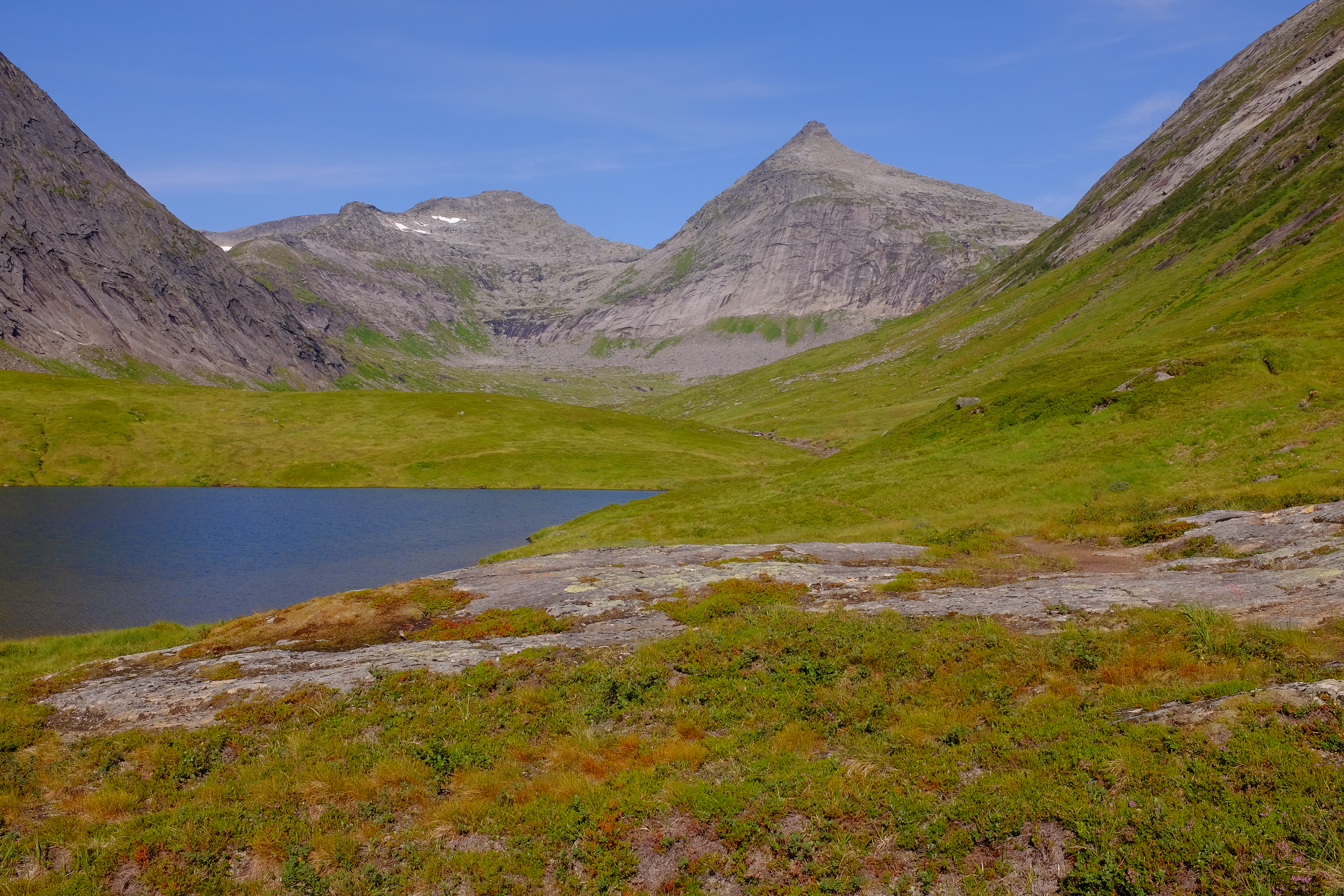
Midtiskartinden summit seen from Midtiskaret gorge

Traditional land use continues alongside low‑intensity tourism. In 2007 some 4363 sheep and 328 cattle grazed the summer pastures, while local farms practise beekeeping and small‑scale raspberry cultivation. Recreational activities such as boating through fjords, hiking on marked and unmarked trails, and cross‑country skiing are largely unstructured, though guided boat tours and nature interpretation programmes are developing. As of 2009, about 40 private cabins were within park boundaries, most dating from the mid‑20th century and maintained under strict rules.

== Management and regulation ==
The park is managed by the Nordland County Governor in partnership with municipal and Sámi representatives via an advisory board. A draft management plan was slated for completion by June 2010; it prescribes permitted activities such as grazing, firewood collection for existing cabins, cave research, and limited motor‑vehicle access on designated routes. All new constructions and major interventions require ministerial consent, ensuring that conservation objectives—and the park's role in a contiguous network of protected areas—remain paramount.
