= Johannes Høyer =

Norwegian judge and politician

- Born: 19 January 1883; Arendal, Norway
- Died: 4 October 1960 (aged 77)
- Occupations: Jurist; Politician

Johannes Høyer (19 January 1883 – 4 October 1960) was a Norwegian judge and politician.

He was born in Arendal to priest Hans Anton Høyer and Jørgine Marianne Petersen. He graduated as cand.jur. in 1906. He was elected representative to the Storting for the period 1925–1927, for the Conservative Party. He served as mayor of Bodø Municipality from 1928 to 1931. From 1928 to 1939 he was a public prosecutor (Norwegian: statsadvokat) of Nordland lagsogn. In 1939 he was appointed as a district stipendiary magistrate (Norwegian: sorenskriver) of Hedmark.

Høyer died on 4 October 1960, at the age of 77.
