= Løpsmarka =

Village in Bodø Municipality, Norway

- Village
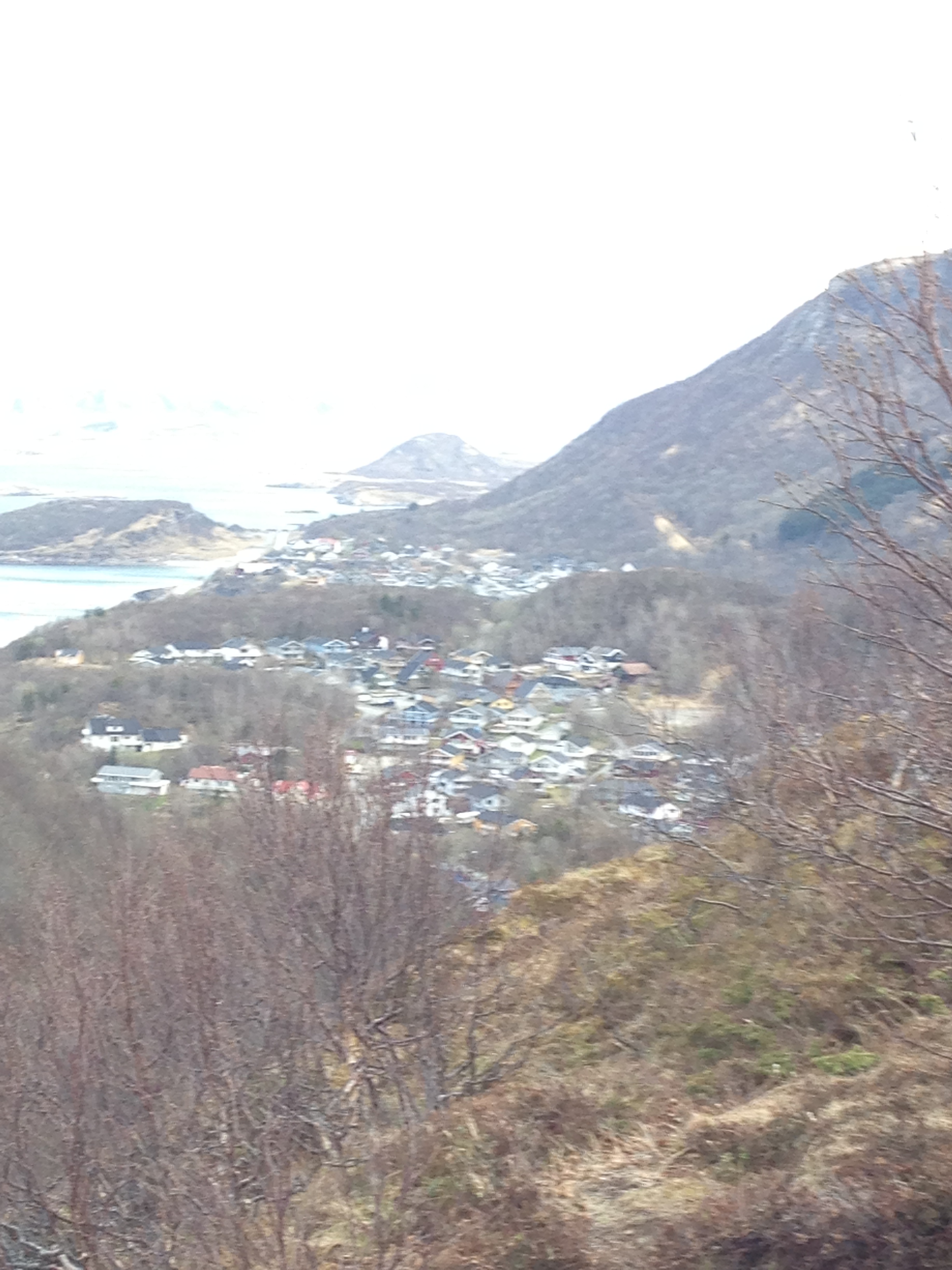
- View of the village
- Interactive map of Løpsmarka
- Location within Nordland Location within Norway
- Coordinates: 67.3138°N 14.4487°E
- Country: Norway
- Region: Northern Norway
- County: Nordland
- District: Salten
- Municipality: Bodø Municipality

Area
  - Total: 0.67 km^{2} (0.26 sq mi)
- Elevation: 9 m (30 ft)

Population (2023)
  - Total: 2,302
  - Density: 3,436/km^{2} (8,900/sq mi)
- Time zone: UTC+01:00 (CET)
  - Summer (DST): UTC+02:00 (CEST)
- Post Code: 8015 Bodø

Løpsmarka is a village in Bodø Municipality in Nordland county, Norway. It is located about 4 kilometres (2.5 mi) north of the town of Bodø. The 0.67-square-kilometre (170-acre) village has a population (2023) of 2,302 and a population density of 3,436 inhabitants per square kilometre (8,900/sq mi).
