= Fenes, Nordland =

Village in Bodø Municipality, Norway

Fenes
- Village
- Interactive map of Fenes
- Location within Nordland Location within Norway
- Coordinates: 67.3834°N 14.2546°E
- Country: Norway
- Region: Northern Norway
- County: Nordland
- District: Salten
- Municipality: Bodø Municipality
- Elevation: 14 m (46 ft)
- Time zone: UTC+01:00 (CET)
  - Summer (DST): UTC+02:00 (CEST)
- Post Code: 8020 Bodø

Fenes is a village in Bodø Municipality in Nordland county, Norway. It is located on the island of Landegode about 13 kilometres (8.1 mi) northwest of the town of Bodø. The village is located on the south side of the island, where the majority of the island residents live. It is the location of Landegode Church.
