= Helligvær =

Island in Nordland, Norway

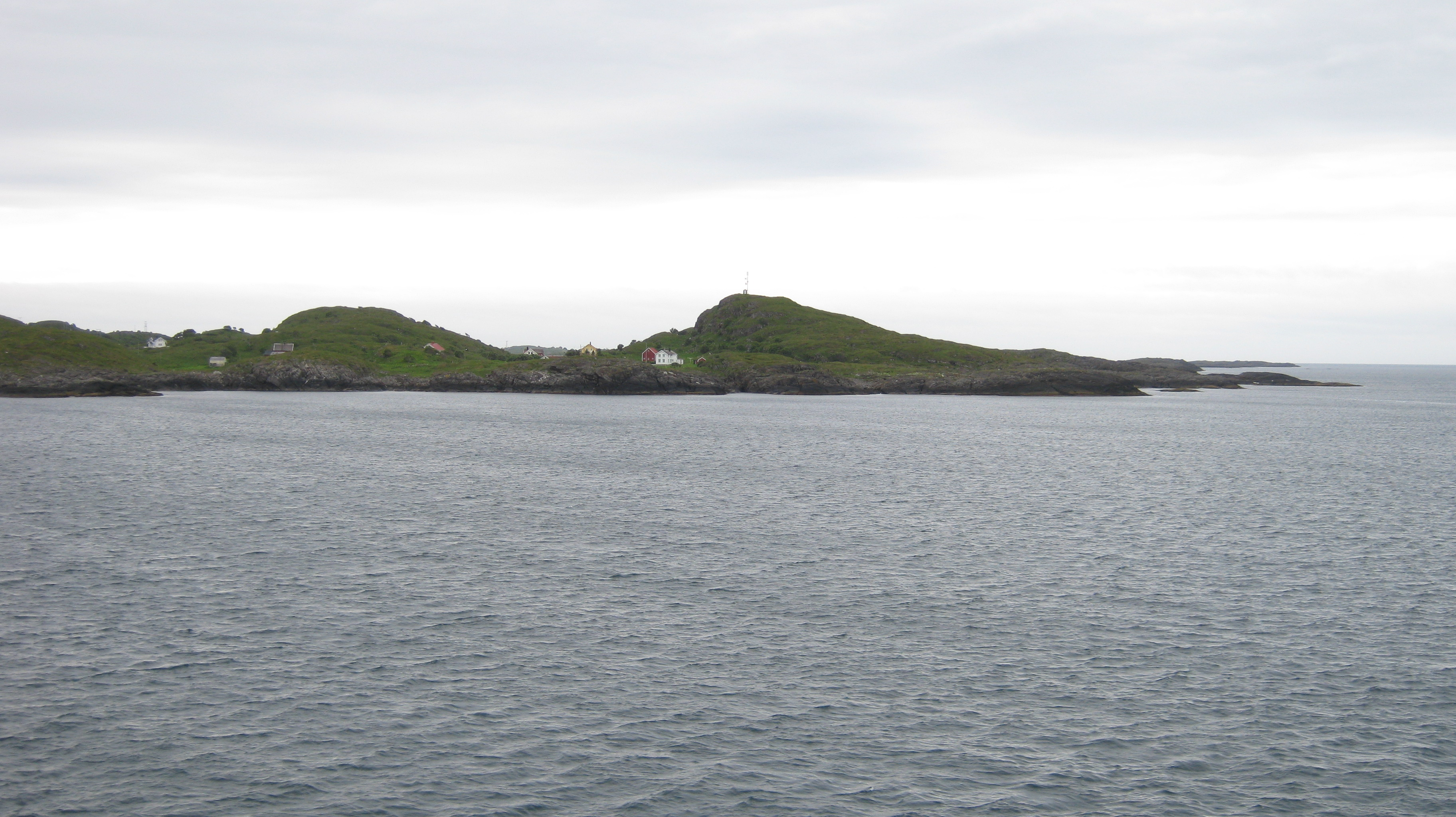
- Interactive map of Helligvær

Geography
- Location: Nordland, Norway
- Coordinates: 67.4420°N 13.8953°E
- Highest elevation: 50 m (160 ft)
- Highest point: Størrihaugen

Administration
- Norway
- County: Nordland
- Municipality: Bodø Municipality

Demographics
- Population: 106 (2017)

Helligvær is an island group in the Vestfjorden in Bodø Municipality in Nordland county, Norway. The islands are located about 25 kilometres (16 mi) northwest of the town of Bodø. The Bliksvær islands are about 12 kilometres (7.5 mi) to the south, Landegode island is 15 kilometres (9.3 mi) to the east, and the islands of Røstlandet and Værøya are about 60 kilometres (37 mi) to the west.

There are about 365 islands, islets, and skerries in the group. They are all low and grassy with no trees. There are five inhabited islands in the group: Sørvær (most populous), Brønnøya, Storsørøya, Vetterøya, and Vokkøya (the largest). The islanders live in small fishing villages around the island group. There were about 106 inhabitants in 2017. Helligvær Church is located on the island of Storsørøya and Grytøy Lighthouse is located on the island of Grytøy in the southern part of the island group.

== See also ==
- List of islands of Norway
