= Helligvær Church =

Church in Nordland, Norway

- Helligvær kirke
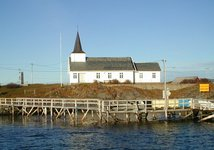
- View of the church (from: Kirken.no)
- Helligvær Church
- 67.4229789°N 13.9322076°E
- Location: Bodø Municipality, Nordland
- Country: Norway
- Denomination: Church of Norway
- Churchmanship: Evangelical Lutheran

History
- Status: Chapel
- Founded: 1899
- Consecrated: 1908

Architecture
- Functional status: Active
- Architectural type: Long church
- Completed: 1899 (127 years ago)

Specifications
- Capacity: 100
- Materials: Wood

Administration
- Diocese: Sør-Hålogaland
- Deanery: Bodø domprosti
- Parish: Bodin
- Norwegian Cultural Heritage Site
- Type: Church
- Status: Not protected
- ID: 84538

Helligvær Church (Norwegian: Helligvær kirke) is a chapel of the Church of Norway in Bodø Municipality in Nordland county, Norway. It is located on the small island of Store Sørøya in the Helligvær islands in the Vestfjorden west of the town of Bodø. It is an annex chapel for the Bodin parish which is part of the Bodø domprosti (deanery) in the Diocese of Sør-Hålogaland. The small, white, wooden chapel was built in a long church style in 1899. The chapel seats about 100 people. It was originally a small bedehus (meeting house), but in 1908 it was consecrated as an official chapel.

== See also ==
- List of churches in Sør-Hålogaland
