= Bliksvær =

Island in Nordland, Norway

Bliksvær Briksvær
- Interactive map of Bliksvær; Briksvær

Geography
- Location: Nordland, Norway
- Coordinates: 67.2795°N 13.8797°E
- Highest elevation: 89 m (292 ft)

Administration
- Norway
- County: Nordland
- Municipality: Bodø Municipality

Demographics
- Population: 5 (2017)

Ramsar Wetland
- Official name: Bliksvaer
- Designated: 6 August 2002
- Reference no.: 1187

Bliksvær or Briksvær is an island group in the Vestfjorden in Bodø Municipality in Nordland county, Norway. The islands are located about 15 kilometres (9.3 mi) west of the town of Bodø. The Helligvær islands are about 12 kilometres (7.5 mi) to the north, Landegode island is 13 kilometres (8.1 mi) to the northeast, and the islands of Røstlandet and Værøya around about 75 kilometres (47 mi) to the west.

There are about 60 islands and islets in the Bliksvær group. They are mostly low and grassy, though trees become taller and more plentiful on the more sheltered eastern side of the group. The only inhabited island is Bliksvær island. There were 5 inhabitants in 2017.

Due to the rich bird life in the area, about 101,430 decares (39.16 mi^{2}) of the island group is protected as a nature reserve. Most of the nature reserve is not land, but ocean to protect the habitat of the sea birds and seals.

The island group is served by the Bodø-Ytre Gildeskål fast passenger boat route.

== See also ==
- List of islands of Norway
