= Landegode Church =

Church in Nordland, Norway

- Landegode kirke
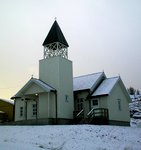
- View of the church (from: kirken.no)
- Landegode Church
- 67.3835768°N 14.25404325°E
- Location: Bodø Municipality, Nordland
- Country: Norway
- Denomination: Church of Norway
- Churchmanship: Evangelical Lutheran

History
- Status: Parish church
- Founded: 1920
- Consecrated: January 1997

Architecture
- Functional status: Active
- Architectural type: Long church
- Completed: 1920 (106 years ago)

Specifications
- Materials: Wood

Administration
- Diocese: Sør-Hålogaland
- Deanery: Bodø domprosti
- Parish: Bodin

Landegode Church (Norwegian: Landegode kirke) is a parish church of the Church of Norway in Bodø Municipality in Nordland county, Norway. It is located in the village of Fenes on the island of Landegode. It is one of the churches for the Bodin parish which is part of the Bodø domprosti (deanery) in the Diocese of Sør-Hålogaland. The white, wooden church was built in a long church style in 1920. It was built as a bedehus chapel in 1920 and in January 1997, it was consecrated by Øystein Ingar Larsen as an official church of the Church of Norway.

== See also ==
- List of churches in Sør-Hålogaland
