= Løding =

Village in Bodø Municipality, Norway

- Village
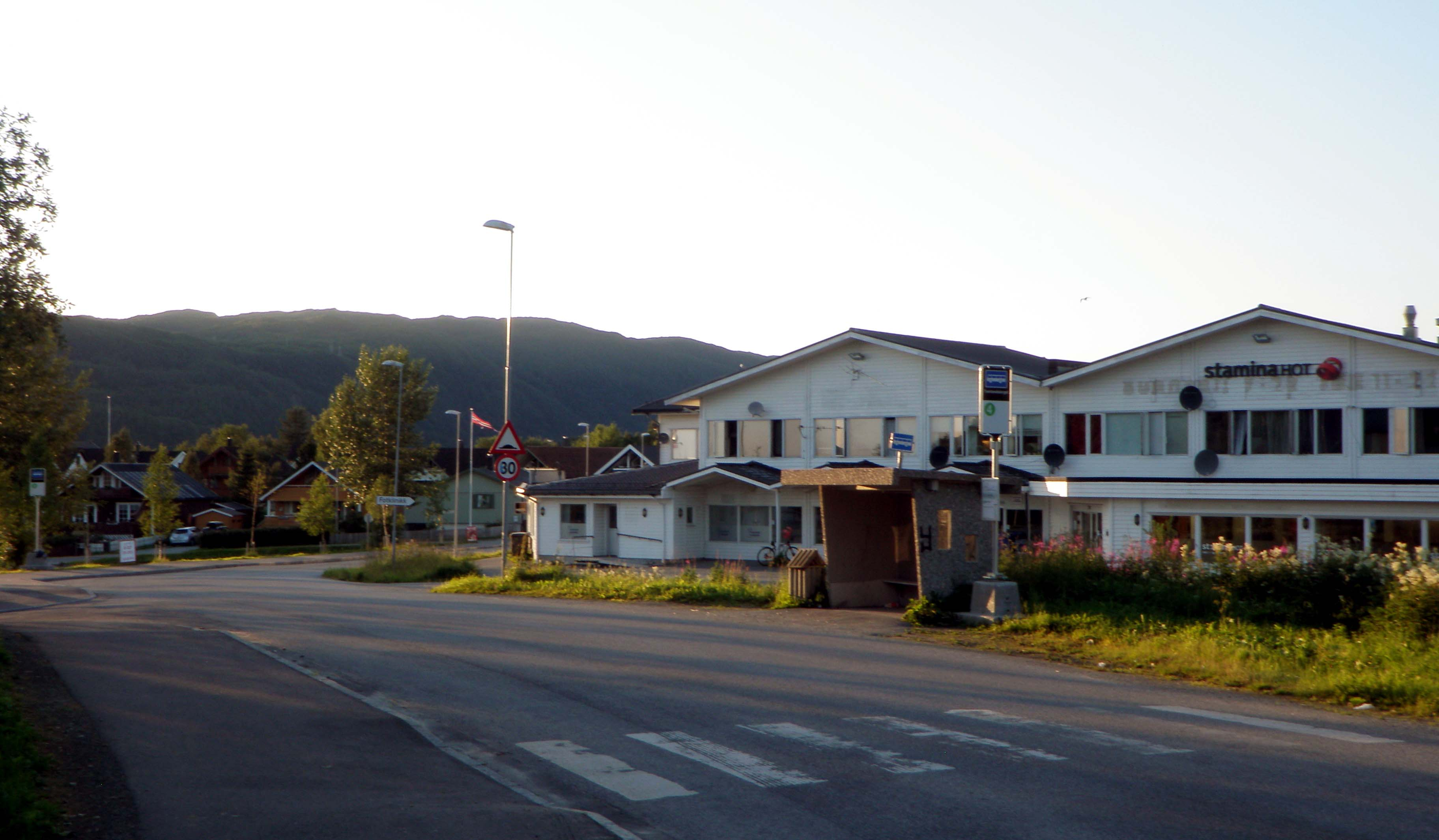
- View of the village
- Interactive map of Løding
- Location within Nordland Location within Norway
- Coordinates: 67.3006°N 14.7385°E
- Country: Norway
- Region: Northern Norway
- County: Nordland
- District: Salten
- Municipality: Bodø Municipality

Area
  - Total: 1.33 km^{2} (0.51 sq mi)
- Elevation: 20 m (66 ft)

Population (2023)
  - Total: 3,332
  - Density: 2,505/km^{2} (6,490/sq mi)
- Time zone: UTC+01:00 (CET)
  - Summer (DST): UTC+02:00 (CEST)
- Post Code: 8050 Tverlandet

Løding is a village in Bodø Municipality in Nordland county, Norway.

== Geography ==
The village is located about 17 kilometres (11 mi) east of the town of Bodø, and is connected to the town by the Tverlandet Bridge. The village is mostly referred to as Tverlandet, which also encompasses the areas Hopen, Vatne, Heggmoen, Mjønes, Vågan, Holand, Skålbunes, Elstad, Oddan, Allmenningen, Godøynes (Gaunes), and Naurstad, all of which lie around the village.

== Population ==
The 1.33-square-kilometre (330-acre) village has a population (2023) of 3,332 and a population density of 2,505 inhabitants per square kilometre (6,490/sq mi).

== Services ==
The village lies at the northern terminus of Norwegian County Road 17 and along the Nordland Line railway. The Tverlandet Church is located in Løding, and the local sports club is Tverlandet IL. In the centre of the village, there is a doctor's office, dentist office, and grocery stores, along with the country's first Nikita hair salon. There is a building material store and a specialist store within caravan and equipment. Within the village there is a retirement home, several kindergartens, and a school up and until ungdomsskole.

The lake Vatnvatnet lies north of the village.

== Notable residents ==
- Tore Johansen (b. 1977), a jazz artist.
- Marie Blokhus (b. 1982), an actress.
