= Håkon Evjenth =

Norwegian jurist, non-fiction writer, short-story writer and children's writer

- Born: 26 December 1894; Bodø, Norway
- Died: 10 June 1951 (aged 56)
- Occupations: jurist, non-fiction writer, short-story writer and children's writer
- Parent: Håkon Martin Evjenth

Håkon Evjenth (26 December 1894 – 10 June 1951) was a Norwegian jurist, non-fiction writer, short-story writer and children's writer. He is probably best remembered for his children's books.

== Personal life ==
Evjenth was born in Bodø to barrister and government minister Håkon Martin Evjenth and Martha Backer. He married schoolteacher Solveig Bjerve in 1923.

== Career ==
Evjenth graduated as cand.jur. in 1917. He started his professional career in Kristiania, was a barrister in Vardø from 1921 to 1925, and then in Bodø. He received a grant from Institute for Comparative Research in Human Culture for the years 1927–1930 for conducting research on the Sami culture, and lived four years in a turf hut at the Varanger Peninsula, along with his wife. He made his literary debut in 1927, with Finnmarks-jakter, and in 1928 he published the short story collection Folk under fot. His literary breakthrough was the children's book 3 på to og 2 på fire from 1935, which saw the sequels På to og fire i Suonjo from 1936 and Over kjølen i kano from 1937. Descriptions of the nature in Northern Norway, such as birds and animal life, dominate large parts of these books. In 1939 he wrote En fiskergutt i Sameland, set in the mid 19th century, where the Sami culture is a central element. In 1940 he wrote the sequel På langferd i grenseland. Falkefengeren from 1941 is set in the 17th century. These children's books were later reissued in Gyldendal Norsk Forlag's GGG book series for boys ("Gyldendals Gode Guttebøker").

== World War II ==
During the German occupation of Norway Evjenth took part in resistance activities. He was among a group of people in Bodø who tried to take some initiatives in 1940, and helped with the establishment of the Secret Intelligence Service wireline station Delta in 1941. He was arrested an held in the Falstad concentration camp from December 1941 to February 1942, and again from May to June 1943. He later focused on helping refugees and on news distribution. He was arrested on 5 September 1943, for being in possession of a radio. His wife was also arrested. They were both incarcerated at the Grini detention camp from January 1944 to March 1945.

His novel for young adults Krig i kvitt from 1945 treats the Battles of Narvik in 1940. It is based on diaries written by participants in the campaign. In 1945 he also wrote the book Mannen som reddet verden, about Winston Churchill.
