= Høyforsmoen =

Village in Nordland, Norway

- Village
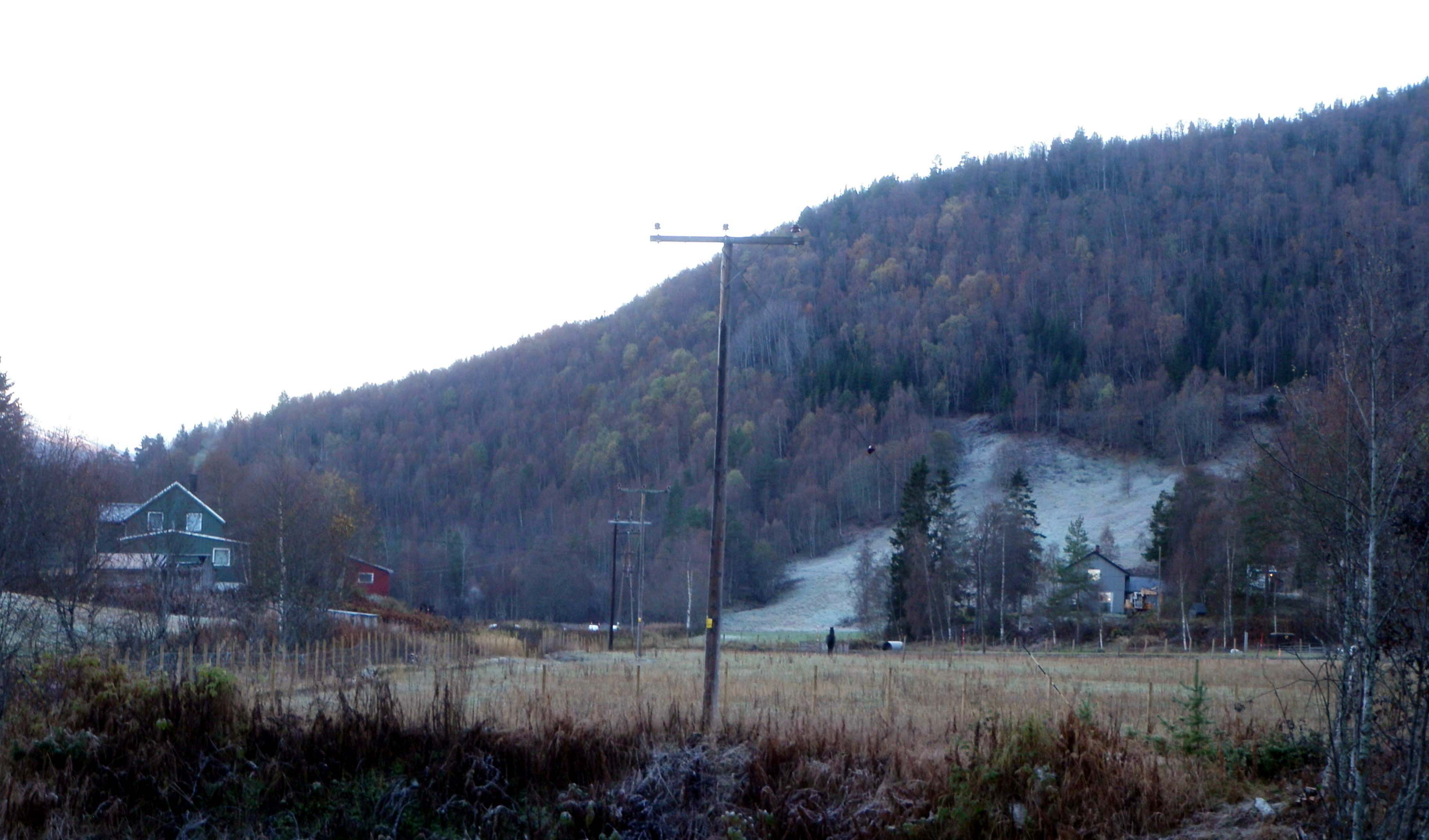
- View of the village
- Interactive map of Høyforsmoen
- Location within Nordland Location within Norway
- Coordinates: 66.9096°N 14.7493°E
- Country: Norway
- Region: Northern Norway
- County: Nordland
- District: Salten
- Municipality: Beiarn Municipality
- Elevation: 117 m (384 ft)
- Time zone: UTC+01:00 (CET)
  - Summer (DST): UTC+02:00 (CEST)
- Post Code: 8114 Tollå

Høyforsmoen is a small village in Beiarn Municipality in Nordland county, Norway. The village is located along the Beiar River in the Beiar Valley, about 20 kilometres (12 mi) southeast of the municipal centre of Moldjord. Høyforsmoen Chapel is located in this village. The lake Ramsgjelvatnet lies northeast of the village.
