= Saltfjellet =

Mountain range in Nordland, Norway

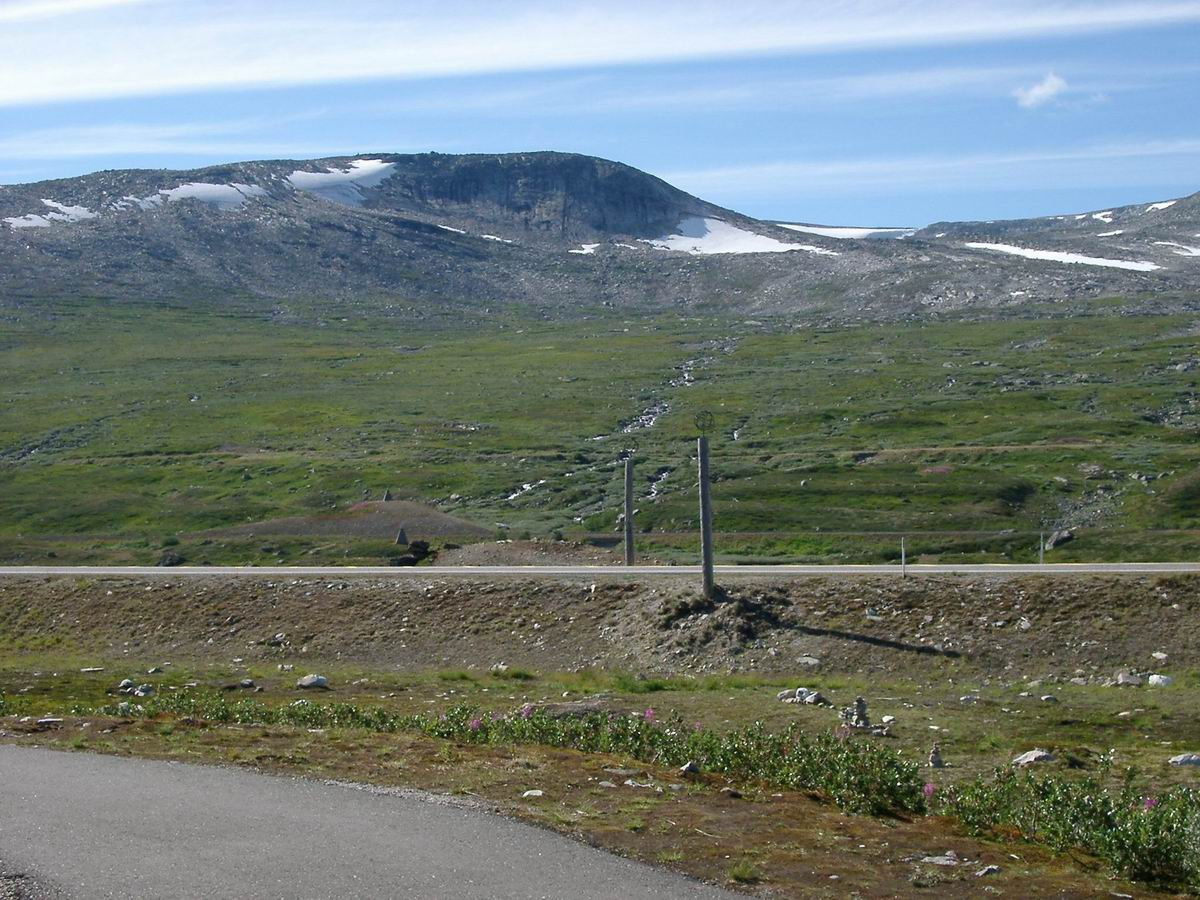
- Summer in Saltfjellet

Highest point
- Peak: Ølfjellet
- Elevation: 1,751 m (5,745 ft)
- Coordinates: 66°47′25″N 15°15′0″E

Geography
- Interactive map of the mountain
- Country: Norway
- County: Nordland

Saltfjellet is a mountainous area in Nordland county, Norway that separates the two regions of Helgeland and Salten. It is also a cultural border between the Southern and Central parts of Sápmi.

== Geography and environment ==
The Saltfjellet is one of the largest mountain ranges in Norway, and is also where the Arctic Circle cuts through the country. This range is part of seven municipalities: The northern part is part of the municipalities of Saltdal, Bodø, Beiarn and Gildeskål, the western part is in the municipalities of Meløy and Rødøy while the southern part is in Rana Municipality.

The highest mountain is Ølfjellet at 1,751 metres (5,745 ft) above sea level. The mountains stretch from the coast to the Swedish border. The glacier Svartisen is actually two glaciers, separated by the Glomdalen valley with the Glomåga river. Western Svartisen is the second largest glacier on the Norwegian mainland, and is part of the Saltfjellet-Svartisen National Park. There are many other glaciers as well. A total of 2,587 square kilometres (999 sq mi) of the area is protected. Several long valleys radiate from the mountains, such as the Dunderland Valley and Blakkådalen going south from the mountains, and Saltdalen and the Beiar Valley going northwards. The eastern part of the range forms a plateau with some gently sloping mountains, and this is where the road and railway crosses over Saltfjell. Both road and railway take advantage of the Dunderland Valley and the Saltdal valley to make the distance on the alpine tundra, which often sees snowstorms in winter, as short as possible. The western part is more alpine and steep, and this is where the engabreen glacier tongue of Western Svartisen almost reaches down to the fjord.

== Transport ==
There are two main transport routes over the mountains: the European Route E6 highway and the Nordland Line. The E6 highway was opened in 1937 and was asphalted in 1972. Until 1968 the road was closed in the winter. The railway line was built over the mountain during World War II and opened in 1947.

== Name ==
The mountain range is named after the Salten district, named after Saltfjorden (the Salt fjord). The last element is the finite form of fjell which means "mountain".

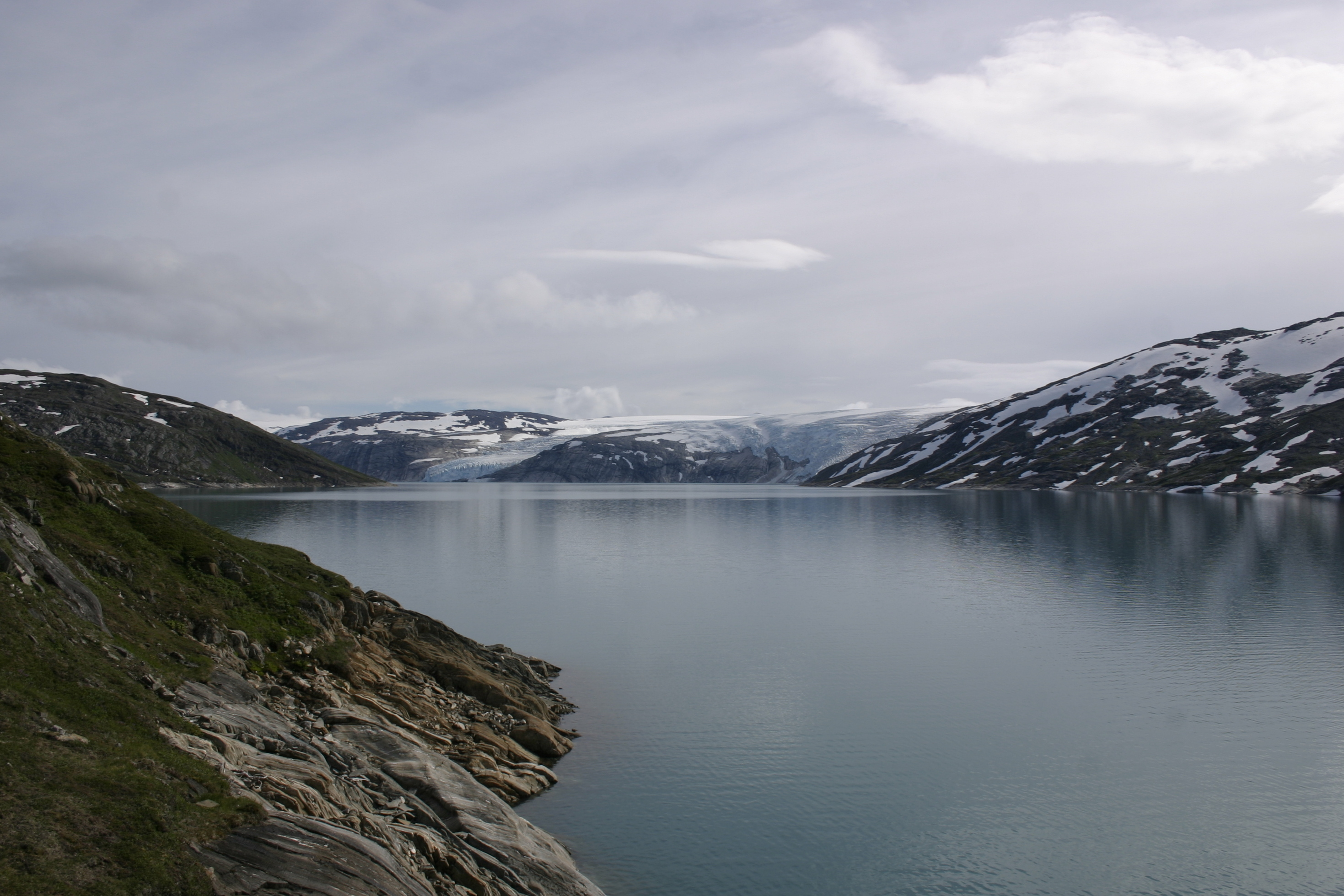
Storglomvatnet (lake), with melting water from the Svartisen glacier

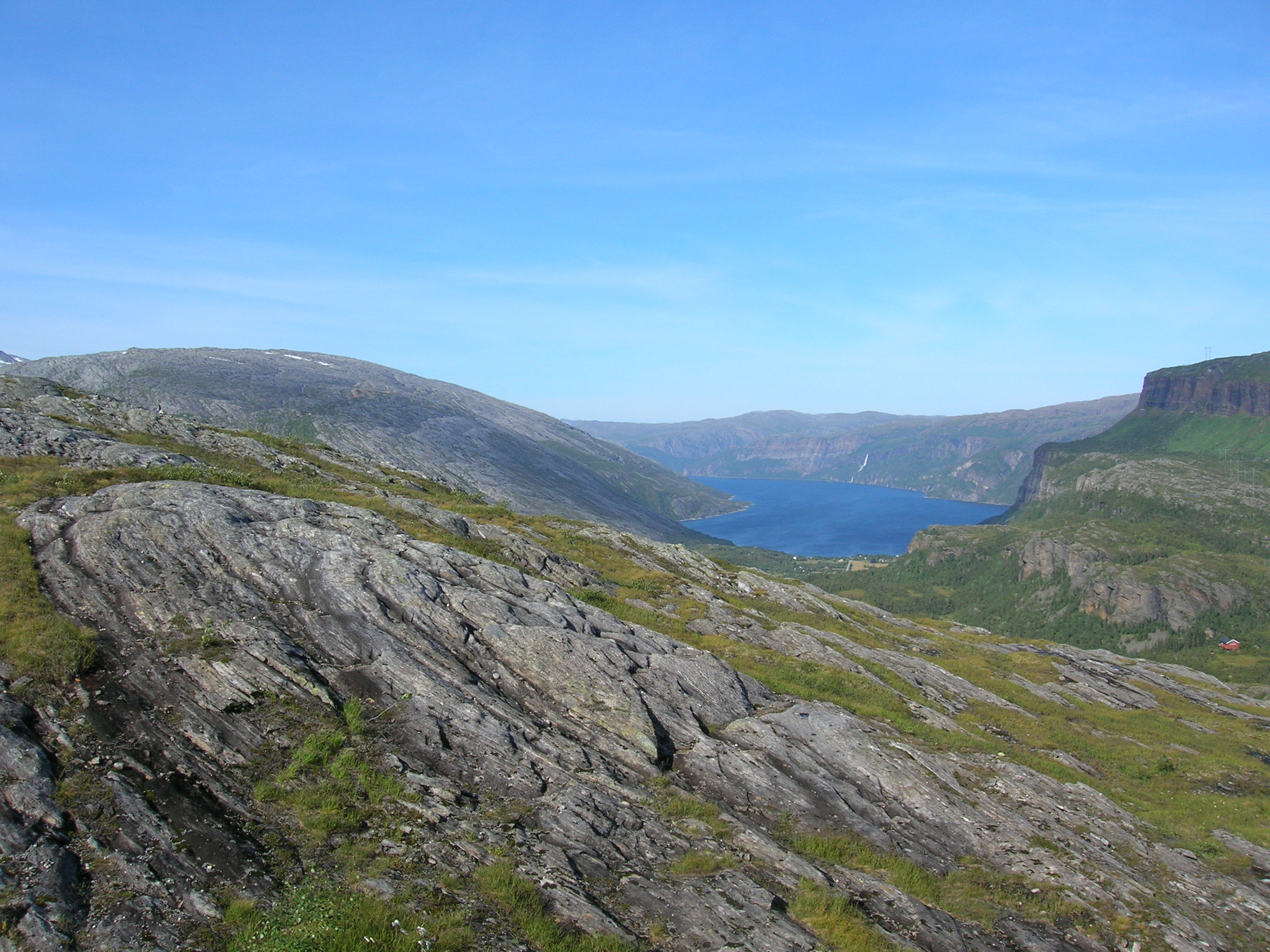
Melfjorden in Rødøy in the distance; Saltfjell goes all the way to the coast, and has proven to be a barrier for flora and fauna, including Norway spruce and the Viper.

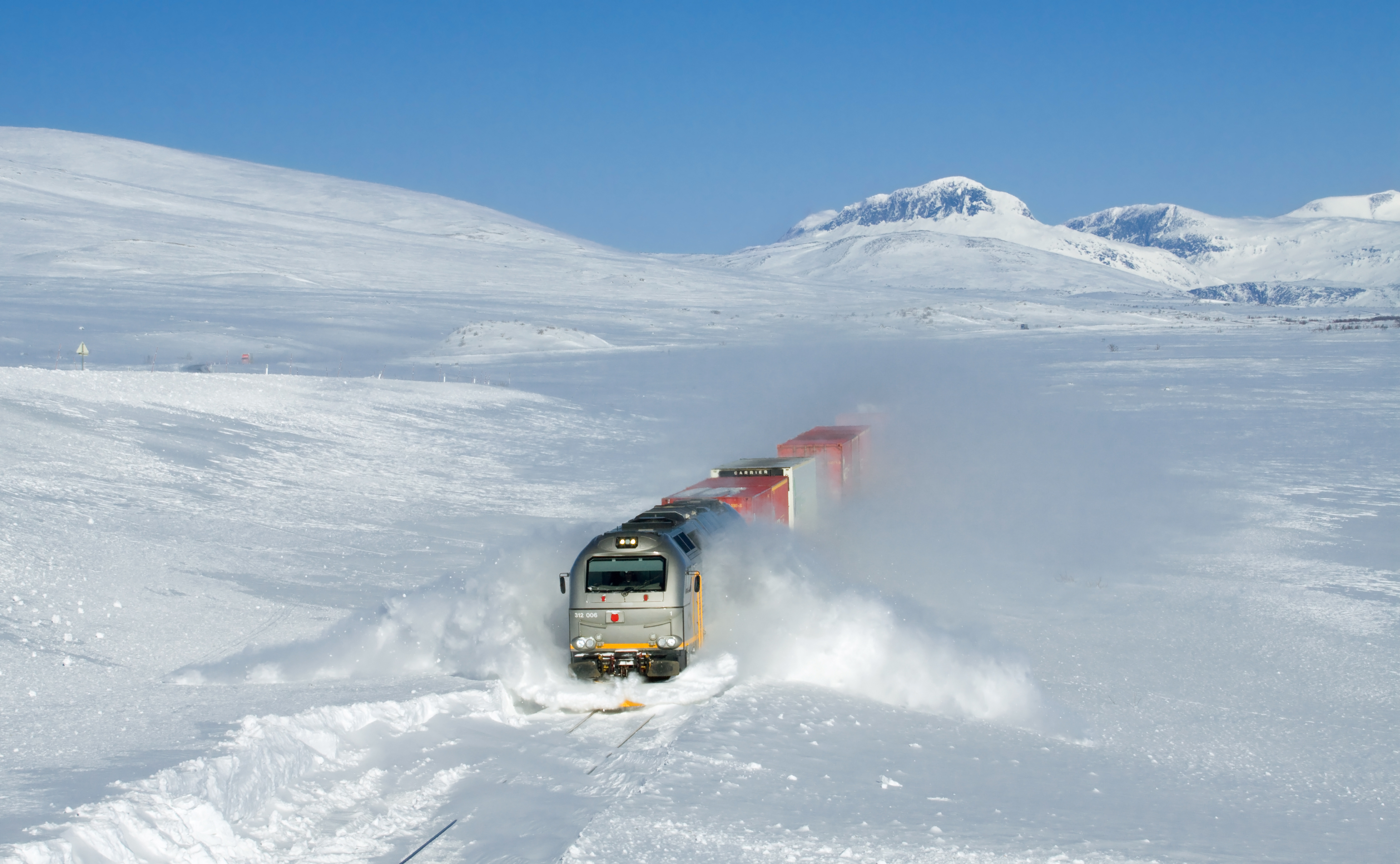
Freight train on the Saltfjellet

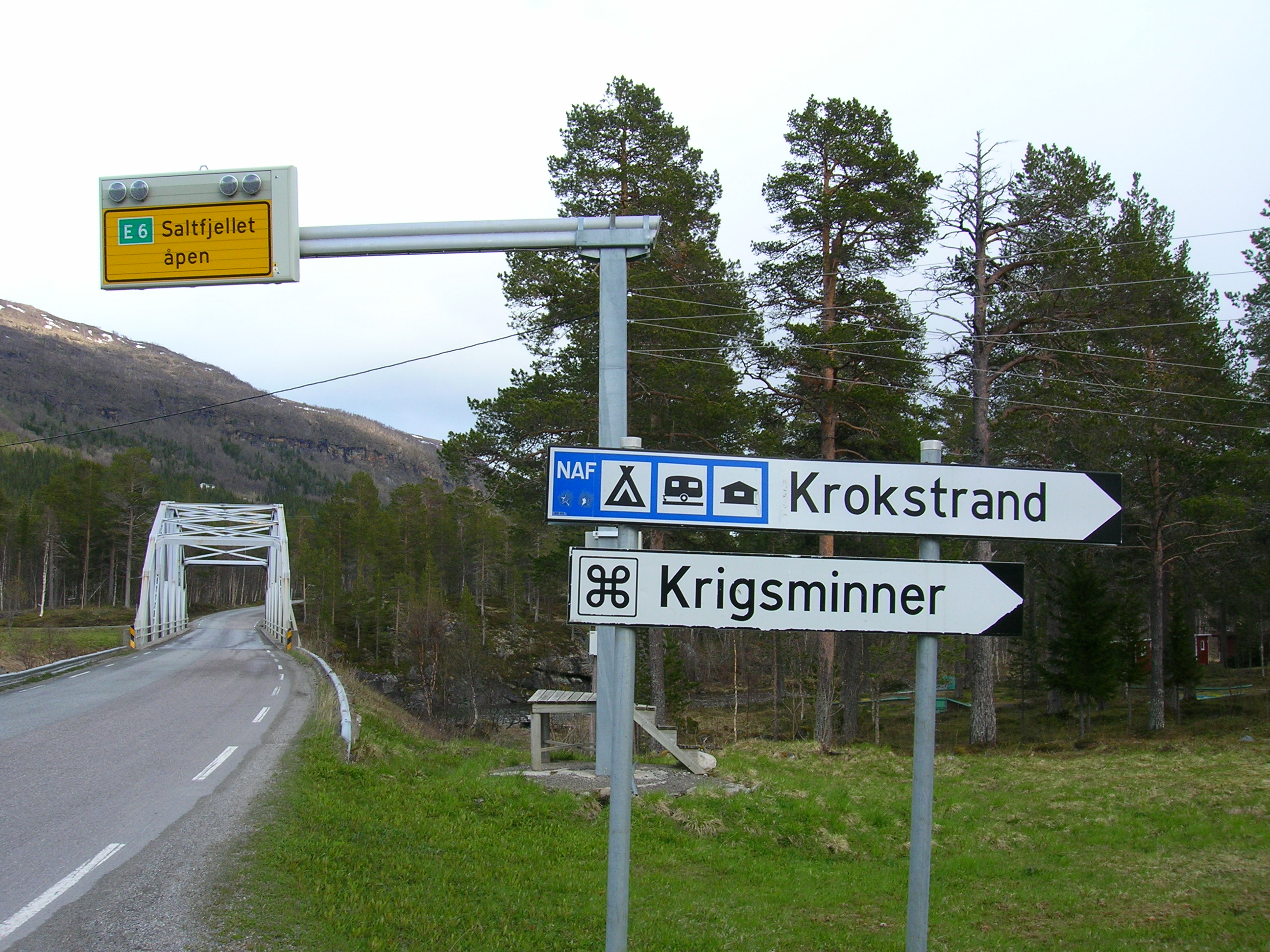
Driving the E6 road from the south, the ascent starts near Krokstrand in the Dunderland Valley.

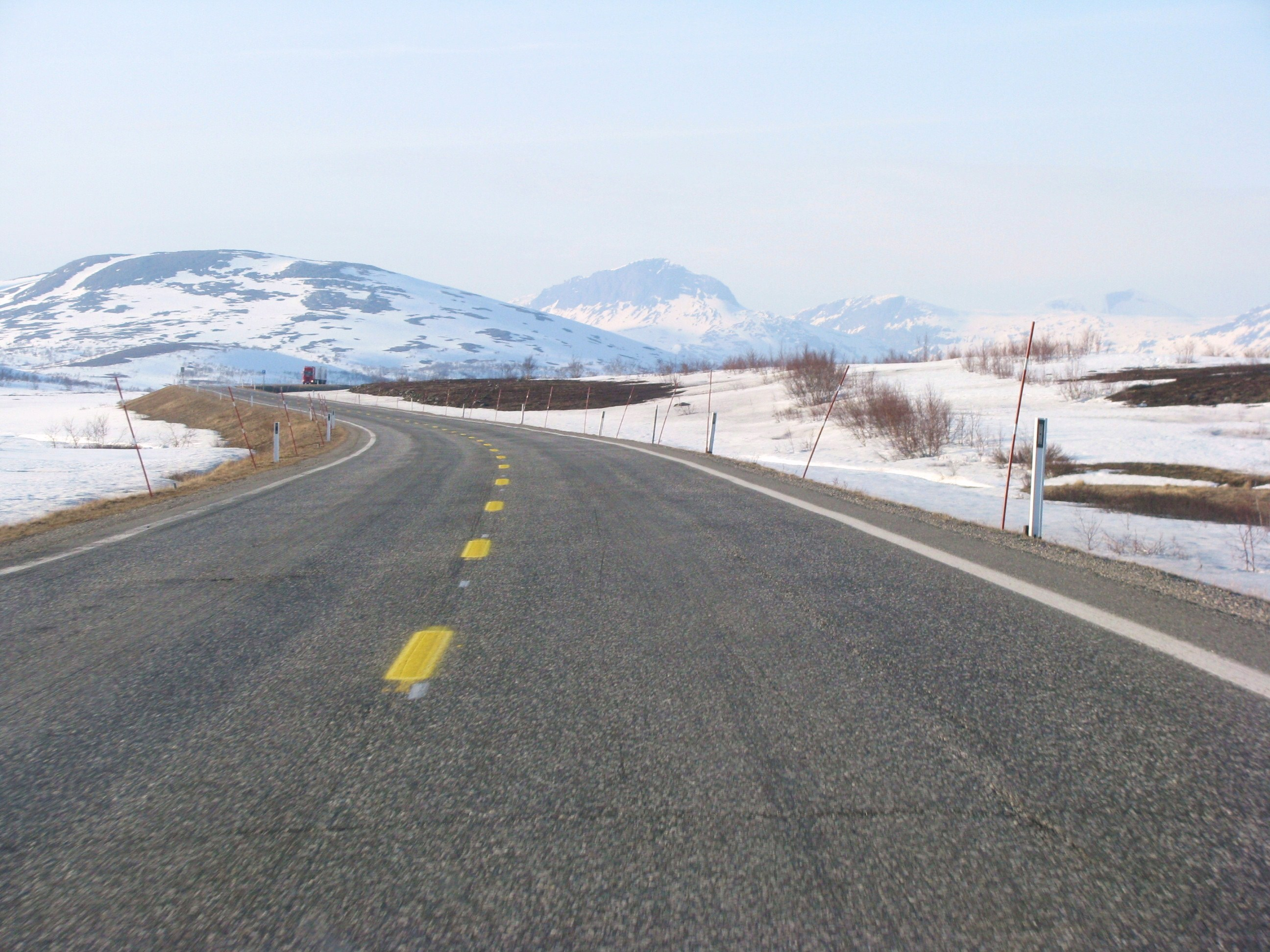
E6 road on Saltfjell, May 2011.
