= Beiarn Church =

Church in Nordland, Norway

- Beiarn kirke
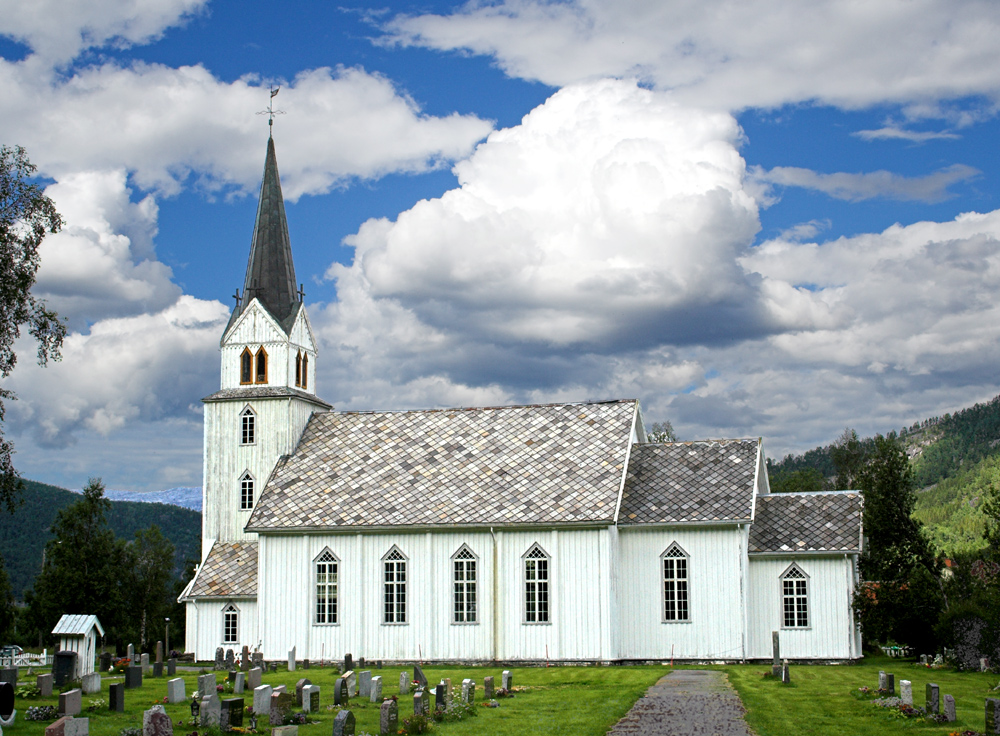
- View of the church
- Beiarn Church
- 67.00630911°N 14.5720499°E
- Location: Beiarn Municipality, Nordland
- Country: Norway
- Denomination: Church of Norway
- Churchmanship: Evangelical Lutheran

History
- Status: Parish church
- Founded: 1724
- Consecrated: 23 Oct 1873

Architecture
- Functional status: Active
- Architect: L.W. Nissen
- Architectural type: Long church
- Completed: 1873 (153 years ago)

Specifications
- Capacity: 310
- Materials: Wood

Administration
- Diocese: Sør-Hålogaland
- Deanery: Salten prosti
- Parish: Beiarn
- Norwegian Cultural Heritage Site
- Type: Church
- Status: Automatically protected
- ID: 83859

Beiarn Church (Norwegian: Beiarn kirke) is a parish church of the Church of Norway in Beiarn Municipality in Nordland county, Norway. It is located in the village of Moldjord. It is one of the churches for the Beiarn parish which is part of the Salten prosti (deanery) in the Diocese of Sør-Hålogaland. The white, wooden church was built in a long church style in 1873 using plans drawn up by the architect L. W. Nissen. The church seats about 310 people.

== History ==
The first church in Beiarn was constructed in 1724 on the recommendation of Thomas von Westen. It was called a Finnekapell because it was a chapel built to serve and evangelize the local population of Sami people (who at that time were called Finns). This first church was an annex chapel to the main Gildeskål Church until 1856 when Beiarn became its own prestegjeld. After about 150 years of use, it was decided to replace the church. The new church would be located right next to the old church. Construction on the new church started in 1872, but due to a storm on 21 January 1873, everything had to be demolished. The site was moved a short distance away and construction began again. The new church was consecrated on 23 October 1873. The new church stood for a couple of years side by side with the Old Beiarn Church before the old building was torn down and its materials sold. The new church was damaged again by another storm on 27 February 1874. The building was repaired and reinforced structurally in 1875.

After the demolition of the old chapel, the furniture of the old chapel (including the altarpiece, pulpit, baptismal font, church silver, chandeliers, and several plaques) was moved up to the attic of the new church. At that time, they had planned that this would be used in a new chapel that would have some day been built further up in Beiar Valley. The materials were soon forgotten and the other chapel was not built. When Karl Vilhelm Piene started as a parish priest at Beiarn Church in 1930, he found the old furniture, and he received approval from the parish council to put some of the old furniture into the new church.

== Media gallery ==
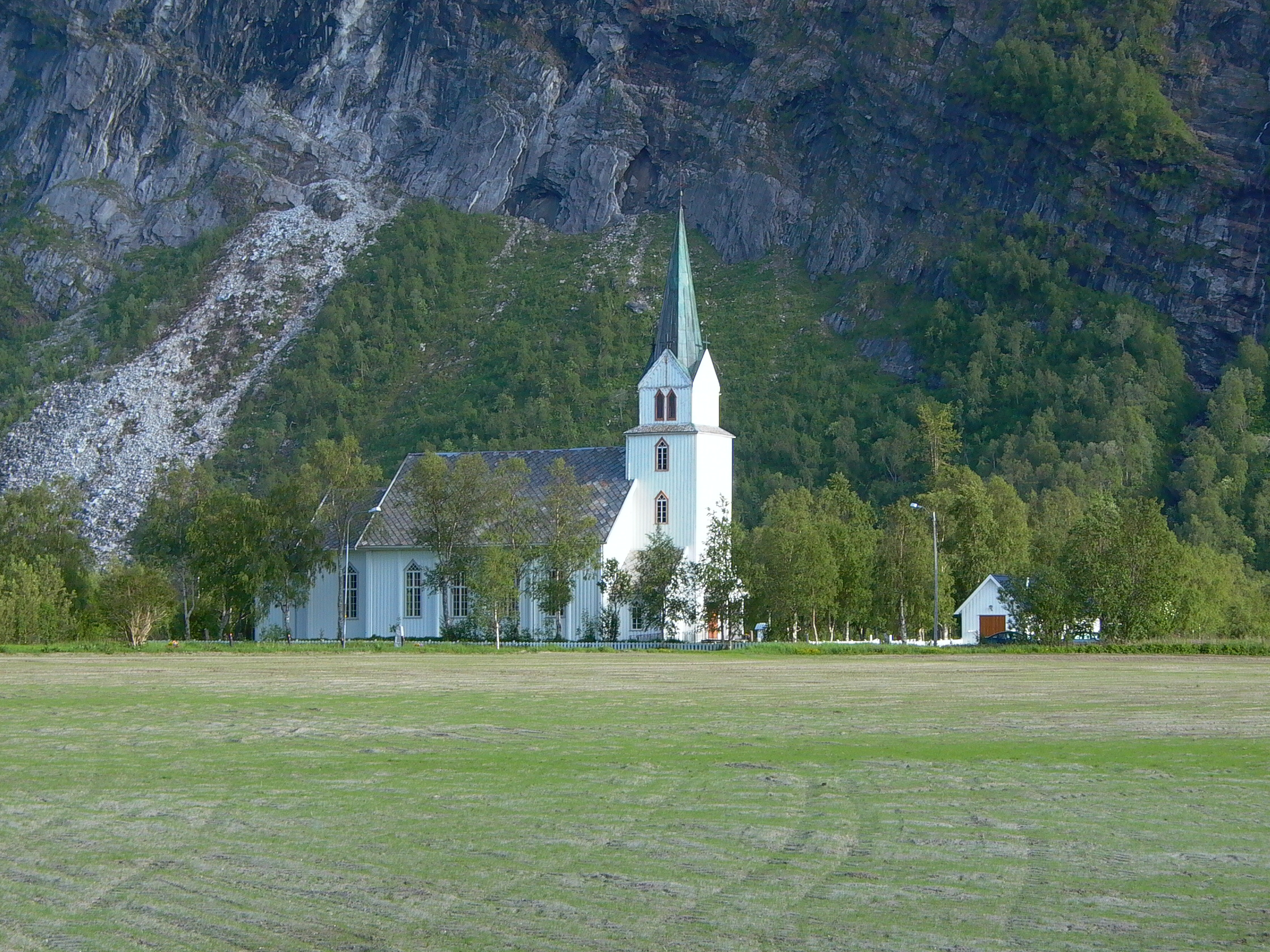

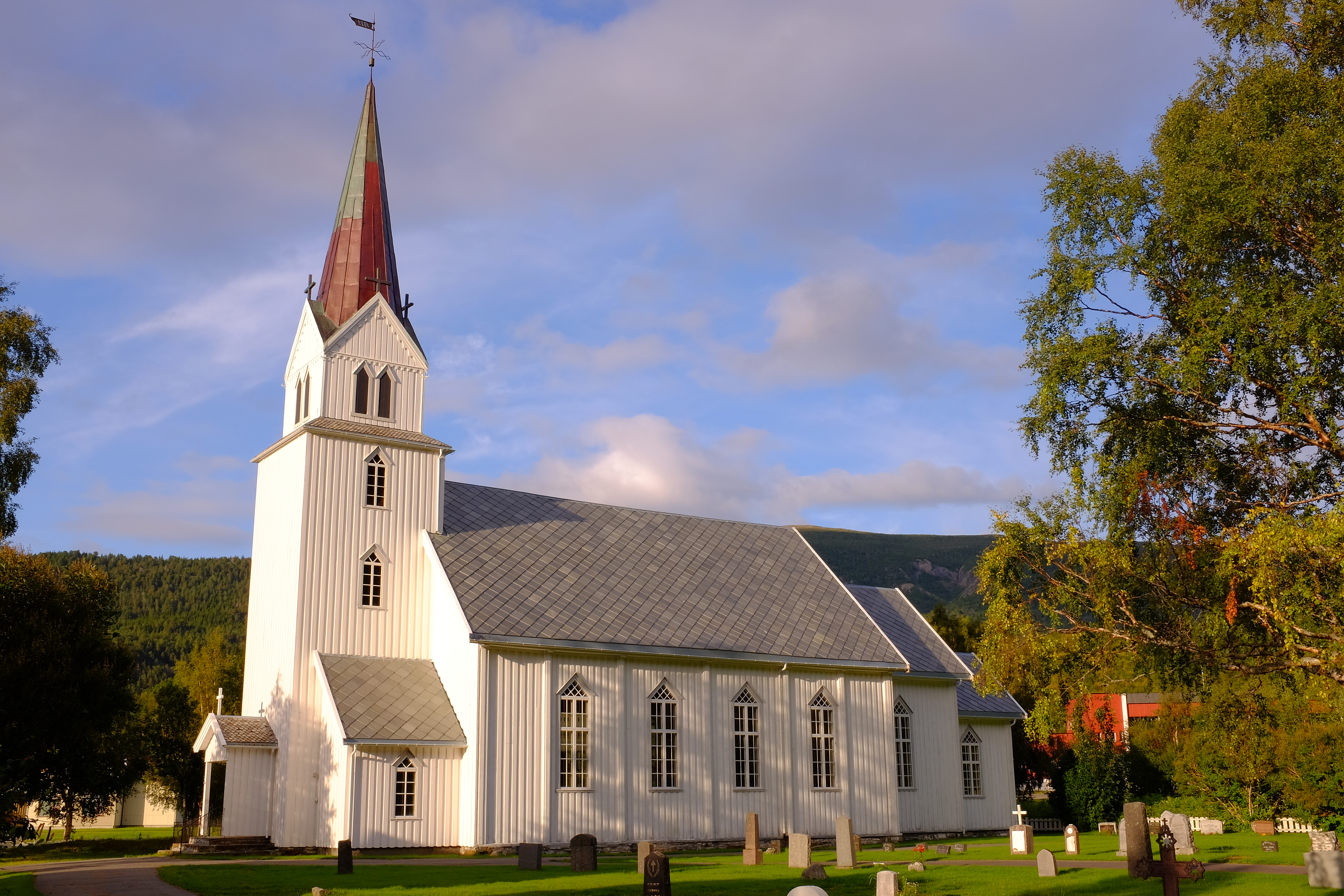

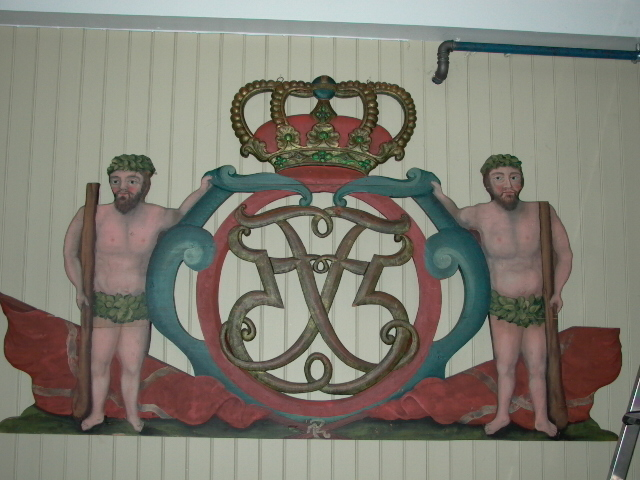

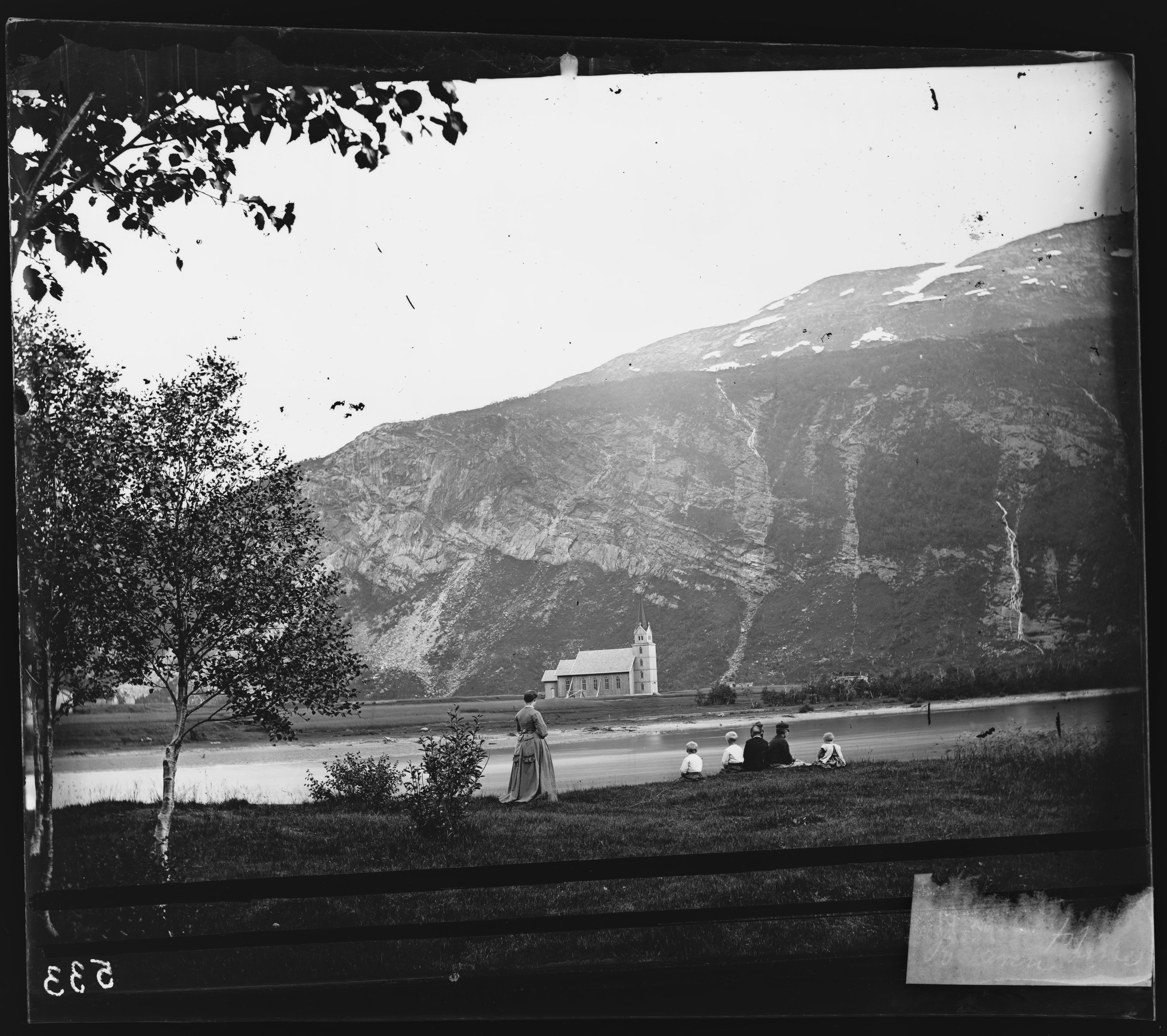

== See also ==
- List of churches in Sør-Hålogaland
