= Ramsgjelvatnet =

Lake in Beiarn, Norway

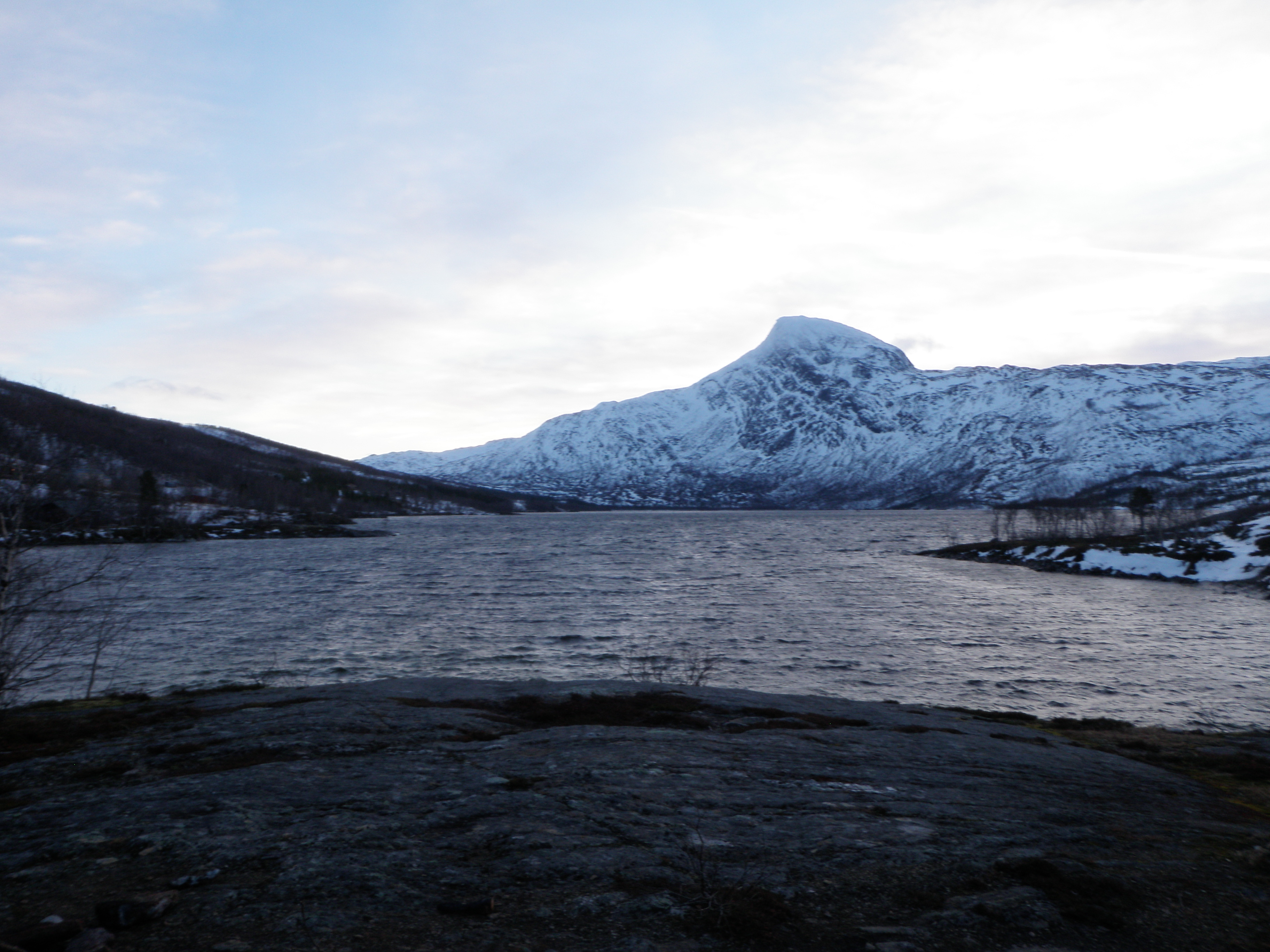
- Interactive map of the lake
- Location: Beiarn Municipality, Nordland
- Coordinates: 66.9353°N 14.8769°E
- Basin countries: Norway
- Max. length: 3 kilometres (1.9 mi)
- Max. width: 1 kilometre (0.62 mi)
- Surface area: 2.35 km^{2} (0.91 sq mi)
- Shore length^{1}: 7.79 kilometres (4.84 mi)
- Surface elevation: 308 metres (1,010 ft)
- References: NVE
- ^{1} Shore length is not a well-defined measure.

Ramsgjelvatnet is a lake that lies in Beiarn Municipality in Nordland county, Norway. The lake is located about 5 kilometres (3.1 mi) northeast of the village of Høyforsmoen and about 15 kilometres (9.3 mi) southeast of the village of Moldjord.

== See also ==
- List of lakes in Norway
- Geography of Norway
