= Simlebreen =

Glacier in Nordland, Norway

Simlebreen (Norwegian); Vátjamjåkjiehkke (Lule Sami)
- Interactive map of the glacier
- Location: Nordland, Norway
- Coordinates: 66°50′N 14°27′E
- Area: 21 km^{2} (8.1 sq mi)
- Highest elevation: 1,200 metres (3,900 ft)

Simlebreen (Norwegian) or Vátjamjåkjiehkke (Lule Sami) is a glacier in Beiarn Municipality in Nordland county, Norway. The 21-square-kilometre (8.1 sq mi) glacier lies about 20 kilometres (12 mi) north of the much larger glacier named Svartisen, making it the 18th largest glacier on the Norwegian mainland. However a 2018 study concluded that the glacier's area had diminished from 22-square-kilometre (8.5 sq mi) in 1999, to 17.5-square-kilometre (6.8 sq mi) in 2018. The mountain Simletinden lies on the East side of the glacier, reaching a height of 1,329 metres (4,360 ft).

== See also ==
- List of glaciers in Norway
