= Kristian Moljord =

Norwegian politician

Kristian Magnus Falsen Johansen Moljord (6 August 1882 – 29 October 1976) was a Norwegian politician for the Communist Party.

He was born in Beiarn Municipality.

He worked as a fisher from 1897, a railroad (Ofotbanen) worker in 1901 and then as a miner in Sulitjelma from 1903 to 1945. Moljord was a member of the municipal council for Fauske Municipality from 1910 to 1916, 1931 to 1940 and 1947 to 1959.

He was elected to the Norwegian Parliament from Nordland in 1945, but was not re-elected in 1949 as the Communist Party dropped from 11 to 0 seats in Parliament.
