= Blakkådalen =

Valley in Nordland, Norway

Blakkådalen (Norwegian) Mieltek (Lule Sami)
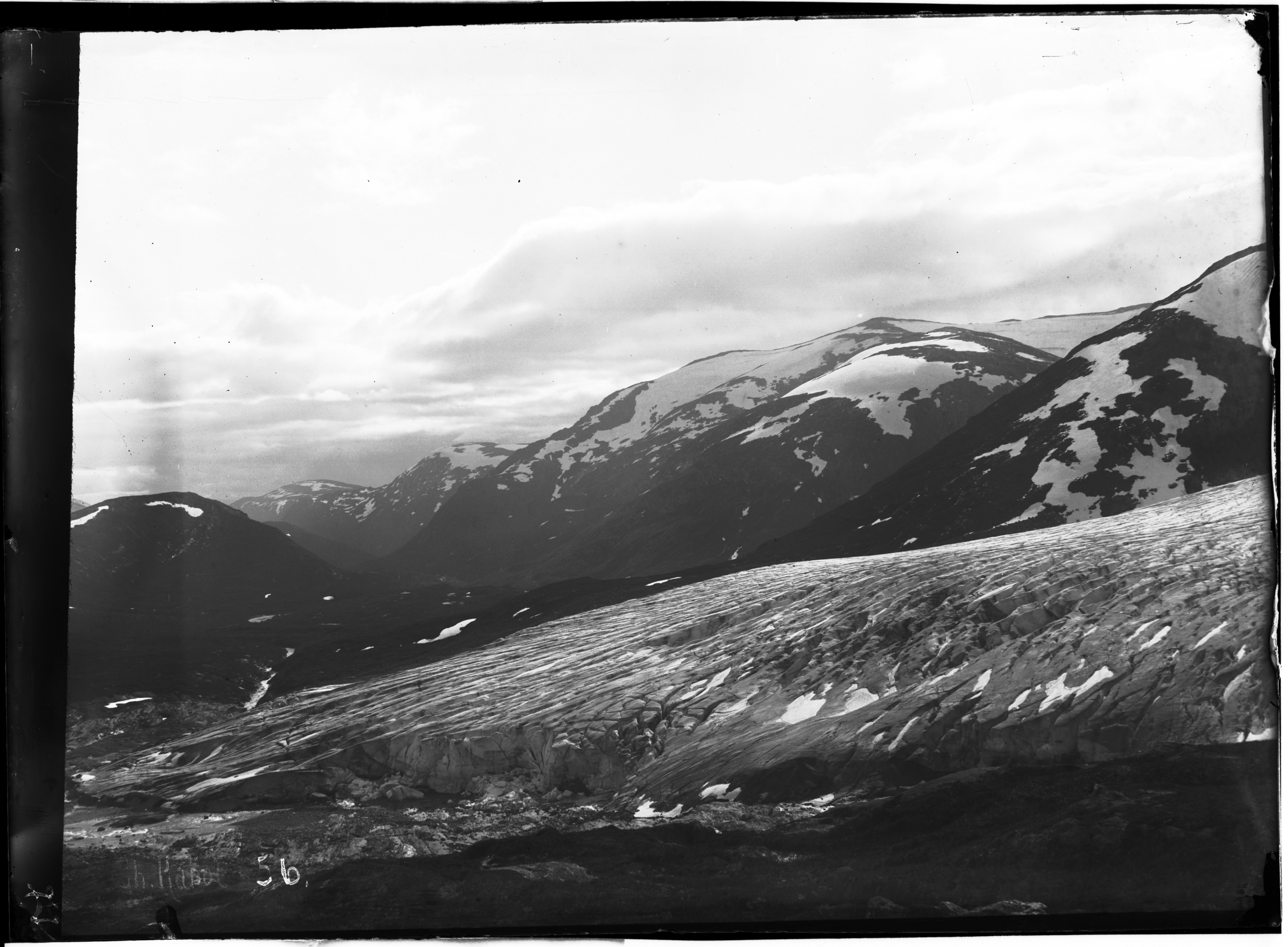
- View of a glacier above the Blakkådalen

Geology
- Type: River valley

Geography
- Location: Nordland, Norway
- Coordinates: 66.4892°N 14.3323°E

Location
- Interactive map of the valley

Blakkådalen (Norwegian) or Mieltek (Lule Sami) is a valley in Rana Municipality in Nordland county, Norway. The valley is located on the eastern side of the Svartisen glacier, and partly within the Saltfjellet–Svartisen National Park. The Blakkåga river flows through the valley.
