= Bodø Region =

Urban region in Nordland, Norway

Coordinates: 67.2209°N 14.6148°E

Bodø Region (Norwegian: Bodøregionen) is a city region in Nordland county, Norway, centred on the town of Bodø. The term is used for a core area around Bodø and is narrower than the traditional district of Salten.

In the Norwegian government's 2002–2003 white paper on urban policy, Bodø Region was listed as one of the country's larger city regions. In that definition, the region comprised the municipalities of Bodø, Gildeskål, Beiarn and Skjerstad. After Skjerstad was merged into Bodø Municipality in 2005, the original definition effectively covered three municipalities.

Later official analyses have sometimes used a broader definition of Bodøregionen. A government evaluation of the relocation of the Civil Aviation Authority of Norway stated that the region was based on the Bodø labour-market region, consisting of Bodø and Gildeskål, but enlarged to include Fauske because of commuting links to Bodø. This reflects Bodø's role as the dominant urban centre in the central part of Nordland.

Bodø functions as the county's administrative centre and its main transport hub. The Nordland Line ends at Bodø, the town is served by Bodø Airport, and Norwegian National Road 80 links Bodø with Fauske and the inland trunk routes. Coastal shipping is also important; Hurtigruten calls at Bodø daily, and the city is a key node for express boats and ferries in Nordland. Because of these functions, Bodø Region is often treated as the urban core of the wider Salten area rather than as a synonym for Salten as a whole.
