= Beiarn Municipality =

Municipality in Nordland, Norway

Beiarn Municipality Beiarn kommune
- Municipality
- Beiara herred (historic name); Beieren herred (historic name)
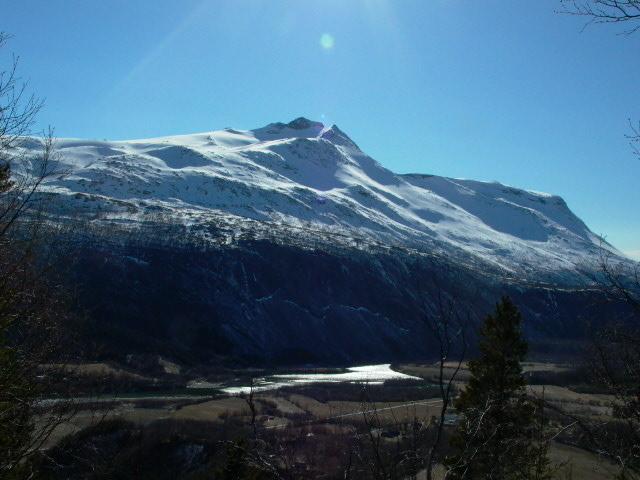

- Coat of arms

- Nordland within Norway

- Beiarn within Nordland
- Coordinates: 66°55′02″N 14°40′29″E
- Country: Norway
- County: Nordland
- District: Salten
- Established: 1853
  - Preceded by: Gildeskål Municipality
- Administrative centre: Moldjord

Government
  - Mayor (2023): Andrè Kristoffersen (Sp)

Area
  - Total: 1,222.31 km^{2} (471.94 sq mi)
  - Land: 1,178.76 km^{2} (455.12 sq mi)
  - Water: 43.55 km^{2} (16.81 sq mi) 3.6%
  - Rank: #88 in Norway
- Highest elevation: 1,634.52 m (5,362.6 ft)

Population (2024)
  - Total: 1,062
  - Rank: #333 in Norway
  - Density: 0.9/km^{2} (2.3/sq mi)
  - Change (10 years): ▼ −2.4%
- Demonym: Beiarværing

Official language
  - Norwegian form: Bokmål
- Time zone: UTC+01:00 (CET)
  - Summer (DST): UTC+02:00 (CEST)
- ISO 3166 code: NO-1839
- Website: Official website

Beiarn is a municipality in Nordland county, Norway. It is part of the traditional district of Salten. Beiarn is also a part of the Bodø Region, a statistical metropolitan region. The administrative centre of the municipality is the village of Moldjord. Other villages in Beiarn are Høyforsmoen, Trones, and Tverrvika.

The 1,222-square-kilometre (472 sq mi) municipality is the 88th largest by area out of the 357 municipalities in Norway. Beiarn Municipality is the 333rd most populous municipality in Norway with a population of 1,062. The municipality's population density is 0.9 inhabitants per square kilometre (2.3/sq mi) and its population has decreased by 2.4% over the previous 10-year period.

== General information ==
The municipality of Beiarn was established in 1853 when it was separated from the large Gildeskål Municipality. Initially, Beiarn had 1,164 residents. The municipal boundaries have not changed since that time.

=== Name ===
The municipality (originally the parish) is named after the Beiar Fjord (Old Norse: Beðir or Beðinn). The meaning of the name is uncertain. It may be derived from the plural form of the word beðr which means "bedding" (in the sense of a "river bed". Another option is that it is the past participle of the word biðja which means "to pray" or "to ask". Historically, the name of the municipality was spelled Beieren. On 6 January 1908, a royal resolution changed the spelling of the name of the municipality to Beiara. This spelling, however, was not well-liked. On 19 August 1908 (a few months later), another royal resolution changed the spelling of the name of the municipality to Beiarn.

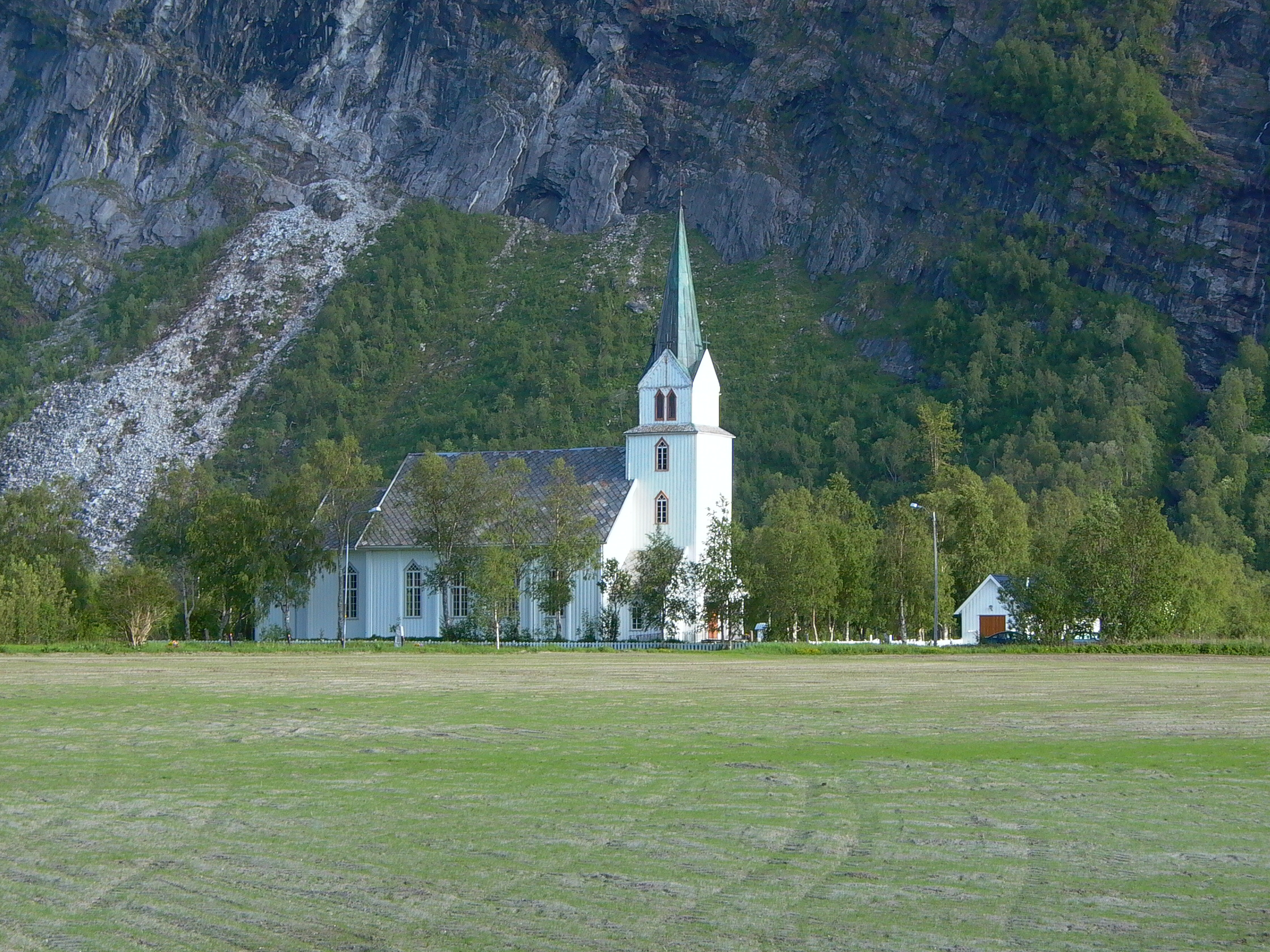
Beiarn Church

=== Coat of arms ===
The coat of arms has been used in Beiarn since 1988. The blazon is "Vert, a pine tree uprooted Or" (Norwegian: I gull en furu på grønn bunn). This means the arms have a green field (background) and the charge is a pine tree. The pine tree has a tincture of Or which means it is commonly colored yellow, but if it is made out of metal, then gold is used. The pine tree was chosen to symbolize the mighty pine forests for which Beiarn has historically been well-known. This is mentioned both by Petter Dass' "Nordlands Trompet" and in Lars Hess Bing's "Description of the Kingdom of Norway, the Isles of Iceland and the Faroe Islands, as well as Greenland". There are remains of giant pine trees that are likely over one thousand years old. The green color of the field was chosen to represent the lush green forests and the gold/yellow color was chosen because the forest is "worth its weight in gold" for the municipality. The arms were designed by Erik Gabrielsen, who was a cultural consultant in Beiarn municipality. In 1995, the municipality applied to have the arms formally approved for use by the National Archives of Norway, but they were not approved because it did not meet the heraldic standards for coats of arms in Norway. The National Archives told the municipality that they can use the unapproved arms in some circumstances, but they cannot be put on a flag, road sign, or public buildings.

=== Churches ===
The Church of Norway has one parish (sokn) within Beiarn Municipality. It is part of the Salten prosti (deanery) in the Diocese of Sør-Hålogaland.

Churches in Beiarn Municipality
Parish (sokn)	Church Name	Location of the Church	Year built
Beiarn	Beiarn Church	Moldjord	1873
Beiarn	Høyforsmoen Chapel	Høyforsmoen	1957

A privately owned stave church was built in 2006 at Savjord, about 8 kilometres (5.0 mi) east of Moldjord. The Savjord Stave Church was modeled after the Gol Stave Church.

== Geography ==
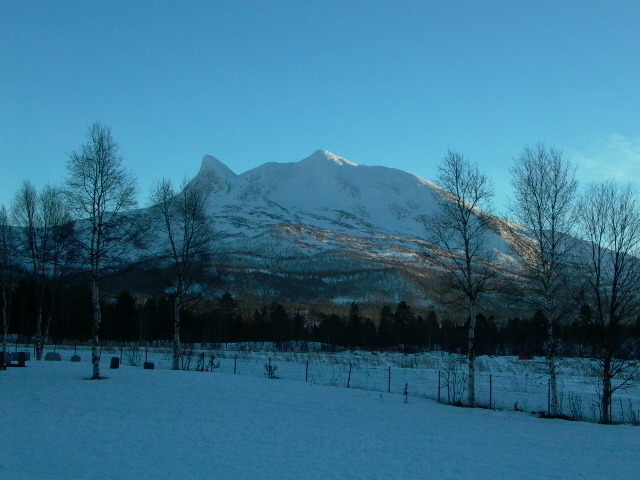
Tellingen mountain in February

The municipality of Beiarn is located just north of the Arctic Circle, along the Beiar River including the Beiar Valley and some surrounding areas in the Saltfjellet mountains. The highest point in the municipality is the 1,634.52-metre (5,362.6 ft) tall mountain Skjelåtinden. The river is one of the best salmon rivers in Northern Norway. There are several large lakes in Beiarn including Arstaddalsdammen, Litle Sokumvatnet, and Ramsgjelvatnet.

The Saltfjellet–Svartisen National Park is partially located in Beiarn. The Svartisen and Simlebreen glaciers are both located in Beiarn. The world's most northern naturally occurring elm forest (Ulmus glabra) grows in the Arstadlia nature reserve, where the rich vegetation also includes orchids.

== Government ==
Beiarn Municipality is responsible for primary education (through 10th grade), outpatient health services, senior citizen services, welfare and other social services, zoning, economic development, and municipal roads and utilities. The municipality is governed by a municipal council of directly elected representatives. The mayor is indirectly elected by a vote of the municipal council. The municipality is under the jurisdiction of the Salten og Lofoten District Court and the Hålogaland Court of Appeal.

=== Municipal council ===
The municipal council (Kommunestyre) of Beiarn Municipality is made up of 15 representatives that are elected to four year terms. The tables below show the current and historical composition of the council by political party.

Beiarn kommunestyre 2023–2027
Party name (in Norwegian)	Number of representatives
Labour Party (Arbeiderpartiet)	4
Centre Party (Senterpartiet)	6
Beiarn Local List (Beiarn Bygdeliste)	5
Total number of members:	15

Beiarn kommunestyre 2019–2023
Party name (in Norwegian)	Number of representatives
Labour Party (Arbeiderpartiet)	3
Centre Party (Senterpartiet)	9
Beiarn Local List (Beiarn Bygdeliste)	3
Total number of members:	15

Beiarn kommunestyre 2015–2019
Party name (in Norwegian)	Number of representatives
Labour Party (Arbeiderpartiet)	6
Centre Party (Senterpartiet)	5
Beiarn Local List (Beiarn Bygdeliste)	4
Total number of members:	15

Beiarn kommunestyre 2011–2015
Party name (in Norwegian)	Number of representatives
Labour Party (Arbeiderpartiet)	7
Centre Party (Senterpartiet)	4
Beiarn Local List (Beiarn Bygdeliste)	4
Total number of members:	15

Beiarn kommunestyre 2007–2011
Party name (in Norwegian)	Number of representatives
Labour Party (Arbeiderpartiet)	5
Centre Party (Senterpartiet)	2
Beiarn local list (Beiarn bygdeliste)	8
Total number of members:	15

Beiarn kommunestyre 2003–2007
Party name (in Norwegian)	Number of representatives
Labour Party (Arbeiderpartiet)	7
Centre Party (Senterpartiet)	2
Beiarn local list (Beiarn Bygdeliste)	4
Rural development list (Bygdeutviklingslista)	2
Total number of members:	15

Beiarn kommunestyre 1999–2003
Party name (in Norwegian)	Number of representatives
Labour Party (Arbeiderpartiet)	8
Progress Party (Fremskrittspartiet)	1
Centre Party (Senterpartiet)	5
Beiarn local list (Beiarn bygdeliste)	3
Total number of members:	17

Beiarn kommunestyre 1995–1999
Party name (in Norwegian)	Number of representatives
Labour Party (Arbeiderpartiet)	7
Conservative Party (Høyre)	1
Socialist Left Party (Sosialistisk Venstreparti)	1
Joint list of the Centre Party (Senterpartiet) and the Christian Democratic Party (Kristelig Folkeparti)	8
Total number of members:	17

Beiarn kommunestyre 1991–1995
Party name (in Norwegian)	Number of representatives
Labour Party (Arbeiderpartiet)	7
Conservative Party (Høyre)	2
Joint list of the Centre Party (Senterpartiet) and the Christian Democratic Party (Kristelig Folkeparti)	7
Local people's list (Bygdefolkets liste)	1
Total number of members:	17

Beiarn kommunestyre 1987–1991
Party name (in Norwegian)	Number of representatives
Labour Party (Arbeiderpartiet)	9
Conservative Party (Høyre)	2
Joint list of the Centre Party (Senterpartiet) and the Christian Democratic Party (Kristelig Folkeparti)	4
Local people's list (Bygdefolkets liste)	2
Total number of members:	17

Beiarn kommunestyre 1983–1987
Party name (in Norwegian)	Number of representatives
Labour Party (Arbeiderpartiet)	9
Conservative Party (Høyre)	1
Joint list of the Centre Party (Senterpartiet) and the Christian Democratic Party (Kristelig Folkeparti)	5
Local people's list (Bygdefolkets lista)	
Working people's list (Arbeidsfolkets liste)	1
Total number of members:	17

Beiarn kommunestyre 1979–1983
Party name (in Norwegian)	Number of representatives
Labour Party (Arbeiderpartiet)	9
Conservative Party (Høyre)	2
Joint list of the Centre Party (Senterpartiet) and the Christian Democratic Party (Kristelig Folkeparti)	5
Local people's list (Bygdefolkets liste)	1
Total number of members:	17

Beiarn kommunestyre 1975–1979
Party name (in Norwegian)	Number of representatives
Labour Party (Arbeiderpartiet)	9
Joint list of the Centre Party (Senterpartiet) and the Christian Democratic Party (Kristelig Folkeparti)	8
Total number of members:	17

Beiarn kommunestyre 1971–1975
Party name (in Norwegian)	Number of representatives
Labour Party (Arbeiderpartiet)	12
Centre Party (Senterpartiet)	4
Local List(s) (Lokale lister)	1
Total number of members:	17

Beiarn kommunestyre 1967–1971
Party name (in Norwegian)	Number of representatives
Labour Party (Arbeiderpartiet)	11
Christian Democratic Party (Kristelig Folkeparti)	1
Centre Party (Senterpartiet)	5
Total number of members:	17

Beiarn kommunestyre 1963–1967
Party name (in Norwegian)	Number of representatives
Labour Party (Arbeiderpartiet)	10
Christian Democratic Party (Kristelig Folkeparti)	2
Centre Party (Senterpartiet)	2
Local List(s) (Lokale lister)	3
Total number of members:	17

Beiarn herredsstyre 1959–1963
Party name (in Norwegian)	Number of representatives
Labour Party (Arbeiderpartiet)	9
Joint List(s) of Non-Socialist Parties (Borgerlige Felleslister)	5
Local List(s) (Lokale lister)	3
Total number of members:	17

Beiarn herredsstyre 1955–1959
Party name (in Norwegian)	Number of representatives
Labour Party (Arbeiderpartiet)	10
Christian Democratic Party (Kristelig Folkeparti)	2
Local List(s) (Lokale lister)	5
Total number of members:	17

Beiarn herredsstyre 1951–1955
Party name (in Norwegian)	Number of representatives
Labour Party (Arbeiderpartiet)	9
Christian Democratic Party (Kristelig Folkeparti)	3
Joint List(s) of Non-Socialist Parties (Borgerlige Felleslister)	4
Total number of members:	16

Beiarn herredsstyre 1947–1951
Party name (in Norwegian)	Number of representatives
Labour Party (Arbeiderpartiet)	11
Christian Democratic Party (Kristelig Folkeparti)	5
Total number of members:	16

Beiarn herredsstyre 1945–1947
Party name (in Norwegian)	Number of representatives
Labour Party (Arbeiderpartiet)	13
List of workers, fishermen, and small farmholders (Arbeidere, fiskere, småbrukere liste)	1
Local List(s) (Lokale lister)	2
Total number of members:	16

Beiarn herredsstyre 1937–1941*
Party name (in Norwegian)	Number of representatives
Labour Party (Arbeiderpartiet)	11
Farmers' Party (Bondepartiet)	1
Local List(s) (Lokale lister)	4
Total number of members:	16
Note: Due to the German occupation of Norway during World War II, no elections were held for new municipal councils until after the war ended in 1945.

=== Mayors ===
The mayor (Norwegian: ordfører) of Beiarn Municipality is the political leader of the municipality and the chairperson of the municipal council. Here is a list of people who have held this position:

- 1853–1858: Lars Hansen Næss
- 1859–1861: Wilhelm Anton Feght
- 1863–1866: Lars Hansen Næss
- 1867–1868: Eiler Rosenvinge Kaurin
- 1869–1870: Lars Hansen Næss
- 1871–1877: Gustav Sophus Janke
- 1878–1886: Ole Andreas Anderssen
- 1887–1896: Christian Angell Pedersen Storjord
- 1897–1900: Jørgen Blydt Mowinckel
- 1901–1902: Lorents Rasch
- 1903–1906: Christian Angell Pedersen Storjord
- 1907–1908: Halfdan Johannessen Osbak
- 1909–1916: Johan Christoffersen
- 1917–1925: Arne Pedersen Øines
- 1926–1928: Johan Christoffersen
- 1929–1934: Edvard Nilsen
- 1935–1941: Julius J. Einan
- 1941–1945: Sverre Gloppen (NS)
- 1945–1955: Julius J. Einan
- 1956–1957: Haakon Innset
- 1958–1967: Karl Leithe
- 1968–1971: Erling Jakobsen
- 1972–1983: Osvald Tollåli
- 1983–1990: Arne Larsen
- 1991–1998: Paul Eggesvik
- 1999–2010: Frigg-Ottar Os
- 2011–2023: Monika Sande (Sp)
- 2023–present: Andrè Kristoffersen (Sp)

== Attractions ==
The area offers many outdoor activities to visitors, including fishing, caving, and mountain walking. The Beiarn farm museum includes an overview of Beiarn's cultural history, from the Viking Age through to the middle of the 20th century.

== Notable people ==
- Kristian Moljord (1882 in Beiarn – 1976), a fisherman, railroad worker, miner, and politician

== See also ==
- Bearn
