= Kjellingstraumen Bridge =

Bridge in Gildeskål, Norway

Kjellingstraumen Bridge Kjellingstraumen bru Kjellingstraumbrua
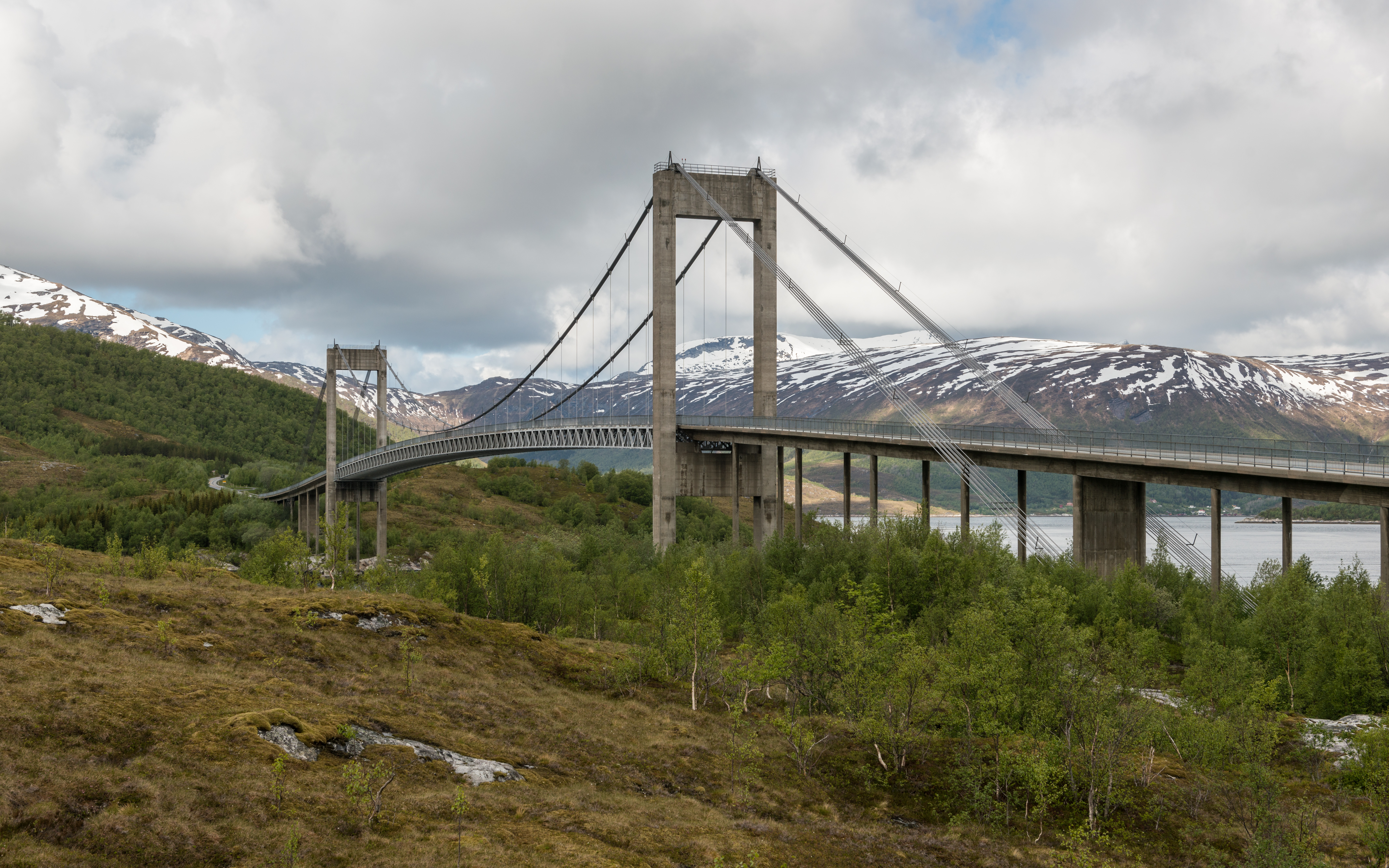
- View of the bridge
- Coordinates: 67°04′42″N 14°18′05″E
- Carries: Fv17
- Crosses: Kjellingsundet strait at the mouth of the Beiar Fjord
- Locale: Gildeskål Municipality, Norway

Characteristics
- Design: Suspension bridge
- Total length: 662 metres (2,172 ft)
- Longest span: 260 metres (850 ft)
- Clearance below: 29 metres (95 ft)

History
- Opened: 1975

The Kjellingstraumen Bridge (Norwegian: Kjellingstraumen bru or Kjellingstraumbrua) is a suspension bridge that crosses the Kjellingsundet strait at the mouth of the Beiar Fjord (Norwegian: Beiarfjorden) in Gildeskål Municipality, Nordland county, Norway. The bridge, which has a total length of 662-metre (2,172 ft), carries Norwegian County Road 17. It was opened in 1975, featuring the longest span of 260 metres (850 ft).

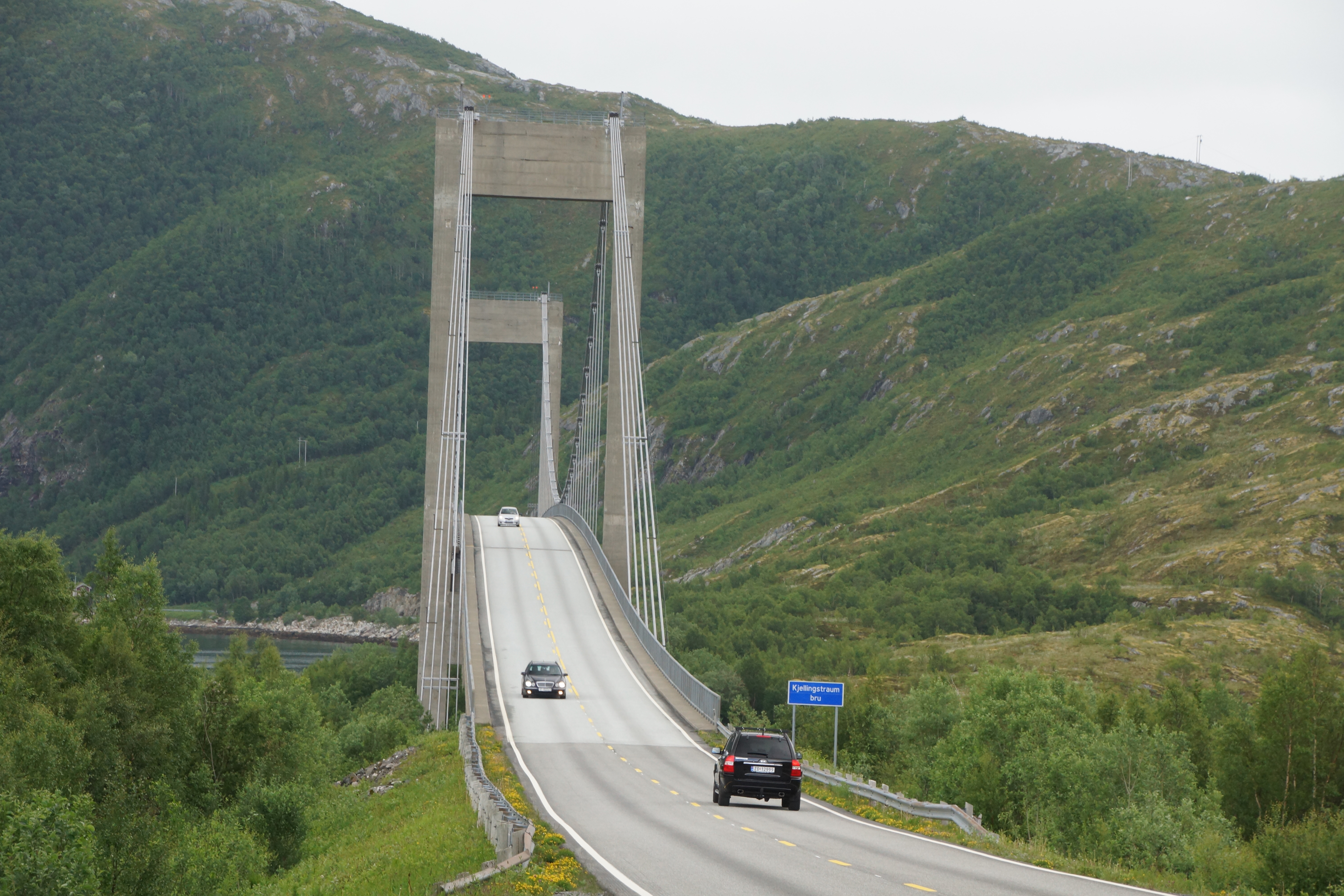
The Kjellingstraumen Bridge
