= Høyforsmoen Chapel =

Church in Nordland, Norway

- Høyforsmoen kapell
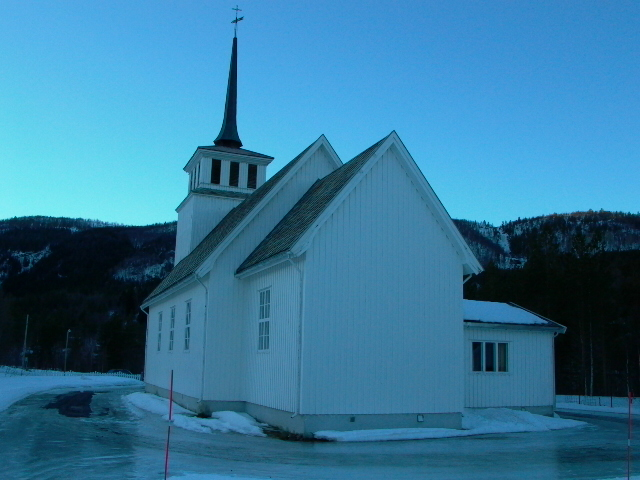
- View of the church
- Høyforsmoen Chapel
- 66.9096600°N 14.7492783°E
- Location: Beiarn Municipality, Nordland
- Country: Norway
- Denomination: Church of Norway
- Churchmanship: Evangelical Lutheran

History
- Status: Parish church
- Founded: 1960
- Consecrated: 14 Aug 1960

Architecture
- Functional status: Active
- Architect: Andreas W. Nygaard
- Architectural type: Long church
- Completed: 1960 (66 years ago)

Specifications
- Capacity: 200
- Materials: Wood

Administration
- Diocese: Sør-Hålogaland
- Deanery: Salten prosti
- Parish: Beiarn
- Norwegian Cultural Heritage Site
- Type: Church
- Status: Not protected
- ID: 84702

Høyforsmoen Chapel (Norwegian: Høyforsmoen kapell) is a parish church of the Church of Norway in Beiarn Municipality in Nordland county, Norway. It is located in the village of Høyforsmoen. It is one of the churches for the Beiarn parish which is part of the Salten prosti (deanery) in the Diocese of Sør-Hålogaland. The white, wooden church was built in a long church style in 1960 using plans drawn up by the architect Andreas W. Nygaard. The church seats about 200 people.

== History ==
In the mid-1800s, people in this part of Beiarn were pushing for their own local chapel. After much work, approval for a cemetery in this valley was finally given and it was built here in 1916. The new cemetery was consecrated on 11 January 1916. In 1960, the present chapel was built here using all volunteer labour. The new chapel was consecrated on 14 August 1960. The chapel was designed using the same plans as the Øvre Saltdal Church, just at a smaller scale.

== See also ==
- List of churches in Sør-Hålogaland
