= Beiar Valley =

Valley in Nordland, Norway

- Beiardalen (Norwegian)
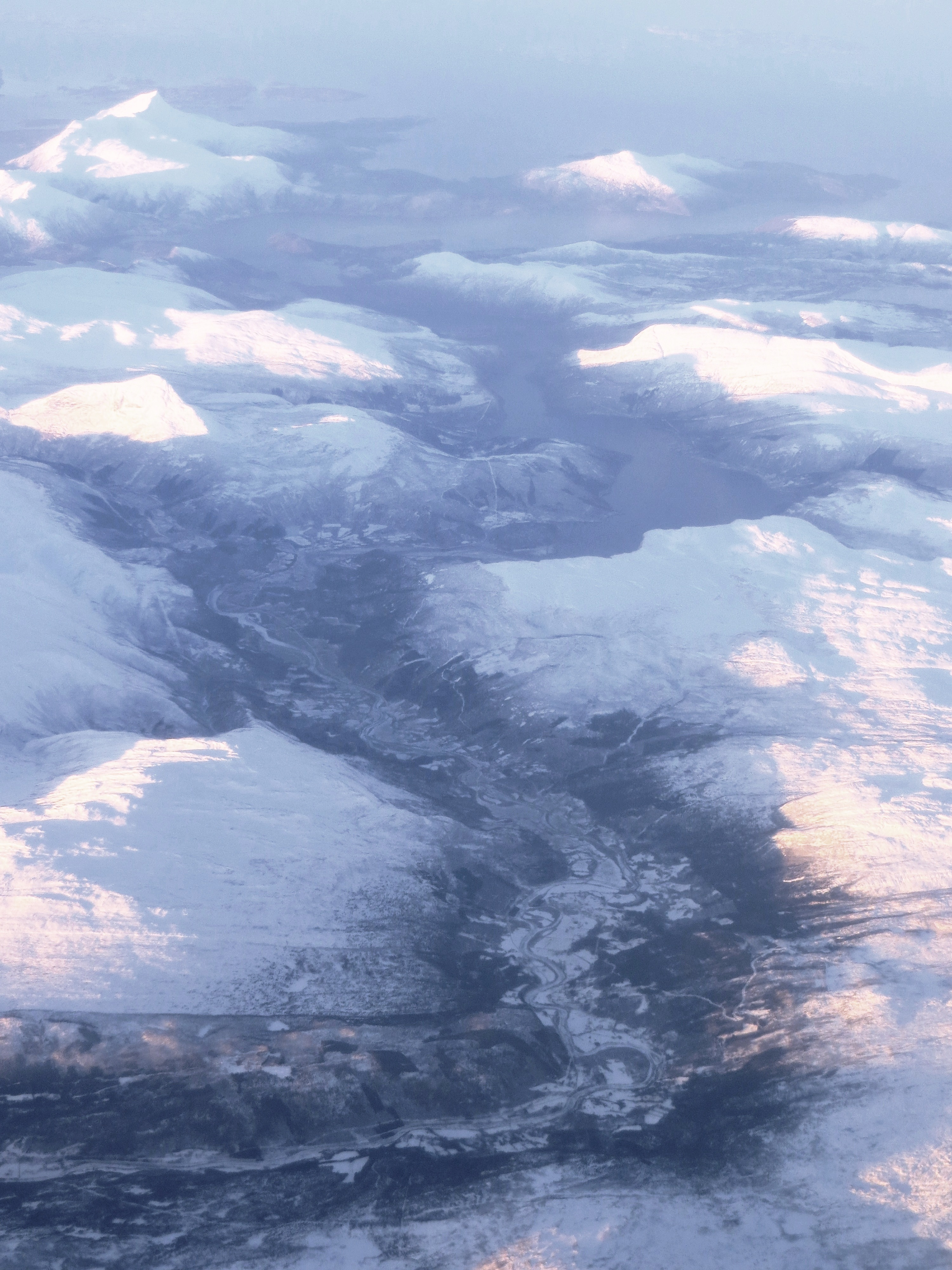
- Aerial photo of an east-west view of the Beiar Valley, with Beiar Fjord at the top
- Length: 60 kilometres (37 mi)

Geology
- Type: River valley

Geography
- Location: Nordland, Norway
- Population centers: Moldjord
- Coordinates: 66.73126°N 14.52302°E
- Rivers: Beiar River

Location
- Interactive map of the valley

The Beiar Valley (Norwegian: Beiardalen) is a valley in Beiarn Municipality in Nordland, Norway. It is about 60 kilometers (37 mi) long. Most of the residents of the municipality of Beiarn live in this valley.

The highest parts of the southern end of the valley are located within Saltfjellet–Svartisen National Park. The Beiar River flows through the valley before emptying into the Beiar Fjord at the north end of the valley.
