= Moldjord =

Village in Nordland, Norway

Moldjord Moldjorda
- Village
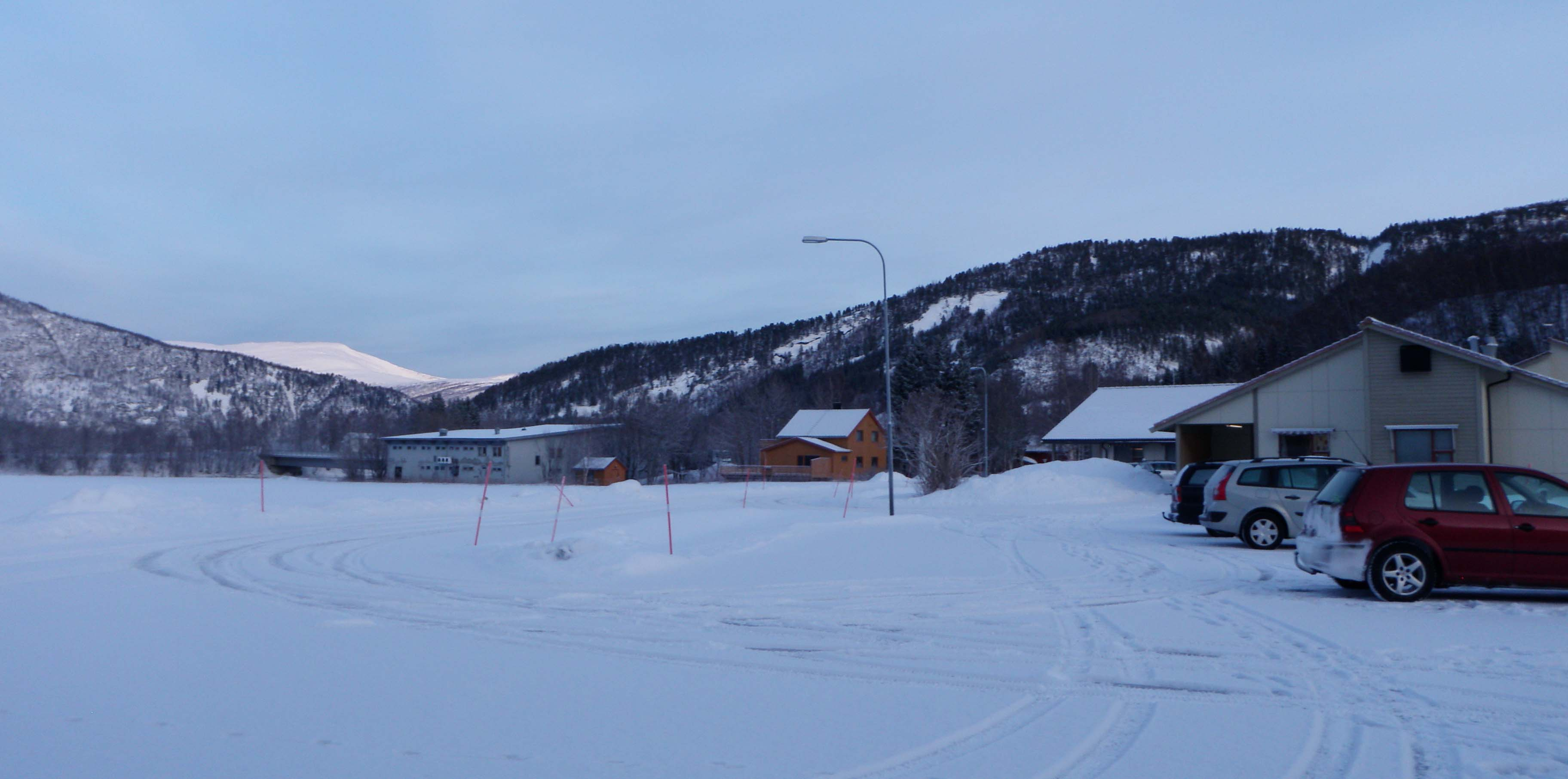
- View of the village
- Interactive map of Moldjord
- Location within Nordland Location within Norway
- Coordinates: 67.0067°N 14.5764°E
- Country: Norway
- Region: Northern Norway
- County: Nordland
- District: Salten
- Municipality: Beiarn Municipality
- Elevation: 11 m (36 ft)
- Time zone: UTC+01:00 (CET)
  - Summer (DST): UTC+02:00 (CEST)
- Post Code: 8110 Moldjord

Moldjord is the administrative centre of Beiarn Municipality in Nordland county, Norway. The village is located along the Beiar River, about 5 kilometres (3.1 mi) south of the river's mouth at the Beiar Fjord. The village is home to the Beiarn Church, the main church for the municipality. The village has about 150 residents (in 2016).

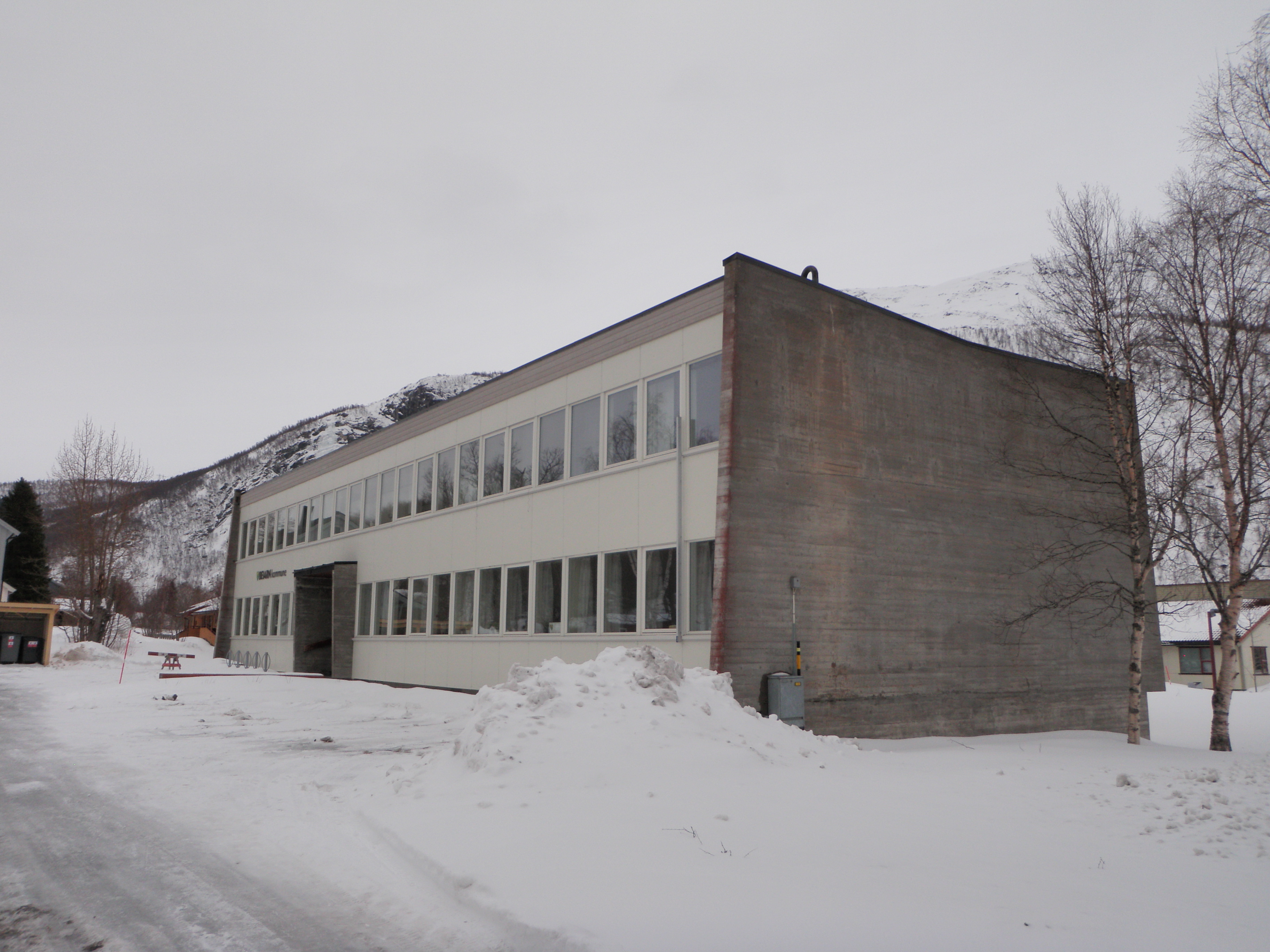
The town hall in Moldjord

== Climate ==
Climate type is dominated by the winter season, a long, bitterly cold period with short, clear days, relatively little precipitation mostly in the form of snow, and low humidity. The Köppen Climate Classification subtype for this climate is "Dfc" (Continental Subarctic Climate).
