= Beiarelva =

River in Nordland, Norway

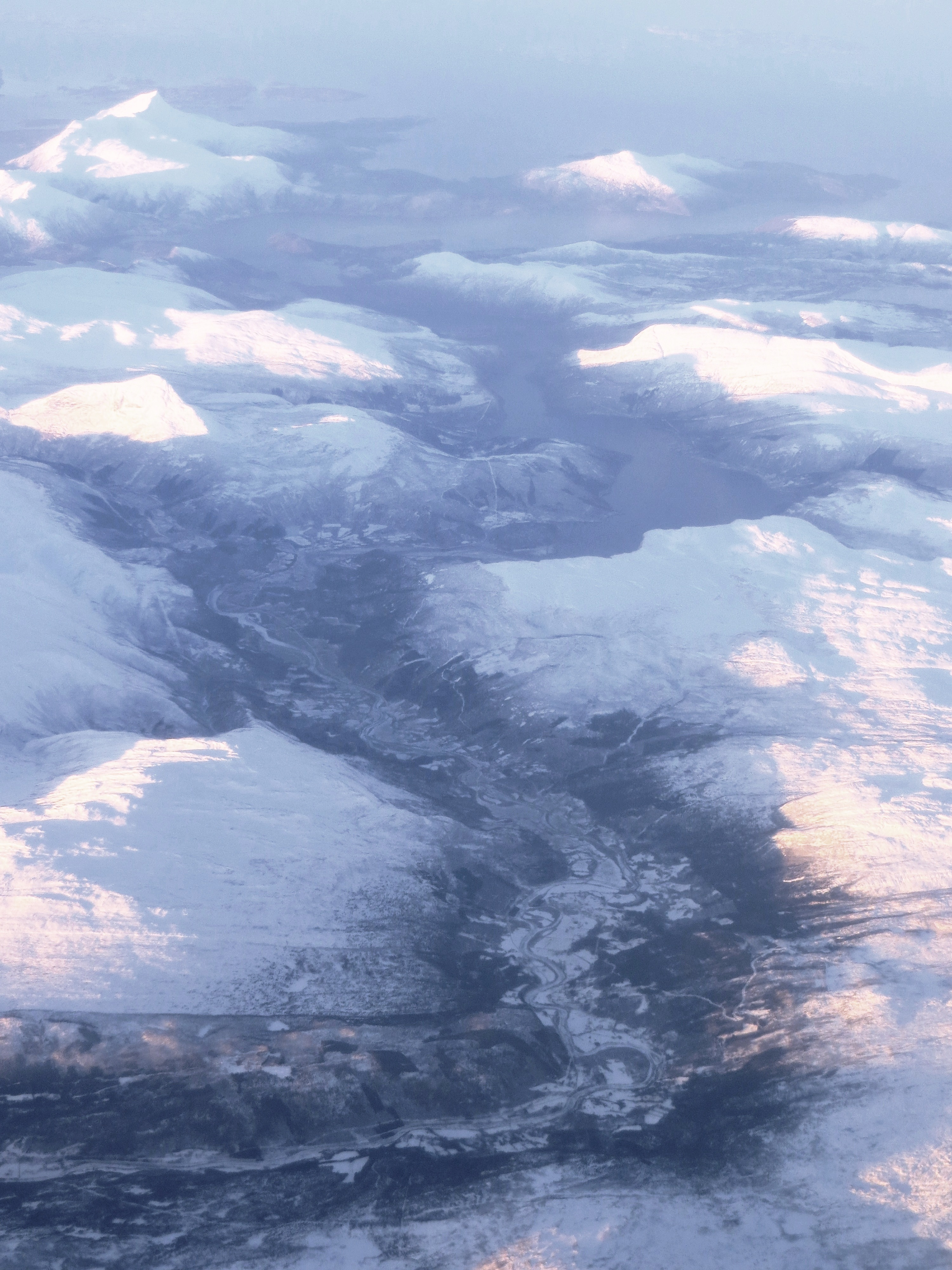
- The Beiarelva as seen from the air in the Beiar Valley

Location
- Country: Norway
- County: Nordland
- Municipality: Beiarn Municipality

Physical characteristics
- Source: Svartisen
  - location: Nordland, Norway
  - coordinates: 66.68310°N 14.42059°E
  - elevation: 900 metres (3,000 ft)
- Mouth: Beiar Fjord
  - location: Beiarn Municipality, Norway
  - coordinates: 67.03420°N 14.58452°E
  - elevation: 0 metres (0 ft)
- Length: 54 km (34 mi)
- Basin size: 1,052 km^{2} (406 sq mi)

The Beiarelva is a river in Beiarn Municipality in Nordland, Norway. The river begins at the Svartisen glacier high in the mountains near the municipal borders of Beiarn Municipality, Meløy Municipality, and Rana Municipality inside the Saltfjellet-Svartisen National Park. The river then flows north and then west through the Beiar Valley to the head of Beiar Fjord. It has a length of about 54 kilometers (34 mi) and a drainage area of 1,052 square kilometers (406 sq mi), and is among the largest rivers in Nordland county.
