= Svartisen =

Glaciers in Nordland, Norway

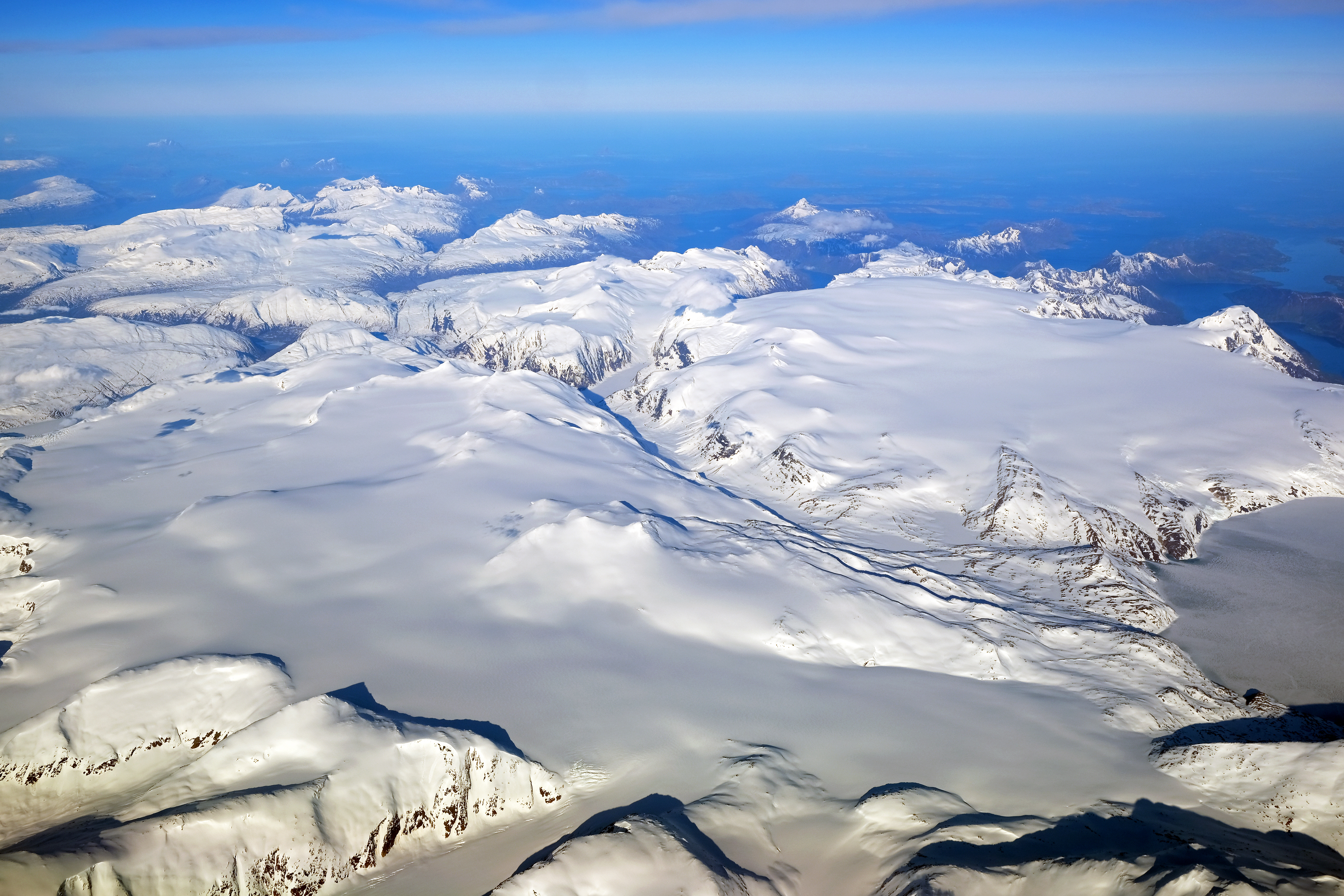
- Aerial view of the glaciers

- Location within Nordland Location within Norway
- Location: Nordland, Norway
- Coordinates: 66°38′N 14°00′E
- Area: 369 km^{2} (142 sq mi)

Svartisen is a collective term for two glaciers located in Nordland county in northern Norway. It is part of Saltfjellet-Svartisen National Park, located in the Saltfjell mountain range. The glaciers are located in the municipalities of Beiarn, Meløy, Rana, and Rødøy. Svartisen consists of two separate glaciers that are separated by the 1-kilometre (0.62 mi) long Vesterdalen valley. The two glaciers are:

- Vestisen or Vestre Svartisen ("western Svartisen") has an area of 221 square kilometres (85 sq mi) which makes it the second largest glacier on the Norwegian mainland after the Jostedalsbreen glacier. (There are larger glaciers on Svalbard.)
- Østisen or Østre Svartisen ("eastern Svartisen") has an area of 148 square kilometres (57 sq mi) which makes it the country's fourth largest glacier.

There are also a number of minor glaciers in the area surrounding Svartisen, such as Glombreen in the northern part of Meløy Municipality, and Simlebreen in Beiarn Municipality. One of the outlet glaciers of Svartisen, Engabreen ends at the lowest point of any glacier on the European mainland, at 20 metres (66 ft) above sea level (in 2007). The Norwegian Water Resources and Energy Directorate has monitored the glacier mass balance of the glacier since 1970 and operates a sub-glacial laboratory beneath Engabreen.

Water from the glacier is collected and used for hydropower production via runoff into the streams and lakes and through intakes bored beneath Engabreen.

== Name ==
The first element is svart which means 'swart' or 'black' and the last element is the finite form of is meaning 'ice' or 'glacier'. The old ice of the glacier is considerably darker than fresh ice and newfallen snow.

== Western Svartisen ==
The western Svartisen ice cap is a glacier occupying 201 square kilometres (78 sq mi) of the coastal area of central Norway, just inside the Arctic Circle. Most of the glacier is around 1000 metres above sea level on a high plateau. The ice cap owes its existence to the high snowfall rates in the region, rather than the cold temperatures, similar to other glaciers close by such as the Jostedalsbreen glacier. The surface on the top of the plateau feeds many outlet glaciers, including the Engabreen glacier. The status of the glacier is unknown, although some of the outlet glaciers are advancing and gaining ice mass.

== Media gallery ==
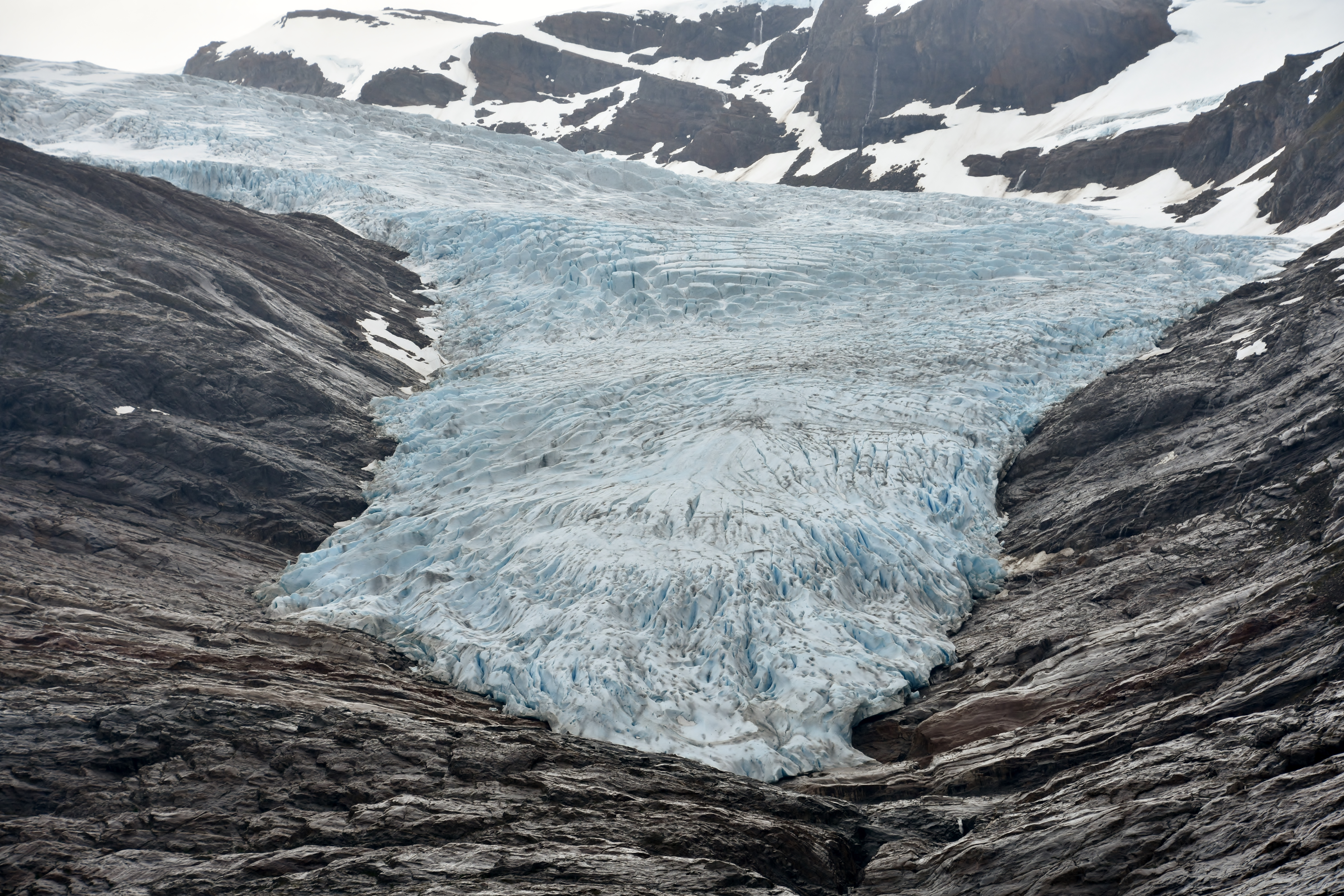
Engabreen, an outlet glacier of Svartisen

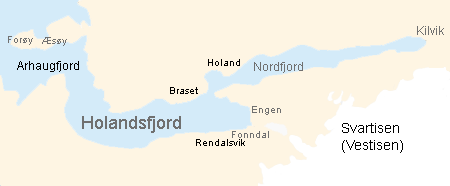
Holandsfjord, where the glacier gets closer to the sea than any other glacier in Europe (apart from Svalbard).

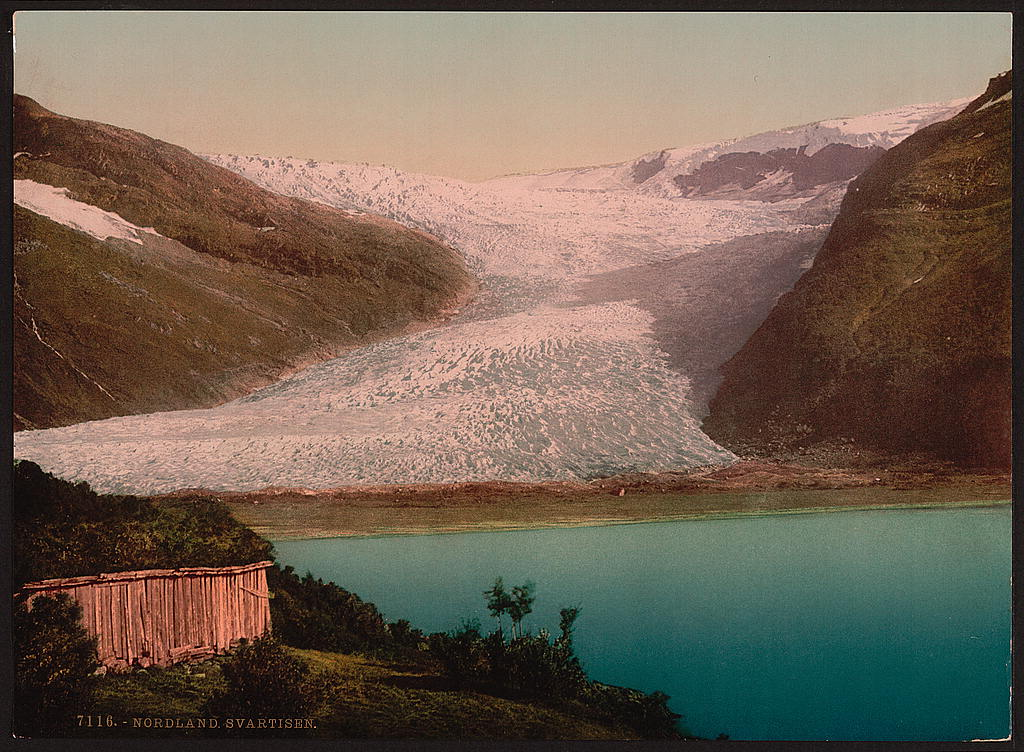
Glacier heading towards the water

== See also ==
- List of glaciers in Norway
