= Beiar Fjord =

Fjord in Beiarn and Gildeskål, Norway

- Beiarfjorden (Norwegian); Beiaren (Norwegian)
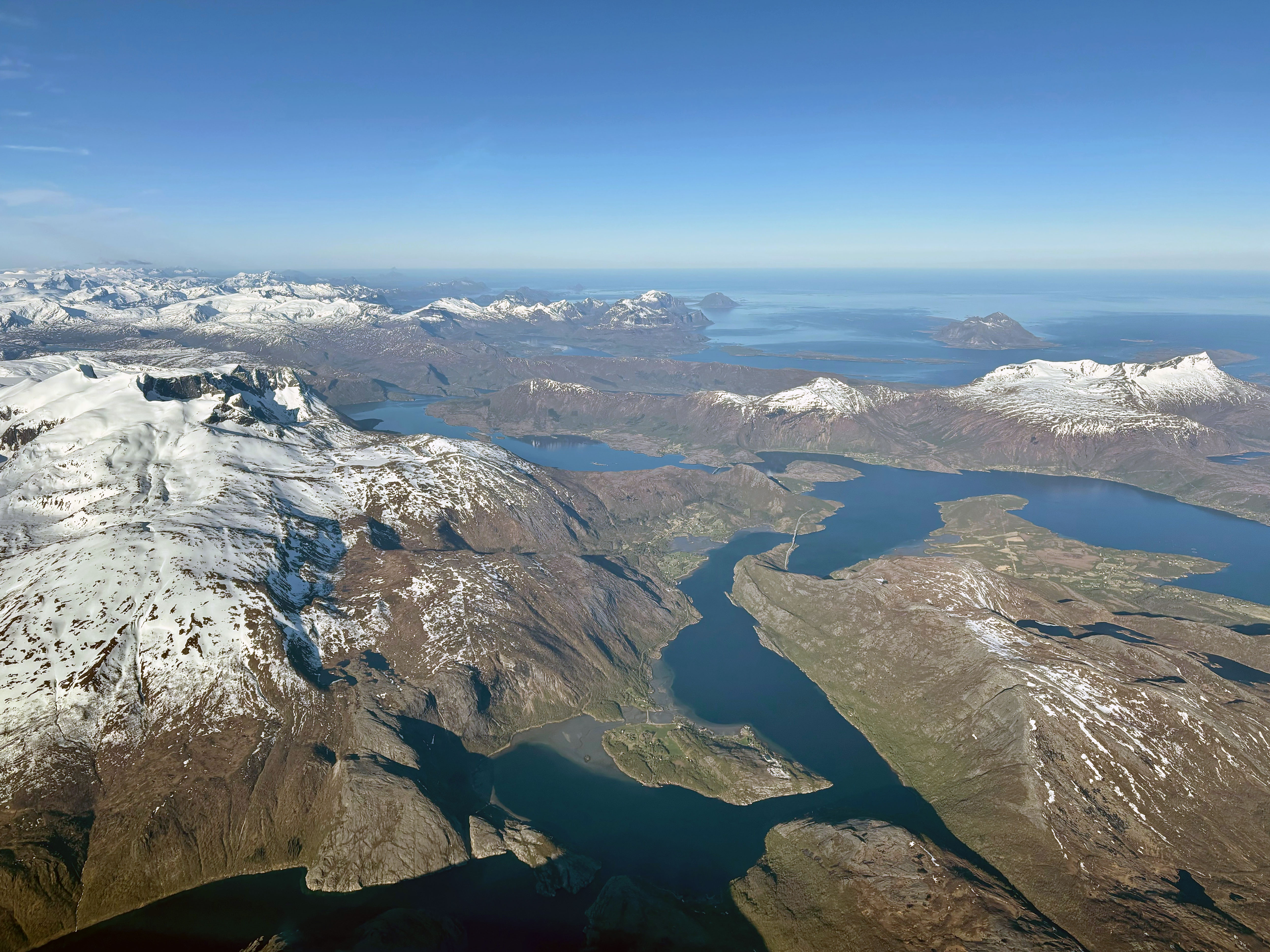
- Aerial photo of the Beiar Fjord
- Interactive map of the fjord
- Location: Nordland county, Norway
- Coordinates: 67.0693°N 14.5328°E
- Type: Fjord
- Basin countries: Norway
- Max. length: 20 kilometres (12 mi)

Beiar Fjord (Norwegian: Beiarfjorden) is a fjord in Nordland, Norway. The fjord lies mostly within Beiarn Municipality, but the westernmost part of the fjord lies in Gildeskål Municipality. It has a length of about 20 kilometers (12 mi). The Norwegian County Road 17 crosses the fjord near the mouth via the Kjellingstraumen Bridge. The fjord ranges from 80 metres (260 ft) to 2 kilometres (1.2 mi) wide throughout its course.

The 54-kilometer (34 mi) Beiar River debouches into the head of Beiar Fjord. The Beiar Fjord splits into several basins at some of the narrow sounds among which the innermost one is the largest. This area is a beautiful spot known to local boaters and tourists.

== See also ==
- List of Norwegian fjords
