= Besseling =

Besseling is a surname. Notable people with the surname include:

- Alice Besseling (1944–2014), Dutch politician
- J.F. Besseling (1928–2015), Dutch professor
- Peter Besseling (born 1970), Australian politician
- Wil Besseling (born 1985), Dutch golfer
