= Drechterland =

- Municipality
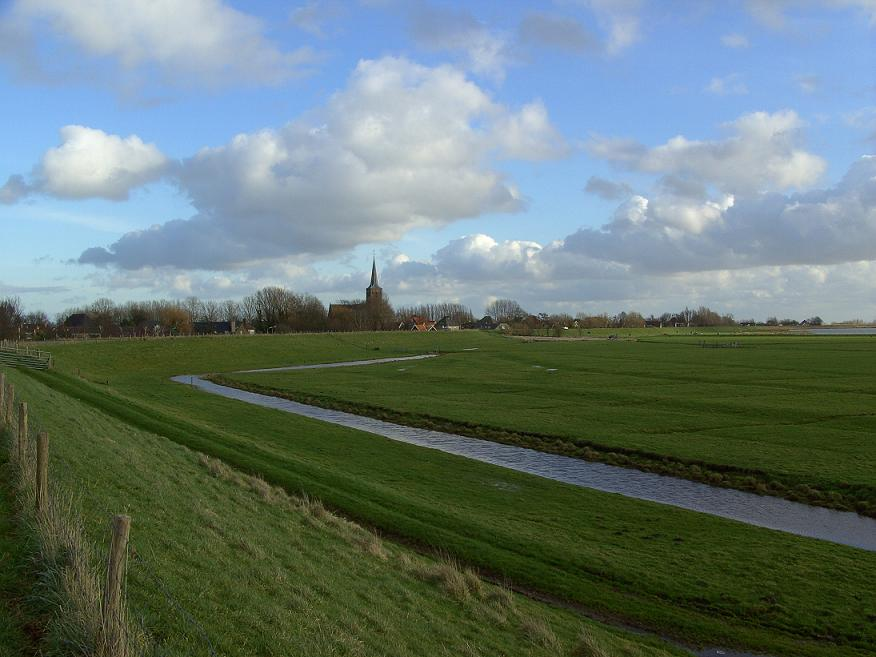
- Town centre of Schellinkhout

- Flag Coat of arms

- Location in North Holland
- Coordinates: 52°42′N 5°11′E
- Country: Netherlands
- Province: North Holland
- Established: 1 January 1979

Government
  - Body: Municipal council
  - Mayor: Michiel Pijl (CDA)

Area
  - Total: 80.59 km^{2} (31.12 sq mi)
  - Land: 59.89 km^{2} (23.12 sq mi)
  - Water: 20.70 km^{2} (7.99 sq mi)
- Elevation: −1 m (−3.3 ft)

Population (January 2021)
  - Total: 19,838
  - Density: 331/km^{2} (860/sq mi)
- Time zone: UTC+1 (CET)
  - Summer (DST): UTC+2 (CEST)
- Postcode: 1606–1609, 1616–1617, 1696–1697
- Area code: 0228, 0229
- Website: www.drechterland.nl

Drechterland (Dutch pronunciation: [ˈdrɛxtərlɑnt]) is a municipality in the Netherlands, in the province of North Holland and the region of West-Frisia. The municipality was formed in 1979, in a merger of the former municipalities of Hoogkarspel, Westwoud and Oosterblokker. Its original name, Bangert, was changed to "Drechterland" in 1980. In 2006, the former municipality of Venhuizen was added to Drechterland.

== Population centres ==
The municipality of Drechterland consists of the following towns, villages and districts:

- Hem
- Hoogkarspel
- Oosterblokker
- Oosterleek
- Oosterwijzend
- Schellinkhout
- Venhuizen
- Westerwijzend
- Westwoud
- Wijdenes

=== Topography ===
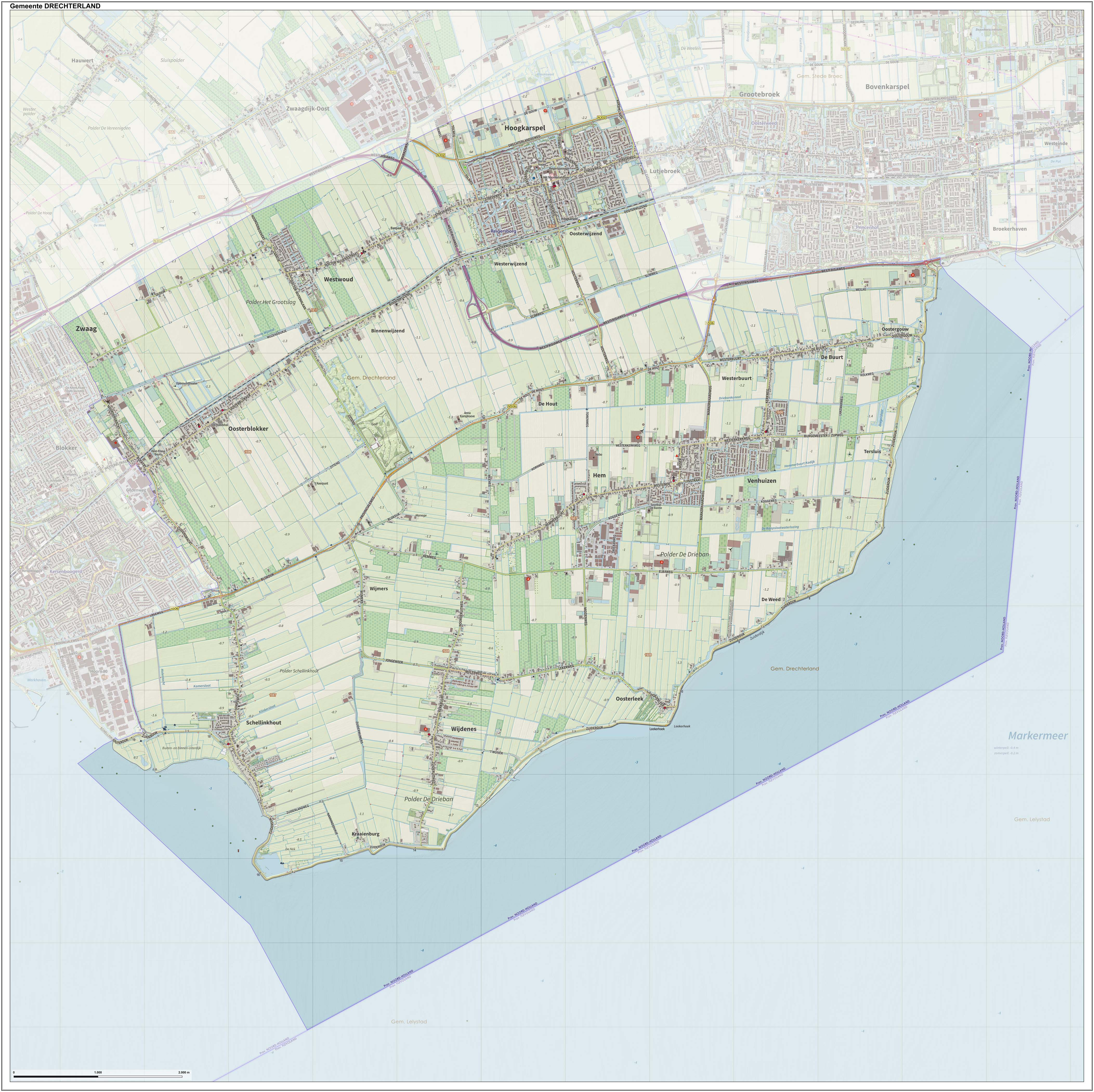

Map of the municipality of Drechterland, June 2015

== Local government ==
The municipal council of Drechterland consists of 17 seats, which after the 2026 municipal election divided as follows:

- Christian Democratic Appeal (CDA) – 5 seats
- Senior Party, Drechterland – 4 seats
- People's Party for Freedom & Democracy (VVD) – 4 seats
- Progressive Drechterland – 3 seats
- Municipal interests, Drechterland – 3 seats

== Notable people ==
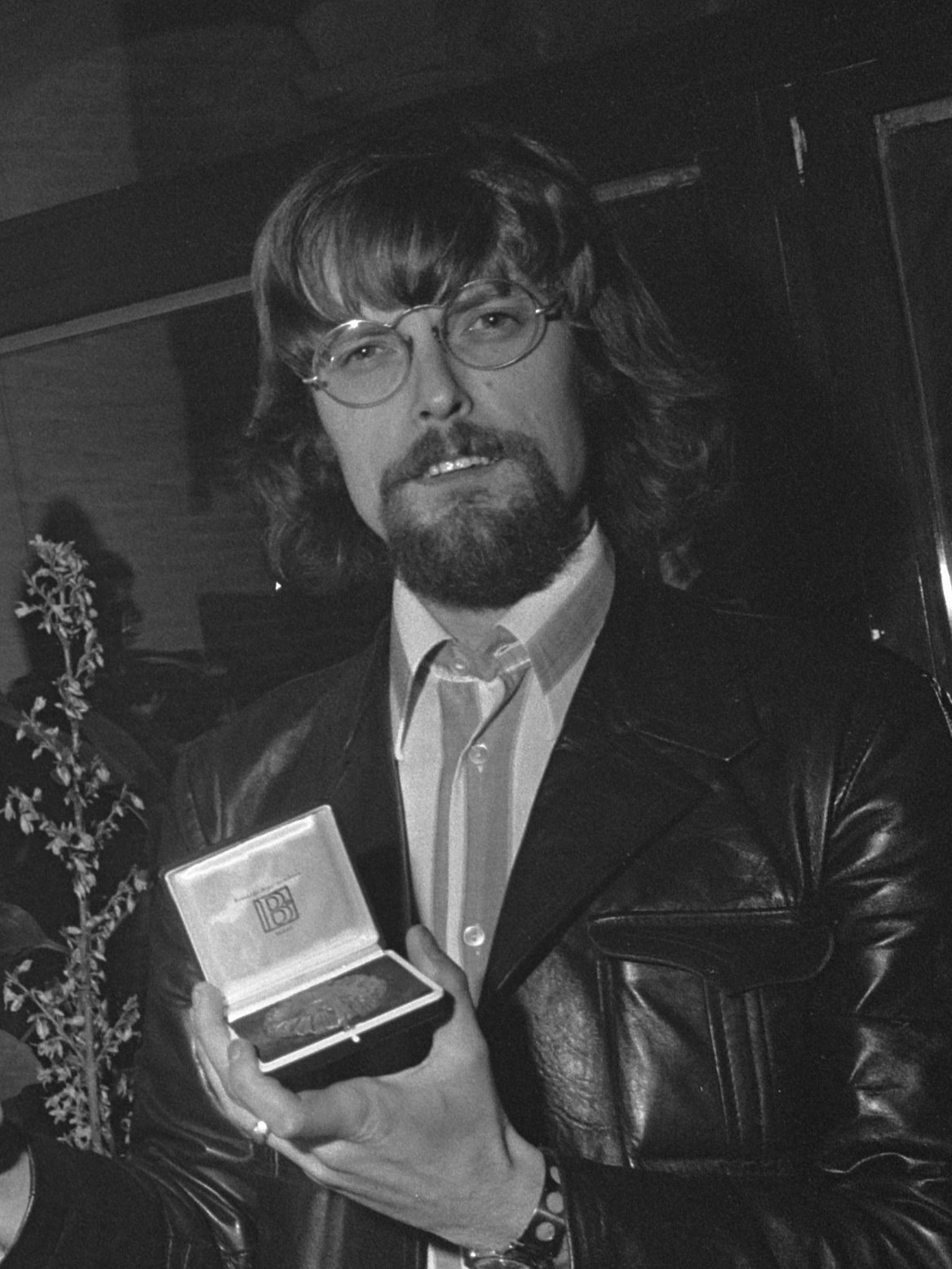
Vincent Mentzel, 1973

- Jan Jacobszoon May van Schellinkhout (17th c., born in Schellinkhout) a seafarer and explorer, eponym of Jan Mayen
- Cornelis Jacobsen Mey (17th c., born in Schellinkhout) an explorer, captain and fur trader
- Wilhelmus Nuyens (1823 in Avenhorn – 1894) a historian.
- Vincent Mentzel (born 1945 Hoogkarspel) a newspaper photographer, embraces photorealism

=== Sport ===
- Hendrik Offerhaus (1875 in Venhuizen – 1953) a rower and bronze medallist in the 1900 Summer Olympics
- Mathieu Boots (born 1975 in Venhuizen) a retired football player with over 250 club caps
- Thomas Koenis (born 1989 in Hoogkarspel) a professional basketball player
- Erik Schouten (born 1991 in Westwoud) a professional footballer with 140 caps with FC Volendam

== Gallery ==
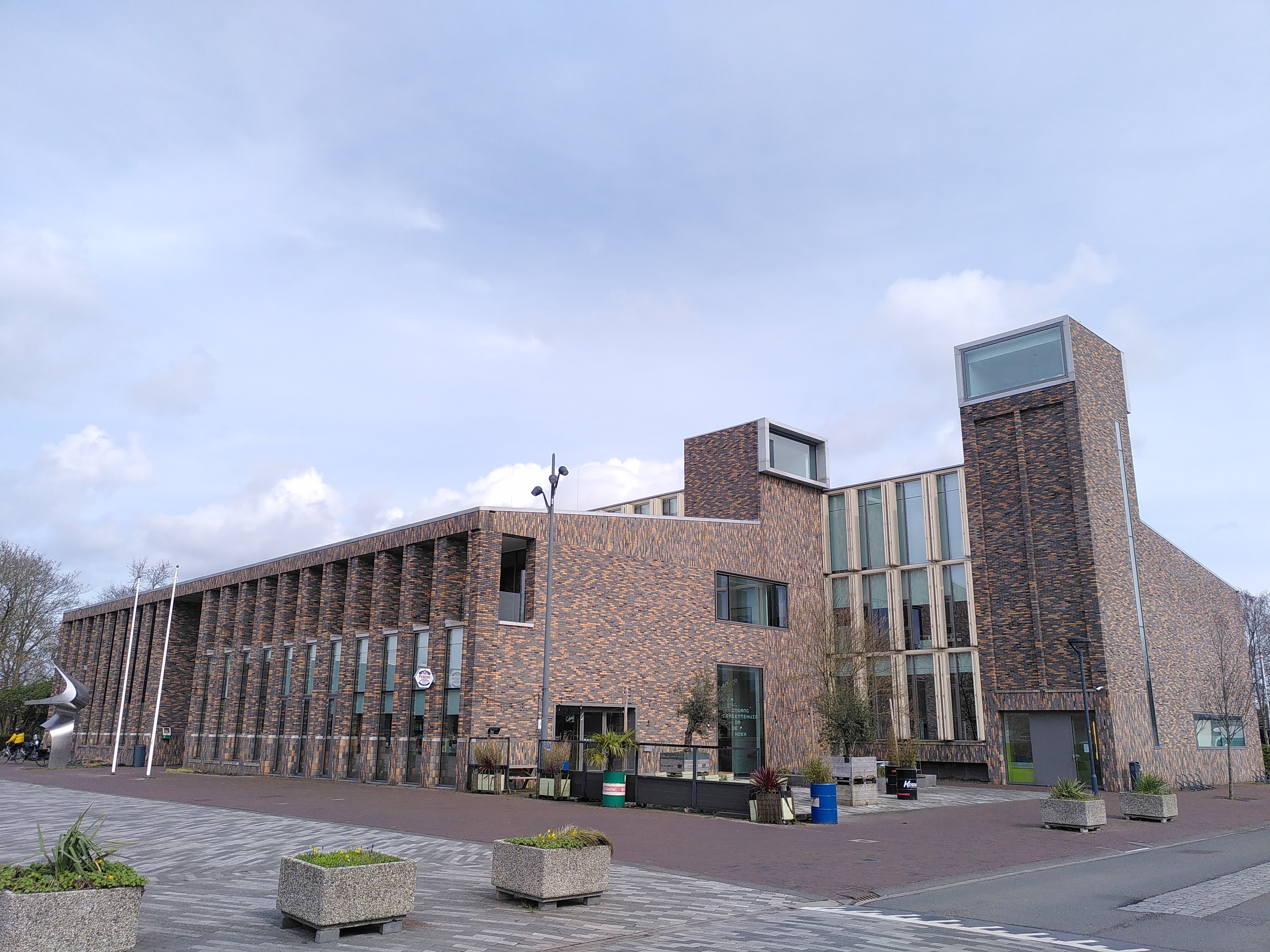
The town hall of Drechterland, in Hoogkarspel.

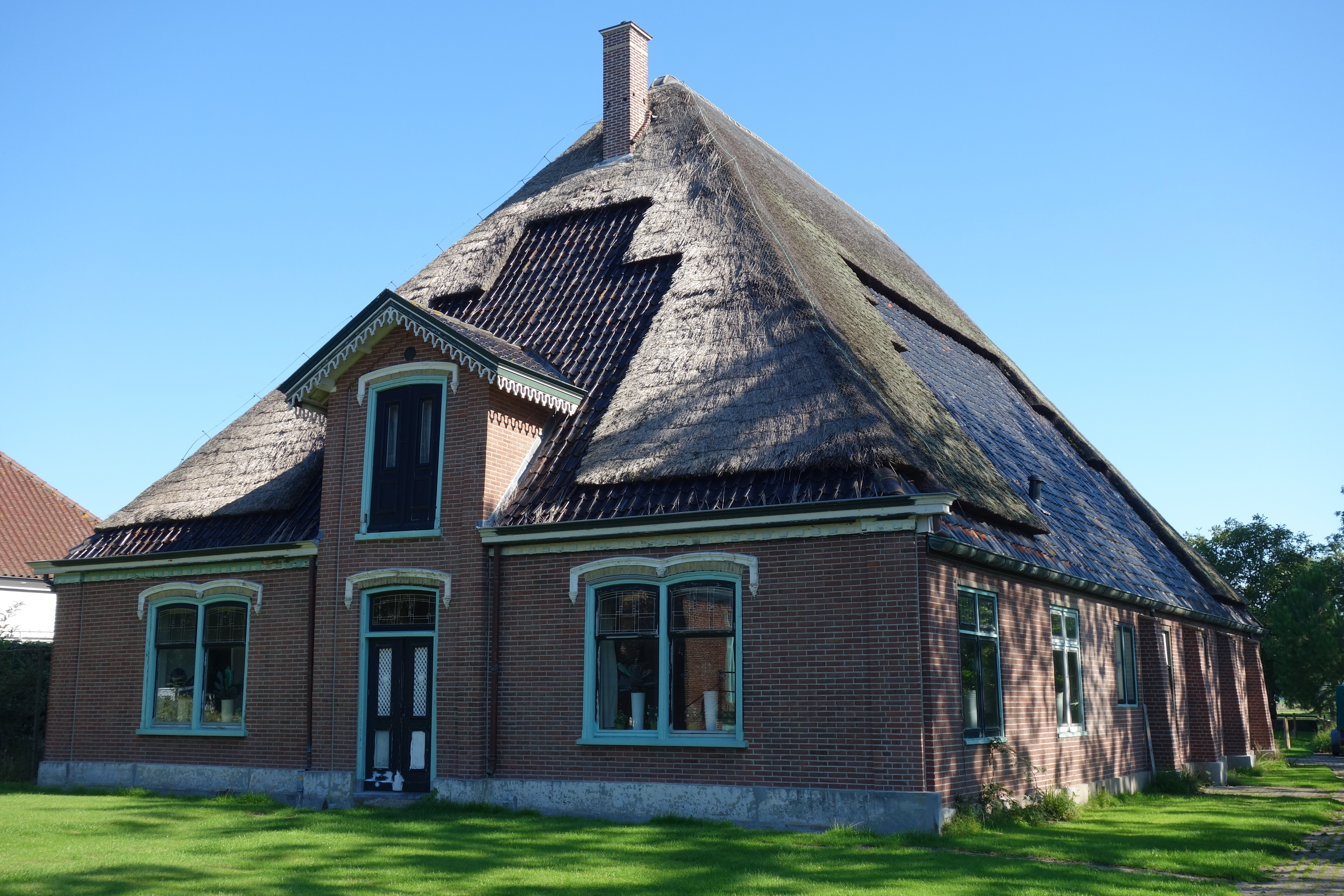
Dorpsweg, Schellinkhout

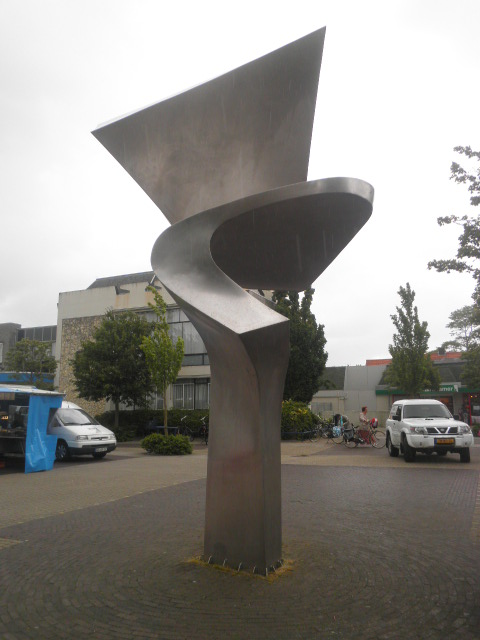
Sculpture on the Raadhuisplein, Hoogkarspel

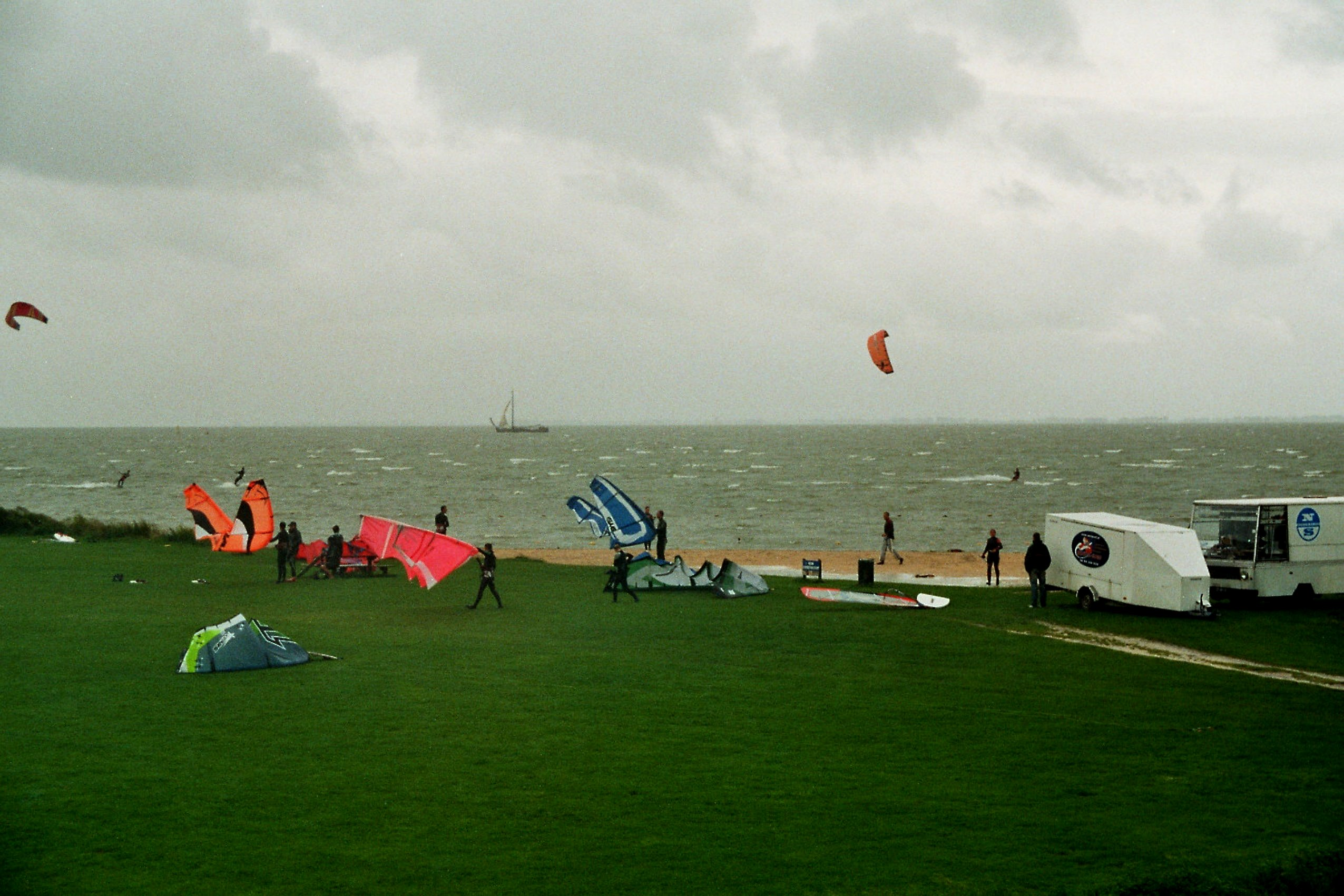
Schellinkhout, the beach

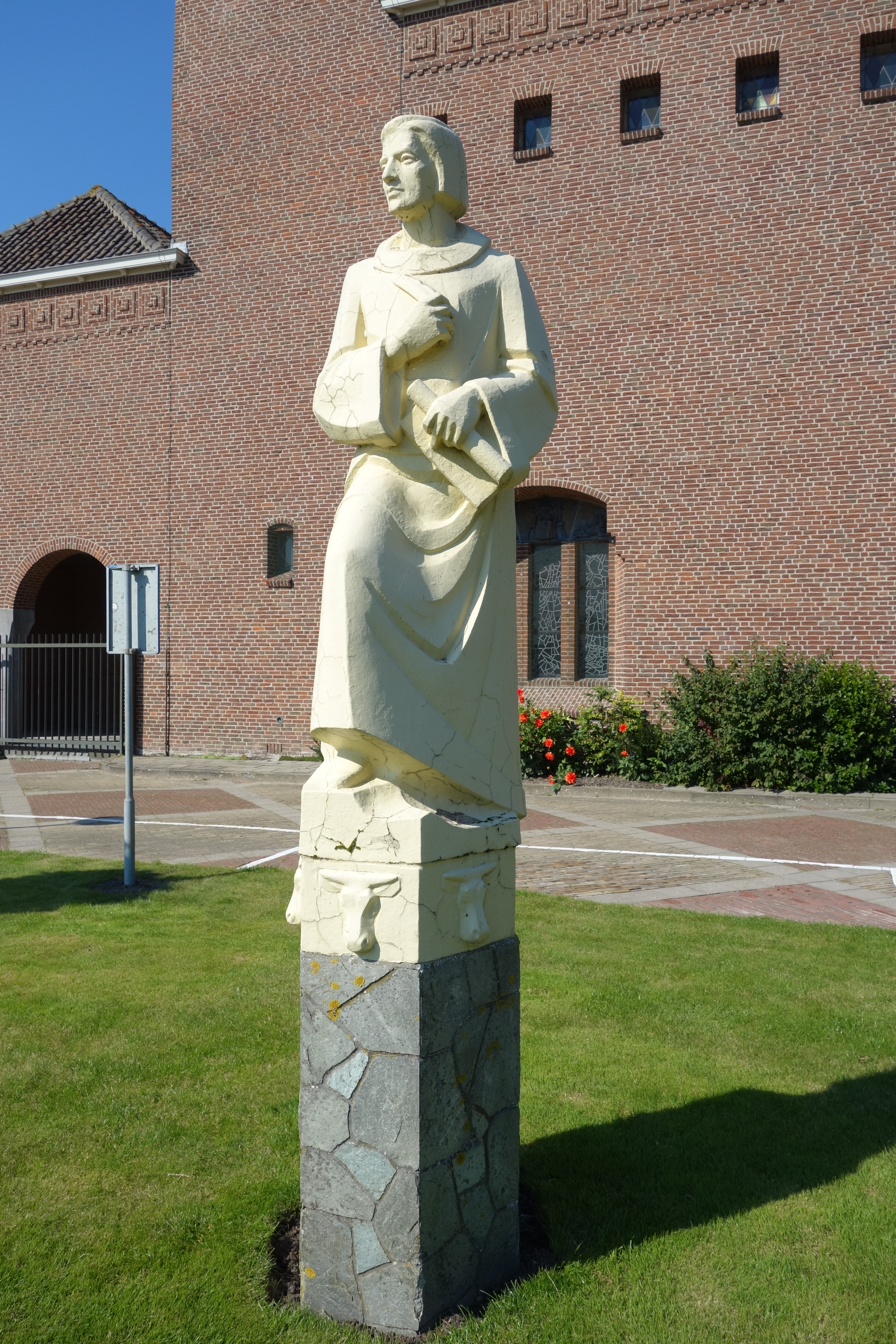
Saint Luke, Venhuizen

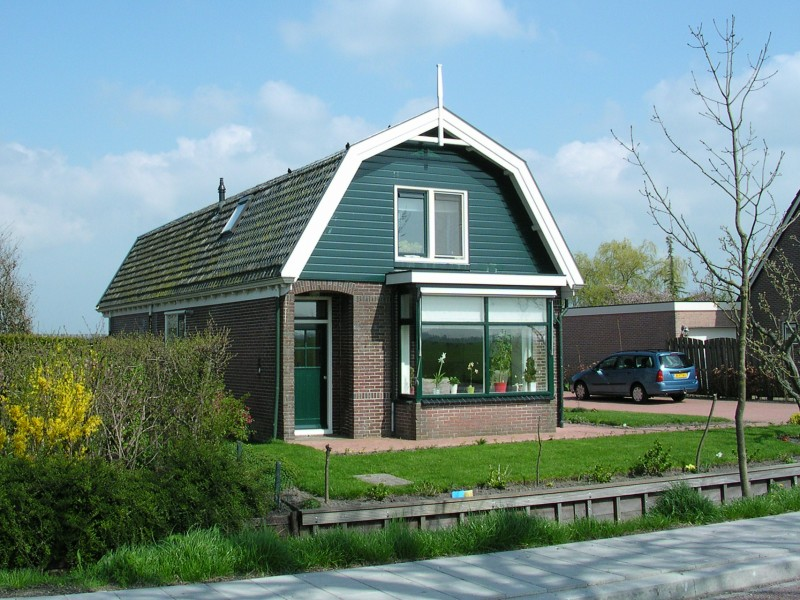
Zittend
