= Schellinkhout =

- Village
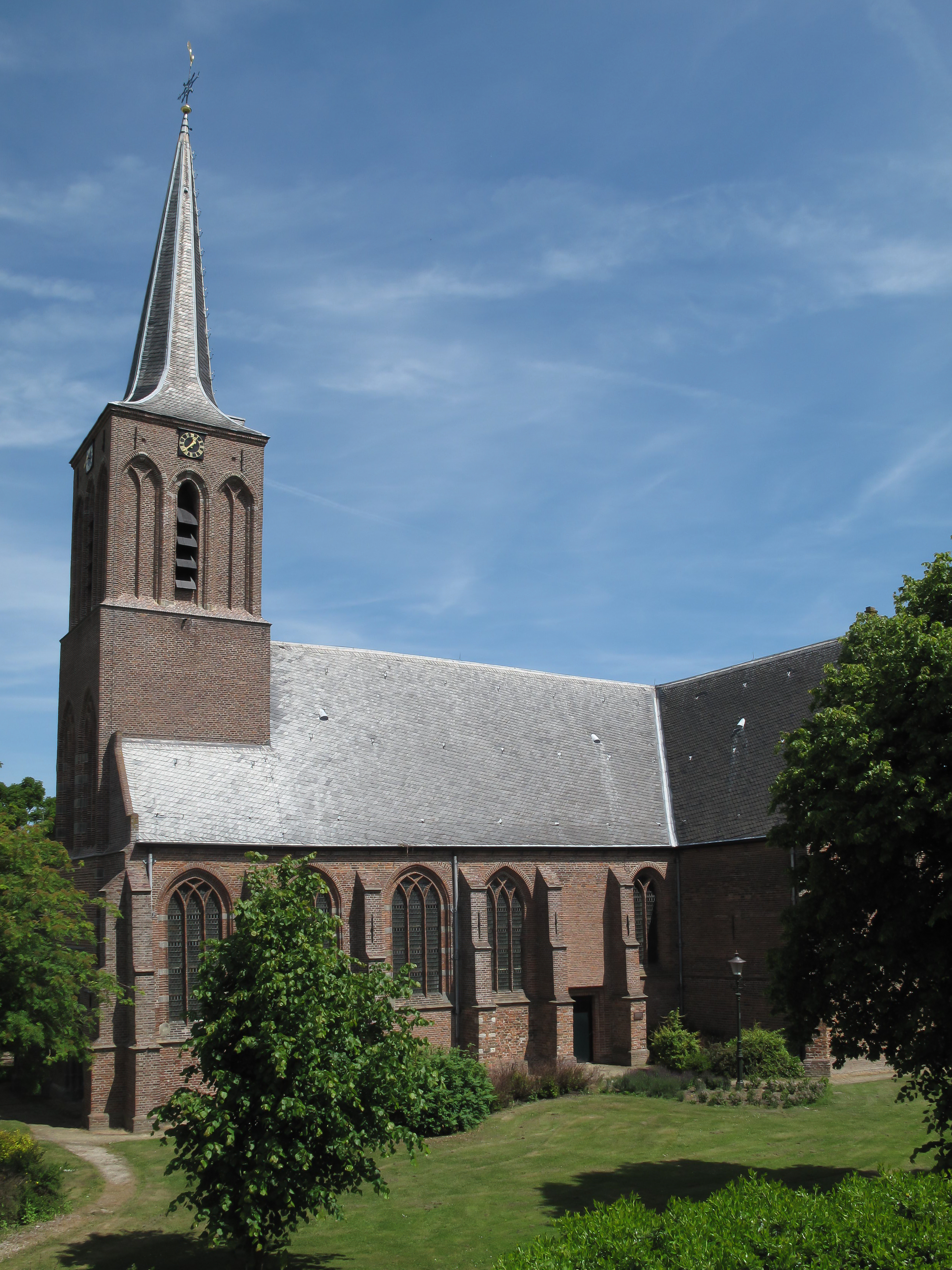
- St Martinus Church

- Coat of arms

- Location in the Netherlands Location in the province of North Holland in the Netherlands
- Coordinates: 52.6344°N 5.1206°E
- Country: Netherlands
- Province: North Holland
- Municipality: Drechterland

Area
  - Total: 6.06 km^{2} (2.34 sq mi)
- Elevation: −0.9 m (−3.0 ft)

Population (2025)
  - Total: 855
  - Density: 141/km^{2} (365/sq mi)
- Time zone: UTC+1 (CET)
  - Summer (DST): UTC+2 (CEST)
- Postal code: 1697
- Dialing code: 0229

Schellinkhout (West Frisian: Skellinkhout) is a village located in the municipality of Drechterland, North Holland at the border of the IJsselmeer, about 3 km southeast of Hoorn in West-Frisia. It received city rights in 1402, among other (groupings of) villages in the West Frisian countryside, and thus never developed into a real city.

== History ==
The city was first mentioned around 1312 as Scellinchout, and is a combination of "delicious forest" and "border". Schellinkhout developed in the 12th century as a peat excavation settlement. In 1282, a battle took place between Holland commanded by Floris V, Count of Holland and the army of West Friesland. The former Zuiderzee (nowadays: IJsselmeer) kept taking land and the village moved to the east leaving the church close to the sea. In 1402, it was awarded city rights by Albert I, Count of Holland. This mainly meant that Schellinkhout had its own judicial district. In 1811 the old system was replaced by a new (French-styled) judicial system and Schellinkhout became its own municipality, except for the years 1812 to 1816 when Wijdenes and Oosterleek were merged with Schellinkhout.

The Dutch Reformed church has 14th century elements. The tower was built in the early 16th century. The polder mill De Grote Molen was built between 1603 and 1638. In 1900, a motor was added, and by 1914, the pumping station had made the wind mill obsolete. Between 1979 and 1980, it was restored and is occasionally in service. Unlike most polder mills, it does not pump the water over the dike, but uses a pipe underneath the dike.

Schellinkhout was home to 497 people in 1840. It was a separate municipality until 1970, when it was merged with Venhuizen. In 2006, it became part of the municipality of Drechterland.

The meandering main road (Dorpsweg) counts 33 corners

== Notable people ==
- Jan Jacobszoon May van Schellinkhout a Dutch seafarer and explorer, eponym of Jan Mayen
- Cornelis Jacobsen Mey a Dutch explorer, captain and fur trader

== Gallery ==
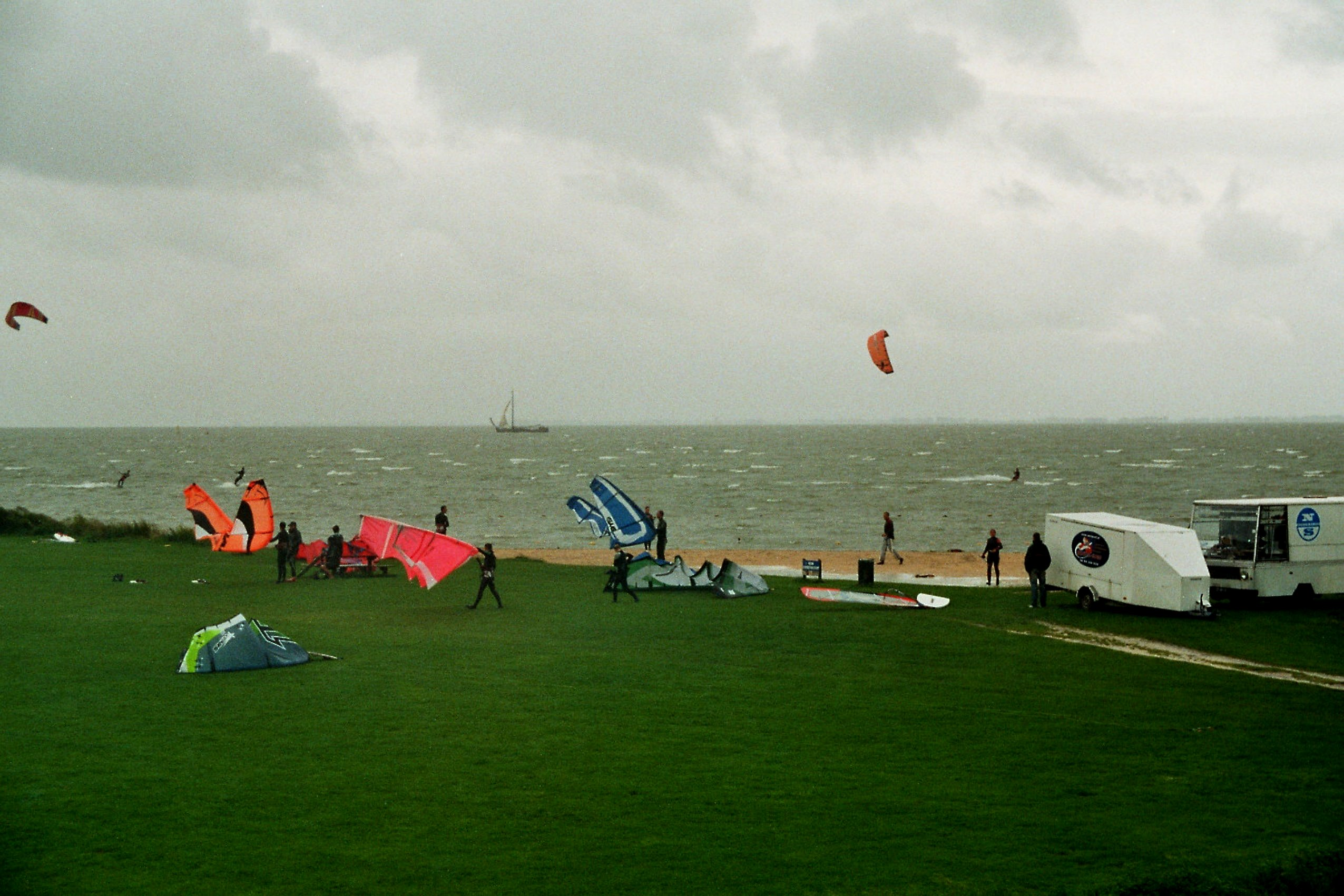
The beach of Schellinkhout

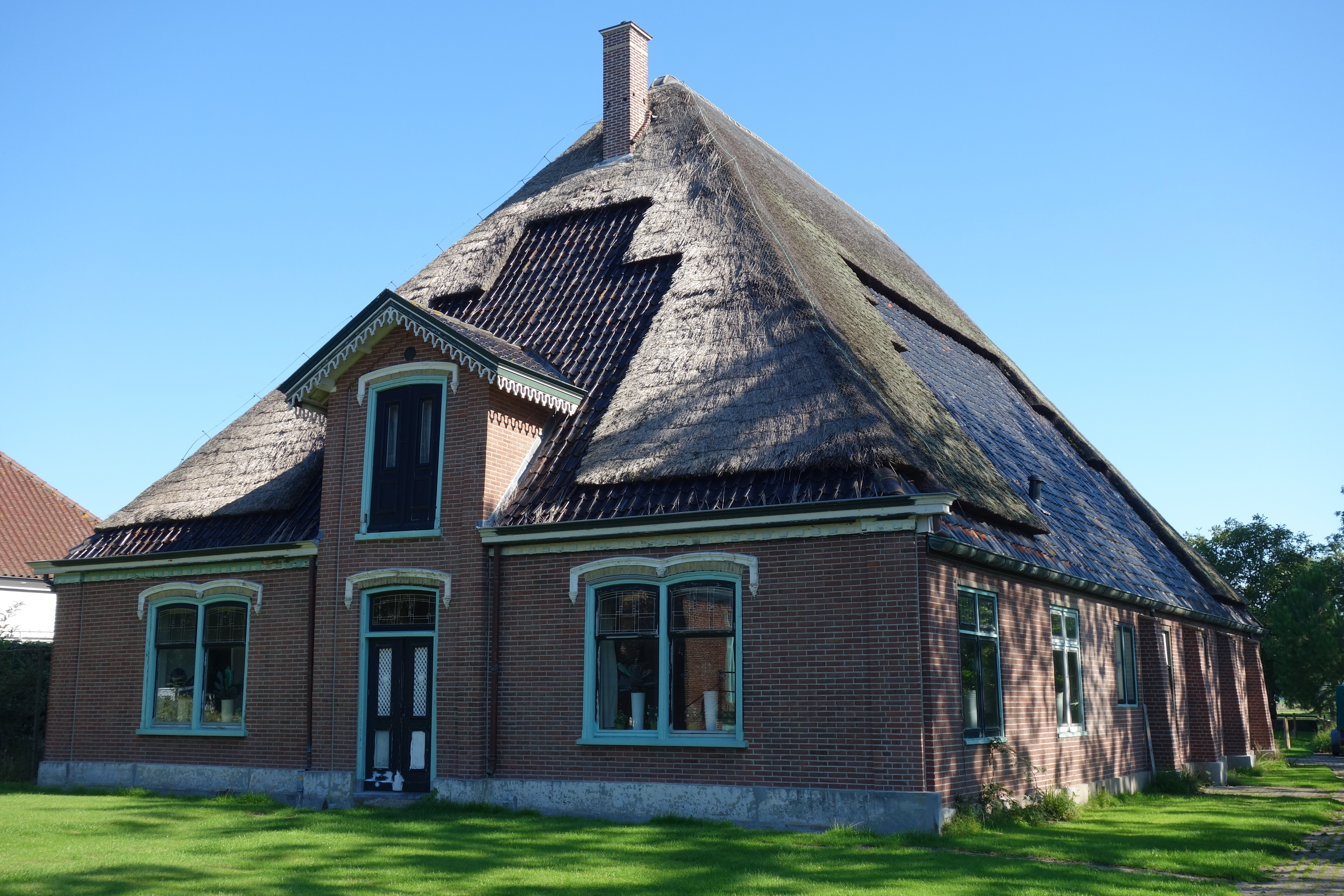
Farm in Schellinkhout

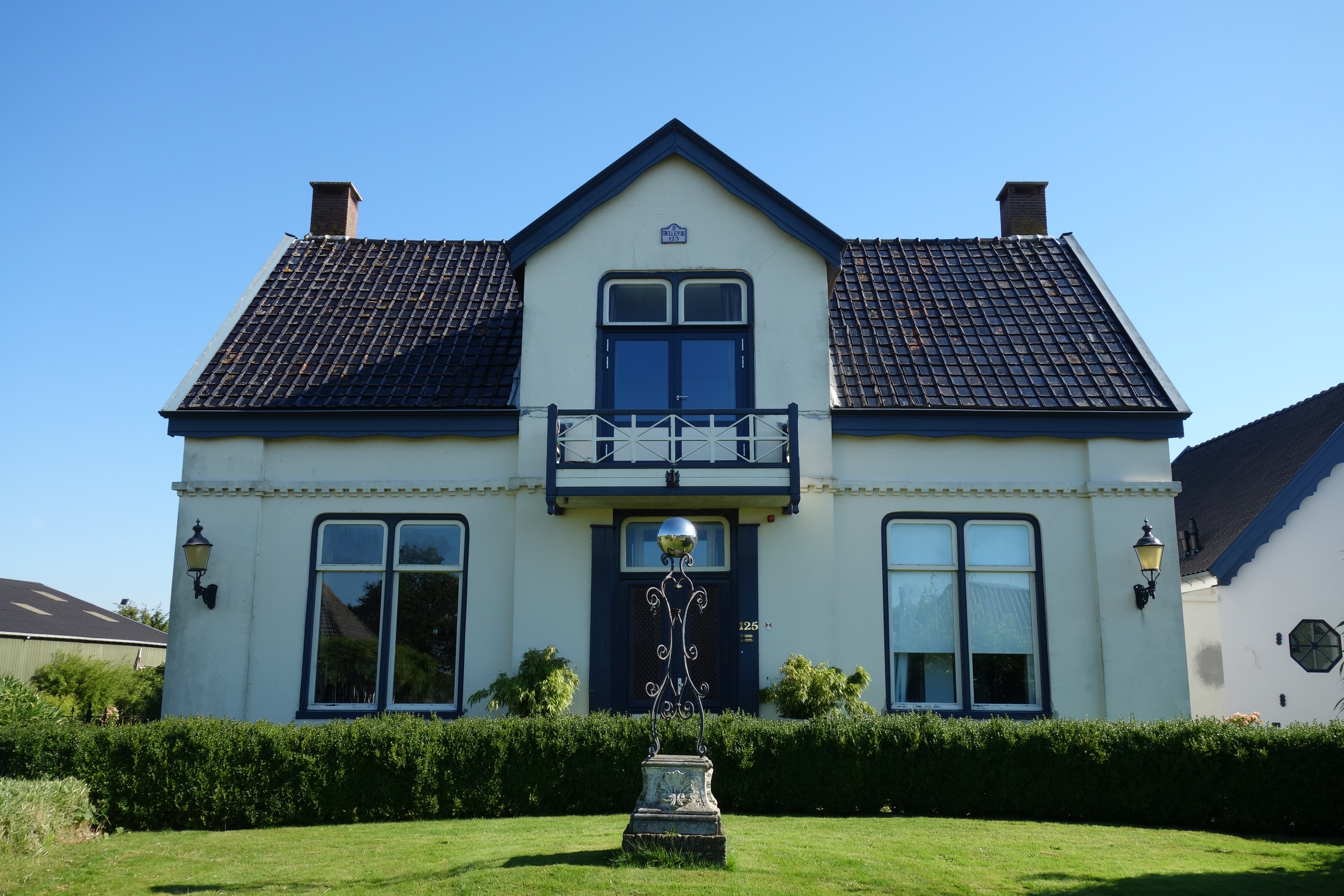
House in Schellinkhout

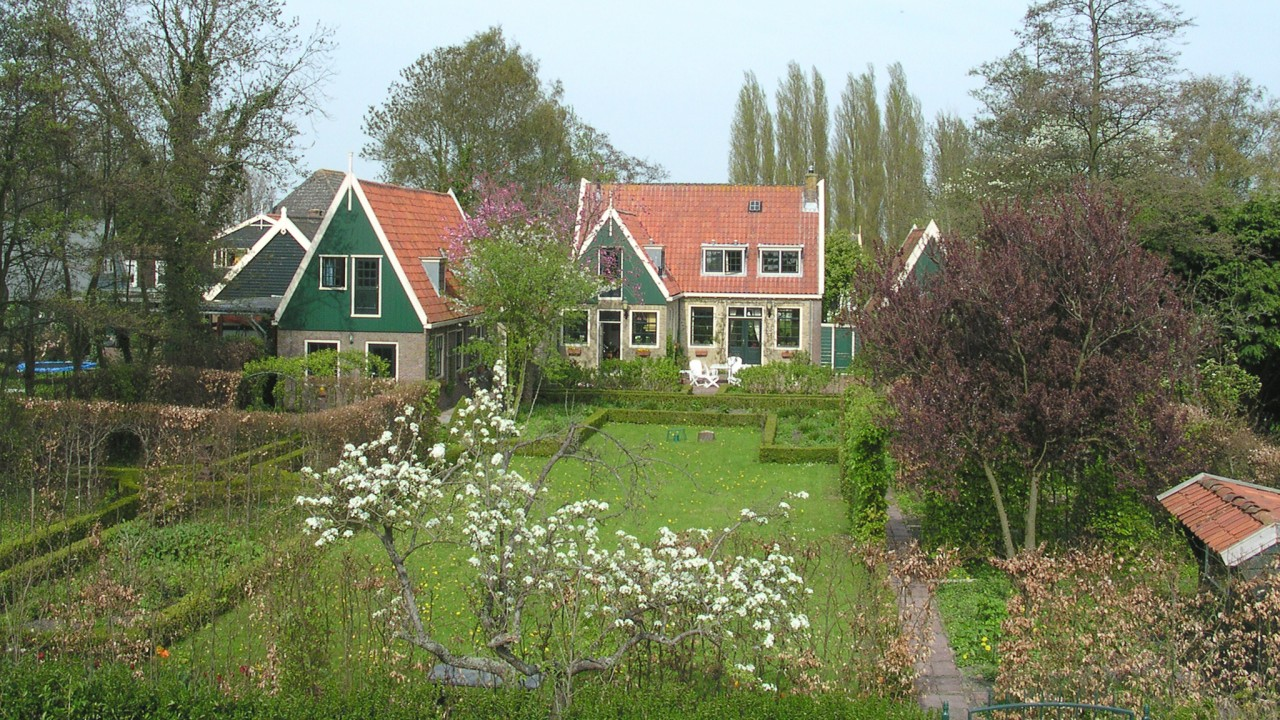
Houses in Schellinkhout
