= Oosterwijzend =

- Location in the Netherlands Location in the province of North Holland in the Netherlands
- Coordinates: 52°41′25″N 5°11′21″E
- Country: Netherlands
- Province: North Holland
- Municipality: Drechterland

Oosterwijzend is a hamlet in the municipality of Drechterland, in the Dutch province of North-Holland.

== Geography ==
Oosterwijzend lays just to the east of where the canal the Wijzend used to bend southwards from Binnenwijzend. To the west of the former Wijzend is Westerwijzend. Nowadays, Oosterwijzend and Westerwijzend are being separated by a paved road beginning in Hoogkarspel. Oosterwijzend is the smaller hamlet of the two, and is formally considered a part of Hoogkarspel.

The occupation of the southern part of the hamlet is mostly agricultural. The northern part is untilled, and borders the Zaandam-Enkhuizen railway. Oosterwijzend has a small industry area, called Zuiderwijzend.
