= Westerwijzend =

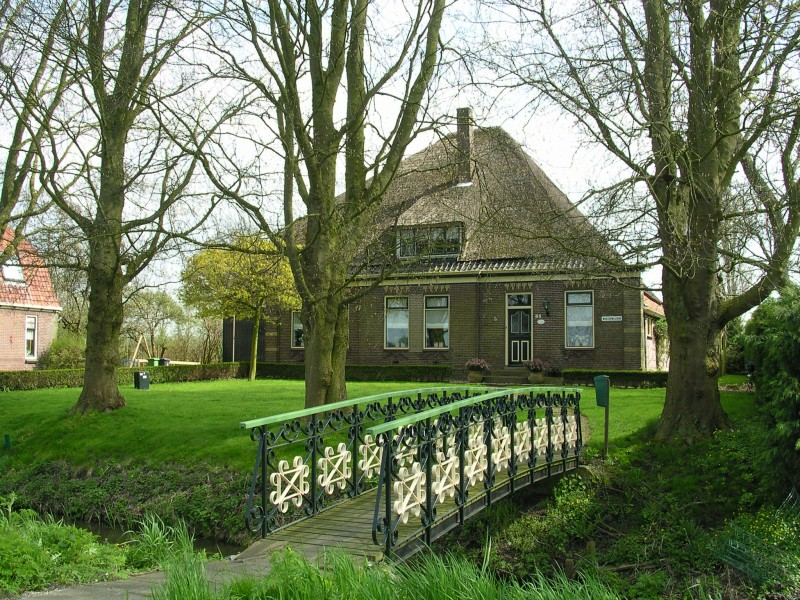
- Bridge to a farmhouse

- Location in the Netherlands Location in the province of North Holland in the Netherlands
- Coordinates: 52°41′18″N 5°10′42″E
- Country: Netherlands
- Province: North Holland
- Municipality: Drechterland

Westerwijzend is a hamlet in the municipality of Drechterland, in the Dutch province of North-Holland.

Westerwijzend lays just to the west of where the Wijzend canal used to bend southwards from Binnenwijzend. To the east of the former Wijzend is Oosterwijzend. Nowadays, Oosterwijzend and Westerwijzend are being separated by a paved road beginning in Hoogkarspel. Westerwijzend is the bigger hamlet of the two, and is formally considered a part of Hoogkarspel.

The occupation of the southern part of the hamlet is mostly agricultural. The northern part is untilled, and borders the Zaandam-Enkhuizen railway.
