= Westwoud =

- Village
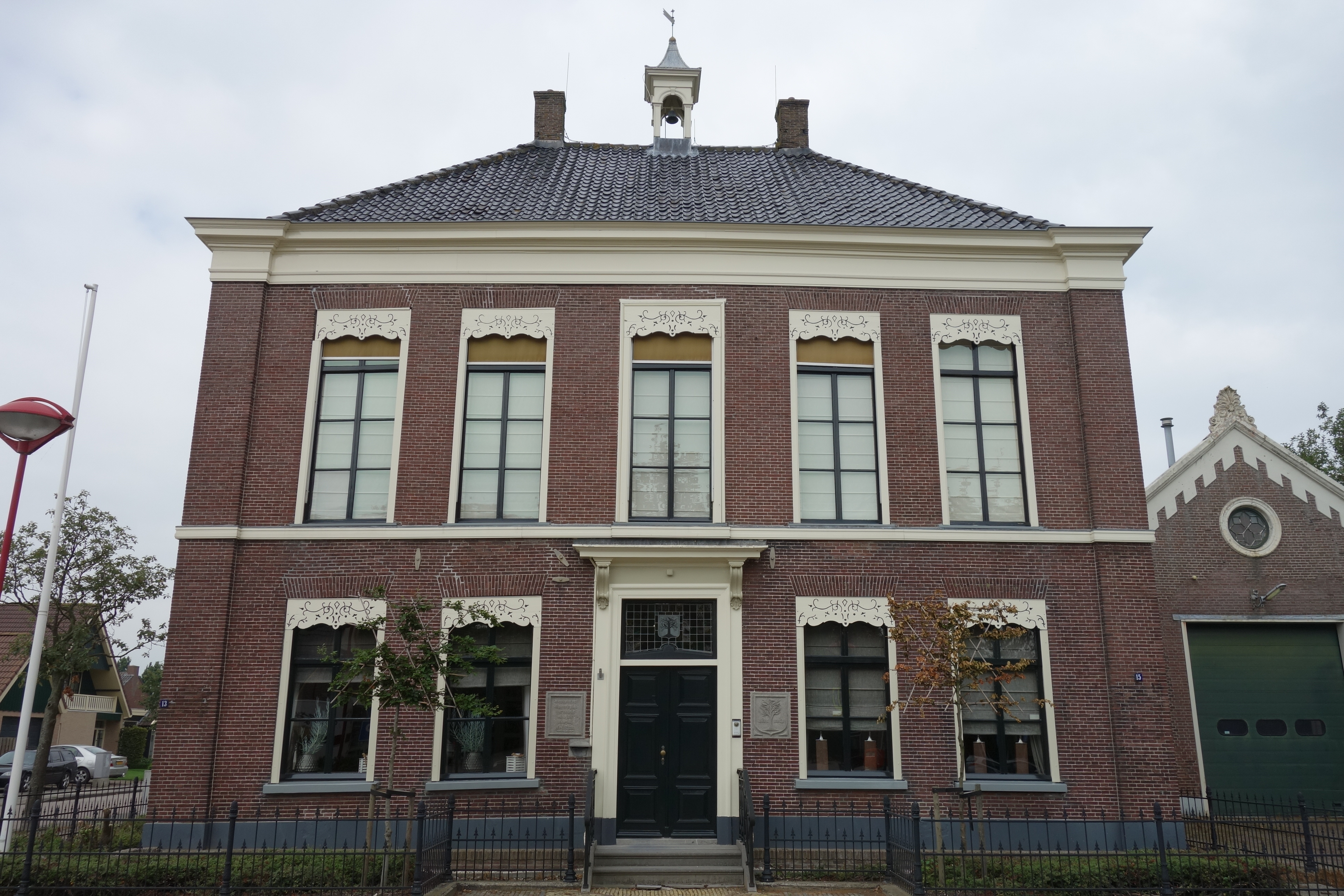
- Former town hall of Westwoud

- Flag Coat of arms

- Location of Westwoud in the Netherlands
- Coordinates: 52°41′0″N 5°8′0″E
- Country: Netherlands
- Province: North Holland
- Municipality: Drechterland

Area
  - Village: 8.73 km^{2} (3.37 sq mi)
  - Land: 8.67 km^{2} (3.35 sq mi)
  - Water: 0.05 km^{2} (0.019 sq mi)

Population (2025)
  - Village: 1,850
  - Density: 205.88/km^{2} (533.2/sq mi)
  - Urban: 1,385
- Demonym: Westwouder
- Postcode: 1617
- Area code: 0228

Westwoud is a village in the Netherlands. It is located in the region of West Friesland in North Holland, about 4 kilometers northeast of Hoorn. The town is part of the municipality of Drechterland and has a population of 1,785.

Westwoud received city rights in 1414, along with the villages of Westerblokker and Oosterblokker. This mainly meant it could form its own judicial district, which was abolished in 1811. It was a separate municipality between 1817 and 1979, when it merged with Hoogkarspel and Oosterblokker to form the municipality Bangert, which was changed to Drechterland in 1980.

== Gallery ==
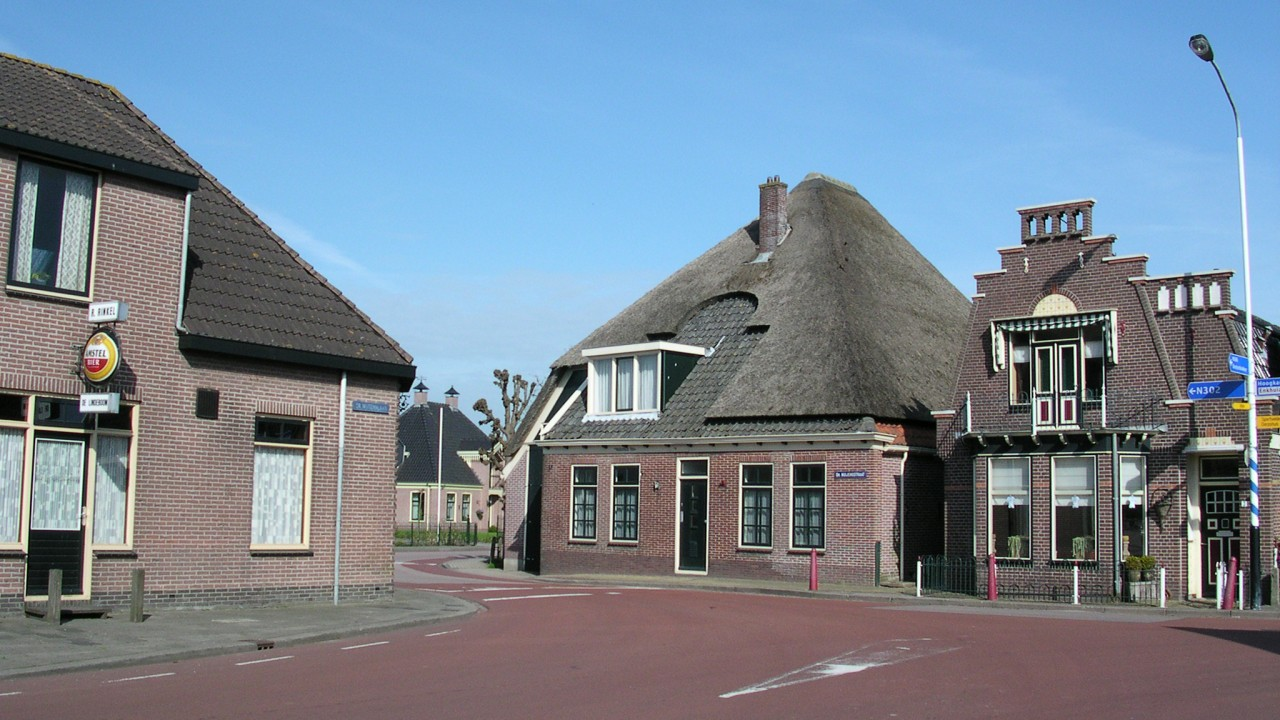
Village center

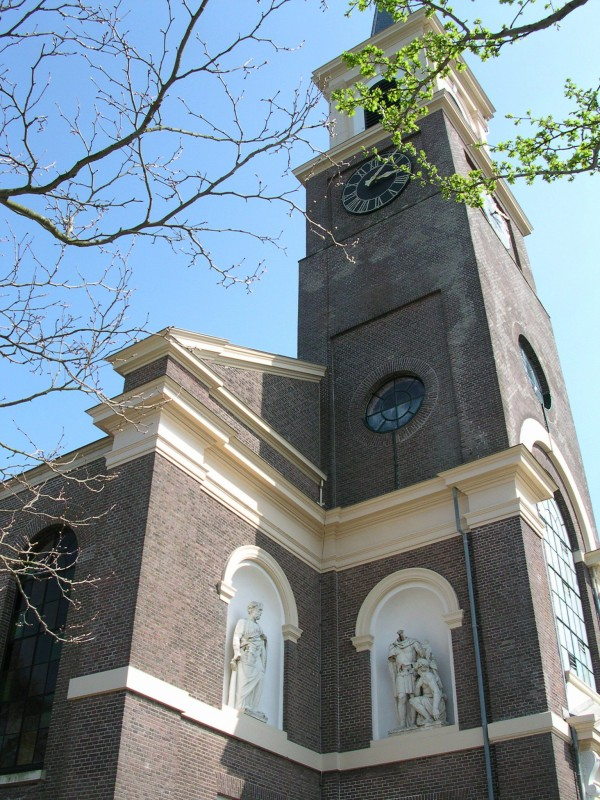
Saint Martin's Church

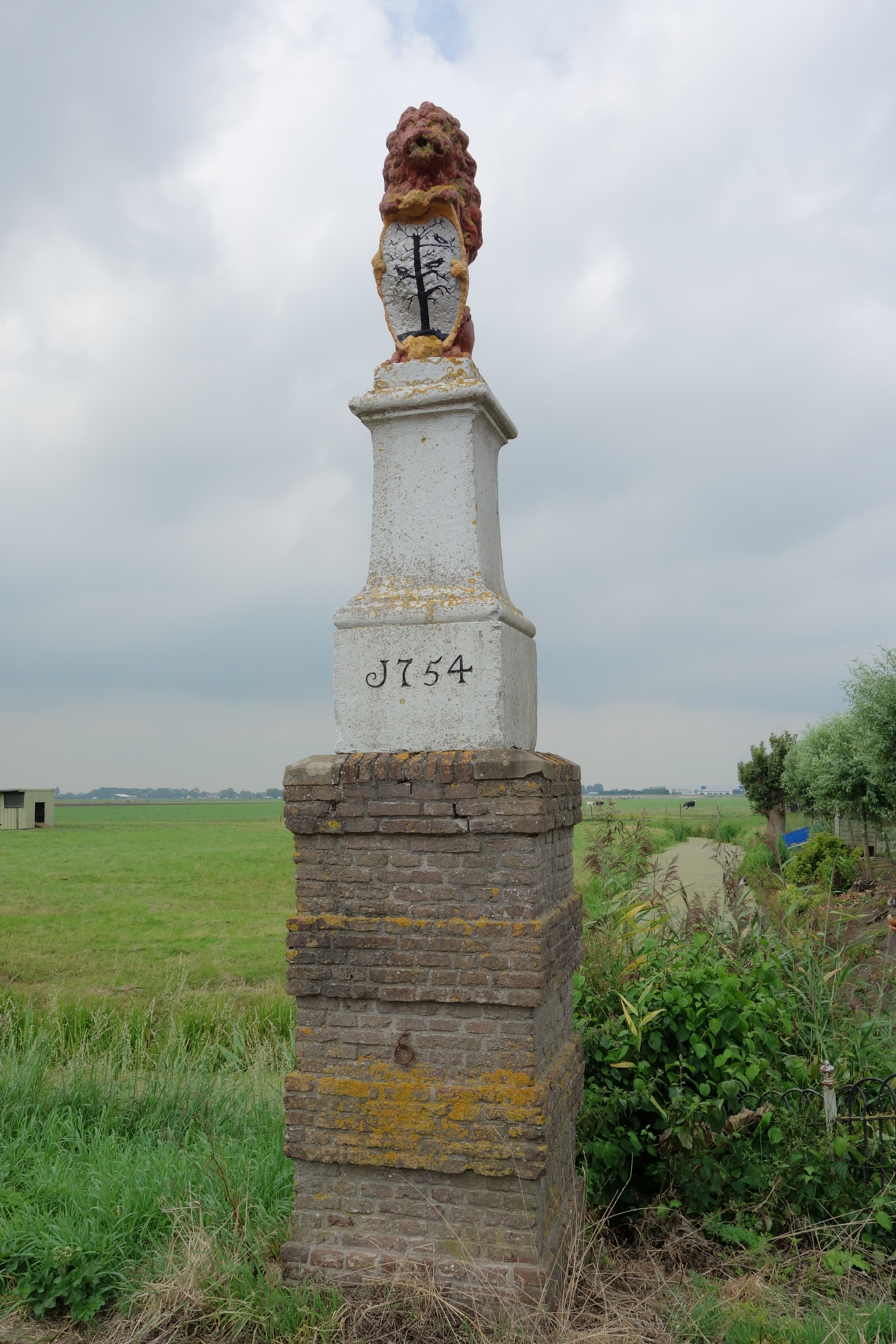
Historic border pole
