= Hem, Netherlands =

Hem
- Village
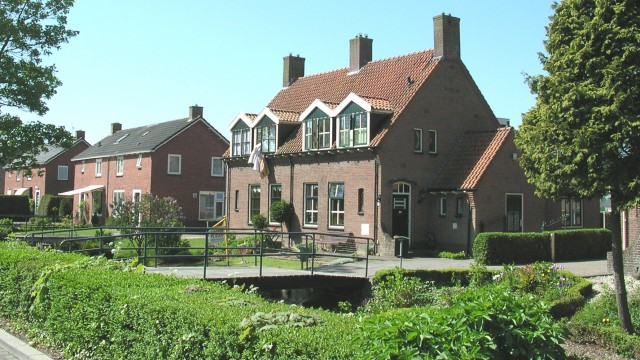

- Location in the Netherlands Location in the province of North Holland in the Netherlands
- Coordinates: 52°39′40″N 5°10′59″E
- Country: Netherlands
- Province: North Holland
- Municipality: Drechterland

Area
  - Village: 8.44 km^{2} (3.26 sq mi)
- Elevation: −0.5 m (−1.6 ft)

Population (2025)
  - Village: 1,590
  - Density: 188/km^{2} (488/sq mi)
  - Urban: 1,135
- Time zone: UTC+1 (CET)
  - Summer (DST): UTC+2 (CEST)
- Postal code: 1607
- Dialing code: 0228

Hem (West Frisian: Him) (population estimate: 1230) is a village in the municipality Drechterland, located in the north west of the Netherlands, in the province of North Holland and the region of West-Frisia.

The village was first mentioned around 1312 as Hem, and means "silted land in a bend of a stream". Hem developed in the 12th century as a peat excavation settlement.

The tower of the Dutch Reformed church dates from around 1500. The baluster and spire were constructed after a 1897 fire. The matching church was demolished in 1972 after a fire. The Catholic St Lucas Church is an aisleless church from 1930. Hem was home to 591 people in 1840.

== Notable people ==
- Alice Besseling, politician

== Gallery ==
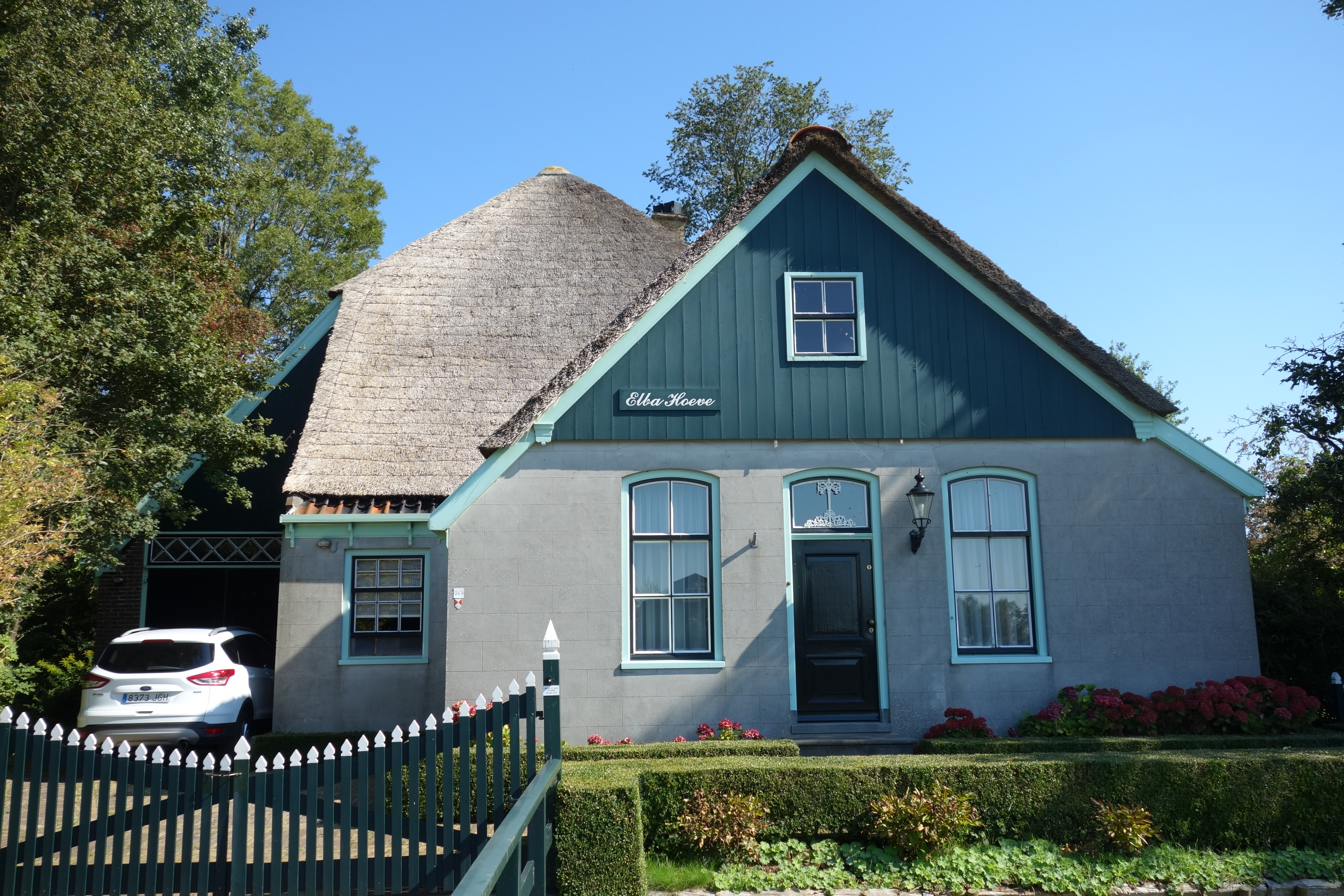
Farm Elba Hoeve

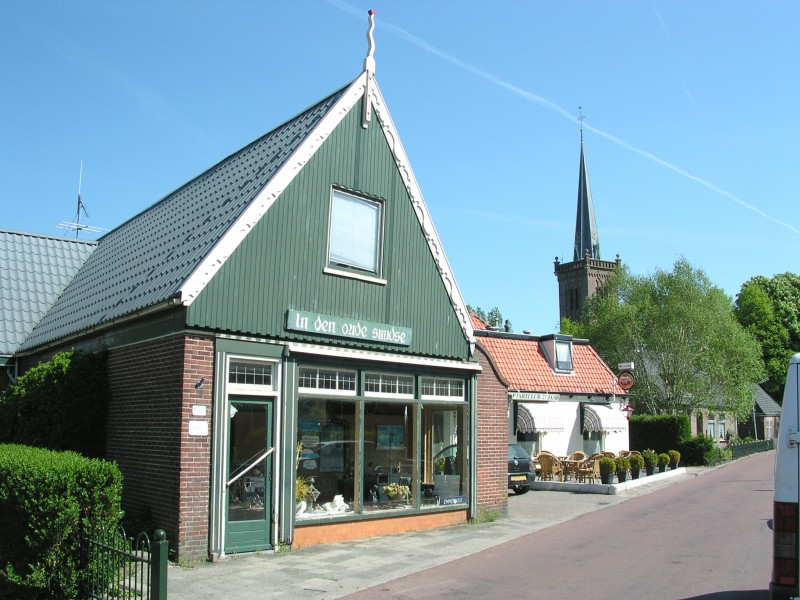
Former forge

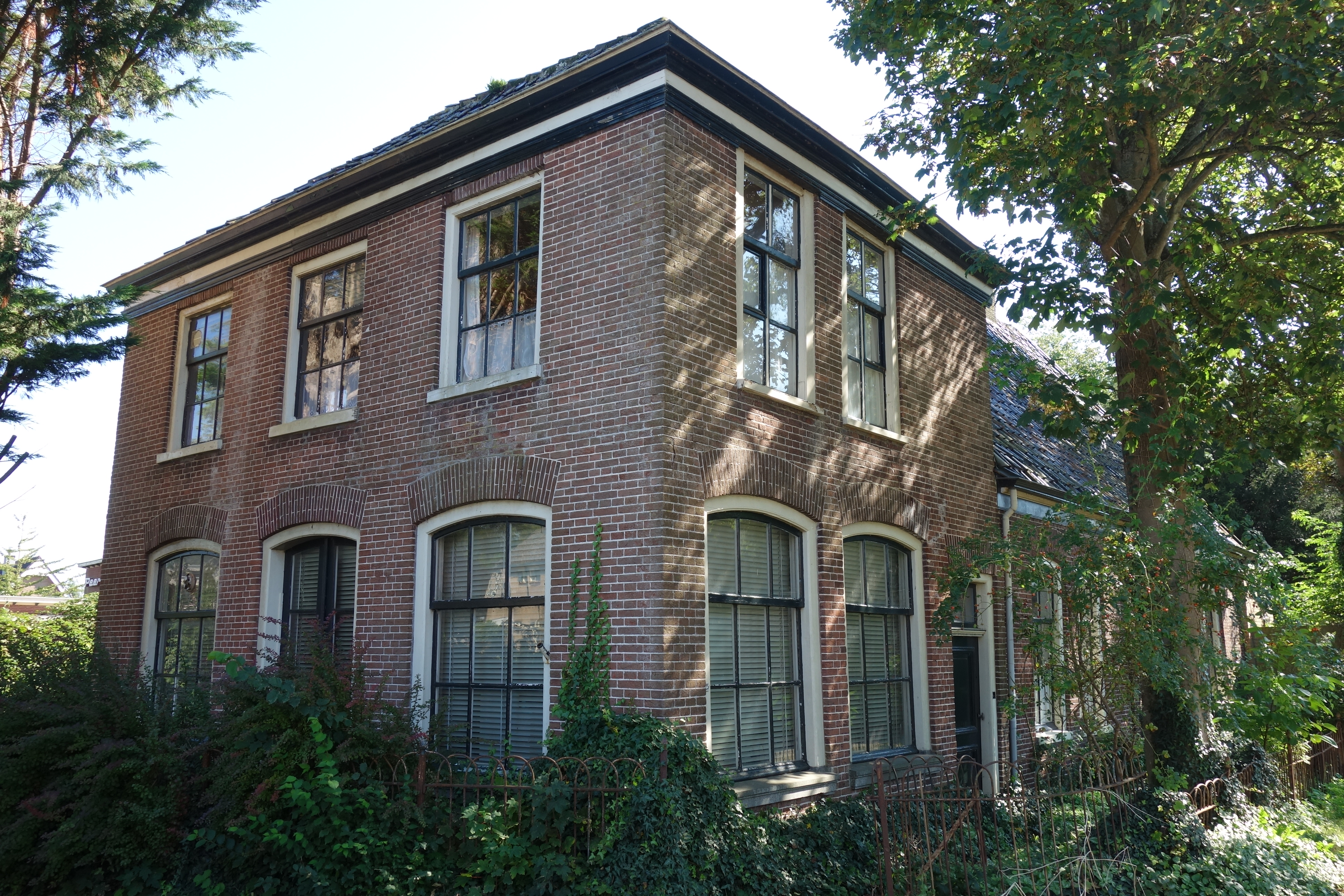
Farm in Hem

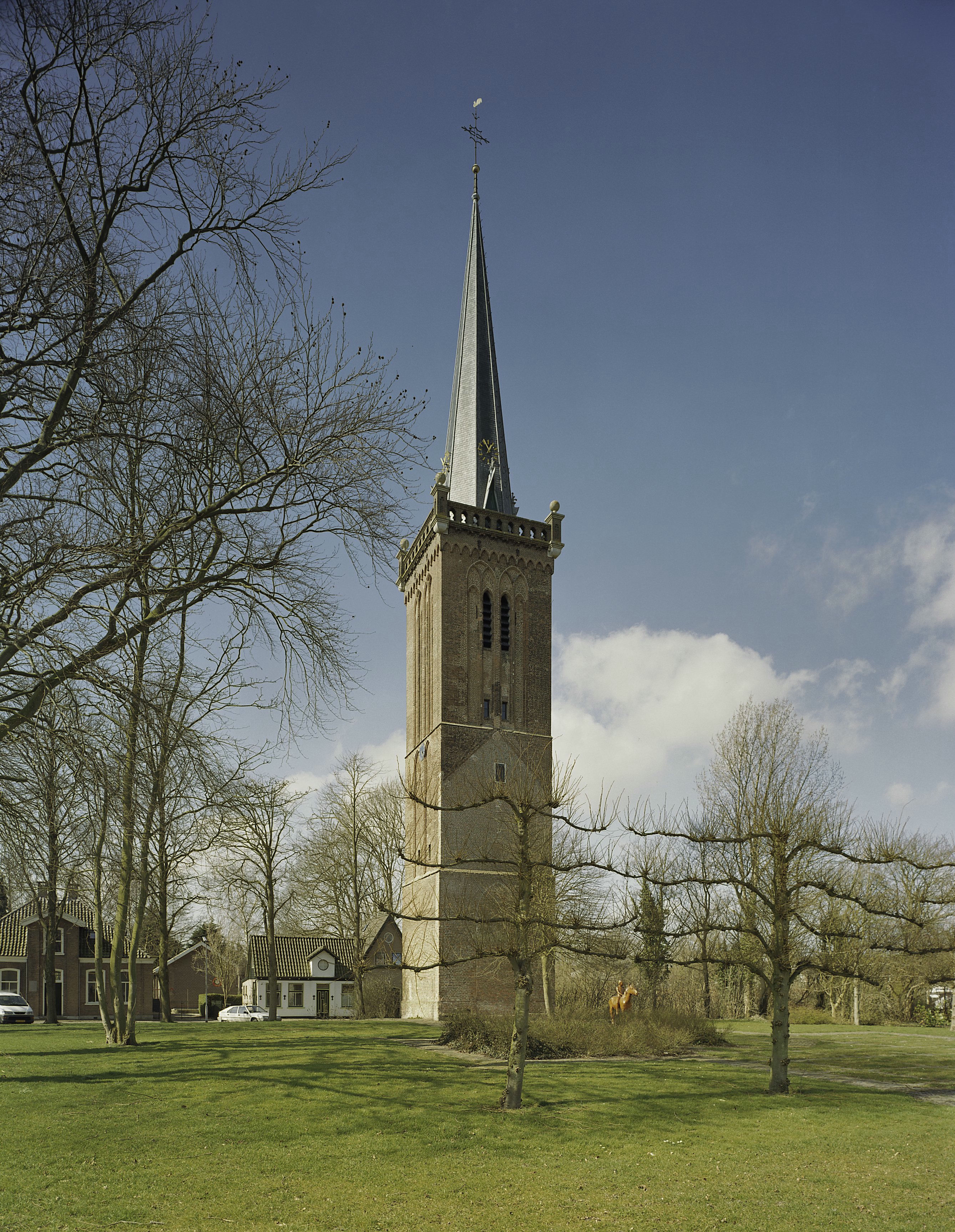
Tower of the former church
