= Hoogkarspel water tower =

Coordinates: 52.6949°N 5.1746°E

- Watertoren Hoogkarspel
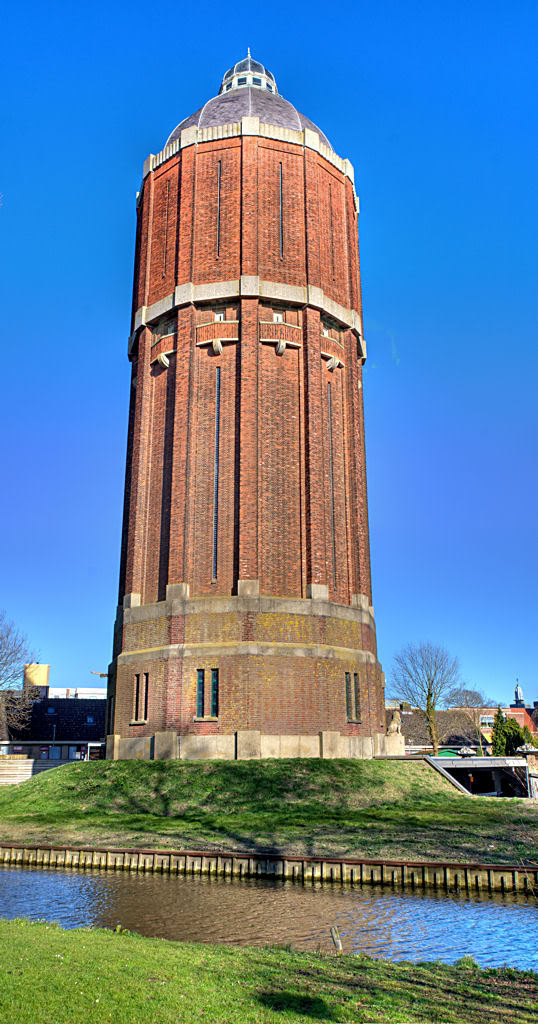
- Interactive map of the Hoogkarspel water tower area

General information
- Type: Water tower
- Location: Hoogkarspel, Netherlands
- Construction started: 1930

Design and construction
- Architect: W. Mensert

The Hoogkarspel water tower is a water tower in Hoogkarspel, Netherlands built in 1930. Its architect is W. Mensert, who worked for PWN at the time. The tower is 49,1 metres tall and has two water reservoirs of 600 and 400 m^{3}, and is an official rijksmonument. It has no current use.

The tower is located in the centre of the village, which is remarkable, since water towers of this height can usually only be found at barely inhabited places.
