= Oosterleek =

- Village
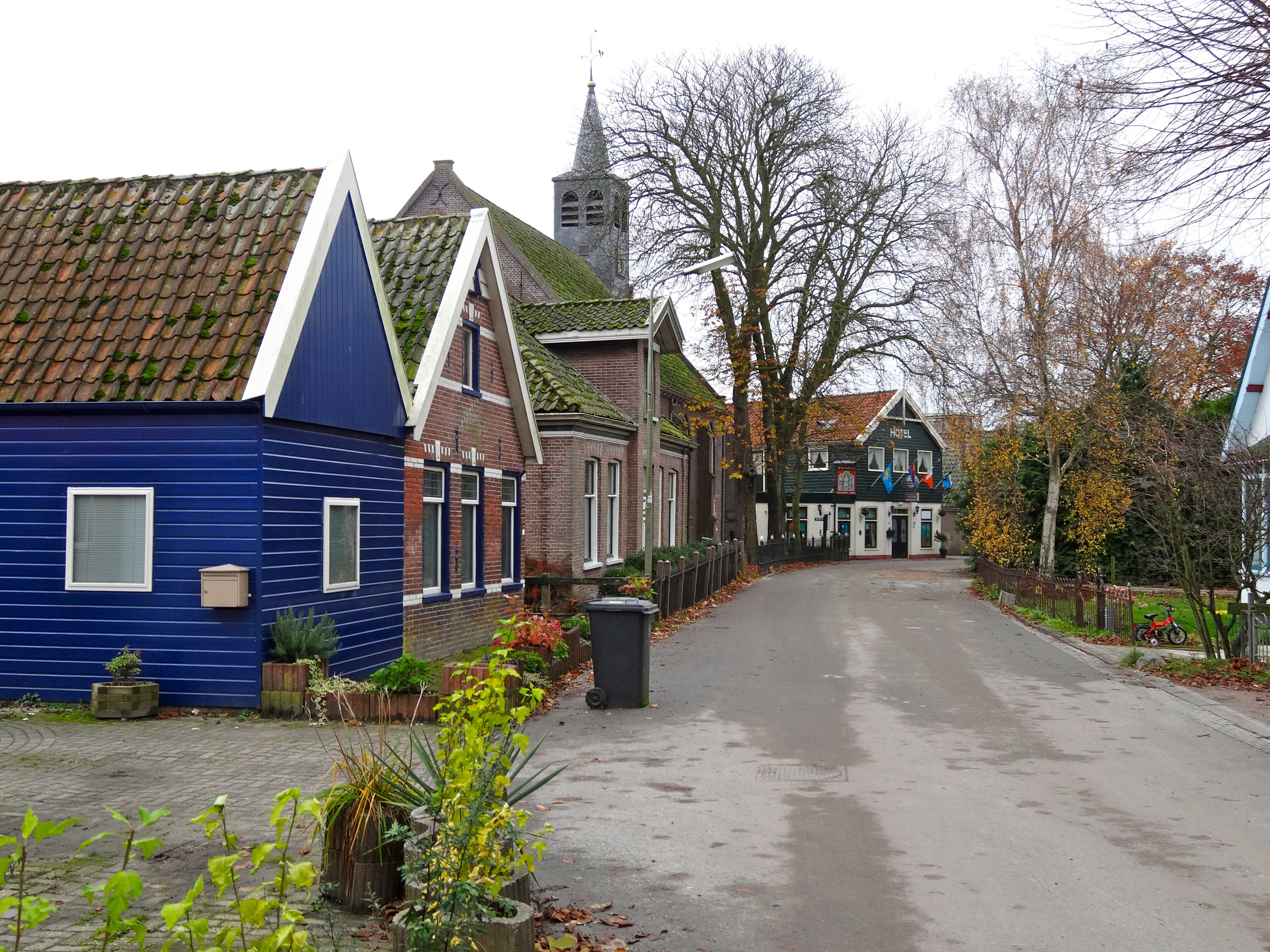

- Location in the Netherlands Location in the province of North Holland in the Netherlands
- Coordinates: 52°38′18″N 5°11′51″E
- Country: Netherlands
- Province: North Holland
- Municipality: Drechterland

Area
  - Total: 1.05 km^{2} (0.41 sq mi)
- Elevation: −0.6 m (−2.0 ft)

Population (2025)
  - Total: 100
  - Density: 95/km^{2} (250/sq mi)
- Time zone: UTC+1 (CET)
  - Summer (DST): UTC+2 (CEST)
- Postal code: 1609
- Dialing code: 0229

Oosterleek is a small village in the municipality of Drechterland, in the Dutch province North Holland. The village used to belong to the municipalities Venhuizen (1970–2006) and Wijdenes (pre-1970).

Oosterleek was first noted on a map in 1311 as Oesterleke, in which oester means "eastern" and leke means "stream". This name was supposedly a reference to the fact that the village was located to the east of a stream. During the 17th century, it was a fishing village which was home to a population of about 500 people.

Nowadays, a small bit of Oosterleek lies in the Markermeer, because the levee was moved westwards to guarantee full safety. It is said that this part included a church. The current church was built in 1694. The church was decommissioned in 1972, and is nowadays used for weddings, expositions and concerts. It is also home to local library.

== Gallery ==
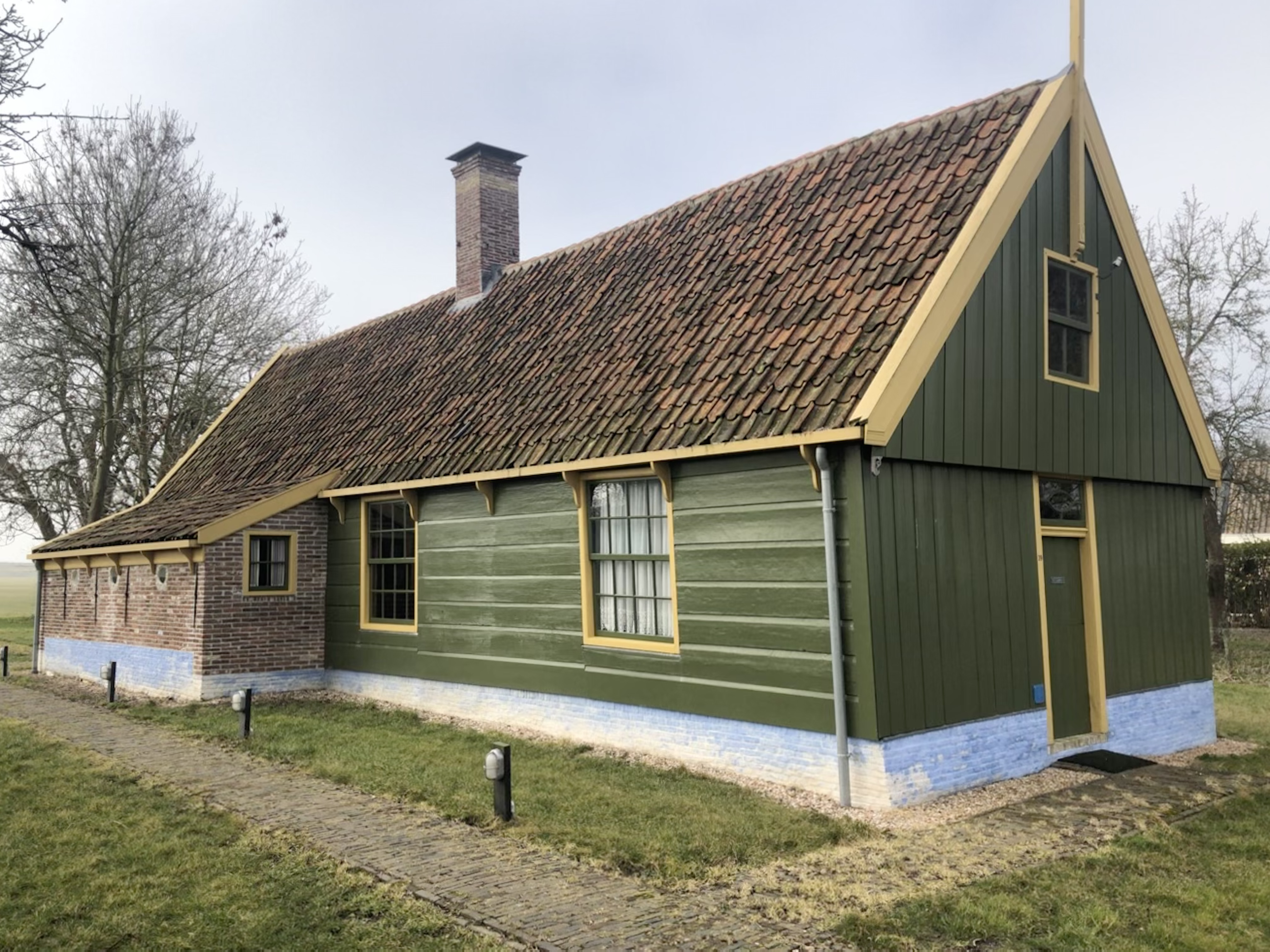
Wooden farm

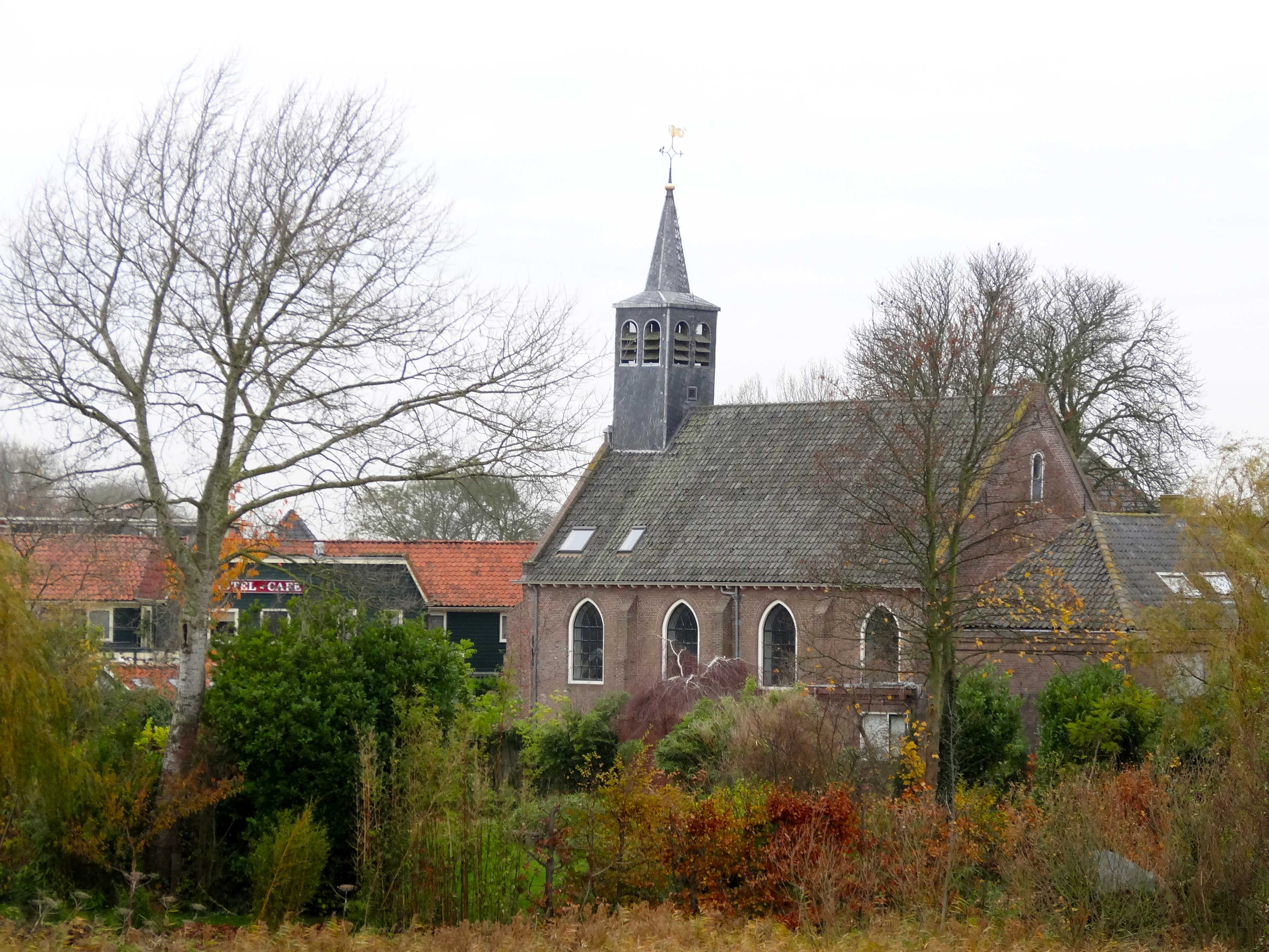
Church of Oosterleek
