= Cornelius Jacobsen May =

Dutch sea captain of the 17th century

Cornelius Jacobson Mey

1st Director of New Netherland
- In office 1624–1625
- Succeeded by: Willem Verhulst

Personal details
- Relations: Jan Jacobszoon May van Schellinkhout (brother)

Cornelis Jacobsen Mey, often spelled Cornelius Jacobsz May, among other spellings in Dutch, was a 17th-century Dutch explorer, captain, and fur trader. Mey was the first director of New Netherland and was stationed at Fort Amsterdam. Mey was the captain of the ship Nieu Nederlandt, which delivered the first boatload of colonists to New Netherland in north-east America.

== Family ==
May is believed to have been from Hoorn in the northwest Netherlands but may have been born in the smaller village of Schellinkhout, located just east of Hoorn. His brother is believed to have been Jan Jacobszoon May van Schellinkhout for whom the island of Jan Mayen is named. Both brothers were cousins of Jan Cornelisz May, a prominent Dutch sailor and voyager who led several expeditions to the Northeast passage and circumnavigated the world with Joris van Spilbergen between 1614 and 1617.

== 1614 to 1616 expeditions in North America ==
In 1614, May was the first to sail the Mauritius River, now known as the Hudson River, where he entered into an agreement with various competing Indian tribal traders. On October 11, 1614, May became party to the New Netherland Company, which received an exclusive patent from the States General of the Netherlands for four voyages to be undertaken for the next three years to territories discovered between the 40th and 45th parallels at the exclusion of all other Dutch through January 1618.

From August 1616 to November 1616, the New Netherland Company tried unsuccessfully to secure a patent for a territory located between the 38th and 40th parallels at Delaware Bay, which had been surveyed from 1614 to 1615 by Cornelis Hendricksz from Monnikendam on the ship Onrust. In 1616, Cornelis Hendricksen, sailed the Onrust up the Zuyd Rivier, now known as the Delaware River, from Delaware Bay to its northernmost navigable reaches, on a voyage to ransom three fur traders taken from Fort Nassau on the North River.

On behalf of the successor company of the New Netherland Company, May explored and surveyed the Delaware Bay on a ship named called the Blyde Boodschap, for the exploration of territories to the west of and below Manhattan, and those in as far south as the fortieth degree in Virginia and engaged in trade with the Indians there in 1620. In 1621, he ordered the construction of a factory at Fort Nassau at the mouth of Big Timber Creek.

Two of the six business partners with two ships, Blijde Boodschap and Bever, focused on exploration and trade in the Zuidt Rivier, or Delaware River, were Thijmen Jacobsz Hinlopen and Samuel Godijn. Cape Hinlopen, now spelled Cape Henlopen in Delaware, is named after Thijmen Jacobsz Hinlopen. Cape Hinlopen was New Netherland's most southern border on the 38th parallel. Godyn's Bay, now Delaware Bay, was named for Samuel Godyn, one of the first patrons in New Netherland and a director of the Dutch West India Company and the Northern Company.

== First colonists of New Netherlands ==
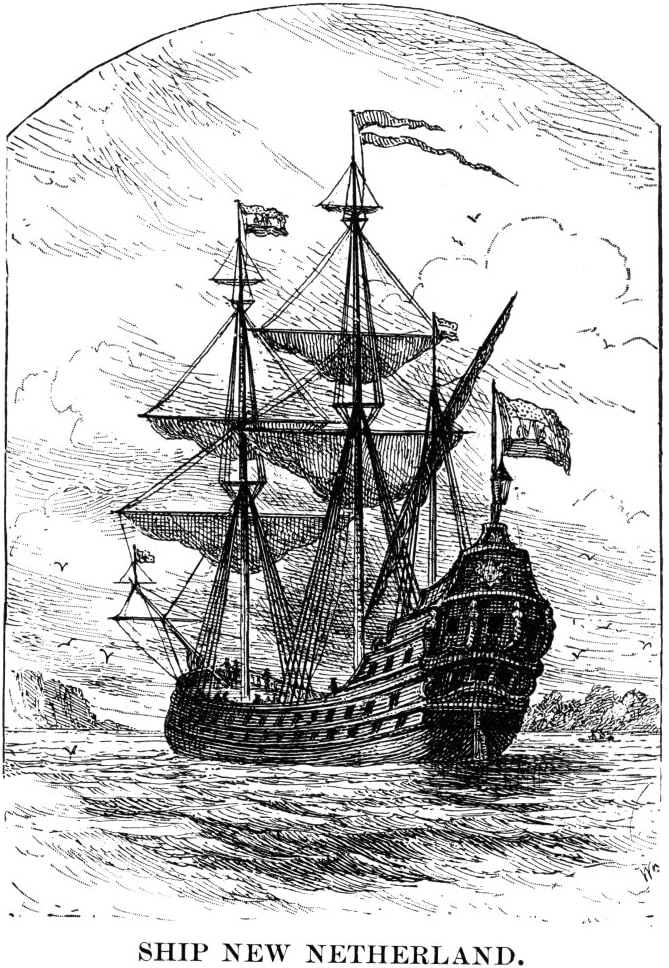
Nieu Nederlandt ship portrait

May was unable to trade in the South River, now known as the Delaware River, to the exclusion of competing Dutch companies. Though the competing Dutch companies were eventually able to reach agreement on New Netherlands, discord arose again which was finally settled by arbitrators in Amsterdam, on December 23, 1623. In 1624, the 38th and 39th parallels region came under the final jurisdiction of the Dutch West India Company with the delivery of New Netherland, including the Walloon and Flemish families.

May was the captain of the ship Nieu Nederlandt (aka New Netherland) which delivered the first boat load of colonists to New Netherland, first at Fort Orange, the trading post near present-day Albany, New York, and then on Governors Island, in present-day New York City, in 1624. In the spring of 1624, May returned to New Netherland in command of the Nieu Nederlandt with the first group of settlers, mostly young Walloon families. Some were sent to company lands in Connecticut. Two families and eight single males took a sloop to the Zuidt (South) River, now the Delaware River, and established Fort Wilhelmus. Eight men were also left on Nut Island to promote the fur trade, and the remaining 18 families proceeded to Fort Orange. Having transformed New Netherland into a Dutch province, May was named the province's first director. During May's brief directorship, Fort Orange was completed on the North River, and Fort Nassau on the South River.

== Legacy ==
Cape May, New Jersey and Cape May County, New Jersey are both named after Mey.

== See also ==
- Dutch colonization of the Americas
- Dutch colonial empire
- List of colonial governors of New Jersey
- List of colonial governors of New York
- Fort Amsterdam

== Bibliography ==
- Brodhead, John Romeyn (1853). History of the state of New York. Vol. I. Harper & Brothers.
- Klein, Milton M. (2001). The Empire State : a history of New York. Ithaca : Cornell University Press; Cooperstown : New York State Historical Association. ISBN 978-0-80148-9914.
- Shorto, Russell (2004). The Island at the Center of the World. New York : Doubleday. ISBN 9781400078677.
- van Laer, A.J.F., ed. (1924). Documents relating to New Netherland, 1624-1626, in the Henry E. Huntington Library. West-Indische Compagnie (Netherlands); Henry E. Huntington Library and Art Gallery. ISBN 9780598823618.
- Wheeler, Edward Smith (1876). Scheyichbi and the Strand. J.B. Lippincott & Company, Philadelphia.
  Google book
