= J. F. Besseling =

- Born: 10 March 1928; Enschede
- Died: 9 May 2015 (aged 87)
- Scientific career
- Fields: Mechanics, Continuum Mechanics, Thermodynamics, Thermomechanics
- Workplaces: Delft University of Technology, Stanford University, National Aerospace Laboratory
- Doctoral advisor: H. Hermans (1967), W. Visser (1968), K. van der Werff (1977), P.J. Oosterloo (1980), L.J. Ernst (1981), H. Huetink (1986), E. van der Giessen (1987), B. Jonker (1988), J.P. Meijaard (1991), A. van Keulen (1993), Diguang Gong (1995)

Johannes Ferdinand "Hans" Besseling (10 March 1928 – 9 May 2015) was professor emeritus of Engineering Mechanics at the Delft University of Technology, worked in the field of the application of solid mechanics to the analysis of structures; constitutive equations for the mathematical description of material behaviour. His specialities are finite element methods, continuum thermodynamics, creep and plasticity of metals.

== Research ==
Research field:
Finite element methods for the analysis of linear and nonlinear mechanical systems, static as well as dynamic behaviour.
Development of thermo mechanical constitutive equations for the mathematical description of the deformation behaviour of metals and rubber (theory and experiments).

Professional results:
1953: Constitutive equations for creep and plasticity on the basis of a "fraction model".
1957: Two reaction theory for induction motors.
1964: Discretization method with dual vector spaces for forces velocities and for stresses deformations.
1966: Natural reference state theory for large inelastic deformation.
1975: Finite beamelements for arbitrarily large displacements and rotations.
1979: Structural analysis in terms of linear algebra.
1986: "Work" continuation method for problems with limit points.
1990: Axially symmetric shellelement for arbitrarily large rotations.

== Honors and awards ==
1974: Doctor Honoris Causa of the Vrije Universiteit Brussel.
1993: Festschrift on the occasion of the 65th birthday of Johannes Ferdinand Besseling, Edited by J.Argyris and E.van der Giessen, Special Issue of Computer Methods in Applied Mechanics and Engineering, Volume 103, Nos. 1–2, pp. 1–346.
1994: Honorary member of the General Council of the International Association for Computational Mechanics since August 1994.

== Publications ==
Characteristic publications with J. F.Besseling as single author:
1956: Application of matrix calculus in adjusting stiffness and vibration properties of redundant structures, Proc. of the 9th Int. Congress of Theoretical and Applied Mechanics, Brussel.
1957: Sterkte- en trillingsberekeningen voor de transsone windtunnel van het NLL met behulp van elektronische rekenmachines, De Ingenieur, Jaarg. 69, No.42, Oct. 1957, pp L17–L23.
1957: An Investigation on the damping of the torsional vibrations in synchronous alternators and induction motors, Rep. ST-14, NLL, 1957.
1958: A theory of elastic, plastic and creep deformations of an initially isotropic material, Journal of Applied Mechanics, Vol. 25, No.4, Dec. 1958.
1960: Thermodynamic foundations of the theory of deformation, Proc. Durand Centennial Conference on Aeronautics and Astronautics, Pergamon Press Ltd., 1960.
1963: The complete analogy between the matrix equations and the continuous field equations of structural analysis, Proc.Int.Symposium on Analogue and Digital Techniques applied to Aeronautics, Luik, September 1963.
1965: Matrix Analysis of Creep and Plasticity Problems, Proc. Conf. on Matrix Methods in Structural Mechanics, Dayton Ohio, AFFDL-TR-66-80, okt. 1965.
1966: A Thermodynamic Approach to Rheology, IUTAM Symp. on Irreversible Aspects in Continuum Mechanics, Springer, June 1966, pp. 16–53.
1974: Plasticity and creep theory in engineering mechanics, Topics in applied continuum mechanics, pp. 28–63, Ed. by J.L.Zeman and F.Ziegler, Springer Verlag.

== International activities ==
J. F. Besseling's international activities:
1966: Founding member of "Euromech" Committee (with G.K.Batchelor(UK), D. Kuchemann (UK), K.Wille (W-Germany).
1966–1992: "Euromech" correspondent.
1967–1968: Chair "Henri Speciael", Universite Libre de Bruxelles, Faculte des Sciences Applique.
1968–1993: Advisory Editor of the International Journal for Numerical Methods in Engineering.
1970–1993: Advisory Editor of the Journal Computer Methods in Applied Mechanics and Engineering.
1980–1992: Representative of the Netherlands in the General Assembly of the International Union for Theoretical and Applied Mechanics.
1976: Member of the Local Organizing Committee of the 14th Int. Congress of Theor. and Appl. Mechanics in Delft.
1981–2000: Member of the Editorial Board of the Journal "Archive of Appl. Mech., Ingenieur-Archiv".
1987: Co chairman of the 7th Symposium on Trends in Applications of Mathematics to Mechanics of the International Society for the Interaction of Mechanics and Mathematics.

== Memberships ==
Membership professional societies and offices held:
1960–2000: Member of the Royal Institute for Engineers
1962–1968: Chairman sub section for Engineering Mechanics of the Applied Scientific Research Section TWO
1959–2013: Member of the Sigma Xi Society (The Scientific Research Society)
1978–today: Member of the International Society for the Interaction of Mechanics and Mathematics
1982–today: Member of the Royal Netherlands Academy of Arts and Sciences
1985–today: Member of the Koninklijke Hollandsche Maatschappij der Wetenschappen
1985: Founding member of the Council of the International Association for Computational Mechanics
