= Jan Jacobszoon May van Schellinkhout =

Dutch seafarer and explorer

Jan Jacobszoon May van Schellinkhout (fl. 1614–1623) was a Dutch seafarer and explorer.

== Family ==
May was born in the small village of Schellinkhout, just east of the town of Hoorn in North Holland. He appears to be the brother of Cornelis Jacobsz May, the first director of New Netherland. The brothers were cousins of the contemporaneously far more famous sailor Jan Cornelisz May, who led several expeditions to explore the Northeast passage and between 1614 and 1617, circumnavigated the world with Joris van Spilbergen.

== Discovery of Jan Mayen island ==
Jan Jacobsz May is best remembered for giving his name to the island of Jan Mayen. As part of an exploratory expedition for the Noordsche Compagnie, May visited the island in July 1614. The highly regarded cartographer Joris Carolus was on board, and made a (now lost) report and (still existing) map of the voyage. On this map, he named one of its promontories "Jan Meys Hoeck". In 1620, the cartographer Willem Jansz Blaeu transferred the name to the island as a whole, although two other Dutch captains—Jan Jansz Kerckhoff, sailing for the Noordsche Compagnie, but privately financed by other people, and Fopp Gerritsz, sailing for the Englishman John Clarke, of Dunkirk—appeared to have beaten May to the island by a week or two.

The other captains apparently kept the discovery secret, perhaps so that their companies could benefit without giving the location away to the competition. The discovery allowed the Dutch company to use the island as its whaling base for the coming 35 years.

== Later life ==
After his 1614 voyage of discovery, Jan Jacobsz May was as late as 1623 mentioned as a captain on a Dutch warship employed by the Admiralty of the Noorderkwartier. In 1622, for example, he brought in a French warship.

In the past a street was named after him in his hometown of Schellinkhout, but he is otherwise little known in his home country, where the name Jan Mayen is often thought to be of Norwegian origin.
