= Wijdenes =

- Village
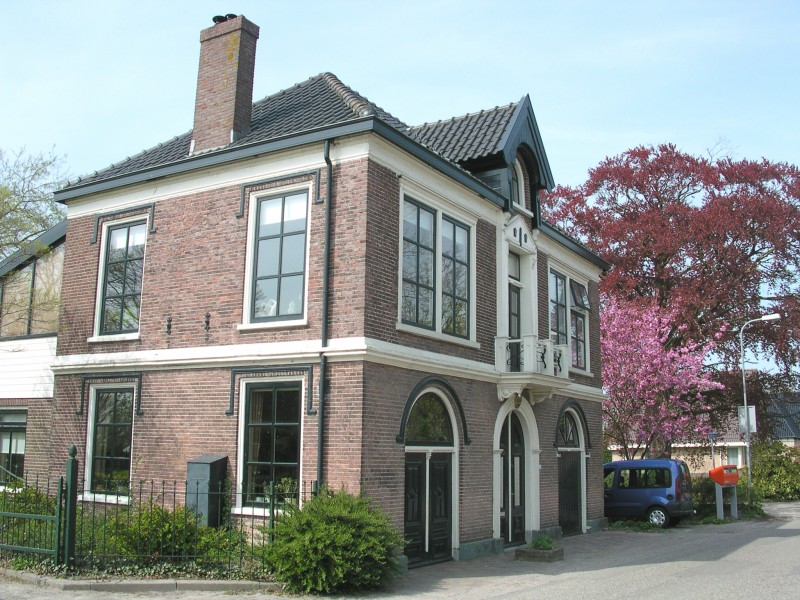
- Former town hall

- Coat of arms

- Location in the Netherlands Location in the province of North Holland in the Netherlands
- Coordinates: 52°38′N 5°09′E
- Country: Netherlands
- Province: North Holland
- Municipality: Drechterland

Area
  - Village: 10.20 km^{2} (3.94 sq mi)
- Elevation: −0.9 m (−3.0 ft)

Population (2025)
  - Village: 1,510
  - Density: 148/km^{2} (383/sq mi)
  - Urban: 1,325
  - Rural: 185
- Time zone: UTC+1 (CET)
  - Summer (DST): UTC+2 (CEST)
- Postal code: 1608
- Dialing code: 0229

Wijdenes (West Frisian: Venès) is a village in the Dutch province of North Holland. It is located in the municipality of Drechterland and the region of West-Frisia.

The village was first mentioned around 1312 as Widenesse, and means "wide headland". Wijdenes started as a peat excavation settlement in the 12th century. In 1282, a castle was built near the village by the count of Holland, but it was destroyed in 1296 by armies of West-Frisia.

The Dutch Reformed church was built in 1619 after the medieval church burnt down in 1616. The tower is from around 1500 and the balustrade and spire were added in 1839. The church is no longer in service, and is used as a recording studio and residential home.

Wijdenes was home to 347 people in 1840. It was a separate municipality between 1817 and 1970, when it was merged with Venhuizen.

== Notable residents ==
- Tony Beets (1959), a gold prospector made famous on Gold Rush.

== Gallery ==
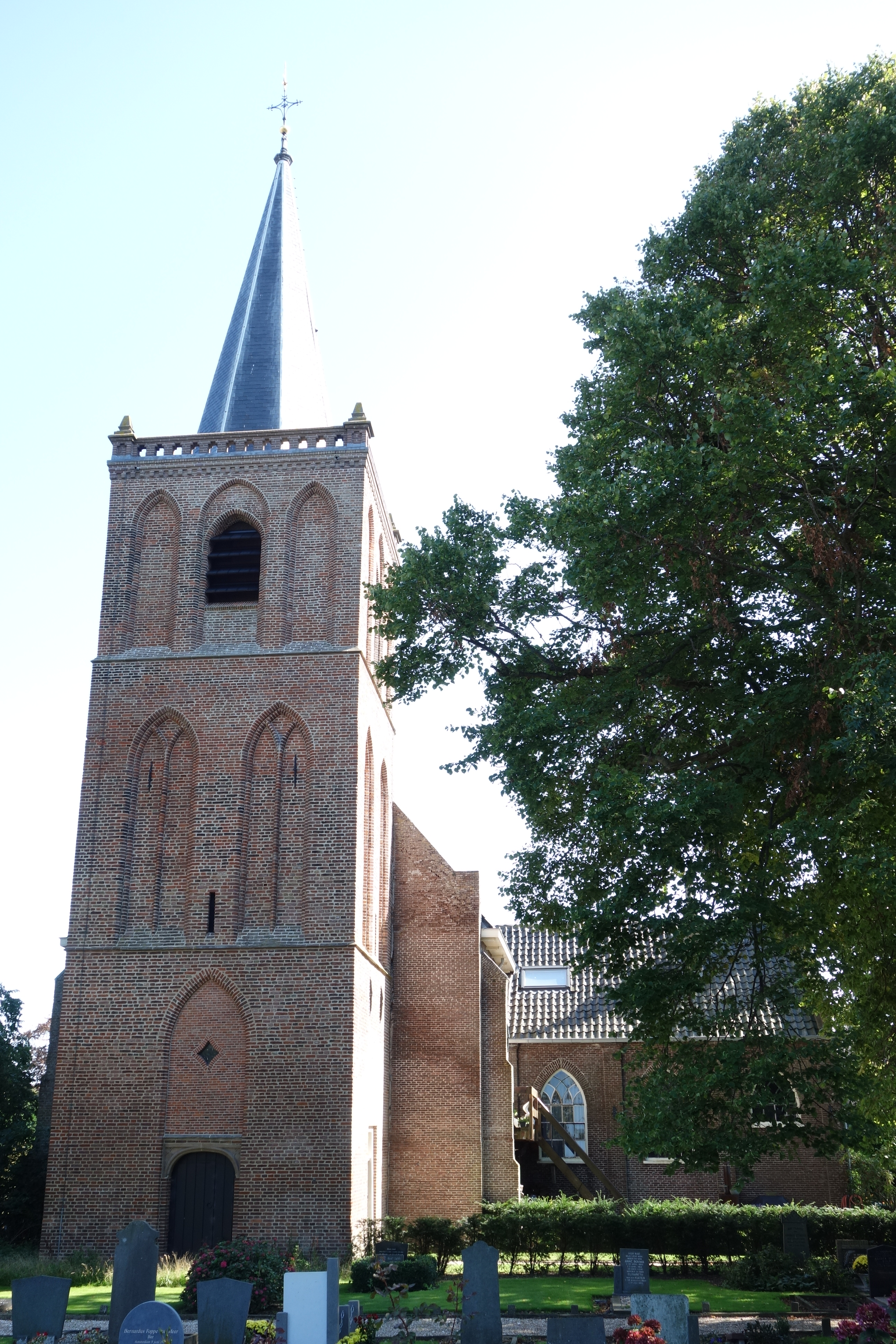
Dutch Reformed church

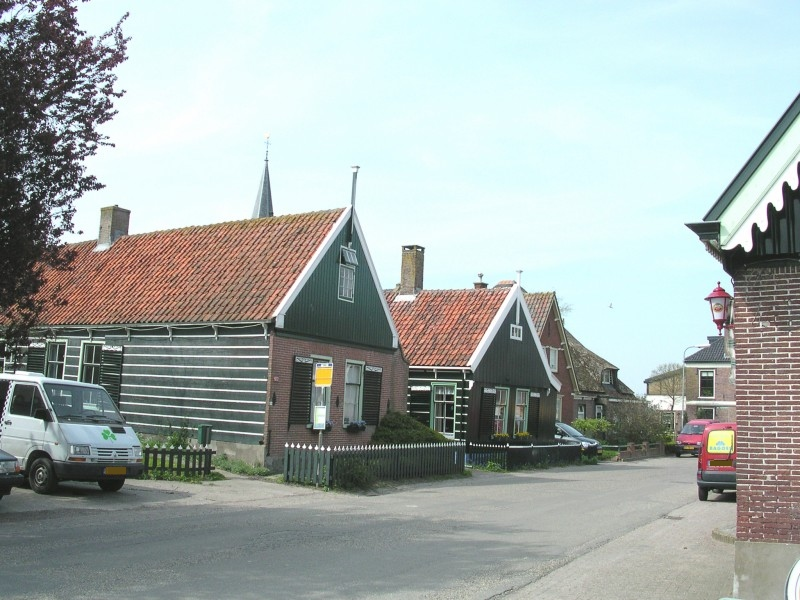

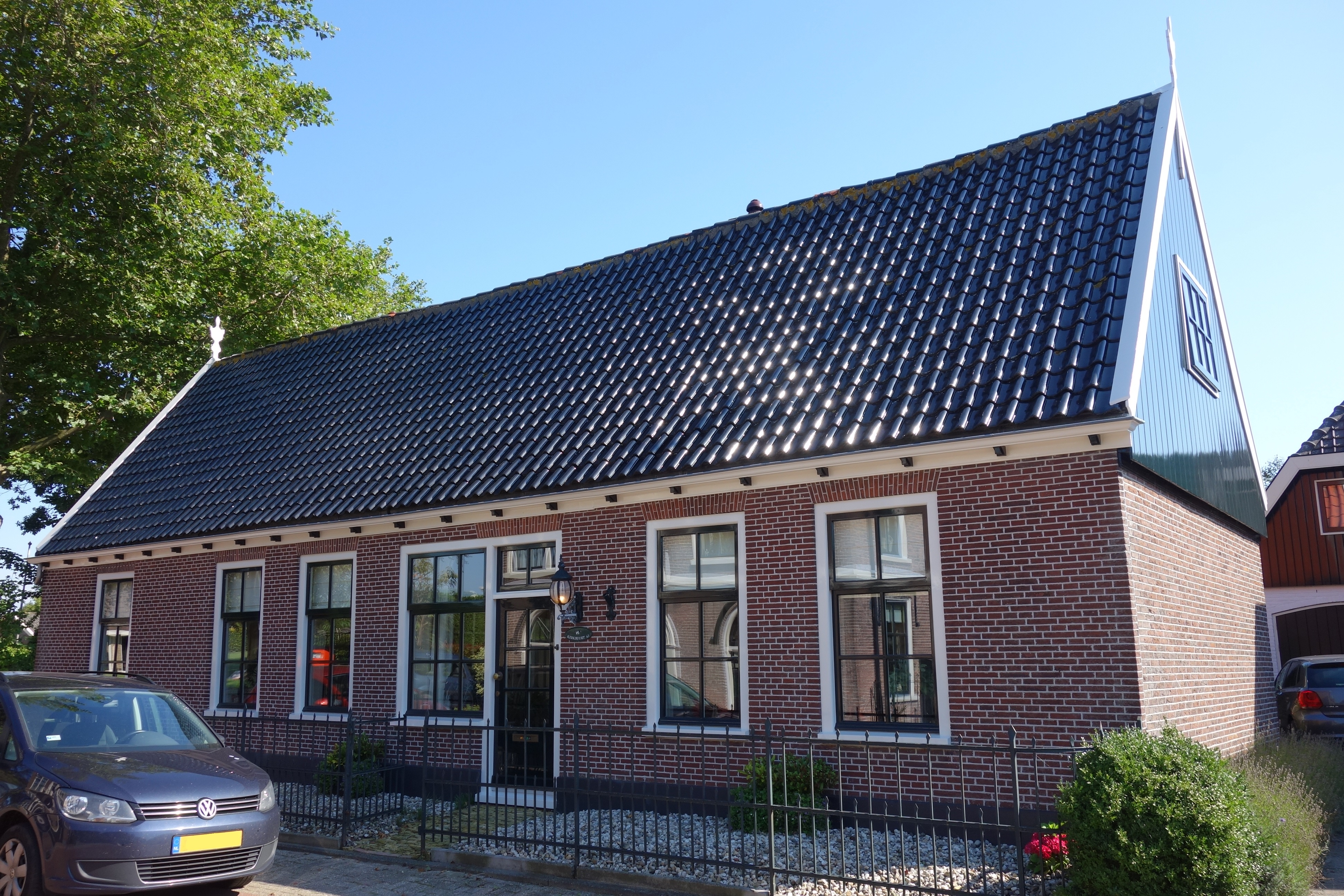
House in Wijdenes

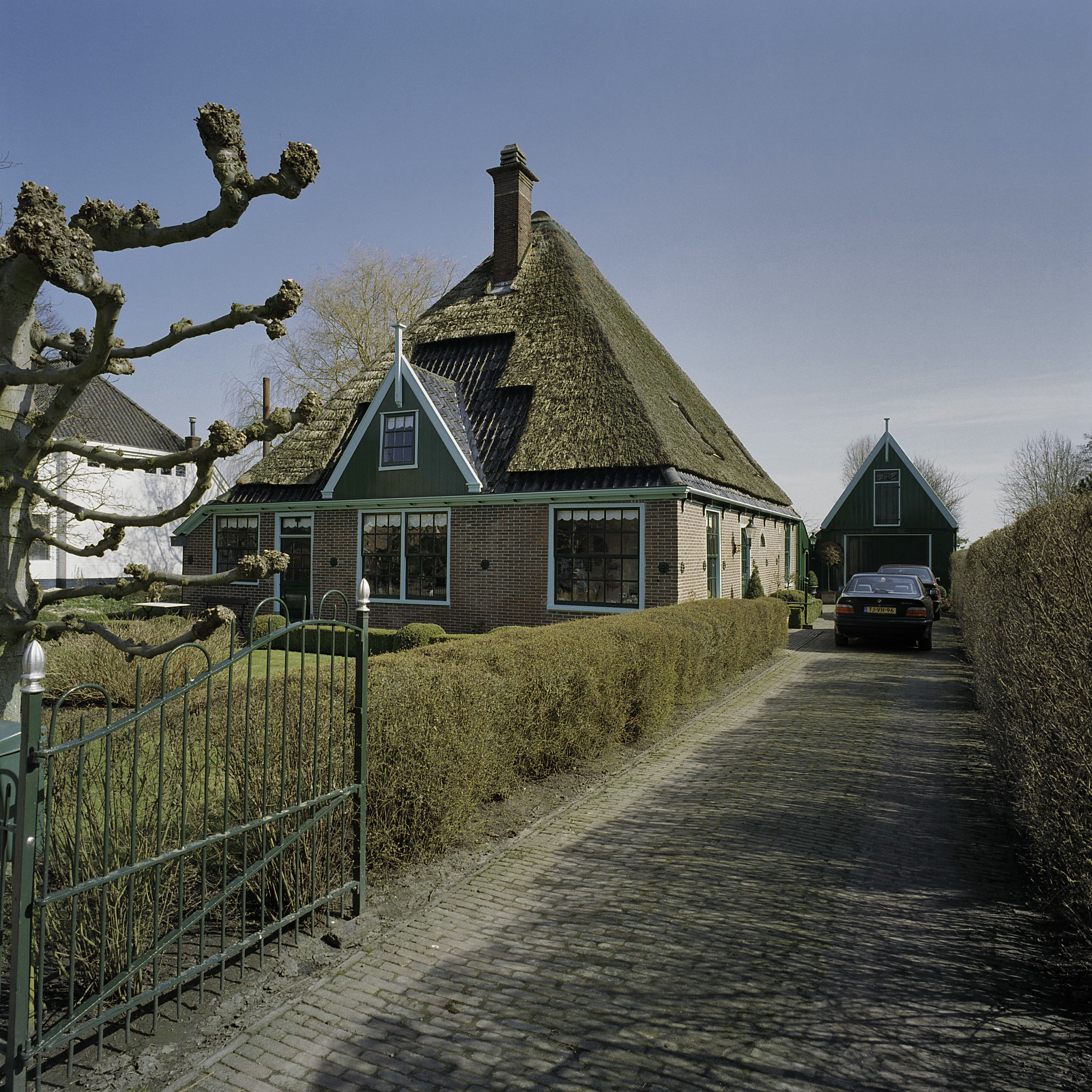
Farm in Wijdenes
