= Alice Besseling =

Dutch politician

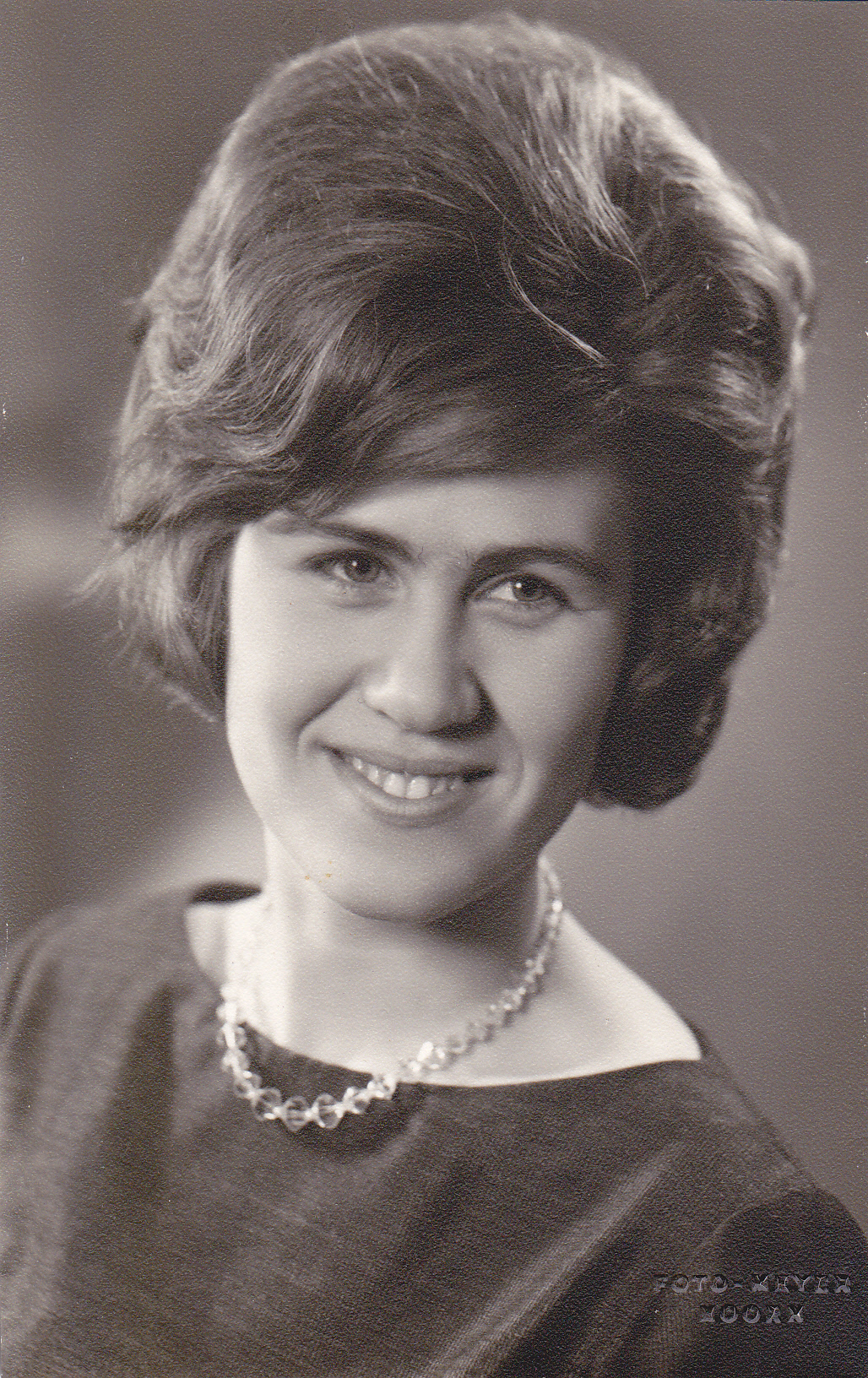
- Born: October 23, 1944; Venhuizen
- Died: January 22, 2014 (aged 69); Leiden
- Other name: Alida Cornelia Maria
- Political party: CDA
- Awards: Order of Orange-Nassau

Alida Cornelia Maria "Alice" Besseling (23 October 1944 – 22 January 2014) was a city council member for the CDA in the Dutch city of Alphen aan den Rijn, and a local and social activist who was instrumental in the recognition of the Jewish cemetery in her hometown. For her work on the city council, her advocacy of women in her political party, and her community activism she was made a member of the Order of Orange-Nassau in 2008.

== Biography ==
Alice Besseling was born into a Roman Catholic family in Hem, a small community in West-Friesland, in 1944. From a young age she was interested in governance, first in youth organizations and later in professional organizations – in 1971 she was working for IBM when the Dutch government passed legislation mandating works councils for larger corporations, and she became the first elected member of the IBM works council. After her marriage she moved to Alphen aan den Rijn, where in 1978 she was elected to the city council for the newly formed Christian Democratic Appeal, a centrist-right coalition of Christian parties. She served on the city council until 1990. During her tenure she was active in supporting weaker members of society; she claimed that "social policy is too important to leave to left-wing parties". With a neighbor, Anke Bakker, she spent fifteen years researching the abandoned and razed Jewish cemetery on the Aarkade in Alphen aan den Rijn, uncovering much of the local Jewish history in the process (later the topic of a book by Bakker). In 2012, the city turned the abandoned cemetery into a city park and placed a monument remembering the Jewish community. Besseling was a founding member of the local women's group for the CDA, and until her death she was a member of her party's provincial women's group. In 2008, her contributions to the community were rewarded with membership in the Order of Orange-Nassau.

After resigning from the Alphen city council, she worked for eleven years at the Centre for Law in the Information Society at Leiden University, and retired in 2010.

Other community activities in Alphen includes founding and serving as a board member of a dance club for elderly singles, as president of the local athletic association Avanti, and as lector in Alphen's St. Boniface church.
