= Hoogkarspel =

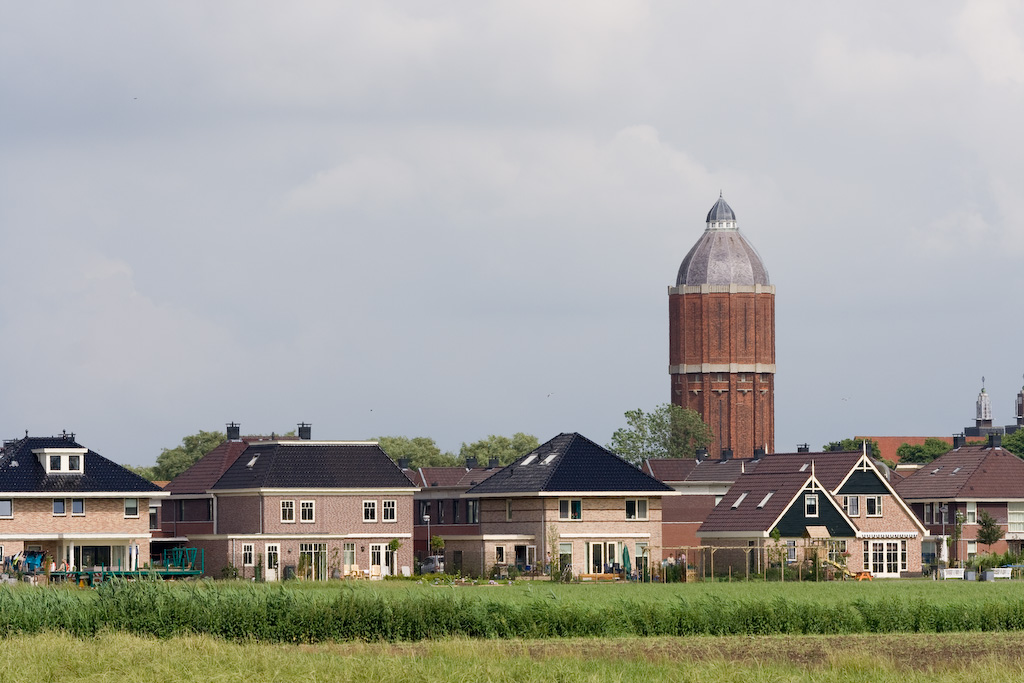
- The skyline of Hoogkarspel, with the characteristic Hoogkarspel Water Tower.

- Coat of arms

- Location in the Netherlands Location in the province of North Holland in the Netherlands
- Coordinates: 52°41′41″N 5°10′40″E
- Country: Netherlands
- Province: North Holland
- Municipality: Drechterland

Area
  - City: 8.89 km^{2} (3.43 sq mi)
- Elevation: −0.6 m (−2.0 ft)

Population (2025)
  - City: 8,725
  - Density: 981/km^{2} (2,540/sq mi)
  - Urban: 8,415
  - Rural: 310
- Time zone: UTC+1 (CET)
  - Summer (DST): UTC+2 (CEST)
- Postal code: 1616
- Dialing code: 0228

Hoogkarspel (West Frisian: Hougkarspel) is a village in the municipality Drechterland, located in the north west of the Netherlands, in the province of North Holland and the region of West-Frisia. The name derives from the words hoog (Dutch for "high") and kerspel, a Middle Dutch word for parish.

Hoogkarspel was a separate municipality until 1979, when it was merged into the new municipality of Bangert, which has been renamed to Drechterland in 1980.

== Transportation ==
There is a railway station, Hoogkarspel, with half-hourly connections to Hoorn, Amsterdam and Enkhuizen.

== Archeology ==
The so-called Hoogkarspel culture is an important part of the Elp culture, a culture of the Bronze Age dating from approx. 1800-800 BC. In the 1960s remains were found of a tumulus behind the Hoogkarspel water tower, and remains of an agricultural settlement were discovered in the 1970s, dating from 1000 BC. Two periods are identified, Hoogkarspel-I (1400-1100 cal BC) and Hoogkarspel-II (800-400 cal BC). Earthenware found in the area is divided into old and young, following the influential publication by R. W. Brandt in 1988.

South-west of the former "Medemblikker Tolhuis" (Medemblik tollbooth) remains of a mound from the late Bronze Age were found. The Medemblik tollbooth was a tollbooth next to a well maintained road to the city Medemblik, and this road still exists.
