= Rekvedbukta (Jan Mayen) =

Bay of Jan Mayen

Coordinates: 70°57.4′N 8°32.6′W

Rekvedbukta (English: Driftwood Bay) is an open bay on the central southern coast of the island of Jan Mayen, about eight nautical miles long.

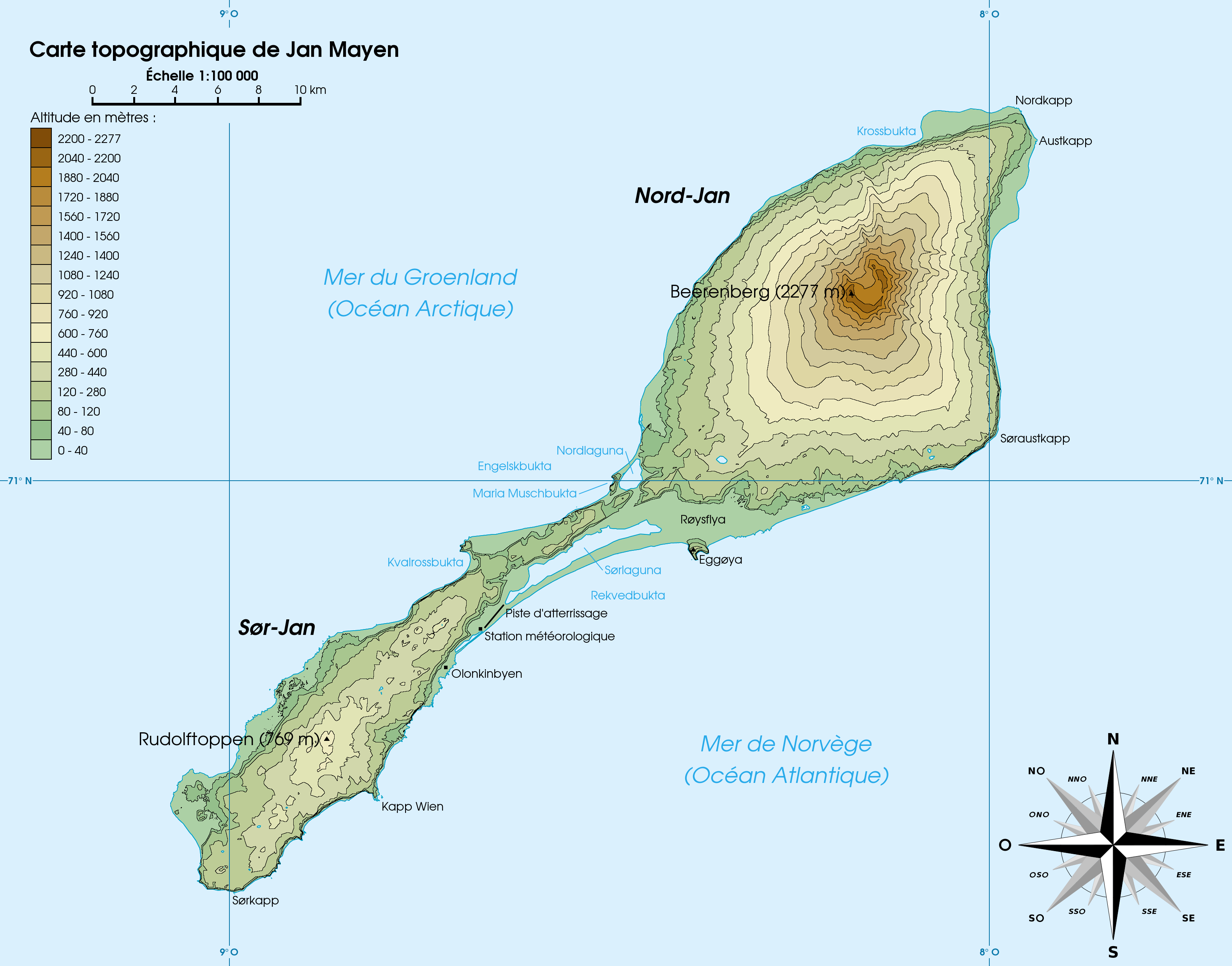
Map of Jan Mayen

== Geography ==
The bay extends from the point Kapp Traill to the south and northeastwards to the peninsula of Eggøya. It has a length of about eight nautical miles. The only inhabited site on Jan Mayen, Olonkinbyen, is located at the plain Trollsletta at the southern part of the bay. South of the settlement is the harbour Båtvika. The aerodrome Jan Mayensfield is located northeast of Olonkinbyen, along Rekvedbukta. Further northeast is the shallow elongated lake Sørlaguna, which can extend up to eight kilometers in the spring, separated from the bay by the sandy bar Lagunevollen. Eggøybukta at the northeastern part of the bay is a suitable harbour under favourable weather conditions. The bay contains the islet of Losbåten and the shoal Losbåtrevet to the southwest. In the northeastern part of the bay is the shoal Nansenflua, named after the ship HNoMS Fridtjof Nansen, which was wrecked and sank after striking the rock in November 1940.

== Name history ==
The oldest reference given by Orvin in his 1960 paper The place-names of Jan Mayen, is a description from 1614 by Dutch cartographer Joris Carolus. Carolus introduces the name Gouwenaers Bay after captain Jacob de Gouwenaer. In Joan Blaeu's Atlas Major sive Cosmographia Blaviana from 1662 the bay is called Groote Hout Bay, while in a publication from 1720 Zorgdrager uses the form Groote Hout baay. Other names used over the time are Grand Baye au Bois, Great Wood Bay, La baie du Grand-Bois, Treibholz Bucht, Rækved Bugt, Baie du Bois-flotté, Dirvtræbugt, Drivtømmerbugt, Driftwood Bay and Drivvedsbugten. The first part of the name Rekvedbukta means "driftwood", while bukt(a) means "bay", "bight" or "cove".
