= Nansenflua =

Undersea rock in Jan Mayen, Norway

- Undersea rock
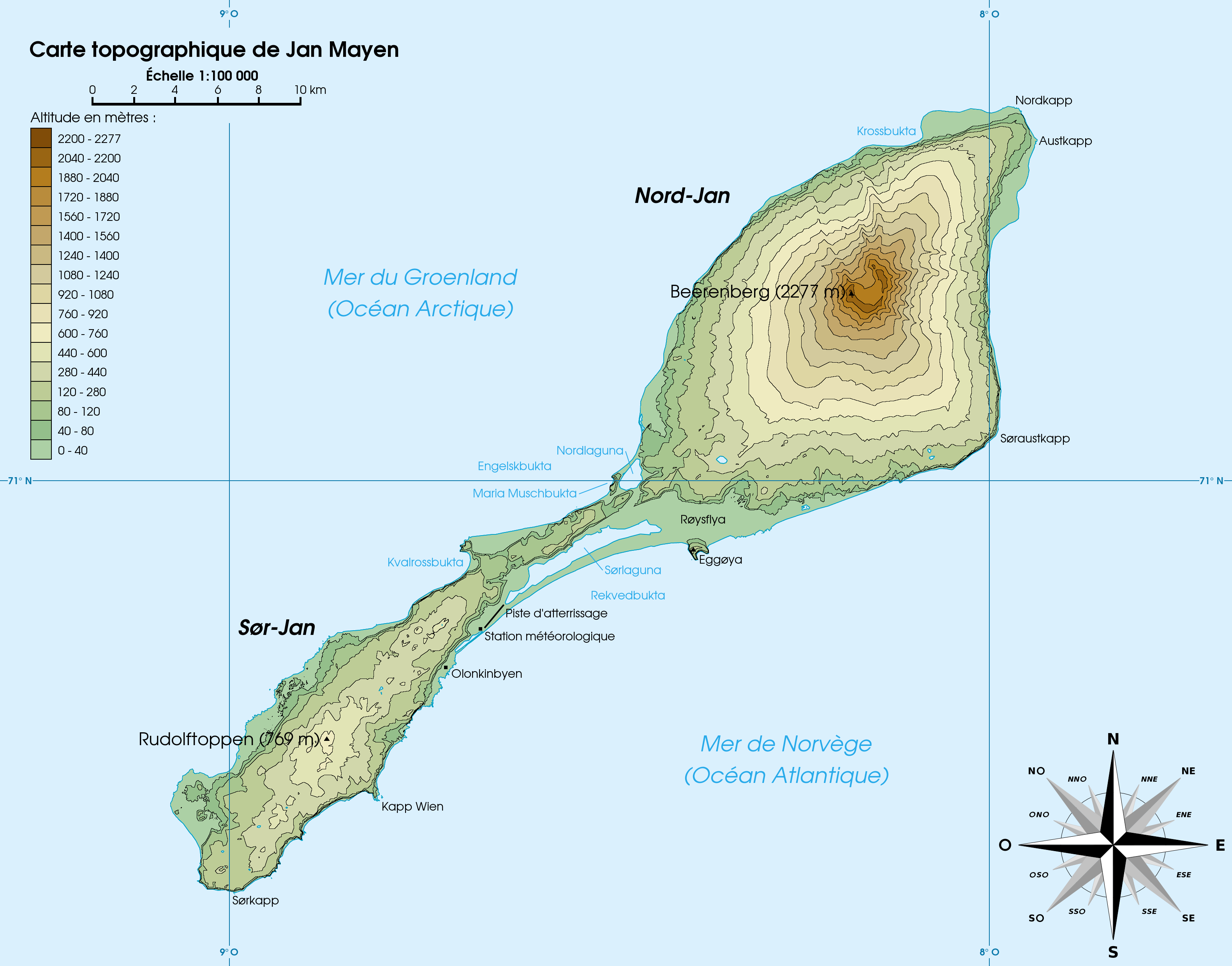
- Map of Jan Mayen
- Interactive map of Nansenflua
- Coordinates: 70°57′00″N 8°28′01″W
- Location: Rekvedbukta off the southeastern coast of Jan Mayen
- Elevation: −2 m (−6.6 ft)

Nansenflua is an undersea rock in the northern part of Rekvedbukta off the southeastern coast of Jan Mayen in the Arctic Ocean. The shoal is named after the ship HNoMS Fridtjof Nansen, which sank after striking the previously uncharted rock in November 1940. Nansenflua is the only obstruction in Rekvedbukta. The name Nansenflua was introduced in charts published by the Norwegian Polar Institute in 1955, and is included as a recognized name in Anders K. Orvin's 1960 paper The place-names of Jan Mayen. It follows a convention based on two then in force Orders in Council, dated 28 April 1933 and 31 May 1957, of using the Nynorsk grammatical form. The suffix "-a" in the feminine definite form was chosen, as no local dialect existed on Jan Mayen. The last part of the name, "flu(a)", means "rock awash", or "sunken rock". The geographical location is given by Orvin as 70°57′N 08°28′W, with an exactitude of 1'. The rock, located two meters under the surface, has a small top area and vertical sides of about twenty meters. It is located about one nautical mile from Eggøykalven and 1.7 nautical miles west-southwest of the peninsula Eggøya. In anything but completely calm weather conditions, Nansenflua is visible by waves being broken against it. The rock is part of the remains of a crater.

== Shipwreck of HNoMS Fridtjof Nansen ==
Under the command of the exiled Royal Norwegian Navy, the offshore patrol vessel HNoMS Fridtjof Nansen visited Jan Mayen in September 1940, in order to destroy and evacuate the weather station northeast of Eggøya. The ship returned in November of the same year to disrupt German plans to re-establish a weather station on the island. Entering the bay of Rekvedbukta on 8 November 1940 in calm weather, the ship collided with the hitherto unknown shoal, rapidly heeling 45°. The whole crew of 66 entered the lifeboats. The boats reached the shore during darkness, and by the next morning the ship had sunk. Four days later the shipwrecked crew was rescued by the naval trawler HNoMS Honningsvåg and brought to Iceland. The wreck of Fridtjof Nansen, which had a length of 72.8 m (238.85 ft) and a displacement of 1,275 short tons (1,157 t), is probably still located near the rock.
