= Eggøya =

Peninsula of Jan Mayen, Norway

Coordinates: 70.973°N 8.385°W

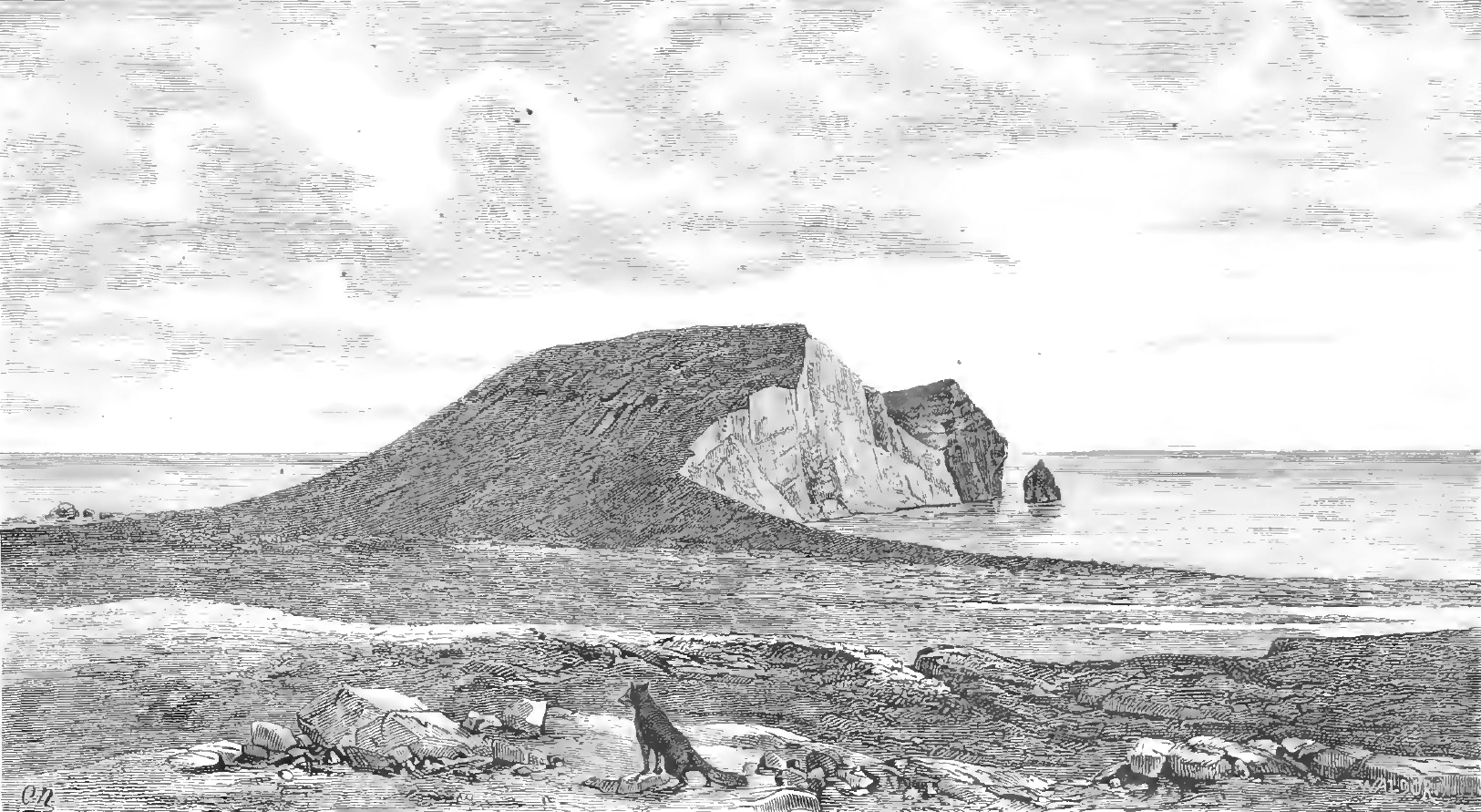
Eggøya in 1882, with Eggøykalven to the right

Eggøya ("Egg Island") is a peninsula of Jan Mayen island of the Arctic Ocean. It is located on the southern side, in the central part of the island, east of Sørlaguna, and defines the northeastern extension of the bay Rekvedbukta. To the west of the peninsula is the bay Eggøybukta, and to the east is the bay Jamesonbukta. The highest peak at the peninsula has a height of 217 m.a.s.l. Eggøya consists of the northern part of an old volcanic crater, and small hydrothermal vents are still present. The outer part of the peninsula forms the semicircular bay of Kraterbukta, facing south-southeast with steep slopes. To the south of the peninsula is a small islet, Eggøykalven.

== Name history ==
The name "Eggøya" indicates that the peninsula used to be an island. The oldest reference given by Orvin is Joan Blaeu's Atlas Major sive Cosmographia Blaviana from 1662, with the Dutch: Eyer Eylandt of vogel klippen. In the 1801 publication Histoire des peches, des decouvertes et des etablissements des hollandais dans les mers du nord by Bernhard de Reste, the peninsula was called Terre aux æufs. In his Jan Mayen description from 1820, William Scoresby used the name Egg Island. Carl Vogt's map Karte der Insel Jan Mayen from 1863 used the name Eierinsel. In his 1878 report from an expedition to Jan Mayen, Henrik Mohn used the name forms Ægoen, Eg-Øen and Æg-Øen. In his article "Jan Mayen Island" from 1922, James Wordie used the name Egg Bluff Crater.

== Incidents ==
In November 1940, during World War II, the ship HNoMS Fridtjof Nansen wrecked off Eggøya, when it hit an uncharted subsea rock, which was later named Nansenflua. The crew of 66 entered the lifeboats and reached the shore during darkness, two boats to the west of Eggøya, and two to the east. The ship had been on a mission to interrupt German plans to establish a weather station on Jan Mayen. Later, when a small garrison of Norwegian troops was established with headquarters near Nordlaguna, a guard's cottage was built on the northern slope of Eggøya.

== Historical maps ==
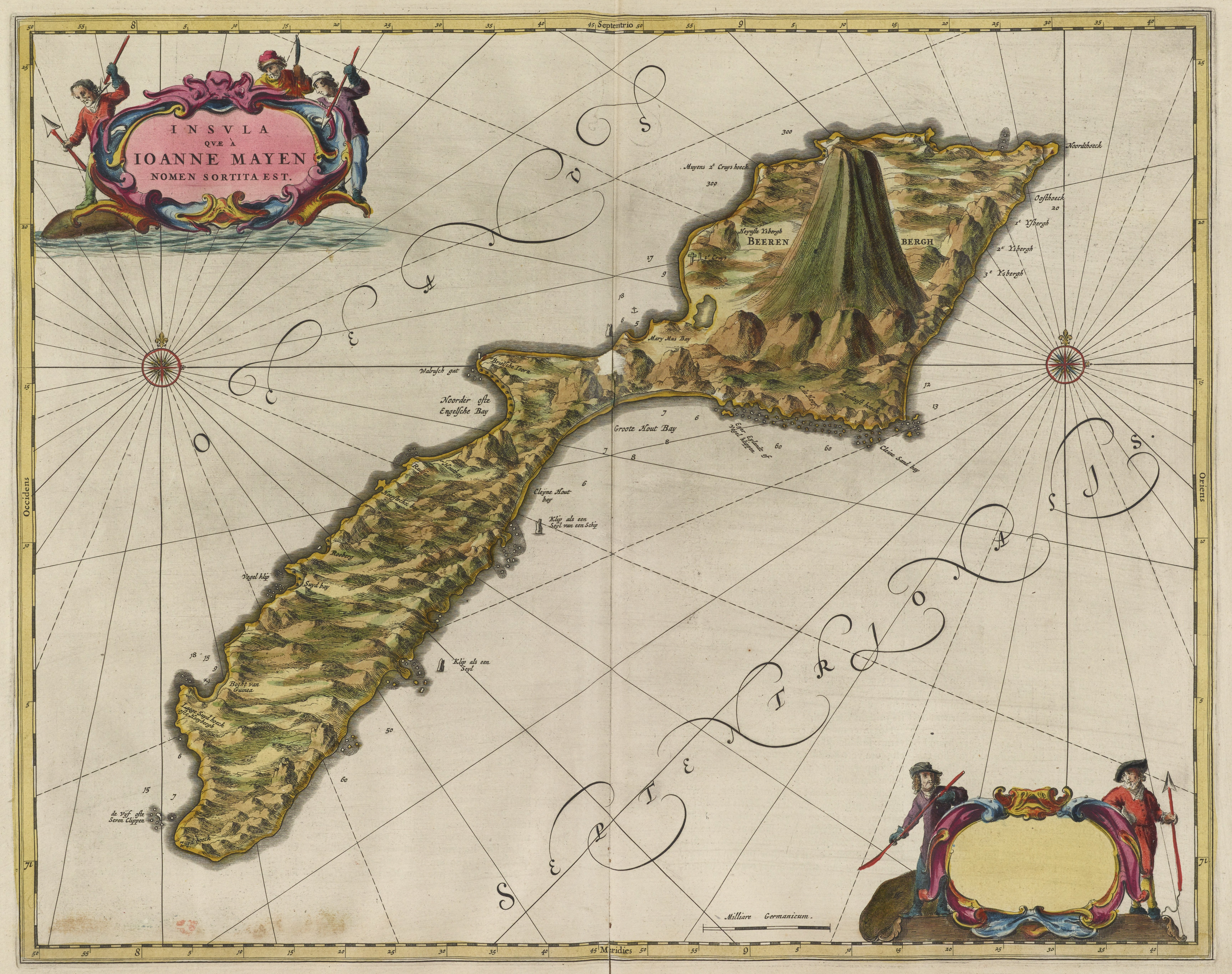
Insel Eyer Eylandt of Vogel klippen (Old Dutch) on Joan Blaeu's map of 1662

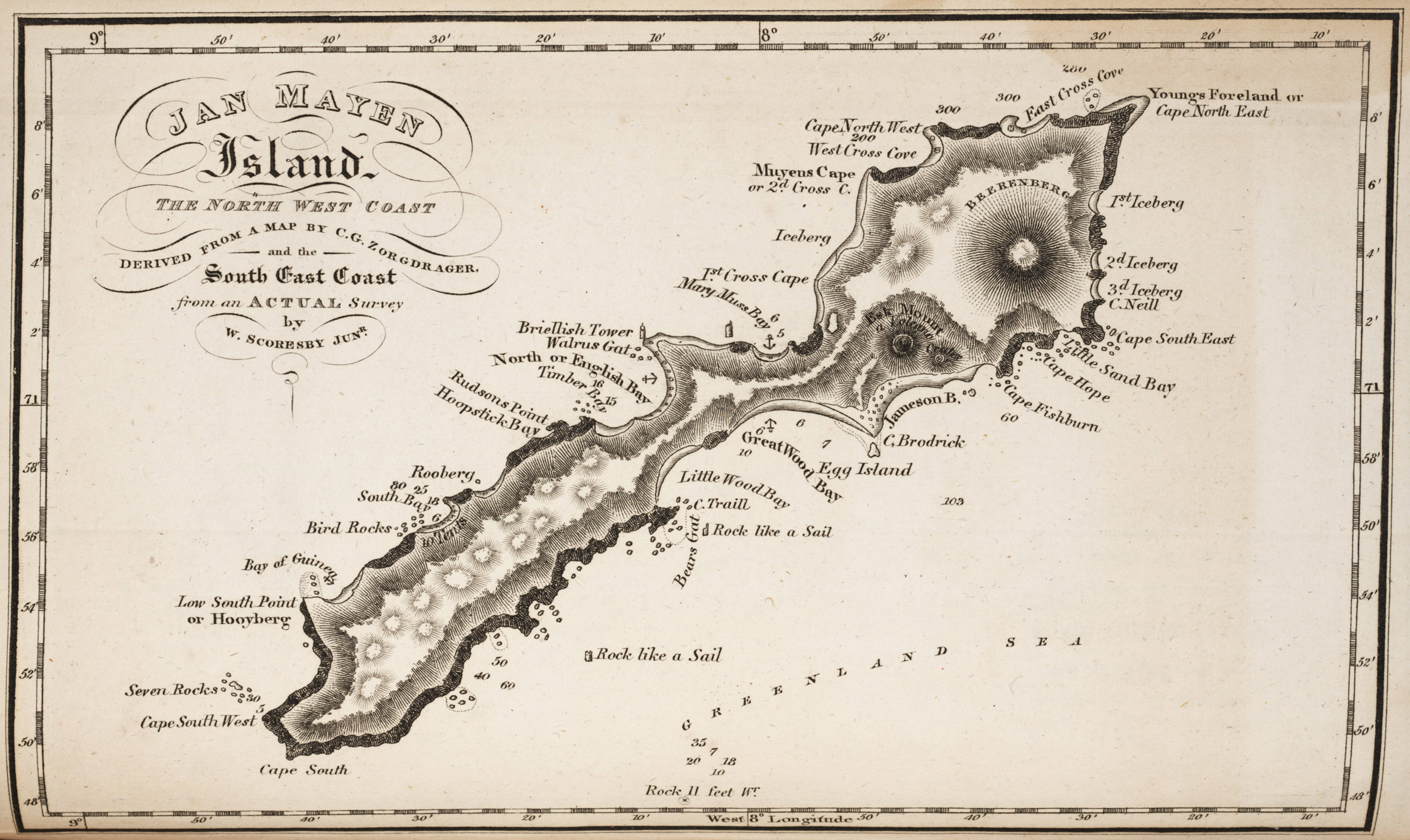
Scoresby's map of 1820 with Egg Island

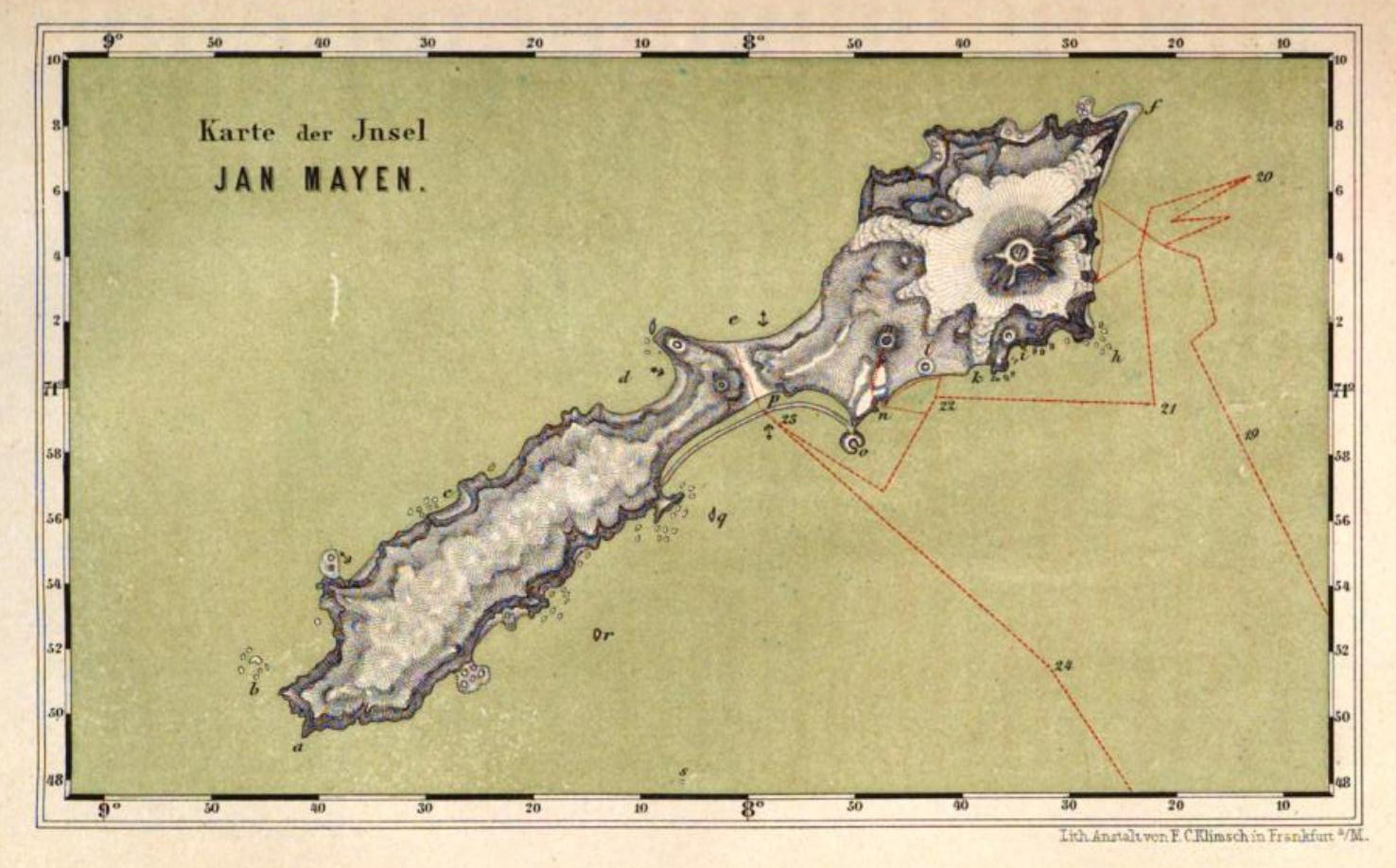
Carl Vogt 1863: Island turning peninsula

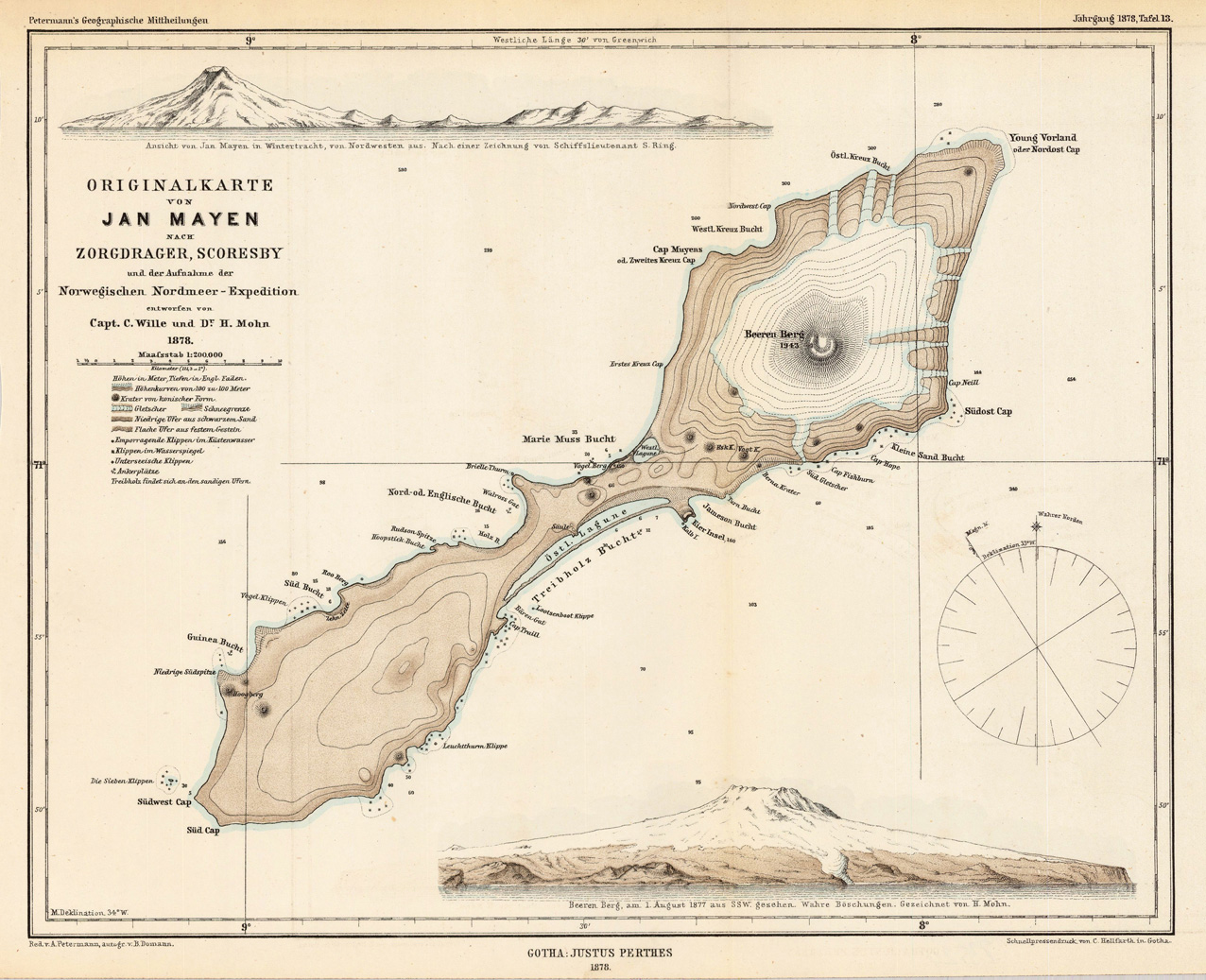
Eier Insel on German-language map drawn by Henrik Mohn is already a peninsula.
