= Trollsletta =

Coastal plain in Jan Mayen, Norway

Coordinates: 70.9215°N 8.7156°W

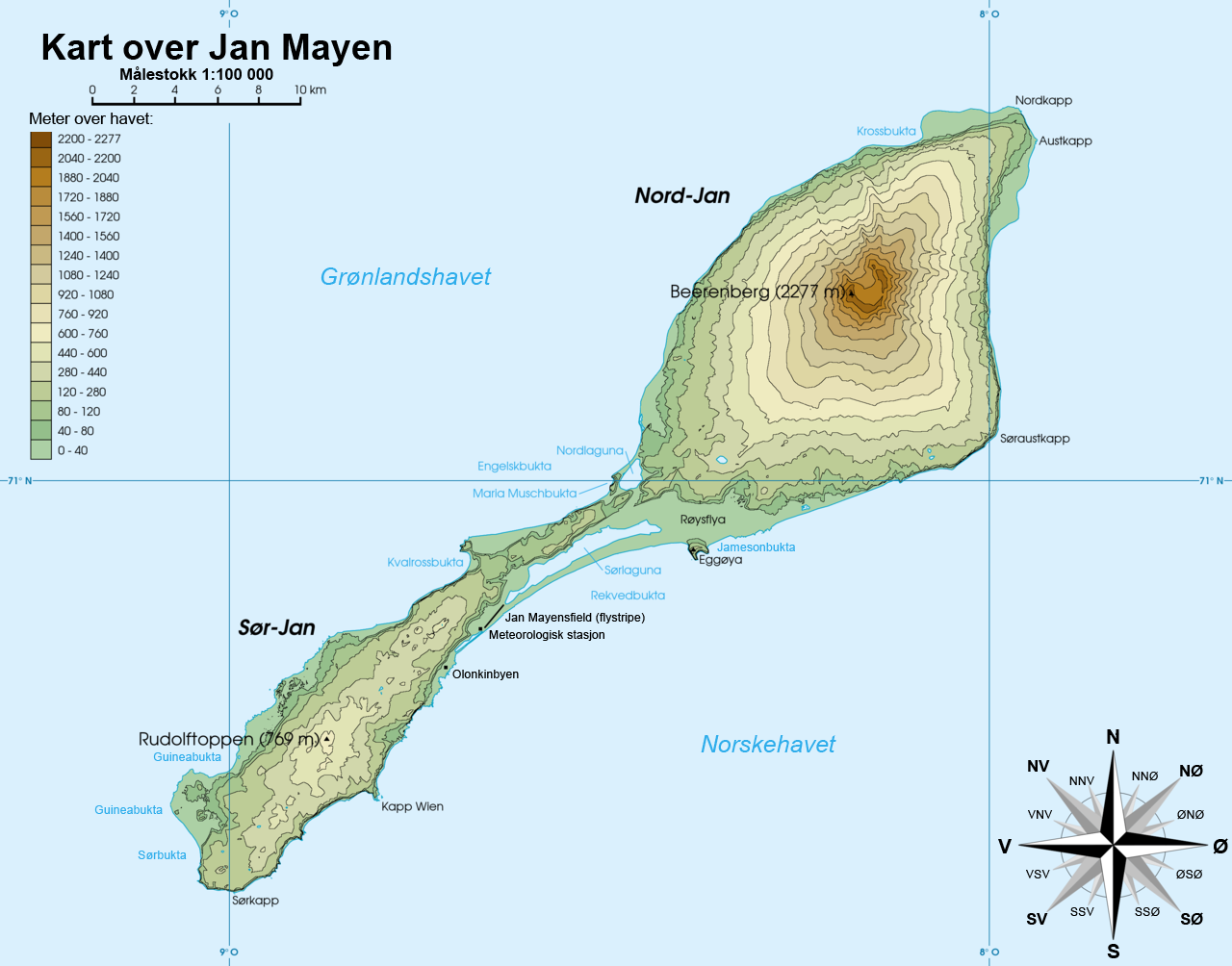
Trollsletta is located on the southern side of Jan Mayen

Trollsletta is a coastal plain on the North Arctic Ocean island of Jan Mayen.

It is located on the eastern coast and southern side of the island (Sør-Jan). It is inside the southwestern part of the bay Rekvedbukta, between Båtvika and Helenesanden. Trollsletta has a length of about 1,400 meters. The coast consists of low and splintered cliffs. Olonkinbyen is located at Trollsletta. The only settlement on Jan Mayen, Olonkinbyen consists of a weather station and the Norwegian Armed LORAN-C station.
