= German weather ship WBS 4 Hinrich Freese =

Ship built in 1930

History

Germany
- Name: Hinrich Freese
- Owner: Hanseatische Hochseefisherei AG (1930–40); Kriegsmarine (1940)
- Port of registry: (Weimar Republic) Bremerhaven, Germany (1930–35); (Nazi Germany) Bremerhaven, Germany (1935–40); (Nazi Germany) Kriegsmarine (1940)
- Builder: Deutsche Schiff- und Maschinenbau AG
- Yard number: 504
- Launched: 1930
- Completed: December 1930
- Commissioned: 1 March 1940
- Out of service: 16 November 1940
- Identification: Code Letters QVNT (1930–34); Code Letters DQOZ (1934–40); Fishing registration BX 215 (1930–40); WBS 4 (1940)
- Fate: Deliberately run ashore and wrecked to avoid capture, 16 November 1940

General characteristics
- Tonnage: 384 DWT, 140 NRT
- Length: 45.44 metres (149 ft 1 in)
- Beam: 7.67 metres (25 ft 2 in)
- Depth: 3.78 metres (12 ft 5 in)
- Installed power: Triple expansion steam engine, 92 nhp
- Propulsion: Single screw propeller
- Complement: 19, plus 5 meteorologists

Hinrich Freese was a fishing trawler built in 1930 by Deutsche Schiff- und Maschinenbau AG for the Hanseatische Hochseefisherei AG. She was requisitioned by the Kriegsmarine in 1940, serving until deliberately wrecked in November 1940 whilst being chased by the British cruiser HMS Naiad.

== Description ==
The ship was 45.44 metres (149 ft 1 in) long, with a beam of 7.67 metres (25 ft 2 in). She had a depth of 3.78 metres (12 ft 5 in). She was powered by a triple expansion steam engine of 92 nhp, driving a single screw propeller via a low pressure turbine. The engine was built by Deutsche Schiff- und Maschinenbau AG (Deschimag), Wesermünde.

== History ==
Hinrich Freese was built as yard number 504 by Deschimag, Wesermünde for the Hanseatische Hochseefisherei AG, being completed in December 1930. Her port of registry was Bremerhaven. The Code Letters QVNT, and fishing registration BX 215 were allocated. With the change of Code Letters in 1934, Hinrich Freese was allocated the letter DQOZ.

In 1940, Hinrich Freese was requisitioned by the Kriegsmarine. She was converted to a weather ship and was commissioned on 1 March as WBS 4 Hinrich Freese. Her complement was nineteen, plus five meteorologists. On 20 March, she departed from Wilhelmshaven to operate north of Iceland. The first weather reports were sent on 30 March. These were gathered in support of the auxiliary cruiser Atlantis, which was to break out of German waters into the Atlantic Ocean. WBS 3 Fritz Homann and WBS 5 Adolf Vinnen were also involved in this operation. She returned to Wilhelmshaven in mid-April.

on 24 May, Hinrich Freese sailed from Trondheim in German-occupied Norway to relieve Adolf Vinnen north of Iceland. From 18 August, she operated north of the Norwegian island of Jan Mayen, in support of the cruisers Admiral Hipper and Admiral Scheer. Adolf Vinnen and Fritz Homann were also involved in this operation.

Hinrich Freese sailed from Trondheim on 19 October for Jan Mayen. She was to operate in support of Admiral Scheer, which was to transit the Denmark Strait to reach the Atlantic Ocean. On 29 October, a Heinkel He 115 seaplane crashed on landing at Jan Mayen. Her crew were rescued by Hinrich Freese. A second He 115 was wrecked in a storm that night and the mission was cancelled. Hinrich Freese returned to Trondheim with the four Luftwaffe personnel from the aircraft.

Hinrich Freese sailed from Trondheim on 12 November for Jan Mayen, arriving four days later. She was carrying a total of 24 men. She was spotted by HMS Naiad off Jamesonbukta. HMS Naiad gave chase; realising that she could not outrun the cruiser, her captain deliberately ran her ashore at high speed on the Søraustkapp, wrecking the ship with the loss of two lives. The survivors were rescued by the trawlers HMT Elm and HMT Wistaria. They served the rest of the war as prisoners of war, although one of them was killed in a German air raid on Woolwich, London on 28 January 1941.
