= Gouwenaerbåen =

Reef

Coordinates: 70°57.9′N 8°19.9′W

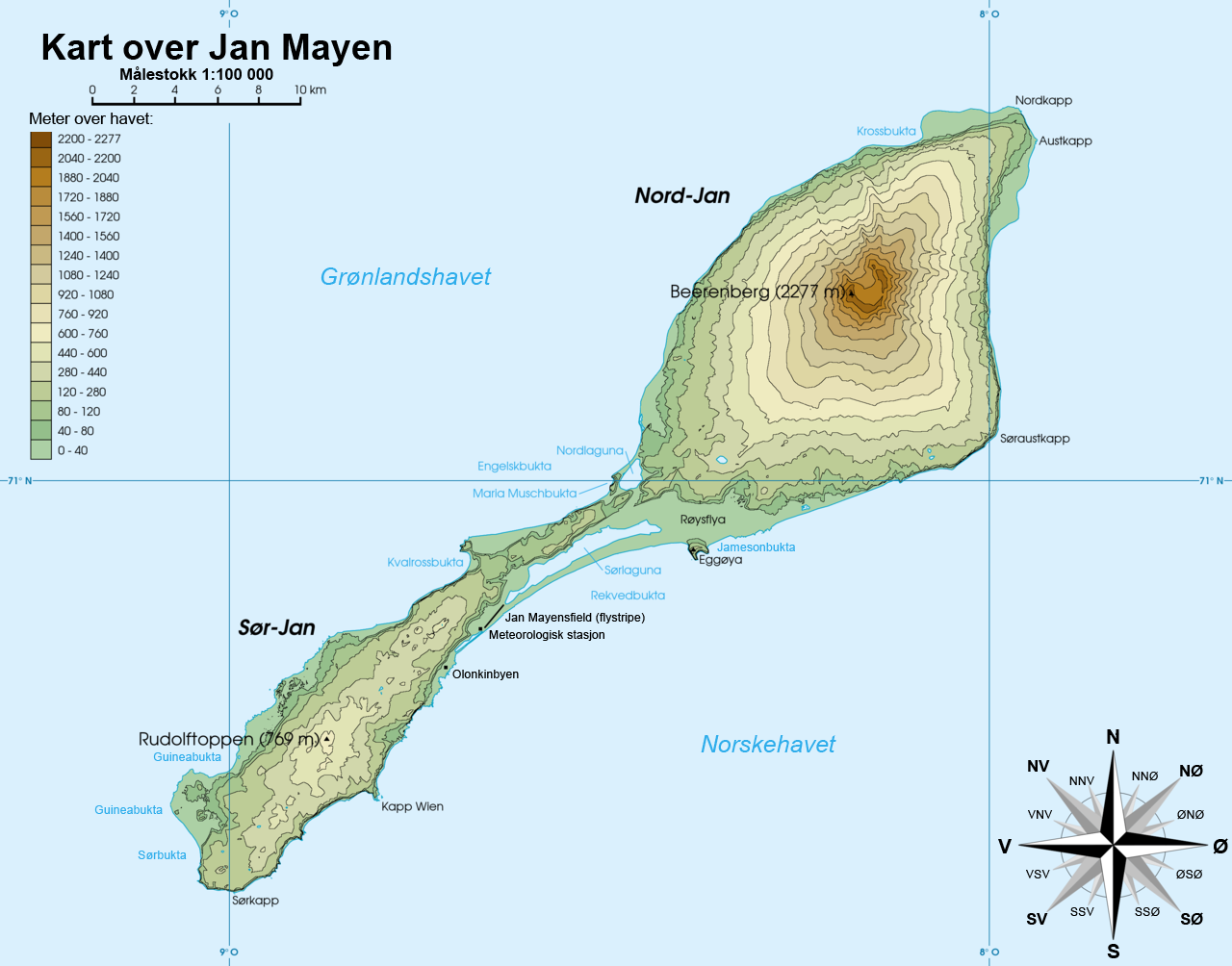
Map of Jan Mayen

Gouwenaerbåen (English: Gouwenaer Reef) is a 10 m (33 ft) shoal or reef southeast of Eggøya, on the southern coast of the island of Jan Mayen. It is named after the Dutch seafarer Jacob de Gouwenaer, who was master of the Orangienboom in 1614, when he had first come upon the island (although he had been preceded by another Dutch expedition as well as a French one the same year). His name had originally been attached to Rekvedbukta.
