= Kapp Traill =

Headland on Jan Mayen, Norway

Coordinates: 70.9058°N 8.7341°W

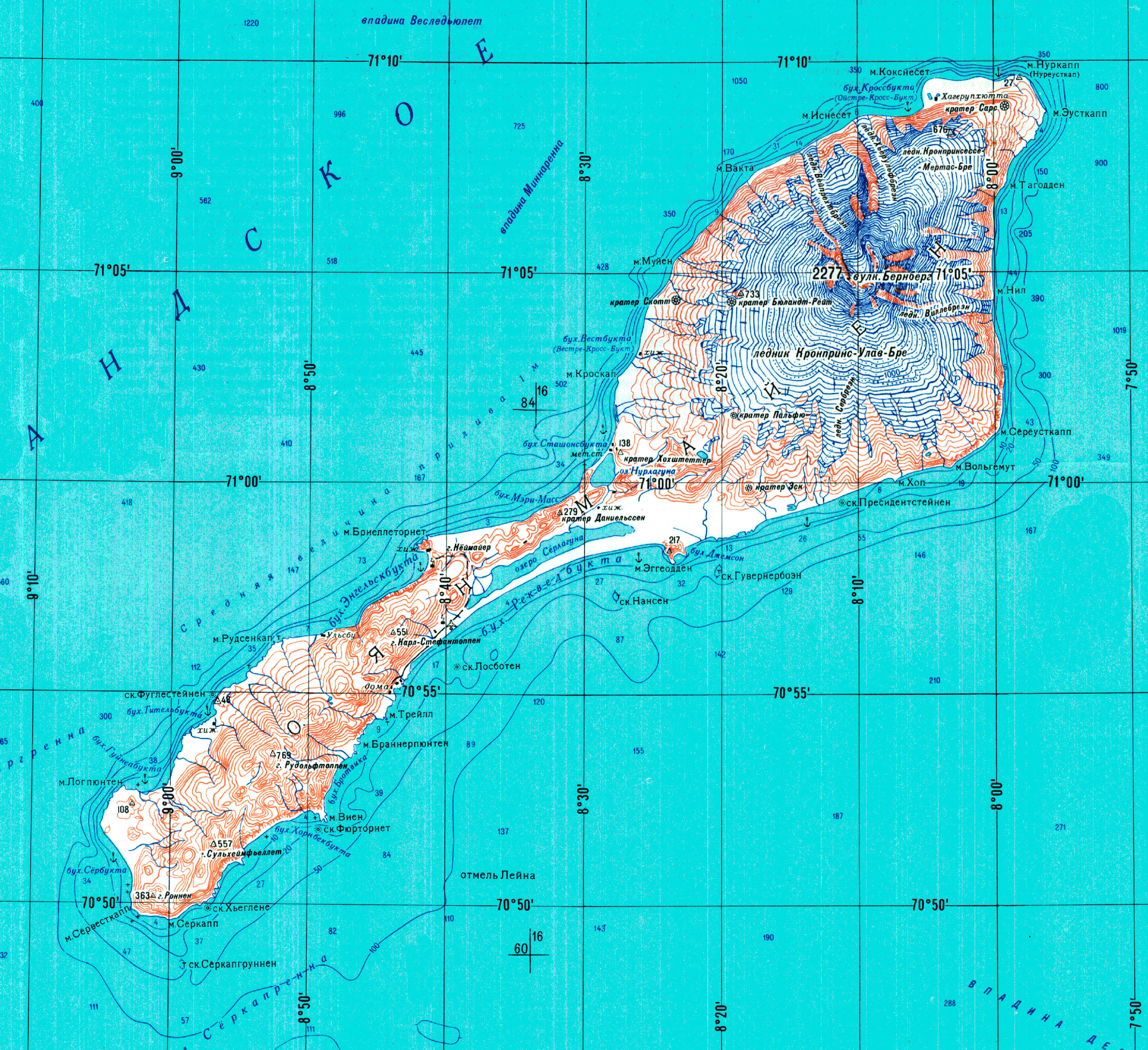
Topographic map of Jan Mayen

Kapp Traill is a headland at the southern part of the island of Jan Mayen. It defines the southwestern extension of the bay Rekvedbukta, at the southeast side of the island. The distance between Kapp Traill and Kapp Wien further southwest is about three nautical miles. The point is named after British zoologist Thomas Stewart Traill.
