= Hornbækbukta =

Bay in Norway

Coordinates: 70.8600°N 8.8583°W

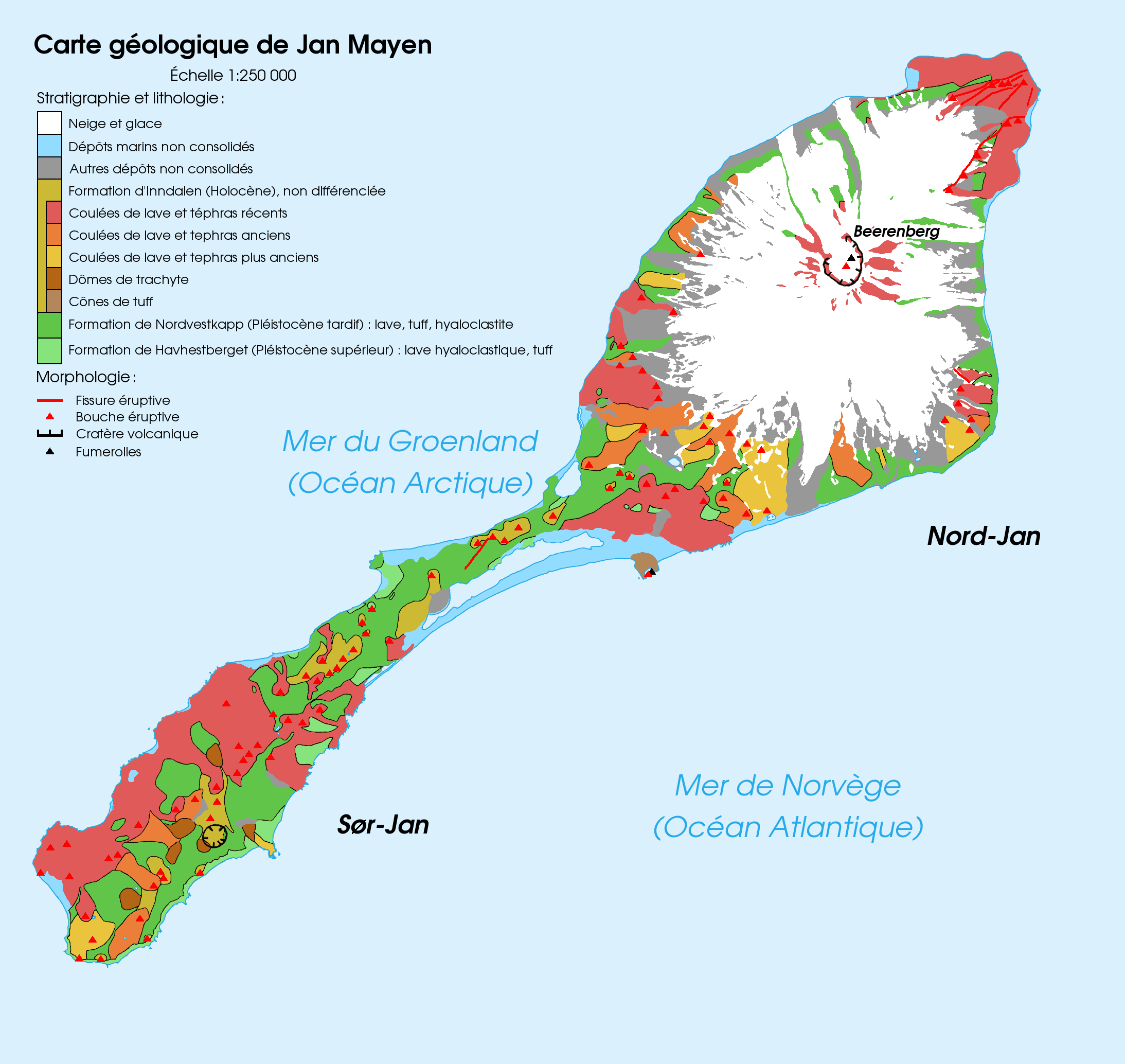
Map of Jan Mayen

Hornbækbukta is a bay at the southeastern side of the Norwegian island of Jan Mayen. It has a width of 2.2 kilometers, and extends from the headland of Fugleodden to the southwest, to Kapp Wien to the northeast. The bay is named after hydrographer Helge Hornbæk.
