= Eggøykalven =

Island in Jan Mayen, Norway

Coordinates: 70.9678°N 8.3925°W

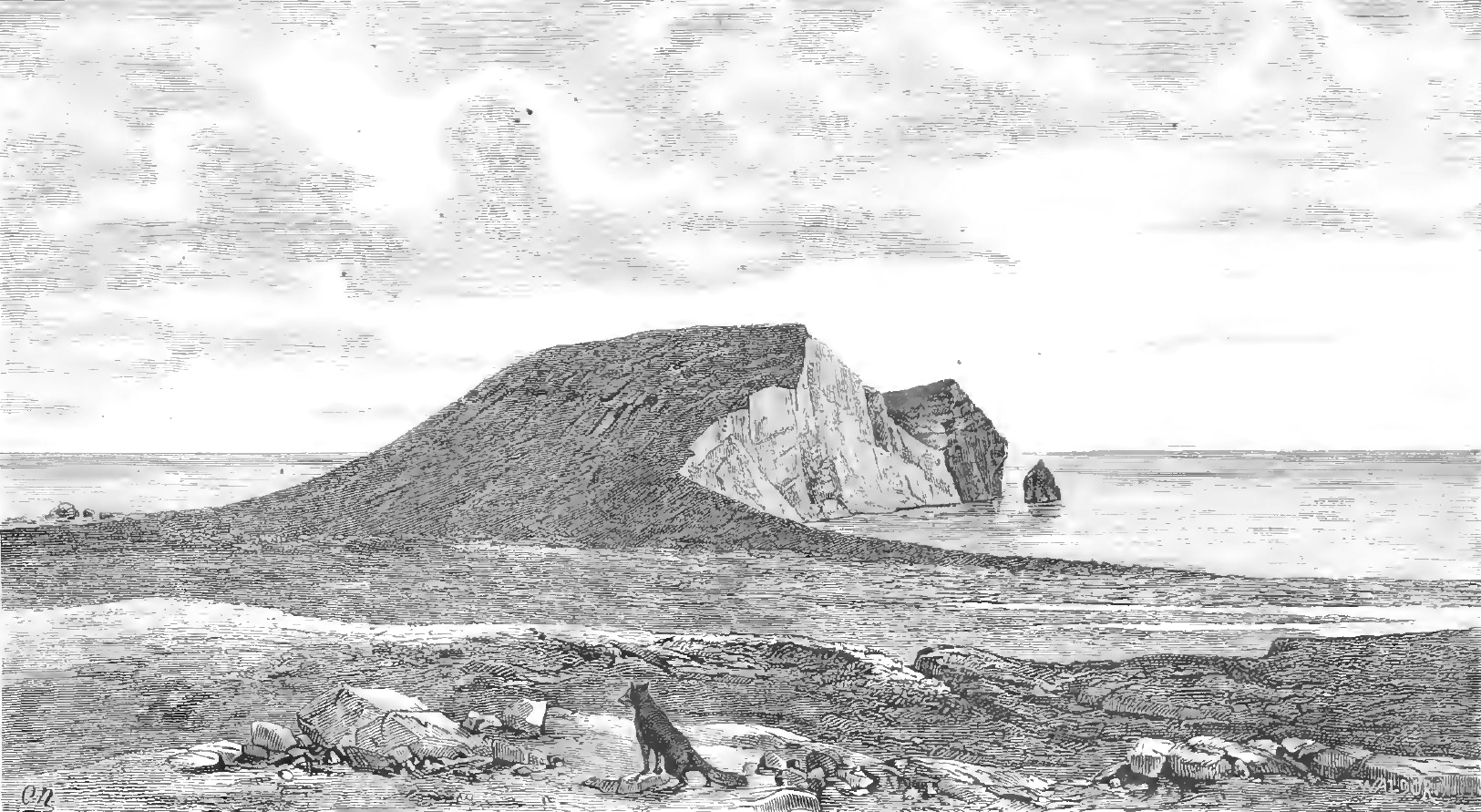
Eggøya in 1882, with Eggøykalven to the right

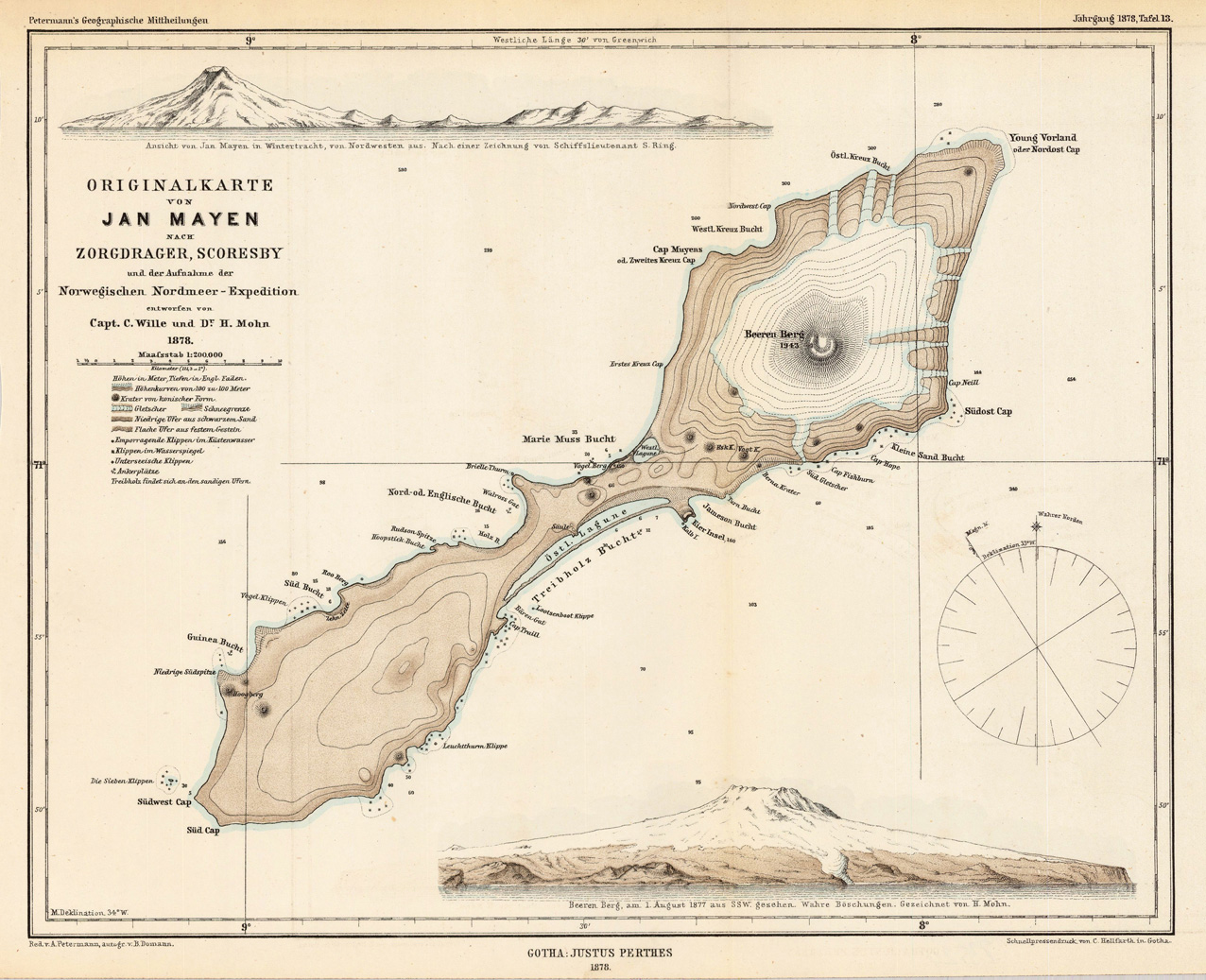
Kalb I beside Eier Insel on German-language map drawn by Henrik Mohn

Eggøykalven ("Egg Island Calf") is an islet south of the peninsula of Eggøya at the southern part of Jan Mayen. It is located just about 80 meters west of the point of Eggøyodden, and southeast of the bay Eggøybukta. The islet was earlier much higher, but has been significantly worn down by the ocean.
