= Kapp Wien =

Headland on Jan Mayen, Norway

Coordinates: 70.8660°N 8.8069°W

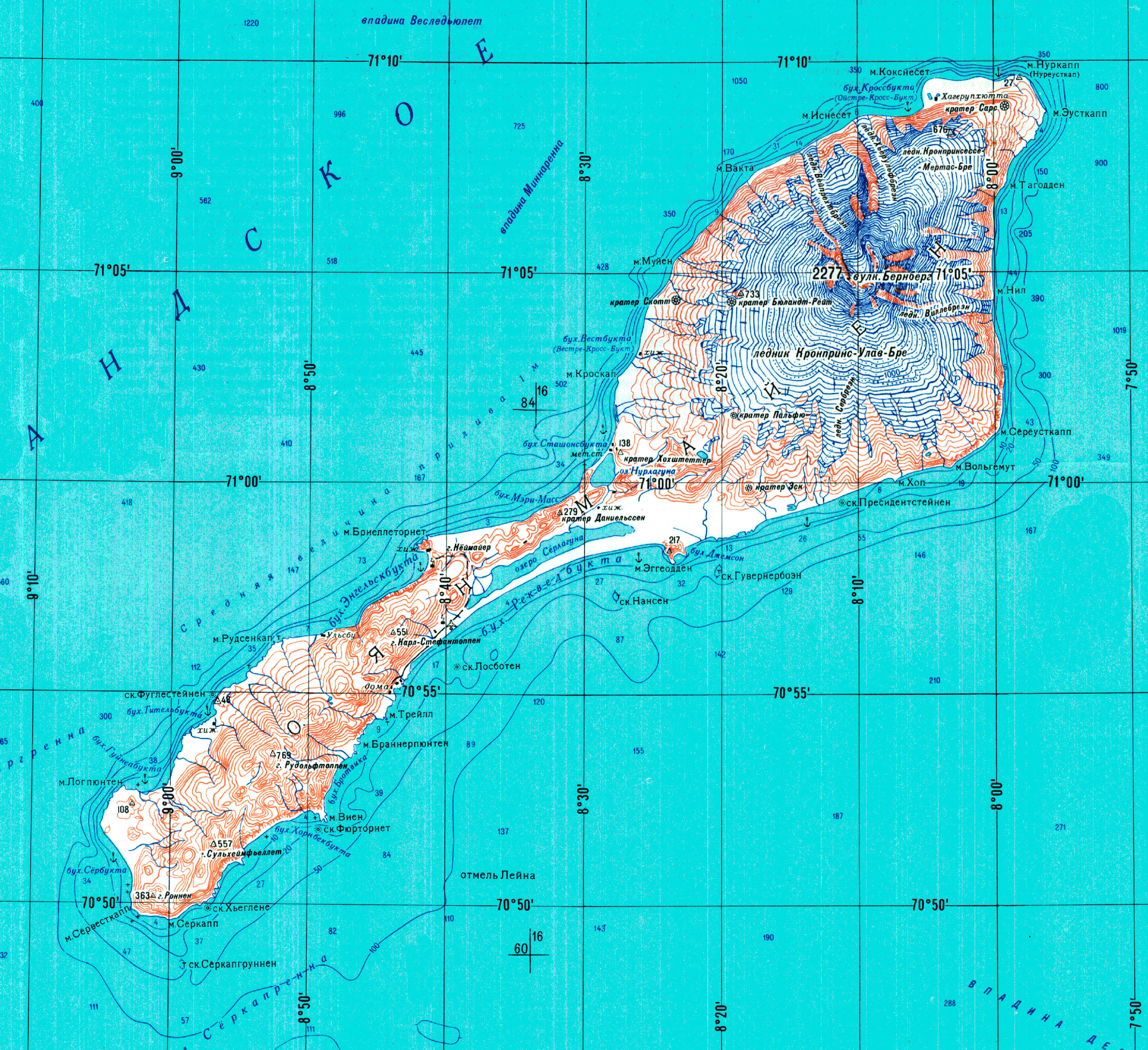
Topographic map of Jan Mayen

Kapp Wien is a headland at the southeastern side of the island of Jan Mayen, about halfway between Olonkinbyen and Sørkapp. It defines the northeastern extension of the bay Hornbækbukta.
