= HNoMS Honningsvåg =

Naval trawler

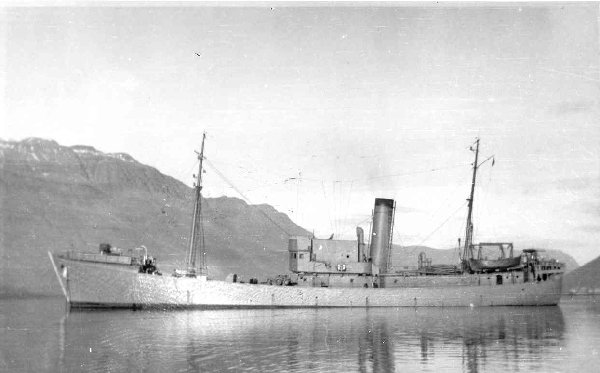
- Honningsvåg off Iceland

History

Germany
- Name: Malangen
- Builder: G. Seebeck A.G. at Wesermünde (present-day Bremerhaven), part of Deutsche Schiff- und Maskinenbau A-G Werk
- Yard number: 645
- Launched: February 1940
- Captured: by Norwegian militia on 13 April 1940

Norway
- Name: Honningsvåg
- Namesake: Port of Honningsvåg
- Acquired: 13 April 1940
- Commissioned: 23 April 1940
- Decommissioned: 22 August 1946
- Fate: Sold to civilian interests in 1947, scrapped in 1973

Service record
- Commanders: Lieutenant A. E. T. Plyhn
- Operations: Norwegian Campaign; Battle of the Atlantic
- Victories: 1 ship (192 tons) sunk

General characteristics
- Tonnage: 487 gross register tons
- Length: 177.2 ft (54.01 m)
- Beam: 27.5 ft (8.38 m)
- Draft: 16.3 ft (4.97 m)
- Installed power: 1,000 ihp (750 kW)
- Propulsion: 1 × shaft; 1 × Triple-expansion steam engine
- Speed: 11 knots (20 km/h; 13 mph)
- Range: 5,000 nmi (9,300 km; 5,800 mi) at 10 knots (19 km/h; 12 mph)
- Armament: Norwegian Campaign: 1 × 47 mm gun; 2 × 12.7 mm Colt Browning AA machine guns; After UK rebuild: 1 × QF 4 in Mk XII gun; 1 × 2 pounder "pom-pom" autocannon; 4 × 12.7 mm Colt Browning AA machine guns; 50 × 450 lb depth charges with two throwers
- Notes: All the above listed information, unless otherwise noted, was acquired from

HNoMS Honningsvåg was a naval trawler that served throughout the Second World War as a patrol boat in the Royal Norwegian Navy. She was launched at the North Sea harbour of Wesermünde in Hanover, Germany in February 1940 as the fishing trawler Malangen and was captured by Norwegian militiamen at the North Norwegian port of Honningsvåg during her maiden fishing journey to the Barents Sea. Having taken part in the defence of Norway in 1940 she spent the rest of the war years patrolling the ocean off Iceland. She was decommissioned in 1946, sold to a civilian fishing company in 1947 and scrapped in 1973.

== German career ==
Malangen was launched in February 1940 with the designation PG 550 for the trawler company Norddeutsche Hochseefischerei AG. At this early point in the war the Kriegsmarine had not yet begun requisitioning all new trawlers and Malangen was used as an ordinary fishing vessel.

=== Maiden voyage and capture ===
On 27 March 1940 the Malangen departed Wesermünde on her maiden voyage to the fishing grounds of the Barents Sea. While she operated off Norway the German invasion of that country began. As she attempted to make her way back to Germany Malangen entered the port of Honningsvåg in the Norwegian Finnmark county on 13 April.

When the German trawler entered the small port she was swiftly boarded by a locally raised guard unit led by løytnant (Lieutenant, Junior Grade) C. A. Carlsen and seized before the crew could set off the two scuttling charges they had placed in the engine room. This was the second German trawler the Honningsvåg riflemen had captured; two days previously they had seized control of the München of "Nordsee" Deutsche Hochseefischerei AG. The German sailors were later transferred to a prisoner-of-war camp at Vardøhus Fortress by the 1,382 ton Norwegian steamer Nova, arriving on 24 April. The sailors were transferred on the Nova to Skorpa prisoner of war camp in Troms on 13 May 1940 and released from captivity on 12 June, after the Norwegian capitulation.

== Royal Norwegian Navy service ==
=== Norwegian Campaign ===
On 23 April 1940, ten days after the capture of Malangen, the Royal Norwegian Navy fenrik (Ensign) A. E. T. Plyhn assumed command of the trawler. Since her capture the ship had been renamed Honningsvåg in honour of the port in which she was captured and had a 47 mm gun installed. Her first mission in Norwegian service was to sail south to the city of Bodø in Nordland county for further orders.

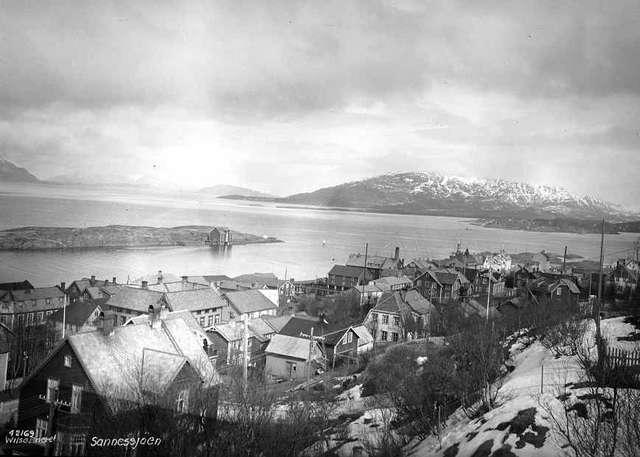
The port of Sandnessjøen where Honningsvåg was based for much of the Norwegian Campaign.

==== Operations in Nordland ====
After Honningsvåg arrived at Bodø the naval district commander there stationed the trawler at Sandnessjøen for local patrol missions. While stationed in Sandnessjøen fenrik Plyhn was promoted to løytnant. In April and May 1940 Honningsvåg was one of two Norwegian naval vessels patrolling the southern coastline of Helgeland, keeping German forces away from the coastal areas even as they advanced northwards along Norwegian national road 50 further inland towards Narvik. The other warship on the Helgeland coast was the 192 ton requisitioned local steamer HNoMS Heilhorn

===== Aiding British landings =====
On 9 May the British troopship Royal Watch arrived at Bodø carrying a 600 men-strong force of two companies codenamed Scissorforce to help block the German advance northwards from Trondheim. Honningsvåg, two local coastal steamers and three fishing vessels were assigned to help land the British forces. By the morning of 10 May all the British soldiers and their equipment had been brought ashore by the Norwegian vessels.

===== Capturing German air crews =====
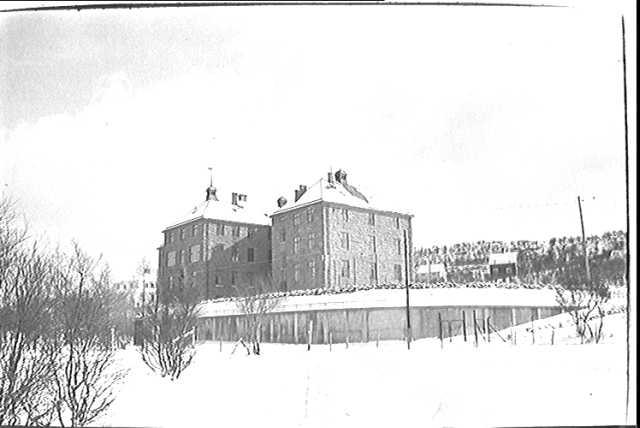
Sandnessjøen Hospital, where wounded German prisoners were treated in 1940

14 May saw Honningsvåg being despatched to the Vefsnfjorden to deal with a German twin-engined seaplane that was grounded on the shoreline near Kvalnes at the island of Alsta. When Honningsvåg arrived on the scene the crew found that since the aircraft had landed a local militia unit had attacked the Germans, killing one and capturing the other two crew members, one of whom had been wounded. The seaplane was found to be loaded with tins of food that were probably destined for the surrounded German forces at Narvik. Honningsvåg loaded the aircraft's machine guns and ammunition as well as the food cargo and brought the German airmen with her back to Sandnessjøen. The dead German was handed over to Sandnessjøen Hospital while the two prisoners were taken into police custody. HNoMS Honningsvåg proceeded to Dalsvåg on the island of Dønna and was anchored there when five German bombers attacked Sandnessjøen later in the day.

On 15 May a German land aircraft made an emergency landing in Alstahaug Municipality where it was approached by a local militia force. After the German aircrew refused to surrender, the Norwegians opened fire, wounding one of the crew and forcing the four airmen to capitulate. The wounded German was brought to the hospital in Sandnessjøen while the other three were taken by fishing boat to a prisoner-of-war camp.

Honningsvåg became involved in the episode later the same day when a Heinkel He 59 D-AKUK, an ambulance seaplane of the German Seenotflugkommando 1 (Sea Emergency Command 1), responded to emergency calls that the downed German aircrew had made before being captured. At Alstahaug the German officer in charge of the rescue operation, Oberstleutnant Branger, was told by the local population that the crew of the German aircraft had been moved and that there were German wounded and prisoners in nearby Sandnessjøen.

After encountering rifle fire from armed guards at the Alstahaug plane wreck Branger decided to continue on to Sandnessjøen to free the wounded Germans held there. Landing at Sandnessjøen at 1730hrs, Branger and an Unteroffizier armed themselves and went to the hospital where they demanded the release of the wounded Germans held there. Although the chief physician refused to release the Germans the police commissioner at nearby Nesna ordered him to comply with the Germans' demands. While the Germans attempted to gain the release of their comrades Honningsvåg arrived at Sandnessjøen. Løytnant Plyhn contacted the district commander in Bodø and was ordered to seize the He 59 and capture the Germans. Oberstleutnant Branger and the Unteroffizier were the first to be taken prisoner, while the two Germans remaining with the seaplane refused to budge and stayed on board until Plyhn approached them alone and after firing a warning shot took them prisoner. The captured Germans were handed over to the police. The He 59 proved impossible to remove due to low tide. After attempts to pull it free had damaged the pontoons and wings beyond repair, it was towed out on the Leirfjorden and sunk on 18 May.

===== The Albion =====
The next engagement involving Honningsvåg occurred four days later, on 19 May. The SS Albion, a 192-ton fishing trawler seized by the Germans at Trondheim, had landed 25 German soldiers at Rørvik on 18 May and continued northwards with a cargo of food and other supplies. The cargo was intended to be landed at Mosjøen or Mo i Rana, to supply troops of the German 2nd Mountain Division that were advancing northwards in the direction of Narvik. Albion's mission came nine days after the Germans had successfully used the Norwegian Hurtigruten passenger-cargo vessel Nordnorge to land troops in Hemnesberget on 10 May and bypass strong Allied defensive lines in Nordland. Before Albion could reach her designation she was spotted by civilian observers on Mount Sundsfjellet in Vik, who reported her to Norwegian authorities. Honningsvåg and Heilhorn were ordered on 19 May by the commander at Bodø to intercept and sink the armed German-operated steamship. By the evening of 19 May the Norwegian warships found Albion riding at anchor at the Strømøyene islands some 5 nautical miles (9.3 km) north of Brønnøysund. Locals in rowing boats met the Norwegian warships and told them where to find the Albion. After Honningsvåg had closed to less than 1,000 metres (3,300 ft), Heilhorn to even less of a distance, the Norwegians opened fire at around 2200hrs and sank Albion. The German crew jumped overboard, swam ashore, and were quickly captured by a waiting militia unit of volunteers from Brønnøysund and Velfjord Municipality. Of the ten Germans crewing the Albion two were killed and one wounded. The prisoners and the dead bodies were handed over to Honningsvåg for transportation to Sandnessjøen where they arrived in the early hours of 20 May. A Norwegian pilot was also rescued from the sunken ship. While the Norwegian pilot accompanied the warships back to Bodø, the German prisoners were handed over to a Royal Navy destroyer the Norwegian ships encountered off Sandnessjøen. The Albion was the last German blockade runner to attempt to break through the coastal areas under Norwegian control, with parts of the Helgeland coastline remaining unoccupied until early June.

===== Air attacks =====
As the Norwegian Campaign continued and work on the German airfield at Værnes in Central Norway progressed with the help of some 2,000 Norwegian collaborationist workers, attacks by the Luftwaffe increased in number and intensity.

Honningsvåg was subjected to her first attack on 20 May when she was strafed by a single German aircraft while out on patrol in the Ranafjorden, suffering no damage. The next day Sandnessjøen was bombed while Honningsvåg was nearby. This time also being attacked with bombs, as well as strafed, Honningsvåg made evasive manoeuvres and returned fire with her two anti-aircraft machine guns. Suffering minor damage from machine gun hits, she had her first casualty of the war when one of her gunners was lightly wounded.

The following days saw steadily increasing German air activity and Honningsvåg was bombed and strafed repeatedly. Skilled manoeuvring and good gunners enabled the trawler to avoid direct hits until she evacuated the area on 24 May. Being completely out of machine gun ammunition, and suffering from major leaks after several near misses from bombs, Honningsvåg sailed to Harstad where she was placed on a slipway for repairs.

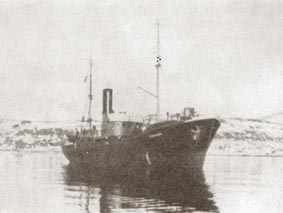
HNoMS Honningsvåg sometime during the Second World War.

==== Evacuation to the UK ====
As the repairs on Honningsvåg were being completed her commander, løytnant Plyhn, was amongst the Norwegian naval officers that received orders on 7 June to sail their vessels to the UK as the Allies had decided to evacuate from Norway in response to the German invasion of France. Initially the orders specified Shetland as the first destination for the Royal Norwegian Navy ships, but after British requests this was changed to Tórshavn on the Faroe Islands where the Norwegian commanders were to contact British naval authorities there to be given recognition signals to identify themselves during their further journey to the UK. The Norwegian Naval Command in Tromsø also ordered the ships to sail as westerly as possible to avoid German air attacks.

Honningsvåg departed Harstad on 7 June 1940 to begin five years in exile, leaving the Norwegian coast at Fugløy and joining the westbound allied convoy on 10 June. On 12 June she and several other Norwegian naval vessels arrived at Tórshavn. As the Royal Norwegian Navy assembled in the UK later in the month its total force was 13 warships and five seaplanes manned by 80 officers and 520 men.

=== Repair work in the UK ===
After arrival in the UK Honningsvåg had a number of repairs carried out and was rearmed with a 4-inch (100 mm) main gun, a 2 pounder pom-pom autocannon, four 12.7 mm Colt Browning AA machine guns, 50 depth charges as well as an Asdic Type 123A sonar system.

=== Iceland Group ===
She was declared war ready on 31 August 1940 and joined the Iceland Group of the RNoN on 6 September 1940 after arriving at Reykjavík. Honningsvåg remained with the Iceland Group for the duration of the war, until 16 May 1945. The Iceland Group, under the overall command of the Admiral Commanding, Iceland Command, initially consisted of Honningsvåg, HNoMS Fridtjof Nansen and HNoMS Nordkapp, later being joined by more Norwegian patrol vessels. The unit's mission was to patrol the Icelandic coastline and the areas of the Arctic Ocean between the islands of Iceland, Jan Mayen and Greenland. Although the Iceland Group had been operational since August 1940 the official establishment of the unit only occurred in June 1941 when a formal RNoN administration was put in place in Reykjavik.

==== Jan Mayen ====
In November 1940 Honningsvåg was sent on a rescue mission to the Norwegian Arctic island of Jan Mayen to retrieve the shipwrecked crew of the Fridtjof Nansen, the latter ship having hit an uncharted underwater reef off the island's southern coast and sunk on 8 November. The crew of the Fridtjof Nansen had managed to abandon ship in lifeboats and land at the nearby Eggøya peninsula on Jan Mayen, from where they were picked up by the Honningsvåg on 12 November and brought back to Iceland. April 1941 saw Honningsvåg return to Jan Mayen in order to re-establish the weather station on the small volcanic island. Honningsvåg and the other vessels of the Iceland Group returned regularly to Jan Mayen with replacement crews and supplies throughout the war. During the visit the crew of Honningsvåg spotted the remnants of two German Heinkel He 115 seaplanes that had been wrecked during a failed October 1940 attempt at establishing a floating seaplane base off the island to provide for meteorological operations.

==== Anti-submarine patrols ====
During patrols and convoy escorting in the Denmark Strait Honningsvåg and fellow Norwegian patrol vessels Namsos, Farsund and Svolvær repeatedly attacked German U-boats. These attacks led to numerous unconfirmed claims of U-boat sinkings. On 10 November 1944 the UK – Reykjavik convoy UR-142 was attacked by U-boats off western Iceland. The British steam tanker Shirvan and the Icelandic merchant vessel Godafoss were both torpedoed and sunk by U-300. In response Honningsvåg and a Royal Navy escort vessel counter-attacked with depth charges, claiming a sinking after hearing a large underwater explosion, seeing oil slicks on the surface, and losing the Asdic contact. Following the attack Honningsvåg picked up 25 survivors from the Shirvan and the Godafoss.

=== Post-Second World War ===
After returning to Norway in the second half of May 1945 Honningsvåg continued in naval service until she was decommissioned and transferred to Naval Command Trøndelag on 23 August 1946. The next year she was sold to a civilian trawler company in Kristiansund and was converted back to her original role as a fishing trawler. In 1973 she was sold for scrapping in Tjeldsund.

== Bibliography ==
- Abelsen, Frank (1986). Norwegian naval ships 1939–1945 (in Norwegian and English). Oslo: Sem & Stenersen AS. ISBN 82-7046-050-8.
- Barr, Susan (2003). Jan Mayen: Norges utpost i vest: øyas historie gjennom 1500 år. Schibsted. ISBN 82-300-0029-8.
- Berg, Ole F. (1997). I skjærgården og på havet - Marinens krig 8. april 1940 – 8. mai 1945 (in Norwegian). Oslo: Marinens krigsveteranforening. ISBN 82-993545-2-8.
- Evans, Mark Llewellyn (1999). Great World War II Battles in the Arctic. Greenwood Publishing Group. ISBN 0-313-30892-6.
- Fjeld, Odd T., ed. (1999). Klar til strid - Kystartilleriet gjennom århundrene (in Norwegian). Oslo: Kystartilleriets Offisersforening. ISBN 82-995208-0-0.
- Hafsten, Bjørn; Ulf Larsstuvold; Bjørn Olsen; Sten Stenersen (1991). Flyalarm - luftkrigen over Norge 1939-1945 (in Norwegian) (1st ed.). Oslo: Sem og Stenersen AS. ISBN 82-7046-058-3.
- Sandberg, Rei (1945). Vi ville slåss (in Norwegian). Oslo: Gyldendal Norsk Forlag.
- Sivertsen, Svein Carl, ed. (2000). Med Kongen til fornyet kamp - Oppbyggingen av Marinen ute under Den andre verdenskrig (in Norwegian). Hundvåg: Sjømilitære Samfund ved Norsk Tidsskrift for Sjøvesen. ISBN 82-994738-8-8.
- Skogheim, Dag; Harry Westrheim (1984). Alarm: krigen i Nordland 1940 (in Norwegian). Oslo: Tiden Norsk Forlag. ISBN 82-10-02582-1.
- Skogheim, Dag (1990). Fiender og mennesker: krig over Sør-Helgeland (in Norwegian). Brønnøyund: Brønnøysund bokhandel. ISBN 82-90963-00-9.
- Steen, E. A. (1958). Norges sjøkrig 1940-45: Sjøforsvarets kamper og virke i Nord-Norge i 1940 (in Norwegian). Vol. 4. Gyldendal Norsk Forlag.
- Thomassen, Marius (1995). 90 år under rent norsk orlogsflagg (in Norwegian). Bergen: Eide Forlag. ISBN 82-514-0483-5.
