= Joris Carolus =

Dutch cartographer and explorer

Joris Carolus (c. 1566–c. 1636) was a Dutch cartographer and explorer who was employed by the Noordsche Compagnie and the Dutch East India Company.

== Early life and background ==
Joris Carolus was born in the Dutch Republic, probably in or near Enkhuizen, in the late 16th century. Little is known about his early life or training, though later records describe him as a skilled pilot, cartographer, and teacher of navigation.

== Career ==
Before becoming an Arctic navigator and cartographer, Carolus served as a soldier during the Eighty Years' War. During the Siege of Ostend (1601–1604) he lost a leg, an injury that appears to have ended his time as a soldier and led him toward navigation and mapmaking.

In 1614 Carolus served as pilot aboard the Enkhuizen vessel den Orangienboom ("Orange Tree"), which was sent north by the Noordsche Compagnie during a Dutch Arctic expedition linked to whaling and exploration. The expedition sailed to Spitsbergen, where he took part in mapping of the Arctic region.

Carolus claimed to have reached 83° N, but this would have been impossible given the ice conditions described by Robert Fotherby, who was also on a voyage of discovery in the ship Thomasine, sent by the rival Muscovy Company of England. According to Fotherby—who saw the Dutch ships riding off Amsterdam Island on July 6/16, "ready for the first opportunity to discover", and on August 9/19 "two ships of the Hollanders, that were appointed for northern discovery, were seene thwart of Faire Haven, sayling to the southwards"— the ice was packed along the northern coast of Spitsbergen. Even in shallops the English were only able to go as far north as Castlins Point (modern Gråhuken, at 79° 48’N).

On the same voyage Carolus came upon the island of Jan Mayen, which may have been discovered earlier the same year by the Dutchman Fopp Gerritsz., sailing in a whaleship sent by the Englishman John Clarke, of Dunkirk. Carolus named it after himself: Mr. Joris eylandt. He also named a bay Gowenaers bay (which name was moved to Gouwenaerbåen) after the master of his ship, and a cape Jan Meys hoeck. This latter name, in honor of Jan Jacobsz. May, master of the other ship sent on discovery, de goude Cath (“The Golden Cat”) of Amsterdam, was later (1620) applied to the island as a whole, giving it the name it retains to this day.

Following his 1614 expedition to Spitsbergen Carolus charted a map of the islands. The map labels various features, including Generaels hoeck (South Cape), Bell sound (Bellsund), Greene harbergh (Grønfjorden), Mari mag. bay (Magdalenefjorden), Hollandsche bay or Feer-haven (Fairhaven), and de Reus ("The Giant", Cloven Cliff), among other things.

The map also shows what may be Edge Island’s south coast. Carolus showed the coastline split into two parts: Onbekende Cust (“Unknown Coast”) in the west, and Morfyn (a corruption of Matsyn, part of Novaya Zemlya) in the east. Islands are shown offshore of Morfyn. Martin Conway argued in 1901 that Carolus’ chart indicated that he had discovered Edge Island; but, as Wielder points out, Conway was ignorant of a map (engraved in 1612) by the Dutch cartographer Petrus Plancius, which illustrated a coastline to the east of Spitsbergen. The coastline, indented, with islands offshore, was labelled Gerrits Eylant. Wielder believed this to the first record of Edge Island's south coast, when in fact this coastline as well was only copied from an earlier chart which merely showed a vague mass that was supposed to represent Spitsbergen.

Edward Heawood, writing in response to Conway's claim of Carolus being the first discoverer of Edge Island, wrote a "Correspondence" refuting his claim. Carolus, who never made any claim of having discovered the said island (which is counter to his usual boastful claims of discovery), shows Morfyn (or Marfyn, which Conway said represented Edge Island) some 18° too far east (relative to the mainland), while Onbekende Cust, which is supposed to represent Kvalpynten (which Heawood questioned as to why Carolus should refer to a land he allegedly discovered as “unknown”?), extends the longitude of the island to 30°, instead of its actual 4° of longitude. Heawood asserts that Carolus may have only copied both coastlines from earlier maps—in particular, Onbekende Cust may correspond to the land (without name) placed between Spitsbergen and Matsyn on a Dutch map of 1611.

The following year, 1615, Carolus was sent by the Noordsche Compagnie on a voyage to the Davis Strait region. Passing through the strait he allegedly reached the impossible latitude of 80° N. The results of this voyage were presented in a (now lost) chart to the States General, and mentioned in a resolution of November 26, 1615. Carolus later (see below) described Baffin Bay in a book he published, saying it extended to 79° N and was enclosed by land.

In 1617, Carolus was again sent on a voyage of discovery by the Delft, Hoorn, and Enkhuizen chambers of the Noordsche Compagnie. He claimed to have discovered two islands: New Holland, between 60° and 63° N, and Opdams island, at 66° N and twenty Dutch miles east of Iceland. Both islands were depicted on a map Carolus supplied to the Noordsche Compagnie, which applied to the States General for a monopoly on whaling rights at the islands (which was granted on October 28, 1617).

"When at length his years and growing feebleness prevented him from voyaging, he settled down at Amsterdam as teacher of navigation, and published a book of charts and sailing directions, now very rare, entitled Het nieuw vermeerde Licht, ghenaemt de Sleutel van’t Tresoor, Spiegel, Gesicht, ende vierighe Colon des Grooten Zeevaerts. Dat is claer ende seeckere beschrijcinghe van de Oost, West, Suydt ende Noordsche Navigatie, verciert met alle noodige perfecte ende duijdelycke Pas-kaarten, Opdoeninghen der Landen, Haven, Kapen ende Rivieren, aenwhsinghe der Drooghten, Landen, Clijpen ende Ondiepten; verscheijdentheijt der plaetsen, 800 deselve in mijlen, graden ende Compas-streecken van den omderen syn ghelegen. Alles van nieuws oversien, verbeetert ende vermeerdert, door Mr. Joris Carolus. Sierman. Leermeester ende Caert-schryver van de groote en cleyne Zeevaert binnen de vermaerde Coopstadt Amsteldam. Ghedruckt tot Amsteldam. By Jan Janssen Boeckvercooper op’t Water in de Paskaert. Anno 1634." This work was copied by many subsequent authors, many of whom claimed it as their own.
