= HMS Naiad (93) =

Light cruiser

Coordinates: 32°1′N 26°20′E

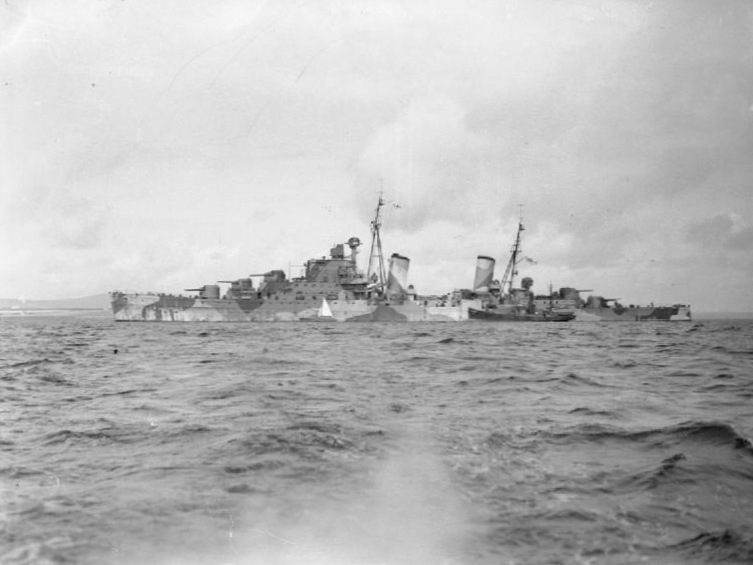
- Naiad at anchor in the Firth of Forth, August 1940

History

United Kingdom
- Name: Naiad
- Namesake: Naiad
- Builder: Hawthorn Leslie and Company Hebburn-on-Tyne
- Laid down: 26 August 1937
- Launched: 3 February 1939
- Commissioned: 24 July 1940
- Identification: Pennant number: 93
- Fate: Sunk, 11 March 1942

General characteristics (as built)
- Class & type: Dido-class light cruiser
- Displacement: 5,600 tons standard; 6,850 tons full load
- Length: 485 ft (148 m) pp; 512 ft (156 m) oa
- Beam: 50.5 ft (15.4 m)
- Draught: 14 ft (4.3 m)
- Installed power: Four Admiralty 3-drum boilers; 62,000 shp (46 MW)
- Propulsion: 4 shafts; 4 geared steam turbines
- Speed: 32.25 knots (59.73 km/h; 37.11 mph)
- Range: 6,824 km (3,685 nmi) at 16 knots (30 km/h; 18 mph)
- Armament: 8 x QF 5.25-inch (133 mm) dual guns; 1 x 4.0 in (102 mm) gun; 2 x 0.5 in MG quadruple guns; 3 x 2-pounder 40 mm pom-poms quad guns; 2 x 21 inch (533 mm) triple torpedo tubes
- Armour: Belt: 3 inch, Deck: 1 inch, Magazines: 2 inch, Bulkheads: 1 inch.

HMS Naiad was a Dido-class light cruiser of the Royal Navy which served in the Second World War. She was sunk in action on 11 March 1942 south of Crete in the Mediterranean Sea.

== History ==
She was built by Hawthorn Leslie and Company (Hebburn-on-Tyne, UK), her keel being laid down on 26 August 1937. She was launched on 3 February 1939, and commissioned 24 July 1940.

She initially joined the Home Fleet and was used for ocean trade protection duties. As part of the 15th Cruiser Squadron she took part in operations against German raiders following the sinking of the armed merchant cruiser Jervis Bay in November 1940. During that month she was involved in the destruction of the German weather ship Hinrich Freese off Jan Mayen. In December and January she escorted convoys to Freetown in Sierra Leone, but at the end of January 1941 was back in northern waters where she briefly sighted the German battleships Scharnhorst and Gneisenau south of Iceland as they were about to break out into the Atlantic (Operation Berlin). By May 1941 Naiad was with Force H in the Mediterranean on Malta convoy operations, and flagship of the 15th Cruiser Squadron. Naiad participated in the Crete operations, where she was badly damaged by German aircraft. She subsequently operated against Vichy French forces in Syria, where, together with the cruiser Leander, she engaged the French destroyer Guépard. For the remainder of her service, she was in the Mediterranean, mostly connected with the continual attempts to resupply Malta.

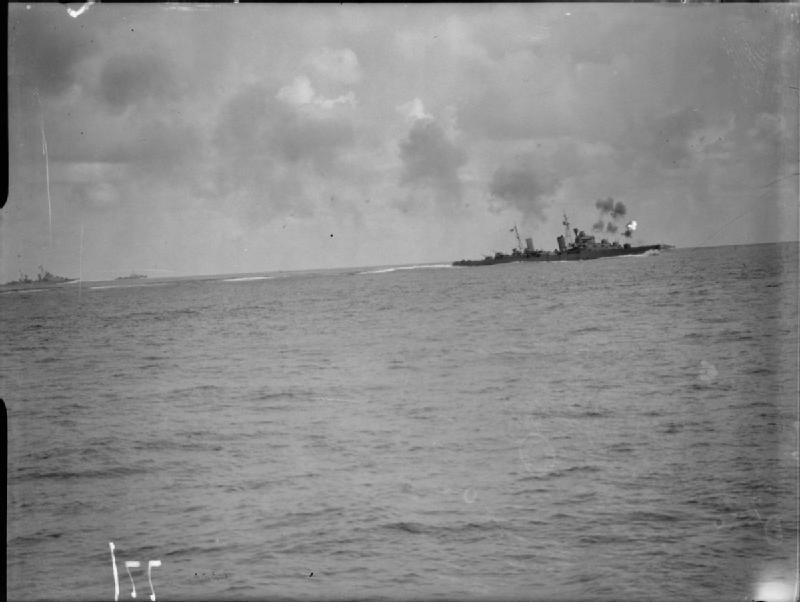
HMS Naiad fires on enemy aircraft with her fore turrets during operations in the Mediterranean, March 1942

In March 1942 she sailed from Alexandria to attack an Italian cruiser that had been reported damaged. This report was false, and on the return, on 11 March 1942, Naiad was sunk by the German submarine U-565 south of Crete. 77 of her ship's company were lost.
