= Båtvika =

Cove on the island of Jan Mayen in Norway

Coordinates: 70.9169°N 8.7209°W

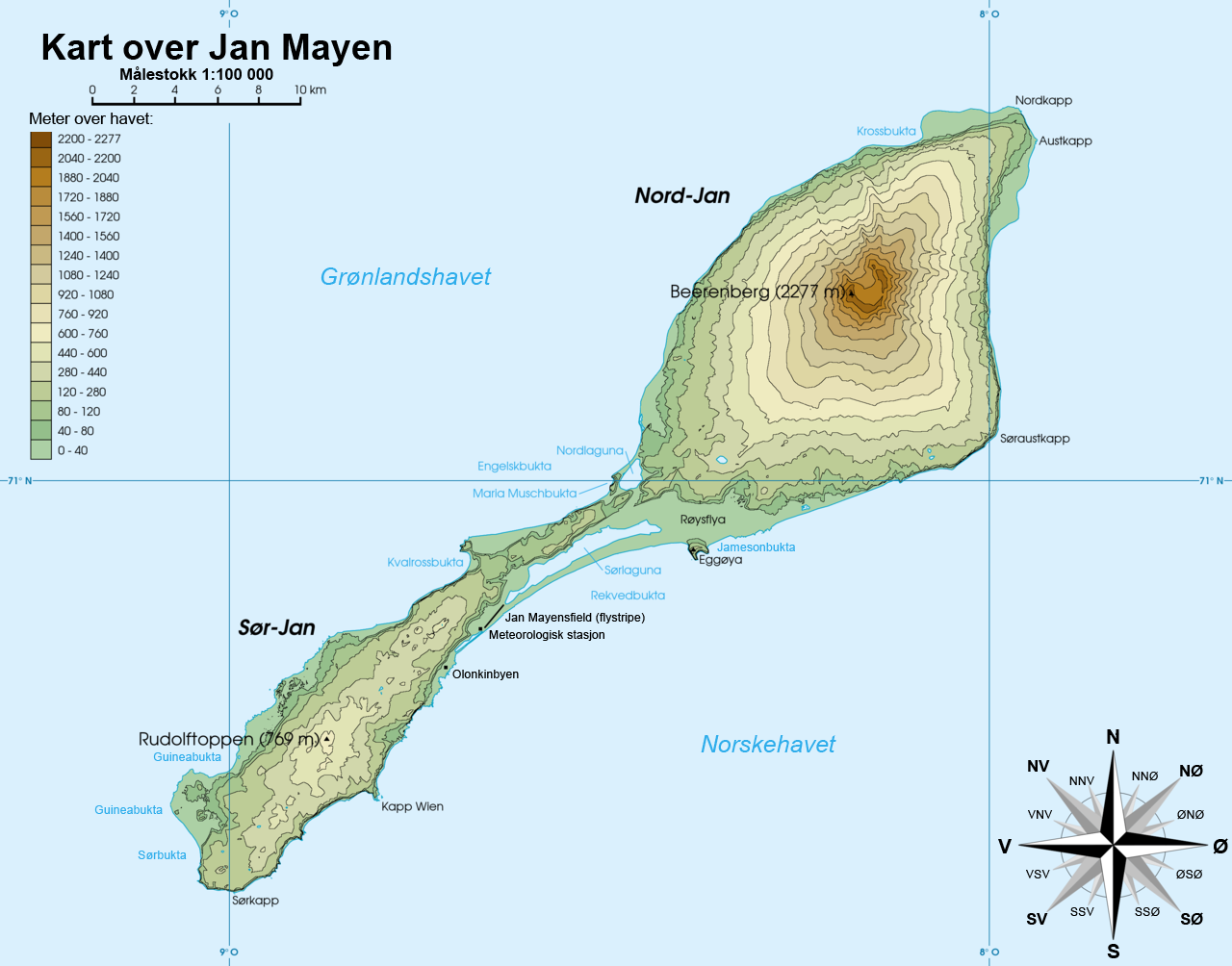
Map of Jan Mayen

Båtvika is a cove at the southern part of the island of Jan Mayen. It is located at the southeastern side of the island, in the southwestern part of Rekvedbukta, northeast of Kapp Traill. The settlement Olonkinbyen is located on the plain northeast of the cove, and Båtvika is the settlement's nearest harbour.
