= Sørkapp (Jan Mayen) =

Southernmost point of Jan Mayen, Norway

Coordinates: 70°49.6′N 8°59.6′W

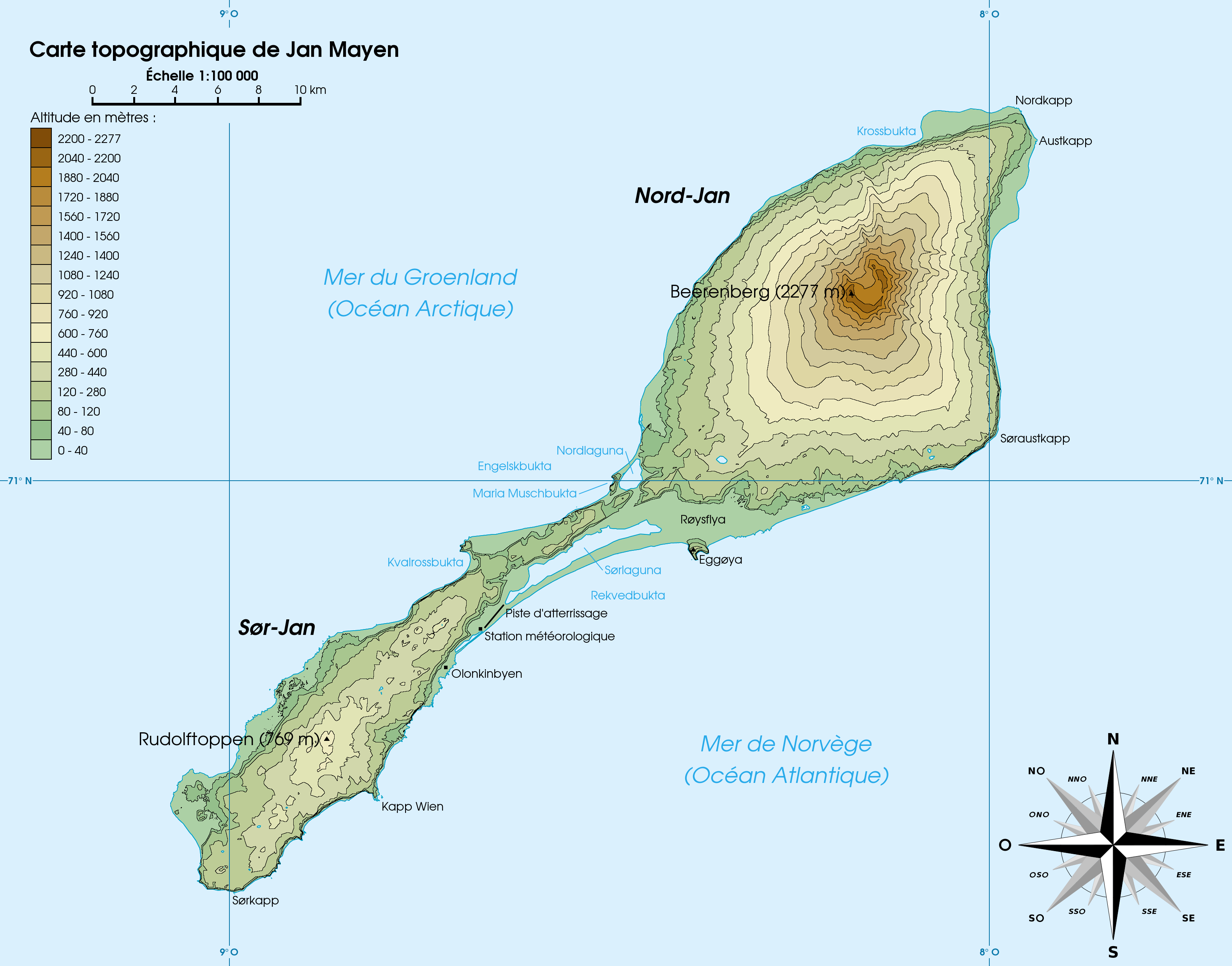
Nordkapp is located on the southwestern tip of Jan Mayen.

Sørkapp (South Cape) is the southernmost point of the island Jan Mayen. The cape is some 455 km east of eastern Greenland, 910 km west northwest of mainland Norway (Lofoten) and 550 km northeast of northeastern Iceland.
