= Sørlaguna =

Lake in Jan Mayen, Norway

Coordinates: 70.975°N 8.525°W

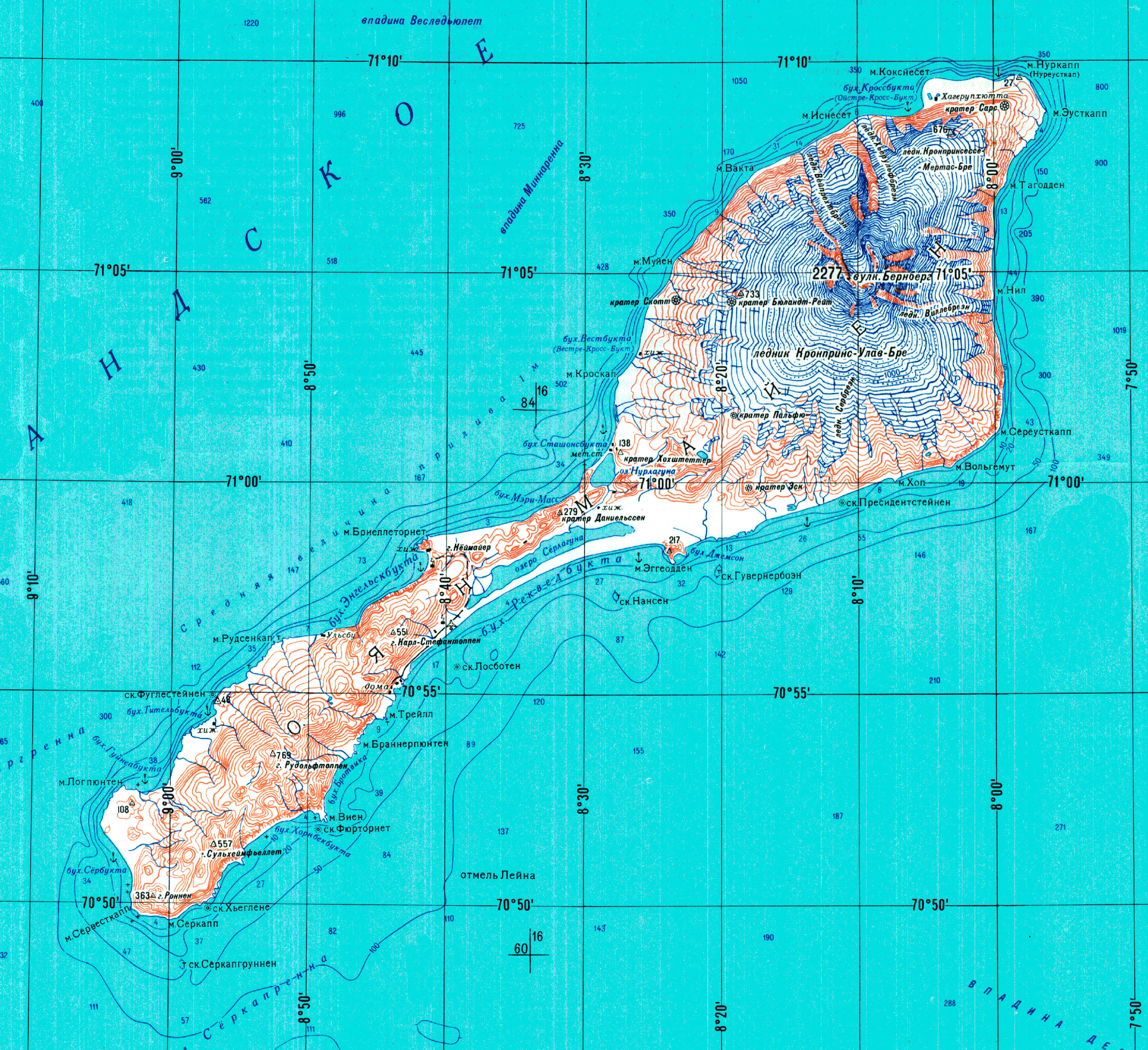
Topographic map of Jan Mayen

Sørlaguna is a lagoon on the island of Jan Mayen. It is the largest lake of Jan Mayen, and is located in the central part of the island, near the bay of Rekvedbukta.

Unlike the second-largest lake on Jan Mayen, Nordlaguna, Sørlaguna is not permanent; its water level is affected by changes in temperature and seasons, and dries out during the Summer. Sørlaguna is separated from the ocean by a natural barrier on the island's beach.
