= HNoMS Fridtjof Nansen (1930) =

Coordinates: 70°57′40″N 8°24′00″W

- Fridtjof Nansen at sea

History

Norway
- Name: Fridtjof Nansen
- Namesake: Norwegian explorer Fridtjof Nansen
- Builder: Royal Norwegian Naval Yard at Karljohansvern, Horten
- Yard number: 118
- Launched: 5 November 1930
- Commissioned: 29 May 1931
- Decommissioned: 8 November 1940
- Fate: Ran aground on an unmarked shallow and sank outside Jan Mayen on 8 November 1940

Service record
- Commanders: Ole A. Blom (1931-?); Odd Isaachsen Willoch (?-?)
- Operations: Norwegian Campaign; Battle of the Atlantic

General characteristics
- Displacement: 1,275 tons
- Length: 72.8 m (238.85 ft)
- Beam: 10.5 m (34.45 ft)
- Draft: 5.7 m (18.70 ft)
- Propulsion: 2000 hp Lenz steam engine, 2 shafts
- Speed: 15 knots (27.78 km/h)
- Range: 7,000 nautical miles (12,964.00 km)
- Complement: 70 men
- Armament: 2 × 10 cm (4 inch) guns; 2 × 47 mm (1.85 inch); automatic guns

Fridtjof Nansen was the first ship in the Norwegian armed forces to be built specially to perform coast guard and fishery protection duties in the Arctic. She saw service in the Second World War with the Royal Norwegian Navy until she ran aground on an unmarked shallow at Jan Mayen in November 1940.

== Construction ==
Fridtjof Nansen was constructed with yard number 118 at the Royal Norwegian Naval Yard at Karljohansvern in Horten. She was launched on 5 November 1930, and command was assumed on 29 May 1931 by Commander Ole A. Blom.

== 1933 sinking ==
On 21 December 1933 Fridtjof Nansen departed the port of Hammerfest on her way to her patrol areas in eastern Finnmark. While passing through Vestervågen in Måsøy Municipality, she ran aground and sank the next night. She was raised the next year and taken to Horten for repairs.

== War service ==
=== Norwegian Campaign ===
At the outbreak of war in Norway with the German invasion on 9 April 1940, Fridtjof Nansen was posted to the Finnmark detachment of the 3rd Naval District covering North Norway. When the German invasion began Fridtjof Nansen was operating from the port of Honningsvåg in Finnmark.

=== Escape abroad ===
After surviving several air attacks without damage during the Norwegian Campaign Fridtjof Nansen was one of the thirteen Royal Norwegian Navy vessels that made it to the United Kingdom, as she escaped westwards at the dawn of the 10 June 1940 mainland Norwegian capitulation. On 8 June 1940 she took on board in Tromsø Rear Admiral Henry E. Diesen, foreign minister Halvdan Koht and General Carl Gustav Fleischer, in addition to some other refugees. Among those who escaped on Fridtjof Nansen were some 20-25 anti-Nazi German refugees. One of the Germans fleeing with his family on Fridtjof Nansen, was Dadaist painter Kurt Schwitters.

She arrived at Tórshavn on the Faroe Islands on 13 June and sailed on at 0600 on 16 June to Rosyth in Scotland in the company of six other Norwegian warships. The Norwegian vessels were escorted from Tórshavn by the British destroyer HMS Veteran, the destroyer HMS Kelvin and two trawlers joining the convoy later during the journey. After her arrival at Rosyth on 18 June work began on making Fridtjof Nansen war ready.

=== In exile ===
From 29 August 1940 she was posted as a patrol vessel in Iceland to reinforce the British naval forces there. On 8 November she ran aground on an unmarked shallow off the south coast of the Norwegian Arctic island of Jan Mayen and sank. The crew of 67 all survived the shipwreck. After the loss of their ship, the crew reached land at the Eggøya peninsula, and took shelter in the abandoned Norwegian radio station on Jan Mayen. The shipwrecked crew made preparations to send a boat to Iceland to retrieve help. Help arrived before the boat could leave, when the naval trawler HNoMS Honningsvåg came from Iceland four days later, responding to the emergency messages the crew had sent before Fridtjof Nansen had to be abandoned. The crew was brought back to Iceland.

== Bibliography ==
- Abelsen, Frank (1986). Norwegian naval ships 1939–1945 (in Norwegian and English). Oslo: Sem & Stenersen AS. ISBN 82-7046-050-8.
- Barr, Susan (2003). Jan Mayen: Norges utpost i vest: øyas historie gjennom 1500 år (in Norwegian). Oslo: Schibsted. ISBN 82-300-0029-8.
- Fjørtoft, Kjell (1991). På feil side – Den andre krigen (in Norwegian). Oslo: Gyldendal Norsk Forlag. ISBN 82-05-20231-1.
- Hovland, Torkel (2000). General Carl Gustav Fleischer: Storhet og fall (in Norwegian) (3rd ed.). Oslo: Aschehoug.
- Sivertsen, Svein Carl, ed. (2001). Sjøforsvaret dag for dag 1814–2000 (in Norwegian). Hundvåg: Sjømilitære Samfund ved Norsk Tidsskrift for Sjøvesen. ISBN 82-92217-03-7.
- Thomassen, Marius (1995). 90 år under rent norsk orlogsflagg (in Norwegian). Bergen: Eide Forlag. ISBN 82-514-0483-5.
