= Nordlaguna =

Lake in Jan Mayen, Norway

Coordinates: 71.00°N 8.47°W

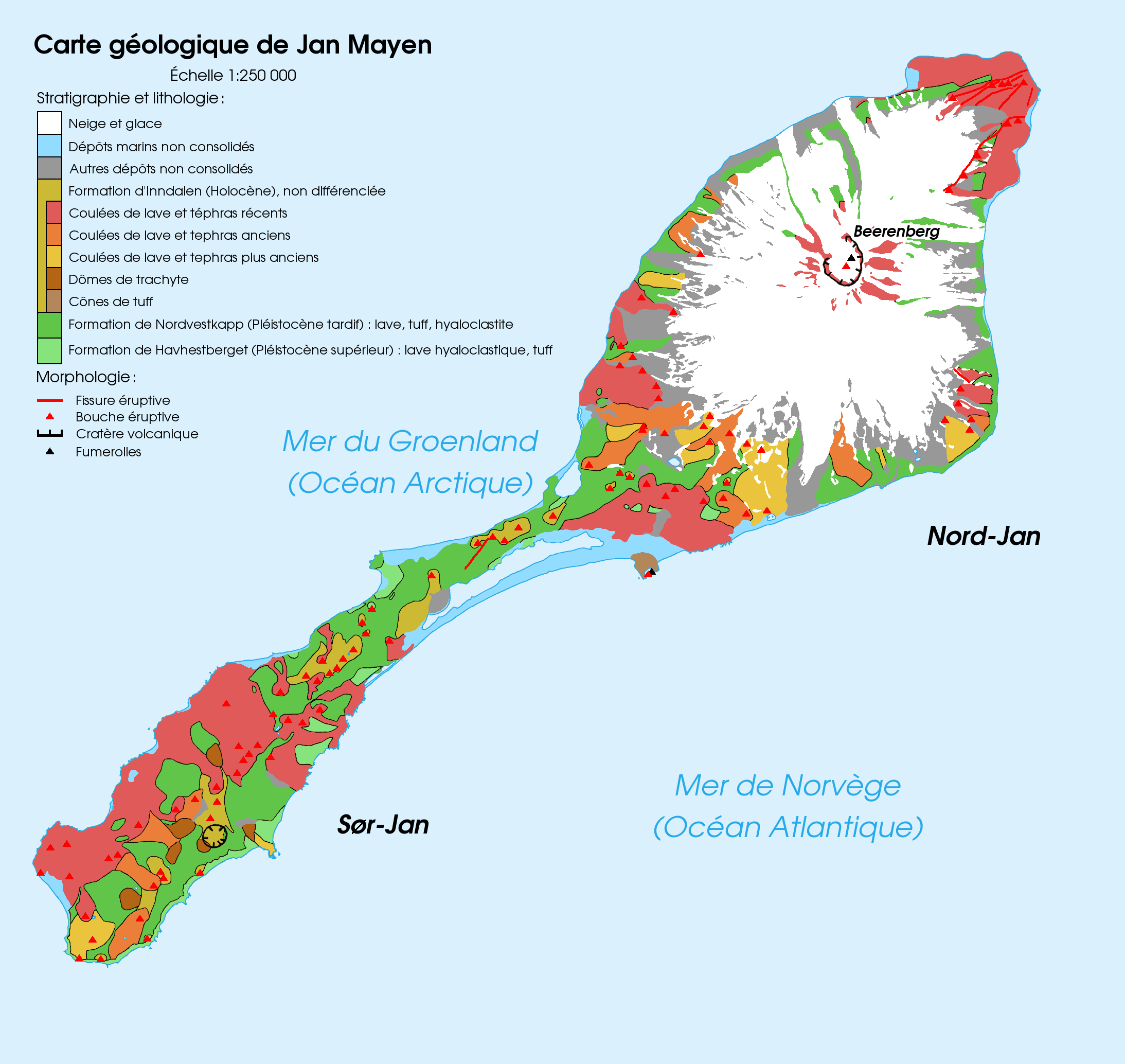
Map of Jan Mayen

Nordlaguna is a lagoon on the island of Jan Mayen. It is the second largest lake of Jan Mayen, after Sørlaguna, and is located in the central part of the island, near the bay of Stasjonsbukta. It was possibly formed by an eruption of Beerenberg volcano in 1732. Before isolation from the ocean 220 calyr BP what is now the Nordlaguna basin was a marine bay for about 2200 years. Before this, in a timespan between 2200 and 2400 calyr BP, it was mostly isolated from the ocean. This lake or lake-like period was preceded by at least 300–400 years of marine conditions.

Most of the lake is deeper than 25m below sea level; Its deepest part lies in the southeast, reaching 36m.

Nordlaguna is the source of many sediments, which come from various locations. During Winter, for example, the surface of the lake can be covered in gravel due to wind. Run-off from nearby valleys also contributes to the sediment content. Macrofossils are present within the sediments. Common resources also present include sand, clay, and gravel.

Around the lake, slopes have been steepened by erosion. These slopes consist of colluvium, which is dense, and often loose, sand and sediment. The rocks around the lake have been dated from 20-260 ka, and consist of tuff.

The lake hosts an isolated population of Arctic char, which suggests that, at one point, it had been connected to the sea. Species of diatom and plankton have also been discovered, as well as water fleas, ostracods, and the larvae of crustaceans.
