= Jamesonbukta =

Bay on the Norwegian island of Jan Mayen

Coordinates: 70.975°N 8.354°W

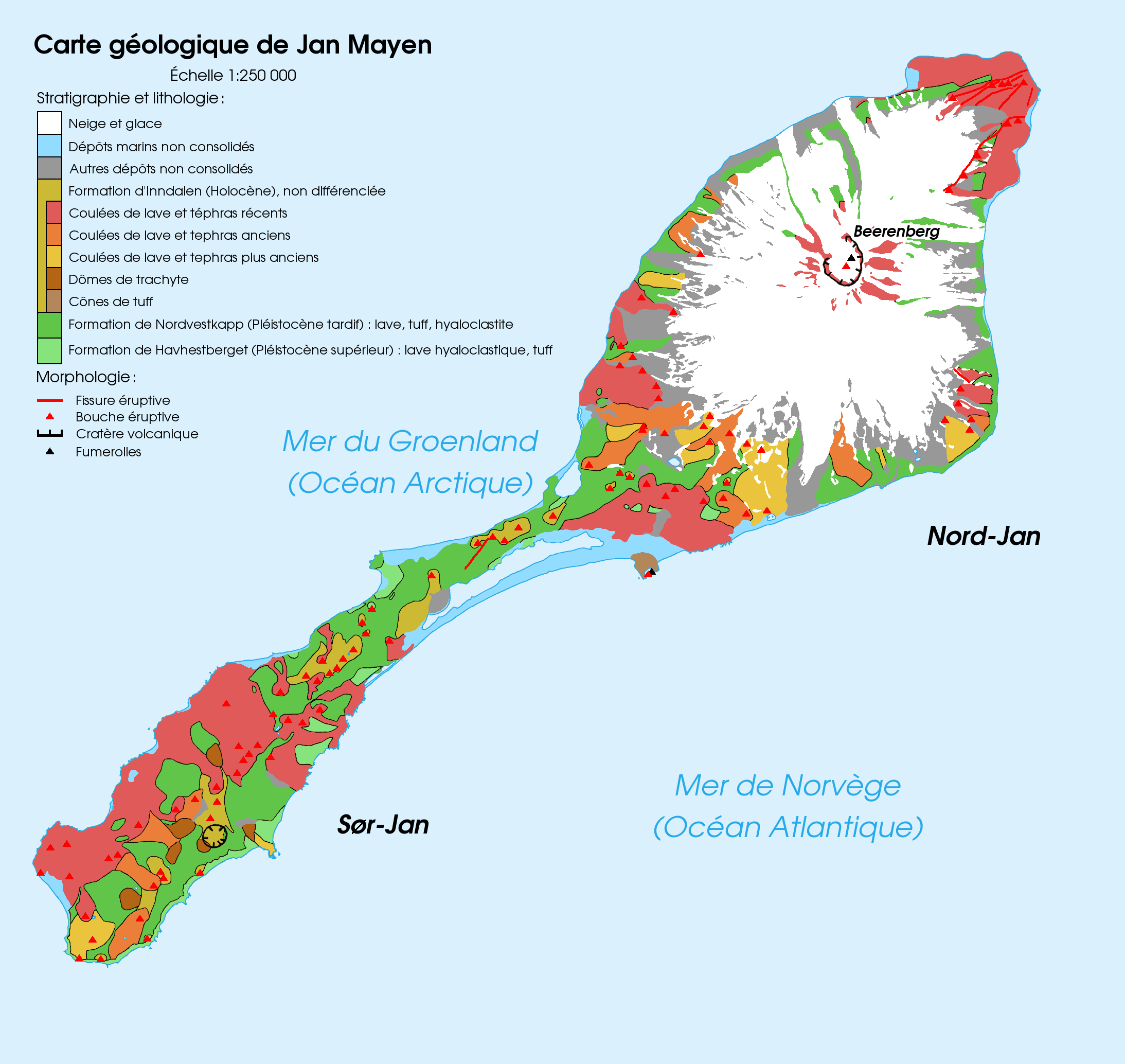
Map of Jan Mayen

Jamesonbukta is a bay in the island of Jan Mayen. It is located east of Eggøya, on the southern side and central part of Jan Mayen.
