= Eggøybukta =

Bay in Jan Mayen, Norway

Coordinates: 70.974°N 8.398°W

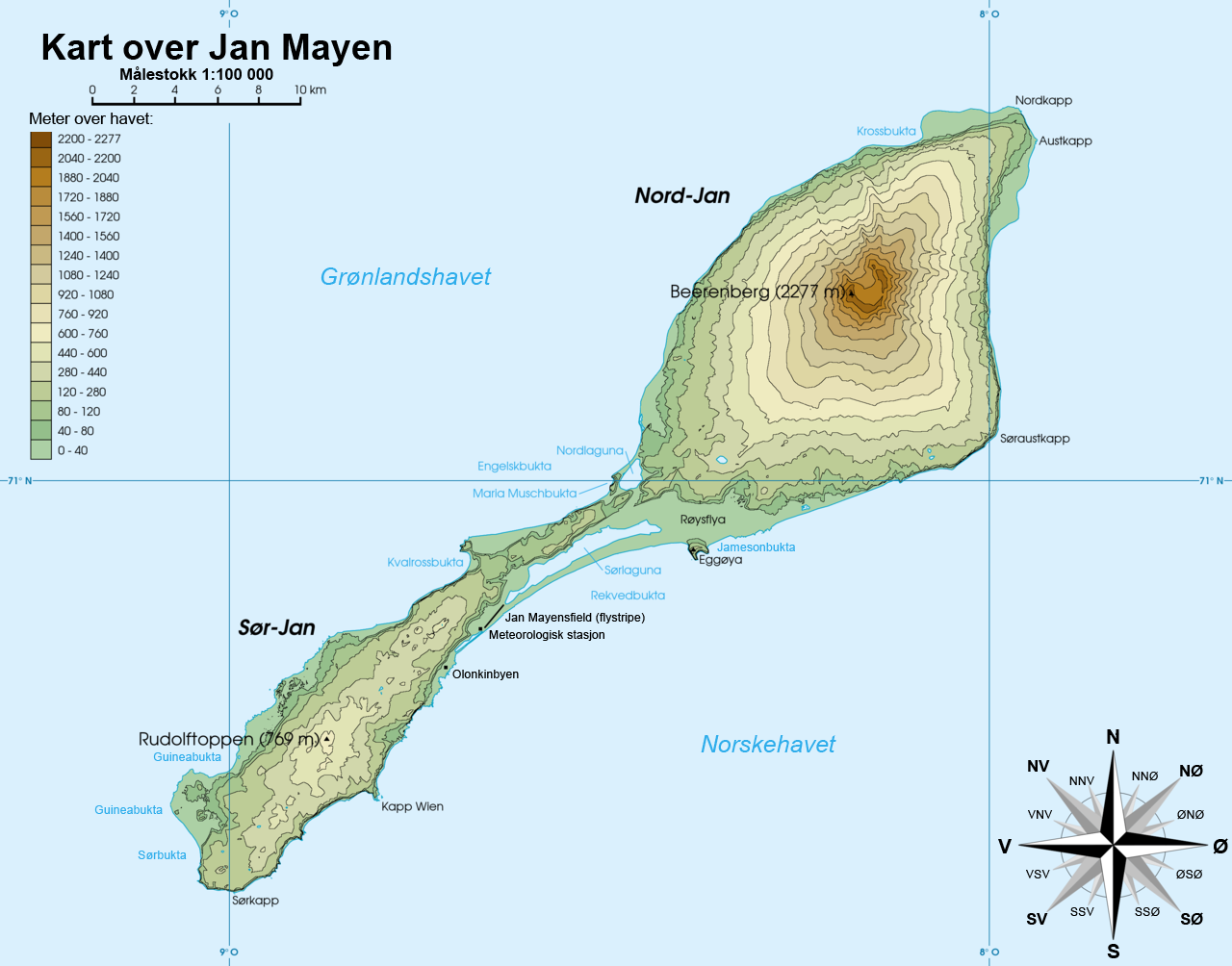
Map of Jan Mayen

Eggøybukta is a bay located on the island of Jan Mayen. It is located west of Eggøya, on the southern side and central part of Jan Mayen.
