= Anders K. Orvin =

Norwegian geologist and explorer

Anders Kristian Orvin (24 October 1889 – 2 October 1980) was a Norwegian geologist and explorer.

== Biography ==
He was born in Hattfjelldal Municipality in Nordland, Norway. He was a son of Ole Tobias Olsen (1830–1924) and Christine Bernhardine Dahl (1855–1910). His father was a parish pastor in Nordland.

Orvin finished his secondary education in 1909 and graduated cand.min. from the Royal Frederick University (now University of Oslo) in mineralogy in 1912. He mostly explored and worked at Spitsbergen, but had tenures in Siberia in 1914. As well as Spitsbergen his expeditions went to East Greenland and Bear Island. He served as operating manager of the molybdenite mines Ornehommen Molybdengruber 1915 to 1916 and at Dalen Gruber in Telemark county from 1918 to 1921. He was hired in the Norwegian Polar Institute in 1928. He was acting managing director from 1945 to 1948. He served as sub-director until being managing director from 1958 to 1961.

He took his dr.philos. degree in 1934 on the thesis Geology of the Kings Bay Region, Spitsbergen. Among his other writings are Geology of Bear Island (1928, with Gunnar Horn) and Outline of the Geological History of Spitsbergen (1940). After the war he wrote The place-names of Jan Mayen (1960).

He was a fellow of the Norwegian Academy of Science and Letters from 1952, was made a Knight, First Class of Order of St. Olav in 1960 and a Knight of the Order of the Polar Star. He died during 1980 and was buried in the cemetery at Vestre Aker Church in Oslo.

The Orvin Mountains in Queen Maud Land in Antarctica and Orvin Land in Svalbard are named after him.
