= Titeltbukta =

Bay of Jan Mayen

Coordinates: 70°54.5′N 8°56.7′W

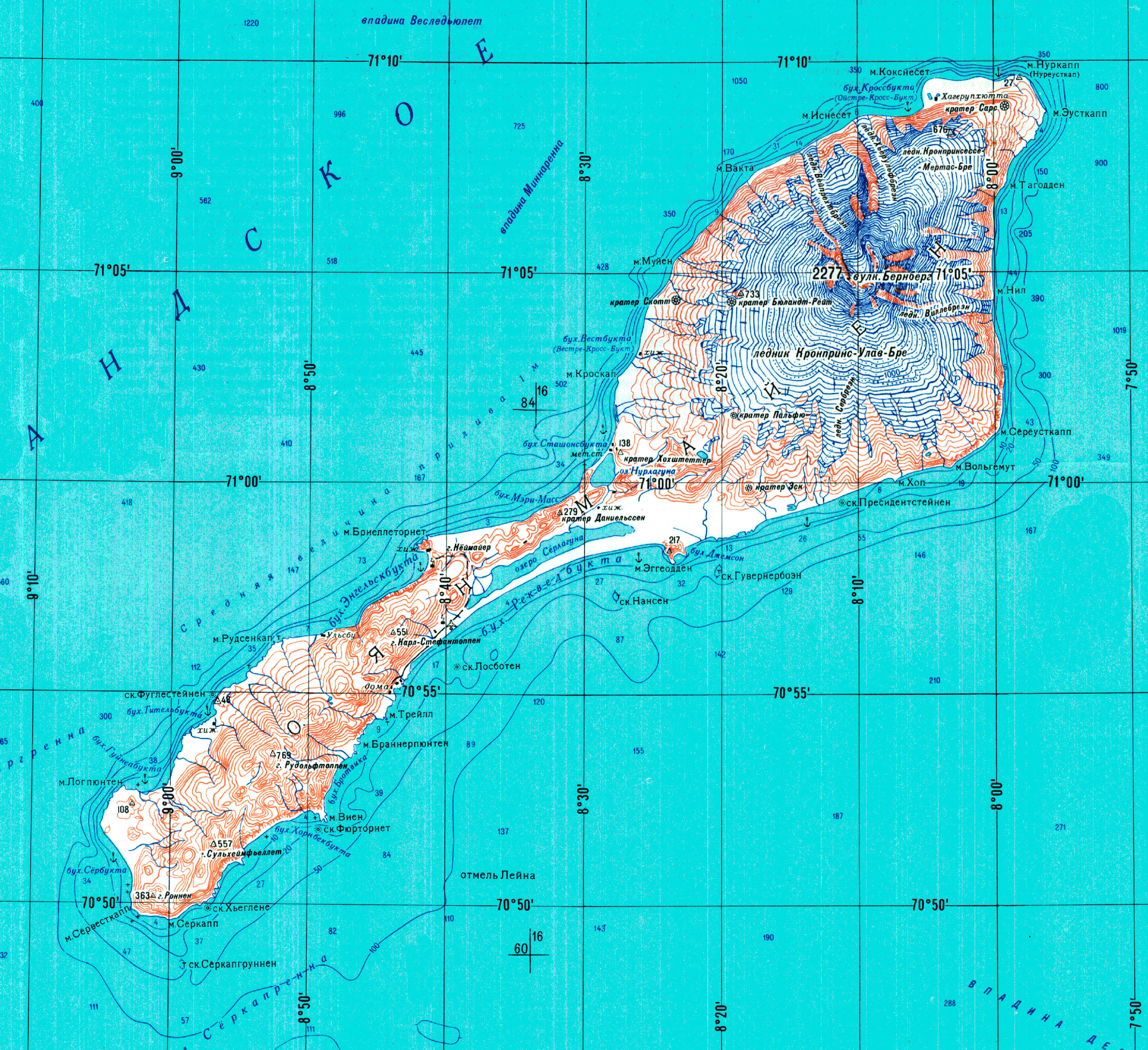
Topographic map of Jan Mayen

Titeltbukta (English: Ten Tents Bay) is a bay on the northwestern coast of the Norwegian island of Jan Mayen. The name originates from the establishment of ten "tents", in reality wood and brick structures, as a basic whaling station. This was set up in 1624 by Dutch whalers to lodge the men who flensed (cut up) the whales. The Dutch also called it Zuidbaai (South Bay), in contrast to the other on the island, to the north at Engelskbukta).
