= Gennady Olonkin =

Russian-Norwegian polar explorer and telegraphist

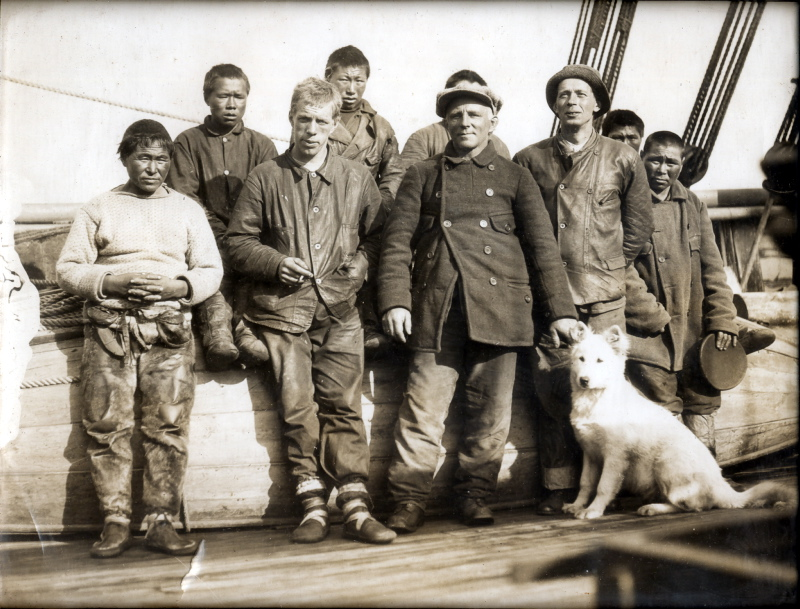
Gennadij Olonkin, third from left

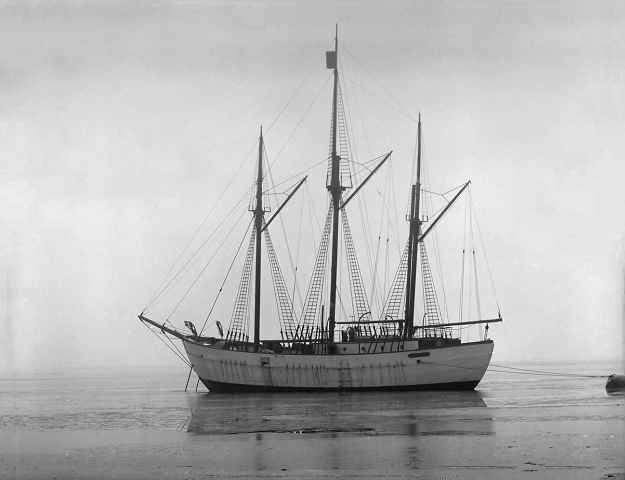
Maud in (1918)

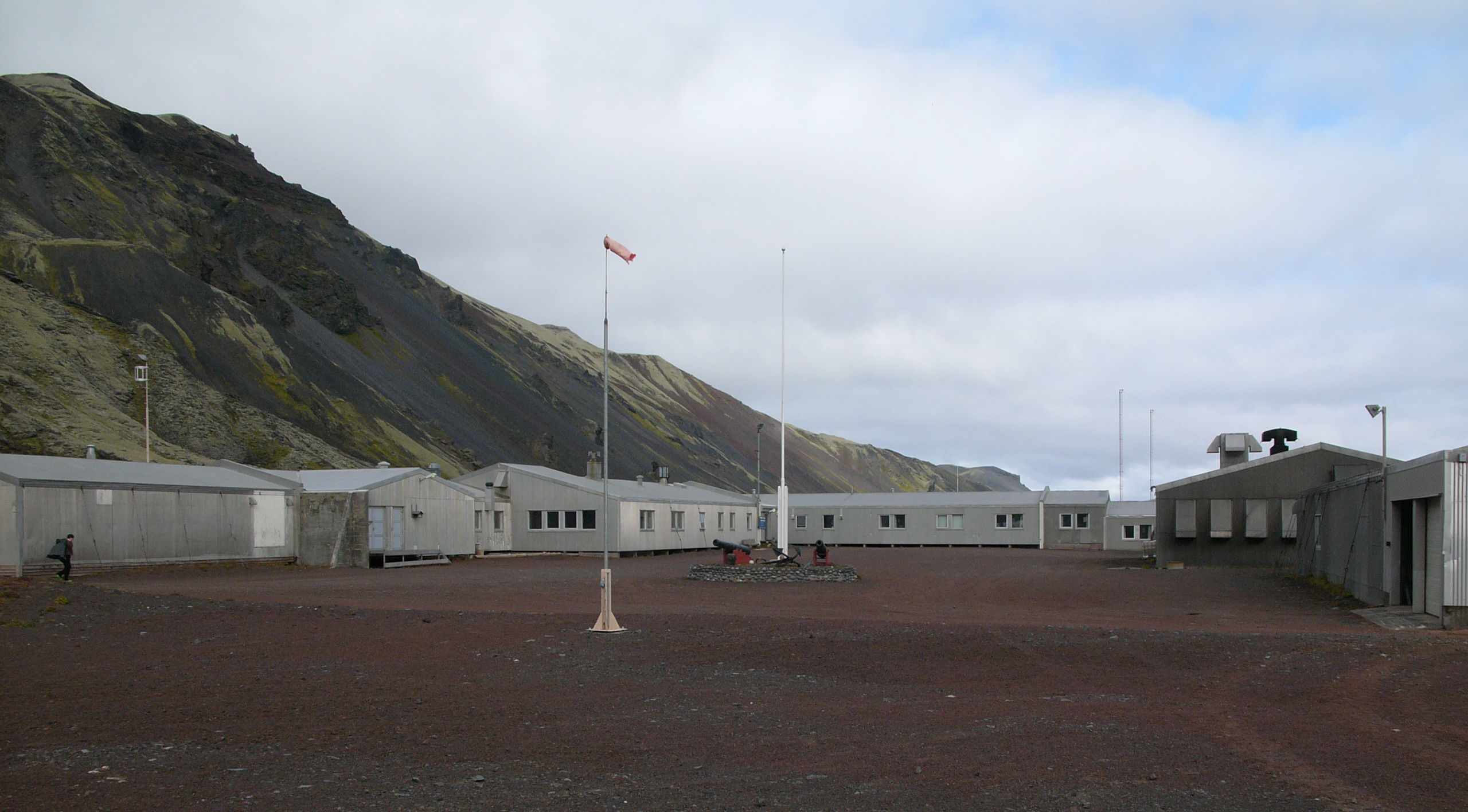
Olonkinbyen on Jan Mayen in August

Gennady Nikitich Olonkin (Russian: Геннадий Никитич Олонкин, Norwegian: Gennadij Nikititsj Olonkin) (September 10, 1898 – September 15, 1960) was a Russian-Norwegian polar explorer, telegraphist and radio operator.

== Biography ==
Gennady Nikitich Olonkin was born in the Arkhangelsk Governorate of the Russian Empire. His parents were Nikita V. Olonkin from Russia and Jelena Olonkina (born Eli Haanshus) from Vardø in Norway. He was the only son among twelve children.

From 1918 to 1925, he was a telegraph and radio operator as well as mechanic on the polar ship Maud, led by Roald Amundsen. In 1926, Olonkin took part in the first part of the Amundsen-Ellsworth 1926 Transpolar Flight with the airship Norge from Rome to Svalbard providing radio contact with the different ground control stations.

In 1926 he was honored as a Knight of the Order of St. Olav. Olonkin acquired Norwegian citizenship and worked at the Norwegian Meteorological Institute. He served on Jan Mayen in the years 1928–1929, 1930–1931, 1933–1934, and 1935–1936. From 1958 he worked in conjunction with an expansion of a LORAN station (NATO) on Jan Mayen.

Gennadij Olonkin was married and had one son and two daughters. He died in Tromsø, Norway, in 1960. Both Cape Olonkin and Olonkinbyen on the island of Jan Mayen have been named in his honor.
