= Olonkinbyen =

Settlement in Jan Mayen

- Locale (de facto capital of Jan Mayen)
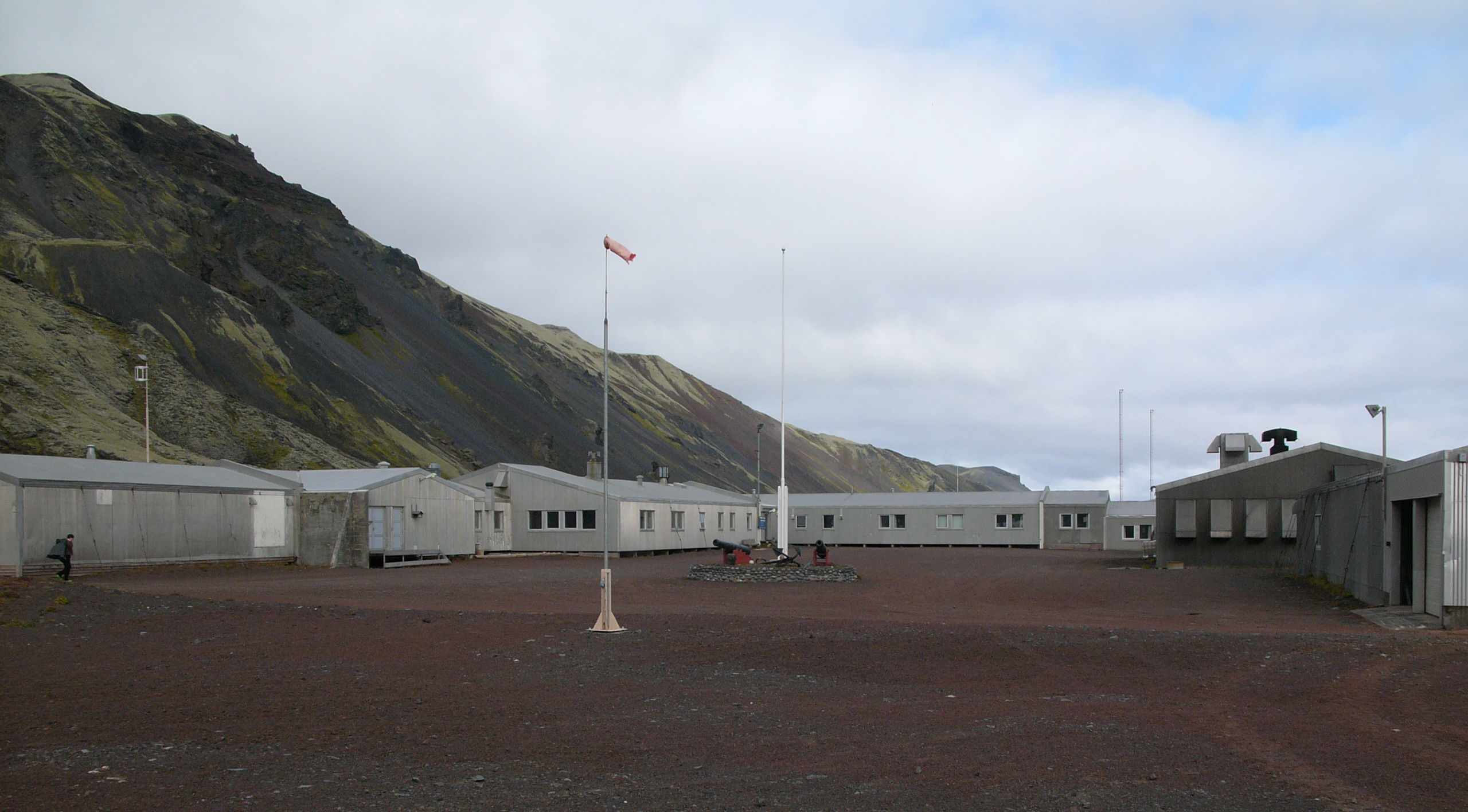
- Olonkinbyen on Jan Mayen island
- Etymology: Olonkin City
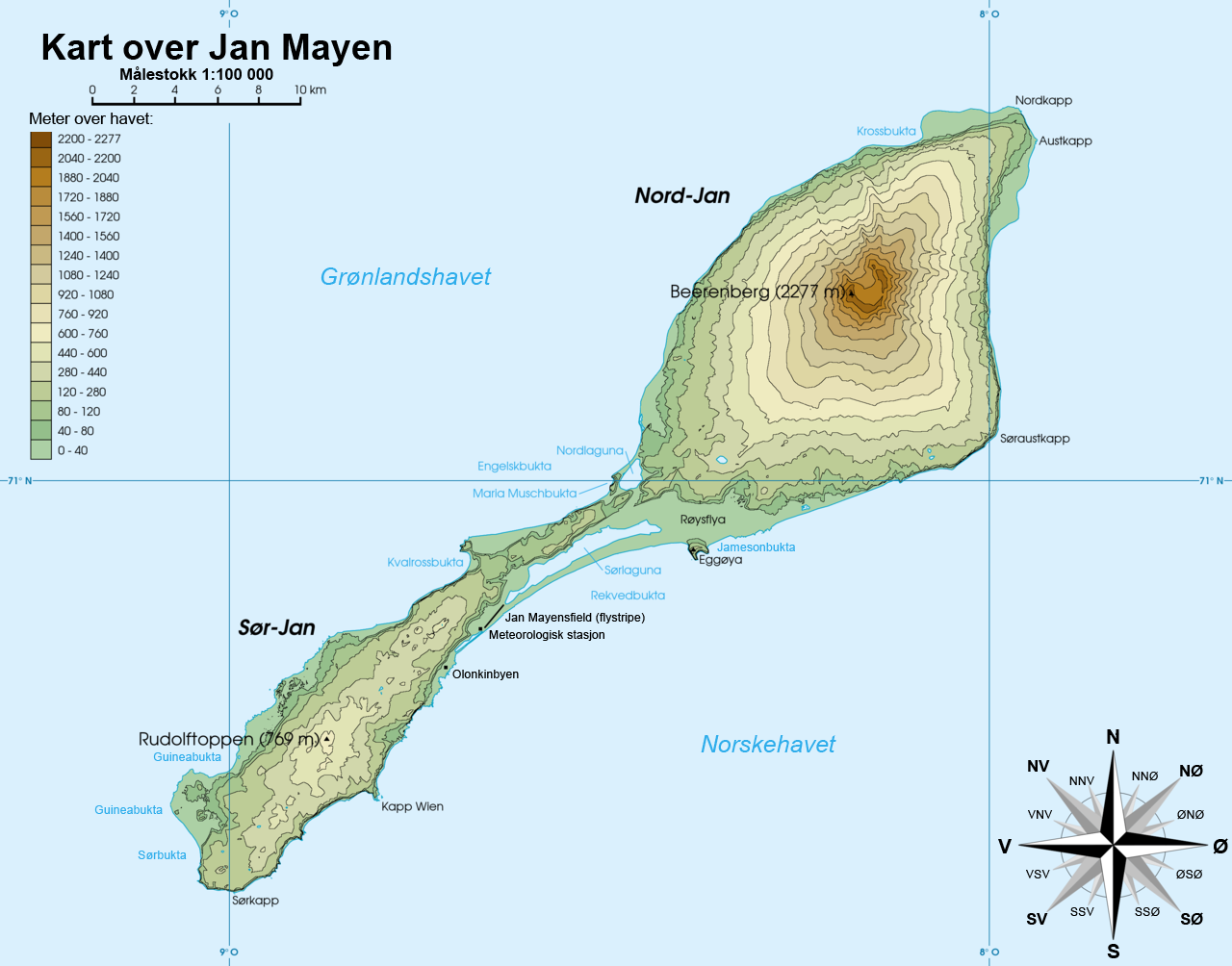
- Map of Jan Mayen

- Location of Olonkinbyen in Europe
- Coordinates: 70°55′19″N 8°42′54″W
- Country: Norway
- ISO: Svalbard and Jan Mayen
- Island: Jan Mayen
- Established: 1962

Area
  - Total: 0.3 km^{2} (0.12 sq mi)
- Elevation: 9 m (30 ft)

Population
  - Total: c. 18
- Time zone: UTC+01:00 (CET)
  - Summer (DST): UTC+02:00 (CEST)
- Website: jan.mayen.no

Olonkinbyen (Norwegian pronunciation: [ˈuːlɔŋkɪnˌbyːən], lit. The Olonkin Town) is the only settlement on the Norwegian island of Jan Mayen (aside from isolated cottage huts such as Puppebu). It was named after Russian-Norwegian explorer Gennady Olonkin, who participated in Arctic expeditions and served on Jan Mayen during several periods between 1928 and 1936.

The only inhabitants on the island are the 18 personnel, 14 working for the Norwegian Armed Forces and 4 for the Norwegian Meteorological Institute, though the population can temporarily increase to as many as 35. Olonkinbyen houses the staff that operate the meteorological observation station, Loran-C station, Jan Mayensfield air field and other infrastructure. The meteorological observation service staff are responsible for the radiosonde releases and synoptic weather observations. The crew of the meteorological station is engaged for six months at a time. Personnel rotation typically occurs twice per year, in April and October, and there are no permanent residents. However, the station chief — a military officer — generally stays for a full year.

Supplies are delivered eight times a year by aircraft, landing at Jan Mayensfield, located about 5 kilometres (3.1 mi) northeast of Olonkinbyen. Fuel and heavy goods are transported by boat during the summer. The settlement generates its own electrical power via three generators.

The settlement is located on the eastern coast of the southern part of Jan Mayen, in the area known as Trollsletta. It lies approximately 20 kilometres (12 mi) northeast of Hoybergodden, 25 kilometres (16 mi) northeast of Sørkapp (the southern tip of the island), and 5 kilometres (3.1 mi) northeast of Rudolftoppen, the highest peak in southern Jan Mayen.

The station was built in 1961 and officially opened in 1962, originally in connection with the construction of the Jan Mayen Loran-C transmitter. The LORAN-C antenna was in operation until 2015 and was dismantled in 2017.

In addition to its military and meteorological functions, the island hosts scientific instrumentation, including a seismograph operated by the University of Bergen, a magnetometer operated by the University of Tromsø, and a satellite-controlled radio station remotely managed from Bodø since 1995. The weather station, located approximately 3 km north of Olonkinbyen, performs radiosonde launches twice daily and issues synoptic observations six times per day.

== Climate ==
Olonkinbyen has a tundra climate (Köppen classified as ET). The warmest month in Olonkinbyen is August and the coldest month is March.

Climate data for Olonkinbyen
Month	Jan	Feb	Mar	Apr	May	Jun	Jul	Aug	Sep	Oct	Nov	Dec	Year
Mean daily maximum °C (°F)	−5 (23)	−5 (23)	−5 (23)	−3 (27)	0 (32)	3 (37)	5 (41)	5 (41)	3 (37)	1 (34)	−2 (28)	−4 (25)	−1 (31)
Mean daily minimum °C (°F)	−10 (14)	−11 (12)	−11 (12)	−9 (16)	−5 (23)	−2 (28)	0 (32)	1 (34)	−1 (30)	−4 (25)	−7 (19)	−9 (16)	−6 (22)
Average precipitation cm (inches)	7.6 (3)	5.1 (2)	7.6 (3)	5.1 (2)	5.1 (2)	5.1 (2)	5.1 (2)	7.6 (3)	7.6 (3)	10 (4)	7.6 (3)	7.6 (3)	81.1 (32)

Data from the last official WMO period, provided by Norwegian Meteorological institute, which operates the only weather station on Jan Mayen, located in Olonkinbyen.

Climate data for Olonkinbyen, Jan Mayen 1991–2020 (10 m, extremes 1921–2023)
Month	Jan	Feb	Mar	Apr	May	Jun	Jul	Aug	Sep	Oct	Nov	Dec	Year
Record high °C (°F)	9.5 (49.1)	10 (50)	8.3 (46.9)	10.3 (50.5)	14.4 (57.9)	18.1 (64.6)	18 (64)	17 (63)	14.2 (57.6)	15 (59)	10 (50)	12.3 (54.1)	18.1 (64.6)
Mean daily maximum °C (°F)	−0.7 (30.7)	−1.2 (29.8)	−1.6 (29.1)	−0.2 (31.6)	2.1 (35.8)	5.1 (41.2)	7.5 (45.5)	7.9 (46.2)	6 (43)	3 (37)	0.9 (33.6)	−0.4 (31.3)	2.4 (36.2)
Daily mean °C (°F)	−2.9 (26.8)	−3.4 (25.9)	−3.7 (25.3)	−2.1 (28.2)	0.4 (32.7)	3.1 (37.6)	5.7 (42.3)	6.3 (43.3)	4.5 (40.1)	1.3 (34.3)	−1 (30)	−2.5 (27.5)	0.5 (32.8)
Mean daily minimum °C (°F)	−5.2 (22.6)	−5.5 (22.1)	−5.8 (21.6)	−3.9 (25.0)	−1 (30)	1.6 (34.9)	4.3 (39.7)	5.1 (41.2)	3.2 (37.8)	−0.3 (31.5)	−2.9 (26.8)	−4.6 (23.7)	−1.2 (29.7)
Record low °C (°F)	−26.9 (−16.4)	−28.4 (−19.1)	−26.8 (−16.2)	−21.4 (−6.5)	−12 (10)	−5.1 (22.8)	−3.2 (26.2)	−2.3 (27.9)	−5.2 (22.6)	−18 (0)	−19.5 (−3.1)	−24.2 (−11.6)	−28.4 (−19.1)
Average precipitation mm (inches)	61 (2.4)	52 (2.0)	53 (2.1)	39 (1.5)	35 (1.4)	23 (0.9)	36 (1.4)	57 (2.2)	78 (3.1)	72 (2.8)	69 (2.7)	68 (2.7)	643 (25.2)
Source 1: Norwegian Meteorological Institute
Source 2: Meteostat
