= Hoepstockbukta =

Cove on the Norwegian island of Jan Mayen

Coordinates: 70°55.8′N 8°53.3′W

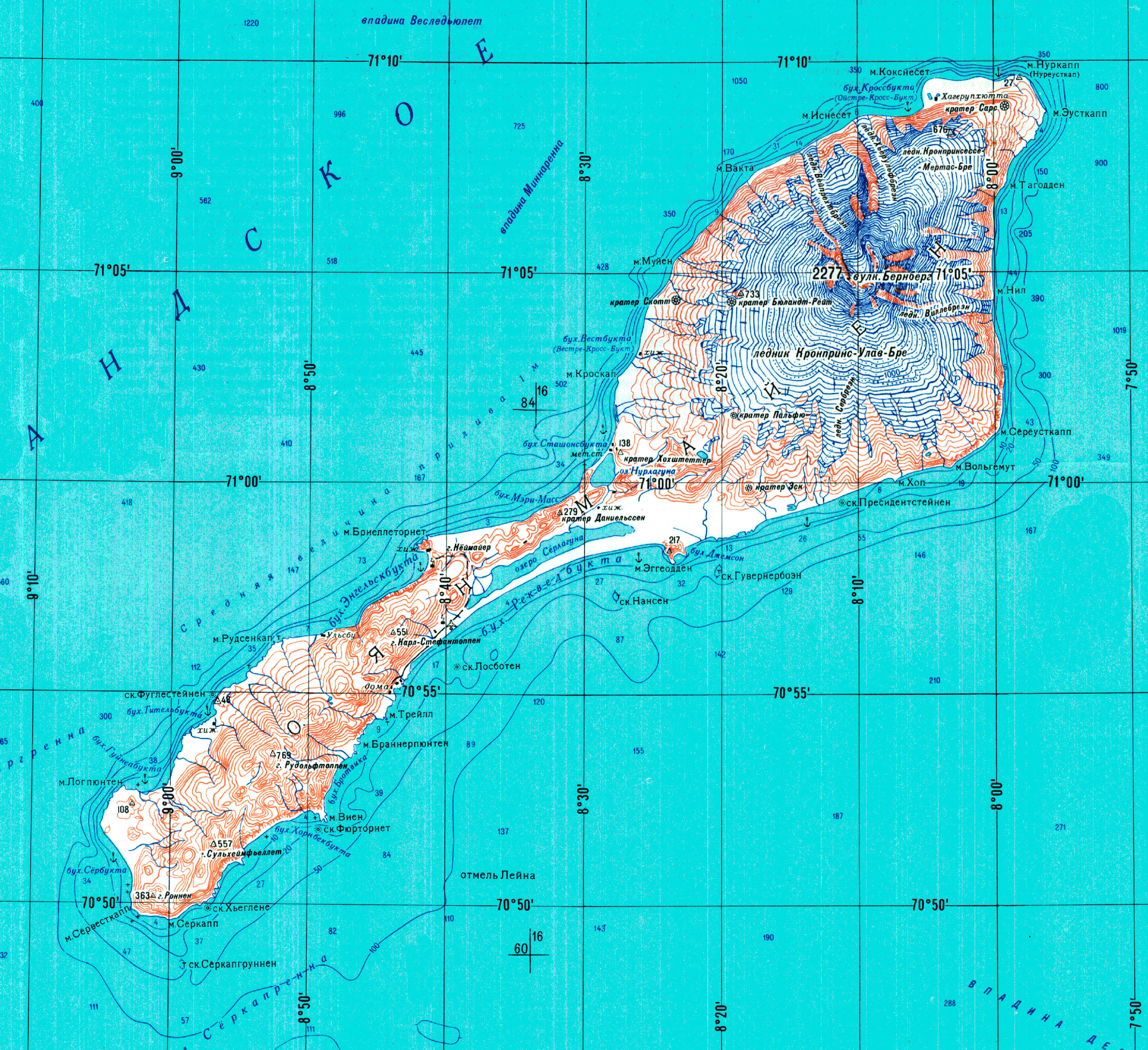
Topographic map of Jan Mayen

Hoepstockbukta (English: Hoepstock Bay) is a small cove on the western coast of the Norwegian island of Jan Mayen and is named after Mathijs Jansz. Hoepstock, a Rotterdam whaler, who was the first to use the bay in 1616. The cove is shown on Joan Blaeu's 1662 map of the island.
