= Engelskbukta (Jan Mayen) =

Bay on Jan Mayen, Norway

Coordinates: 70°57.3′N 8°46.7′W

Engelskbukta (English: English Bay) is a broad, open bay mid-way up the west coast of the Norwegian island of Jan Mayen. It lies between Kapp Rudsen and Kvalrossen, comprising Kvalrossbukta and Tømmerbukta. Presumably this is where the English resorted to in 1616, when they sent their first whaling ships to the island. The Dutch whalers called it Noordbaai (North Bay) and used it for one of their two main whaling stations. In 1632 two Basque whaling ships plundered the station, causing the Dutch to send a wintering party of seven men in 1633–34. All perished.

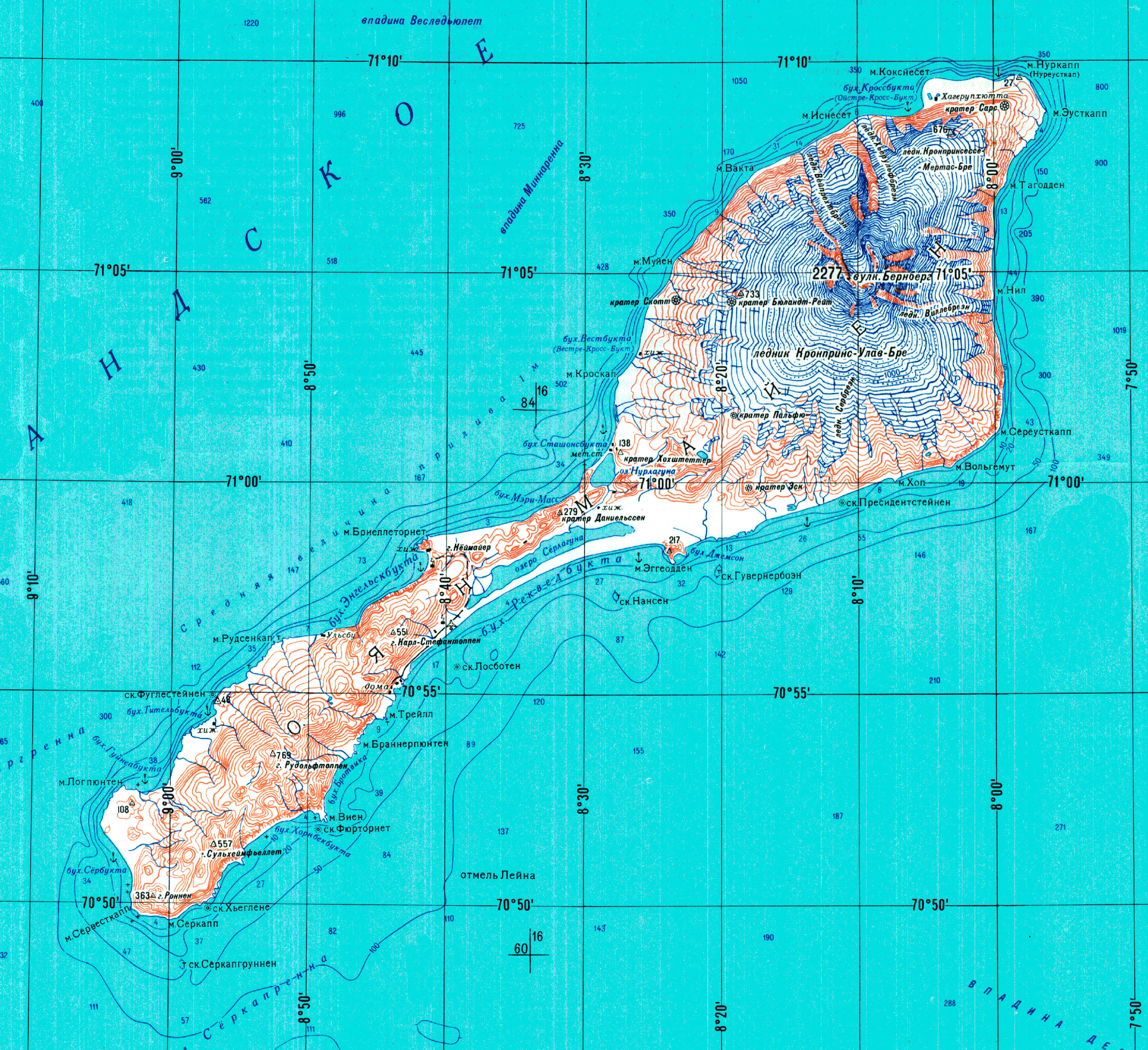
Topographic map of Jan Mayen

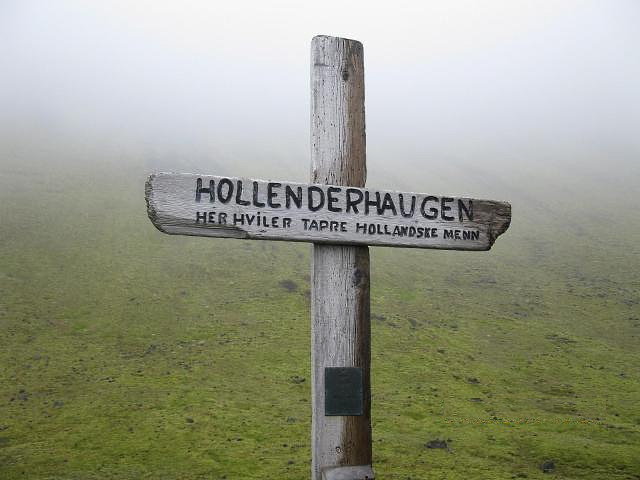
"HOLLENDERHAUGEN. HER HVILER TAPRE HOLLANDSKE MENN." Old cross on the grave of seven Dutchmen, reading "The Dutch men's hill. Here rest brave Dutch men".
