= Jan Mayensfield =

Aerodrome serving Olonkinbyen in Jan Mayen, Norway

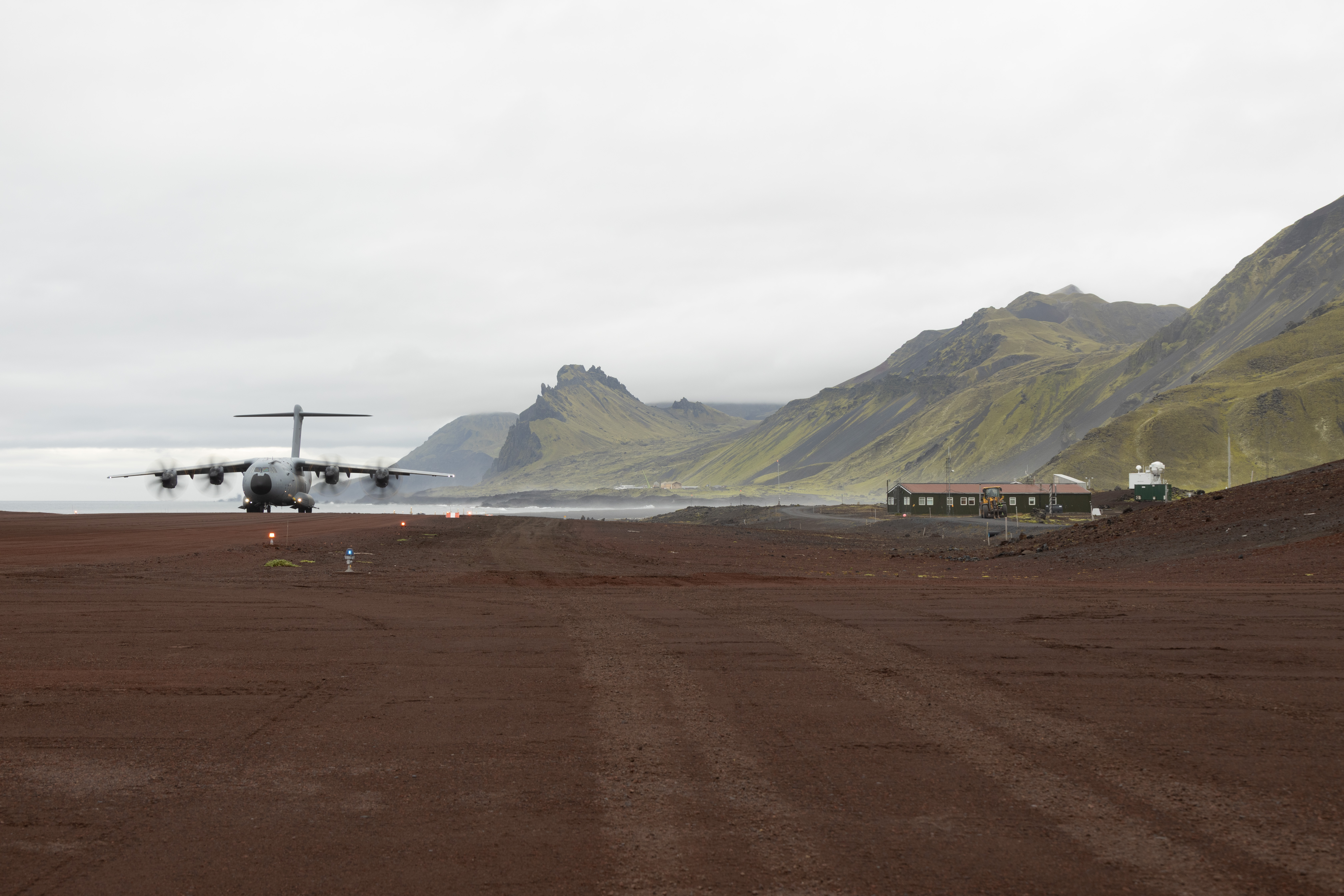
- An Airbus A400M of the RAF at Jan Mayensfield (2025)
- IATA: ZXB; ICAO: ENJA

Summary
- Airport type: Military
- Operator: Norwegian Armed Forces
- Location: Olonkinbyen, Jan Mayen, Norway
- Elevation AMSL: 39 ft / 12 m
- Coordinates: 70°57′40″N 008°34′33″W
- Website: Airfield «Jan Mayensfield»

Map
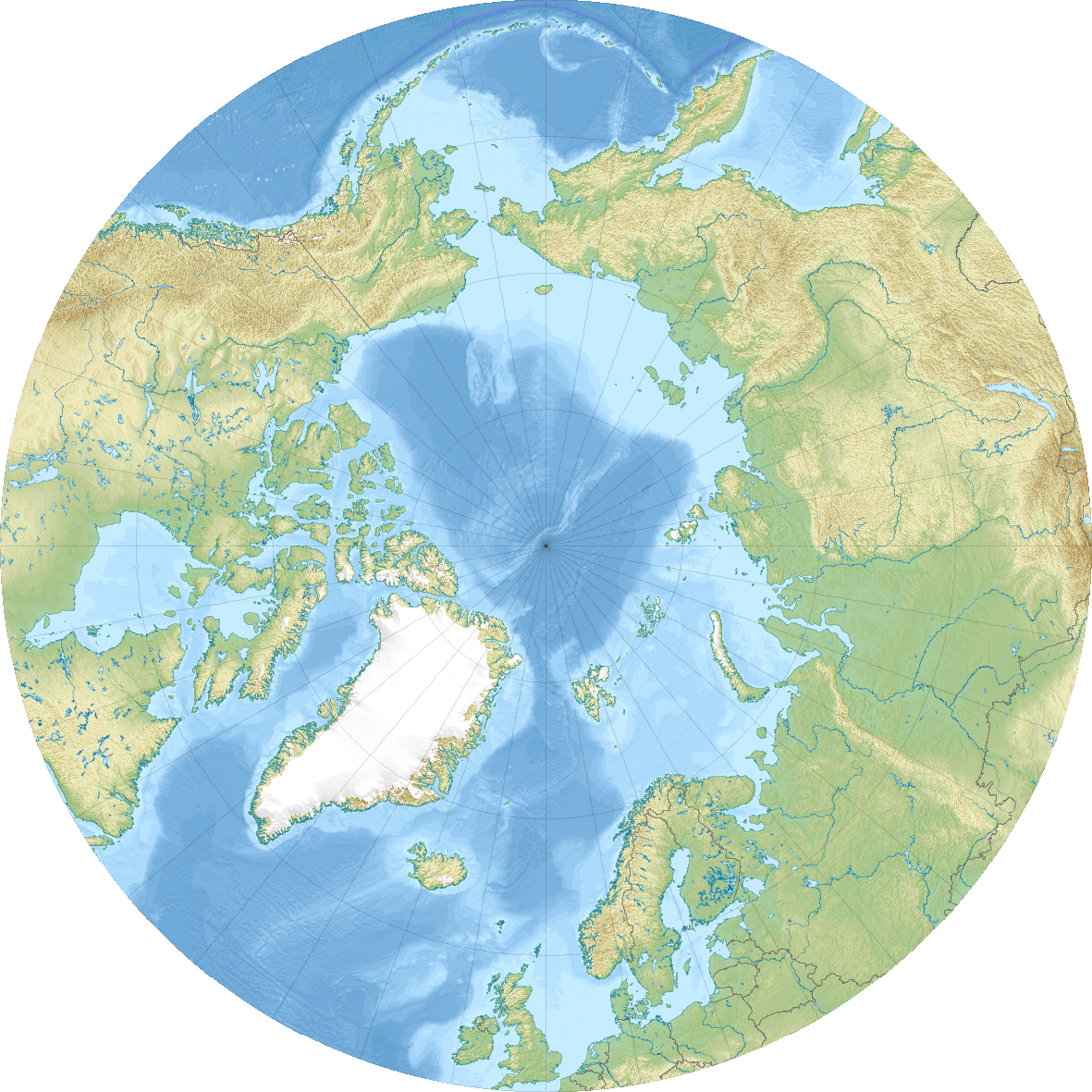
- Location on a map of Europe Location on a map of the Arctic

Runways
Direction	Length		Surface
Direction	m	ft	Surface
04–22	1,500	4,921	Dirt

Jan Mayensfield (ICAO: ENJA) is an aerodrome serving Olonkinbyen in Jan Mayen, Norway. Operated by the Norwegian Armed Forces, it serves the island's only population at the combined military and meteorological station. It has a 1,500-meter (4,921 ft) dirt runway numbered 04–22.

The airfield was built in connection with the LORAN-C transmitter at Olonkinbyen and was completed in 1960. Jan Mayensfield is served eight times per year by Lockheed C-130 Hercules aircraft of the 335 Squadron from Bodø Main Air Station, which provide supplies and change crew at the outpost. The nearby Beerenberg volcano can cause a Kármán wind, which creates difficult landing conditions.

== History ==
North Atlantic Treaty Organization (NATO) and the Norwegian Armed Forces started construction of a military communications outpost at Olonkinbyen in 1958. At first a LORAN-A transmitter was built, followed by a LORAN-C transmitter in 1960. In August, it was announced that the island would receive an airfield to allow continual operation of the transmitter. Originally, the aerodrome consisted of a 1,200 by 30 metres (3,937 by 98 ft) section of the island's dirt road. This was chosen to reduce the bureaucracy of construction. The first aircraft to land was a Consolidated PBY Catalina of the Royal Norwegian Air Force on 17 September 1960.

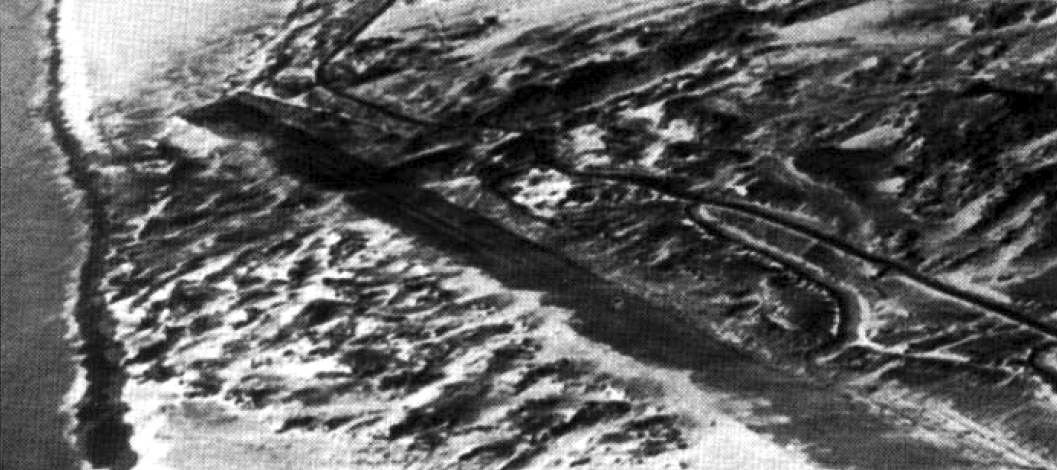
The runway circa 1968

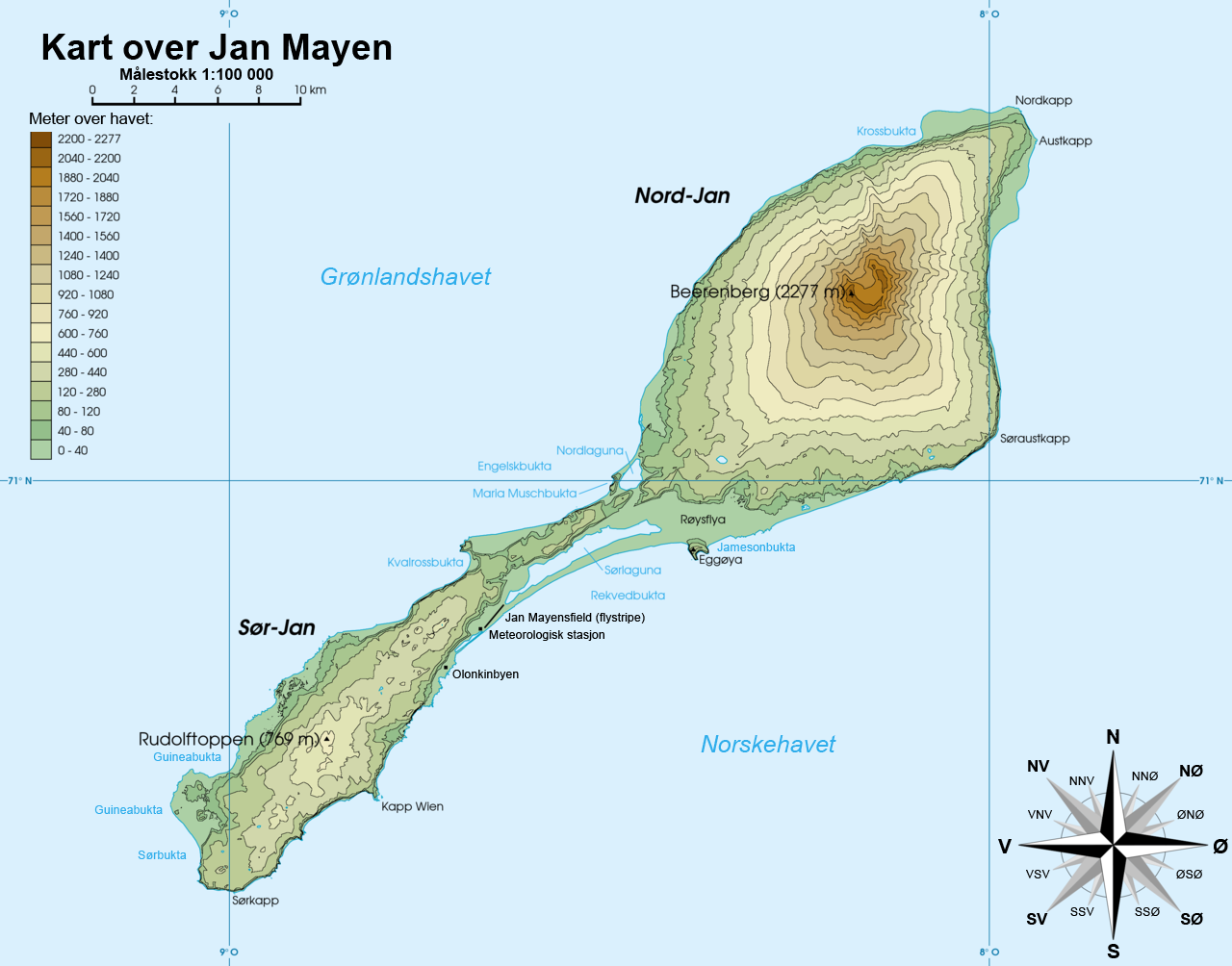
Map which includes the location of the airfield

The first civilian aircraft was a Douglas DC-4 operated by Braathens SAFE, which landed with some journalists on board on 29 October 1961. Other early aircraft operating to Jan Mayen were the Grumman HU-16 Albatross and the Douglas DC-6. The head officer of the Norwegian military's communications division was later criticized by Chief of Defence Bjarne Øen, who concluded: "Gentlemen, I will not have any further construction of airports on Norwegian soil by the Communications Division without the plans being presented to the Central Command." The field was named Jan Mayensfield, in part as a joke having the movie star Jayne Mansfield in mind, but this name stuck.

In 1970, a sudden eruption in Beerenberg forced the immediate evacuation of the station. A Hercules was dispatched to the island and successfully landed on the strip. Thereafter the Hercules became the regular military aircraft at Jan Mayen. Aircraft gradually took over more of the transport to the island, and from 1973 all supplies except diesel and special freight was transported by ship. From 1975 the 333 Squadron would occasionally drop mail and supplies using the P-3 Orion as a supplement to the landings of the Hercules.

== Facilities ==
Jan Mayensfield's single regular service is the Royal Norwegian Air Force's Lockheed C-130 Hercules, which operate to the island eight times per year. The aircraft are part of the 335 Squadron, based at Gardermoen Air Station, although the flights from Jan Mayen operate from Bodø Main Air Station. The runway is not open for commercial traffic, although it can be used for research and search and rescue operations.

The dirt runway is 1,500 by 30 meters (4,921 by 98 ft) being aligned 06–24. Jan Mayensfield has variable weather conditions, a lot of fog and often has a Kármán wind. The Kármán wind is created in the wake of the Beerenberg volcano, resulting in regular vortex streets and lee-waves. This can cause sudden change to the wind direction on the island.

== Accidents and incidents ==
In 1991, a C-130 Hercules aircraft from the Royal Norwegian Air Force almost crashed after takeoff due to Kármán wind suddenly shifting.

A World War II Focke Wulf 200 C4 plane crash site is also near the airfield.
