= Jan Mayen =

Norwegian island in the Arctic Ocean

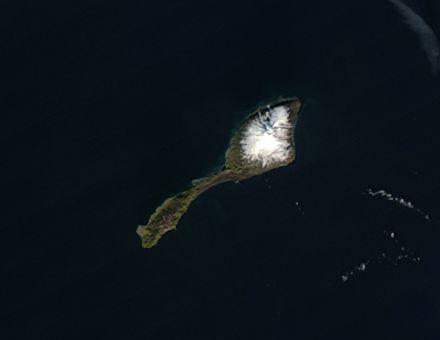
- 2004 NASA satellite image of Jan Mayen, Beerenberg covered with snow
- Interactive map of Jan Mayen

Geography
- Location: Arctic Ocean
- Coordinates: 70°59′N 8°32′W
- Area: 377 km^{2} (146 sq mi)
- Coastline: 124,100 m (407200 ft)
- Highest elevation: 2,277 m (7470 ft)
- Highest point: Beerenberg

Administration
- Norway
- Unincorporated area: Jan Mayen
- Largest settlement: Olonkinbyen (pop. 35)

Demographics
- Population: 0 (up to 35 non-permanent residents)

Additional information
- Time zone: CET (UTC+01:00)
- Postal code: 8099
- ISO 3166 code: NO-22

Jan Mayen (Urban East Norwegian: [jɑn ˈmɑ̀ɪən]) is a Norwegian volcanic island in the Arctic Ocean with no permanent population. It is 55 km (34 mi) long (southwest-northeast) and 377 km^{2} (146 sq mi) in area, partly covered by glaciers (an area of 114.2 km^{2} (44.1 sq mi) around the Beerenberg volcano). It has two parts: larger northeast Nord-Jan and smaller Sør-Jan, linked by a 2.5 km (1.6 mi) wide isthmus. It lies 600 km (370 mi) northeast of Iceland (495 km [305 mi] NE of Kolbeinsey), 500 km (310 mi) east of central Greenland, and 900 km (560 mi) northwest of Vesterålen, Norway.

The island is mountainous, the highest summit being the Beerenberg volcano in the north. The isthmus is the location of the two largest lakes of the island, Sørlaguna (South Lagoon) and Nordlaguna (North Lagoon). A third lake is called Ullerenglaguna (Ullereng Lagoon). Jan Mayen was formed by the Jan Mayen hotspot and is defined by geologists as a microcontinent.

Although administered separately, in the ISO 3166-1 standard, Jan Mayen and Svalbard are collectively designated as Svalbard and Jan Mayen, with the two-letter country code "SJ". It was also given the Internet domain of .sj. However, the domain is not in use and Norway's .no is used in its place.

Jan Mayen is home to Beerenberg, which is the northernmost subaerial active volcano in the world.

== Natural resources ==
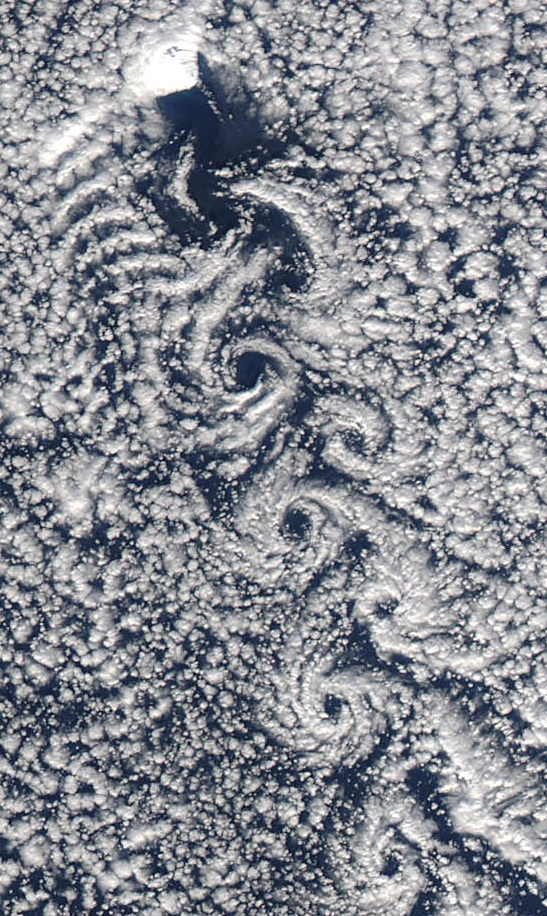
Kármán vortex street created by Beerenberg volcano in the westerly winds

Jan Mayen Island has one exploitable natural resource, gravel, from a site located at Trongskaret. Other than this, economic activity is limited to providing services for employees of Norway's radio communications and meteorological stations located on the island. Jan Mayen has one unpaved airstrip, Jan Mayensfield, which is about 1,585 m (5,200 ft) long. The 124.1 km (77.1 mi) coast has no ports or harbors, only offshore anchorages.

There are important fishing resources, and the existence of Jan Mayen establishes a large exclusive economic zone (EEZ) around it. Norway has asserted a 200-nautical-mile (370-kilometre) EEZ around the island since 1980 encompassing more than a quarter of a million square kilometers. The Norwegian Coast Guard is responsible for conducting fishery and other maritime surveillance and enforcement in these waters.

Norway has found large deposits of minerals along the Mid-Atlantic Ridge between Jan Mayen and southern Svalbard/Bear Island, including copper, zinc, cobalt, gold and silver. The expeditions have also discovered high concentrations of lithium and scandium. In total, it is estimated that the amount of copper could amount to 21.7 million tonnes, but other estimates are around 7 million tonnes. Licensing for deep sea mining was under consideration in 2021.

A dispute between Norway and Denmark regarding the fishing exclusion zone between Jan Mayen and Greenland was settled in 1988 granting Denmark the greater area of sovereignty. Geologists suspect significant deposits of petroleum and natural gas lie below Jan Mayen's surrounding seafloors.

In 2021, the Regulation on the protection of Jan Mayen Nature Reserve was last consolidated. It labeled the island as a protected nature reserve of Norway (with the exception of the area which holds several pre-existing buildings and a smaller area to the west). This protection forbids continued development in locations which may harm native flora, fauna, and the environment.

== Status ==
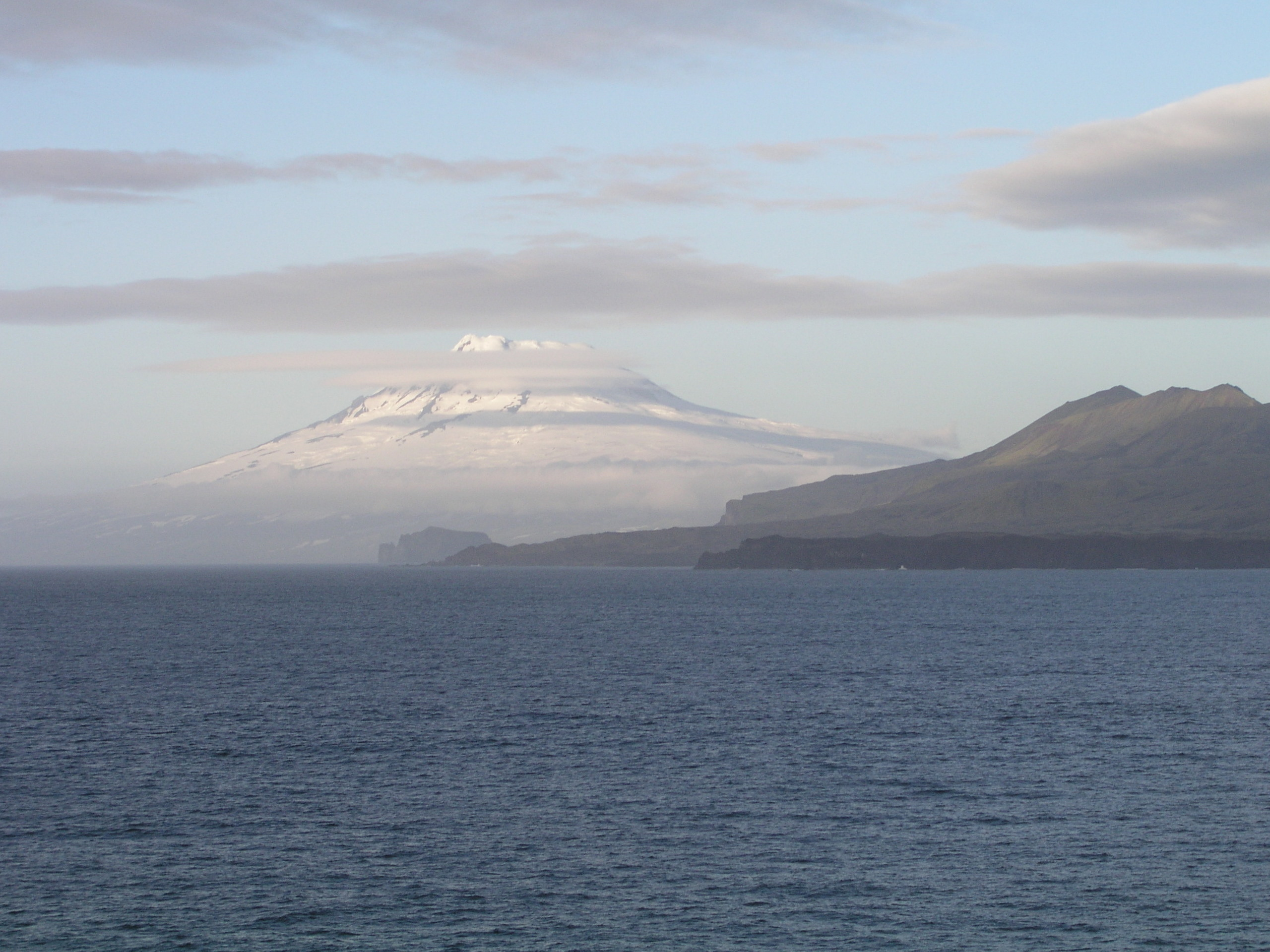
The snow-covered Beerenberg volcano beyond the coastal hills

Jan Mayen Island is an integral part of the Kingdom of Norway. Since 1995, Jan Mayen has been administered by the County Governor (statsforvalter) of the northern Norwegian county of Nordland, to which it is closest. However, some authority over Jan Mayen has been assigned to the station commander of the Norwegian Defence Logistics Organisation, a branch of the Norwegian Armed Forces. In late-2025, the Norwegian defence ministry presented a draft proposal for the possible expansion of military police authority on the island. According to the proposal, under the "Military Police Act" a “military area can be established and enforced on the island – as an officer in the Armed Forces, the station commander there will also have authority to intervene to maintain security and prevent or stop law violations.”

== Society ==
=== Demography ===
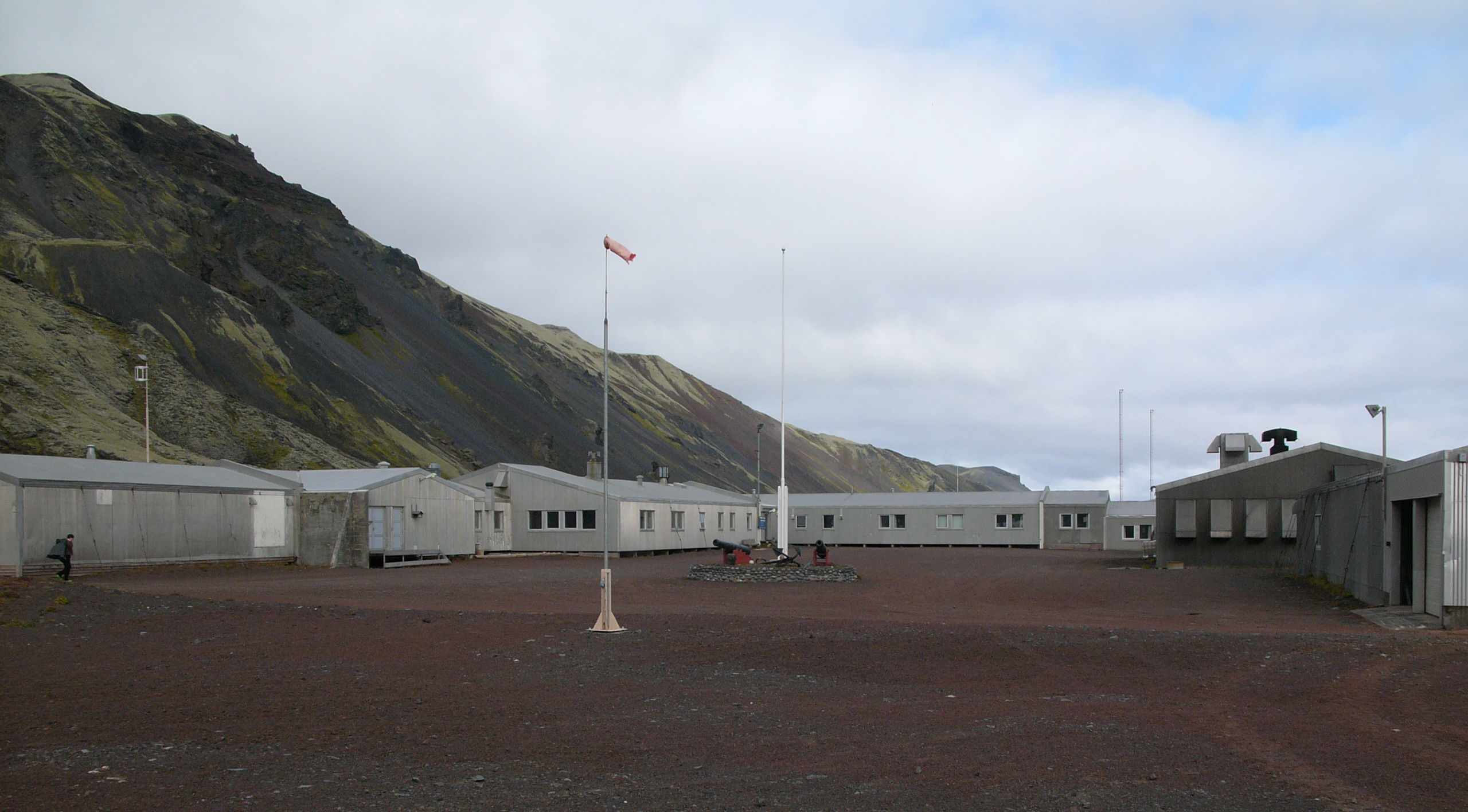
Olonkinbyen in August

The only inhabitants on the island are personnel working for the Norwegian Armed Forces and the Norwegian Meteorological Institute. Eighteen people spend the winter on the island, but the population may roughly double (35) during the summer, when heavy maintenance is performed. Personnel serve either six months or one year and are exchanged twice a year in April and October. The support crew, including mechanics, cooks, and a nurse, are among the military personnel. The military personnel operated a Loran-C base until it closed at the end of 2015. Both the LORAN transmitter and the meteorological station are located a few kilometres away from the settlement Olonkinbyen (Olonkin Town), where all personnel live.

=== Transport ===
Transport to the island is provided by C-130 Hercules military transport planes operated by the Royal Norwegian Air Force which land at Jan Mayensfield's gravel runway. The planes fly in from Bodø Main Air Station eight times a year. Since the airport does not have any instrument landing capabilities, good visibility is required, and it is not uncommon for the planes to have to return to Bodø Airport, two hours away, without landing. For heavy goods, freight ships visit during the summer, but since there are no harbours, the ships must anchor. Tourists arrive with cruise ships which are allowed to bring passengers onshore if weather permits.

=== Communication ===
The island has no indigenous population but is assigned the ISO 3166-1 alpha-2 country code SJ (together with Svalbard). It uses the internet country code top-level domain (ccTLD) .no (.sj is allocated but not used) and data code JN. Jan Mayen has telephone and internet connection over satellite, using Norwegian telephone numbers (country code 47). Its amateur radio call sign prefix is JX; the island is occasionally the venue for a DXpedition. It has a postal code, NO-8099 JAN MAYEN, but delivery time varies, especially during the winter.

=== Business ===
There are no exploitable resources on Jan Mayen, except fish in the surrounding waters of the Island and gravel. The economic activity is limited to the operation of the station that is staffed by the Norwegian Cyberdefence and the Norwegian Meteorological Institute. There has also been established a reference station for EGNOS. There is also a reference station for the satellite navigation system Galileo on Jan Mayen. There was also an earlier Jan Mayen LORAN-C Transmitter, but the transmitter is now decommissioned and demolished.

=== Jan Mayen Radio ===
Jan Mayen Radio was a Norwegian coastal radio station on Jan Mayen. The first radio station was built in 1921 on a part of the island called "Eldsmetten - Norwegian" on the eastern side of the Island. The radio station consisted of a 3 kW Telefunken spark-gap transmitter and a 55 m (180 ft) wooden radio mast. Fearing a German occupation, the station was destroyed in September 1940, and the crew was sent to Iceland.

In 1941 a new radio station was constructed on the western side of the island, it was moved to a plateau above. In 1962 this station was again moved to "Helenesanden - Norwegian" about 3 km (1.9 mi) north from the Norwegian army's LORAN-station.

In 1984 the station was moved to the Norwegian army's station. In 1989 there was a VHF-receiver installed, and later in October 1994 the local control of the radio station was terminated. Before the local control was terminated a MF-Digital-Selcall-receiver was installed and controlled remotely from Bodø-Radio. The station is still (Jan 2024) controlled remotely via satellite, but can be taken in local control by a disconnection against Eik Satellite Earth Station in Rogaland Norway.

== History ==
=== Unverified "discoveries" of a terra nullius ===
In the Golden Age of Dutch exploration and discovery (c. 1590s–1720s), Dutch navigators were the first non-natives to undisputedly explore and map many largely unknown isolated areas of the world, including Jan Mayen and the Svalbard archipelago in the Arctic Ocean.

The land named Svalbarð ("cold coast") by the Vikings in the early medieval book Landnámabók may have been Jan Mayen (instead of Spitsbergen, renamed Svalbard by the Norwegians in modern times); the distance from Iceland to Svalbarð mentioned in this book is two days' sailing (with favorable winds), consistent with the approximate 550 km (340 mi) to Jan Mayen and not with the minimum 1,550 km (960 mi) to Spitsbergen. However much Jan Mayen may have been known in Europe at that time, it was subsequently forgotten for some centuries.

In the 17th century, many claims of the island's rediscovery were made, spurred by the rivalry on the Arctic whaling grounds, and the island received many names. According to Thomas Edge, an early 17th-century whaling captain who was often inaccurate, "William [sic] Hudson" discovered the island in 1608 and named it "Hudson's Touches" (or "Tutches"). However, the well-known explorer Henry Hudson could only have come by on his voyage in 1607 (if he had made an illogical detour) and he made no mention of it in his journal.

According to William Scoresby (1820: p. 154), referring to the mistaken belief that the Dutch had discovered the island in 1611, Hull whalers discovered the island "about the same time" and named it "Trinity Island". Muller (1874: pp. 190–191) took this to mean they had come upon Jan Mayen in 1611 or 1612, which was repeated by many subsequent authors. There were, in fact, no Hull whalers in either of these years, the first Hull whaling expedition having been sent to the island only in 1616 (see below). As with the previous claim made by Edge, there is no cartographical or written proof for this supposed discovery.

=== During the Golden Age of Dutch exploration and discovery (c. 1590s–1720s) ===
==== First verified discoveries: mapping and naming ====
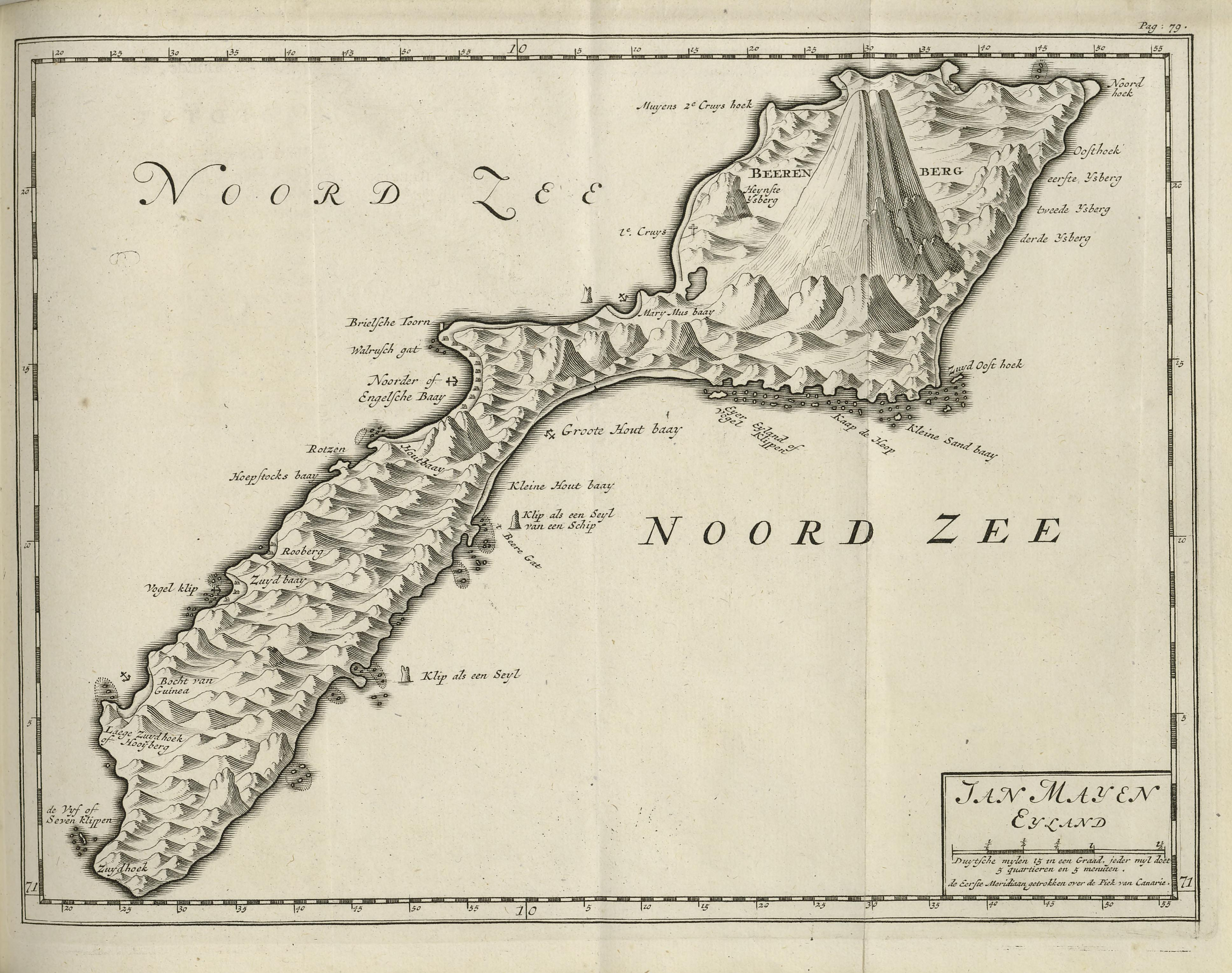
A map of Jan Mayen during the Golden Age of Dutch exploration and discovery (c. 1590s–1720s). This is a typical map created by Dutch cartographers from the Golden Age of Netherlandish cartography.

The first verified discoveries of Jan Mayen, by three separate expeditions, occurred in the summer of 1614, probably within one month of each other. The Dutchman Fopp Gerritsz, whilst in command of a whaling expedition sent out by the Englishman John Clarke, of Dunkirk, claimed (in 1631) to have discovered the island on 28 June and named it "Isabella". In January the Noordsche Compagnie (Northern Company), modelled on the Dutch East India Company, had been established to support Dutch whaling in the Arctic. Two of its ships, financed by merchants from Amsterdam and Enkhuizen, reached Jan Mayen in July 1614.

The captains of these ships—Jan Jacobszoon May van Schellinkhout (after whom the island was ultimately named) on the Gouden Cath (Golden Cat), and Jacob de Gouwenaer on the Orangienboom (Orange Tree)—named it Mr. Joris Eylant after the Dutch cartographer Joris Carolus who was on board and mapped the island. The captains acknowledged that a third Dutch ship, the Cleyn Swaentgen (Little Swan) captained by Jan Jansz Kerckhoff and financed by Noordsche Compagnie shareholders from Delft, had already been at the island when they arrived. They had assumed the latter, who named the island Maurits Eylandt (or Mauritius) after Maurice of Nassau, Prince of Orange, would report their discovery to the States General. However, the Delft merchants had decided to keep the discovery secret and returned in 1615 to hunt for their own profit. The ensuing dispute was only settled in 1617, though both companies were allowed to whale at Jan Mayen in the meantime.

In 1615, the English whaler Robert Fotherby went ashore. Apparently thinking he had made a new discovery, he named the island "Sir Thomas Smith's Island" and the volcano "Mount Hakluyt". On a map of c. 1634, Jean Vrolicq renamed the island Île de Richelieu.

Jan Mayen first appeared on Willem Jansz Blaeu's 1620 edition map of Europe, originally published by Cornelis Doedz in 1606. Blaeu, who lived in Amsterdam, named it "Jan Mayen" after captain Jan Jacobszoon May van Schellinkhout of the Amsterdam-financed Gouden Cath. Blaeu made the first detailed map of the island in his famous "Zeespiegel" atlas of 1623, establishing its current name.

==== Dutch whaling base ====
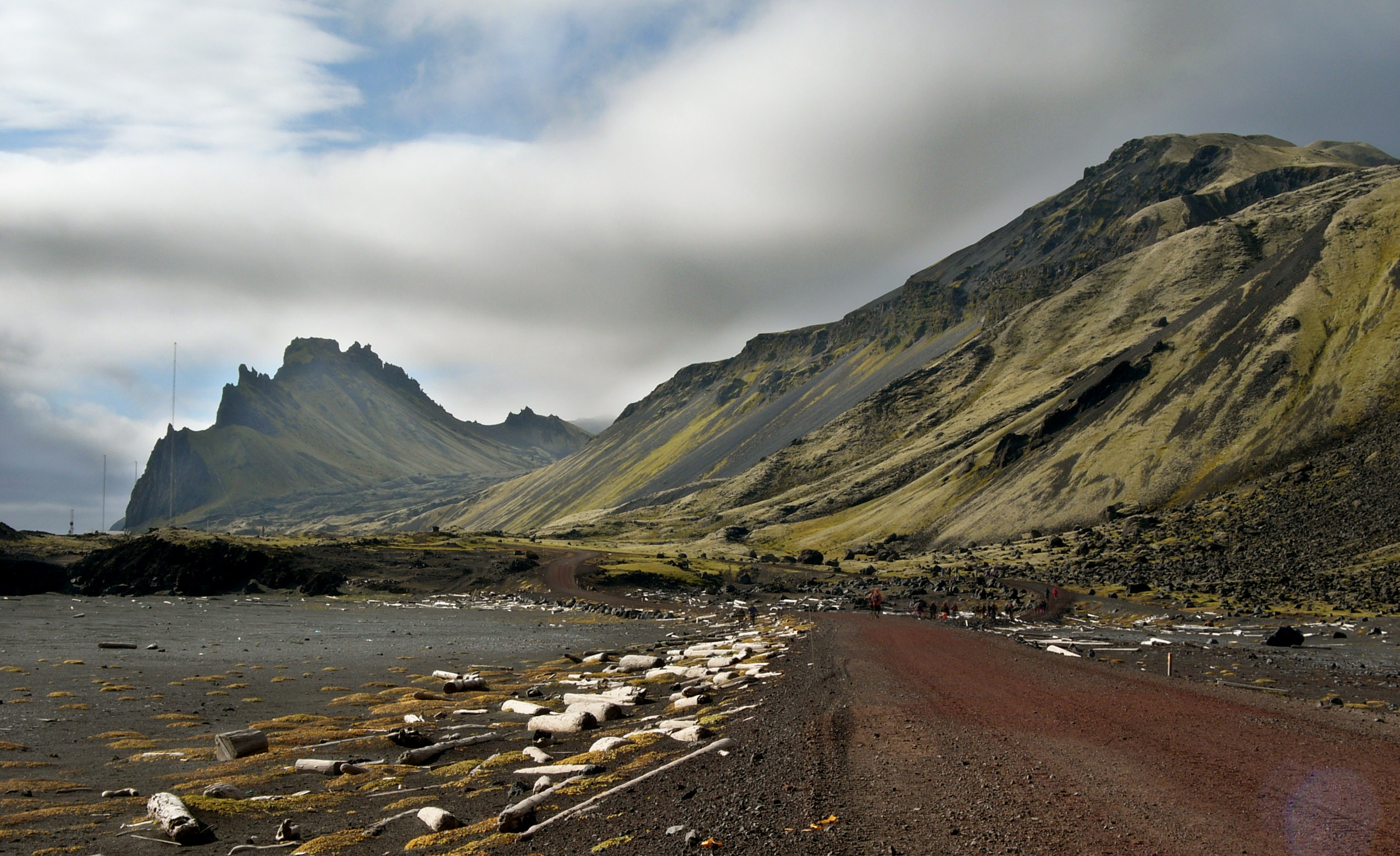
Road along the west coast, about 500 metres (1,600 ft) off the station

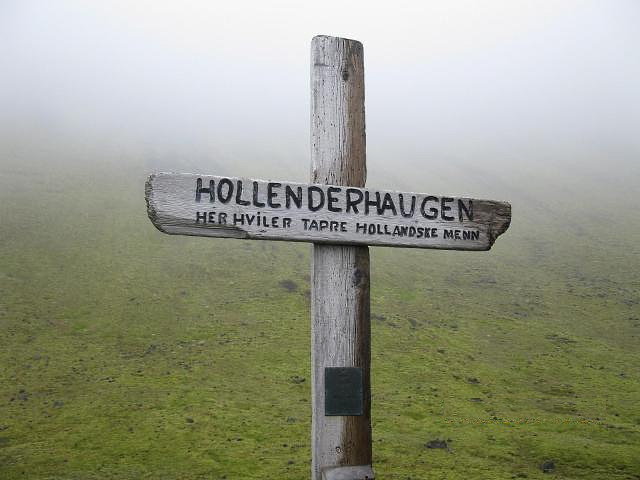
"HOLLENDERHAUGEN. HER HVILER TAPRE HOLLANDSKE MENN." Old cross on the grave of seven Dutchmen, reading "The Dutch men's hill. Here rest brave Dutch men".

From 1615 to 1638, Jan Mayen was used as a whaling base by the Dutch Noordsche Compagnie, which had been given a monopoly on whaling in the Arctic regions by the States General in 1614. Only two ships, one from the Noordsche Compagnie, and the other from the Delft merchants, were off Jan Mayen in 1615.

The following year a score of vessels were sent to the island. The Noordsche Compagnie sent eight ships escorted by three warships under Jan Jacobsz. Schrobop; while the Delft merchants sent up five ships under Adriaen Dircksz. Leversteyn, son of one of the above merchants. There were also two ships from Dunkirk sent by John Clarke, as well as a ship each from London and Hull.

Heertje Jansz, master of the Hope, of Enkhuizen, wrote a day-by-day account of the season. The ships took two weeks to reach Jan Mayen, arriving early in June. On 15 June they met the two English ships, which Schrobop allowed to remain, on condition they gave half their catch to the Dutch. The ships from Dunkirk were given the same conditions. By late July the first ship had left with a full cargo of whale oil; the rest left early in August, several filled with oil.

That year 200 men were seasonally living and working on the island at six temporary whaling stations (spread along the northwest coast). During the first decade of whaling, more than ten ships visited Jan Mayen each year, while in the second period (1624 and later) five to ten ships were sent. With the exception of a few ships from Dunkirk, which came to the island in 1617 and were either driven away or forced to give a third of their catch to the Dutch, only the Dutch and merchants from Hull sent up ships to Jan Mayen from 1616 onward. In 1624 ten wooden houses were built in South Bay. About this time the Dutch appear to have abandoned the temporary stations consisting of tents of sail and crude furnaces, replacing them with two semi-permanent stations with wooden storehouses and dwellings and large brick furnaces, one in the above-mentioned South Bay and the other in the North Bay. In 1628 two forts were built to protect the stations. Among the sailors active at Jan Mayen was the later admiral Michiel Adriaensz de Ruyter. In 1633, at the age of 26, he was for the first time listed as an officer aboard de Groene Leeuw (The Green Lion). He again went to Jan Mayen in 1635, aboard the same ship.

In 1632 the Noordsche Compagnie expelled the Danish-employed Basque whalers from Spitsbergen. In revenge, the latter sailed to Jan Mayen, where the Dutch had left for the winter, to plunder the Dutch equipment and burn down the settlements and factories. Captain Outger Jacobsz of Grootebroek was asked to stay the next winter (1633/34) on Jan Mayen with six shipmates to defend the island. While a group with the same task survived the winter on Spitsbergen, all seven on Jan Mayen died of scurvy or trichinosis (from eating raw polar bear meat) combined with the harsh conditions.

During the first phase of whaling the hauls were generally good, some exceptional. For example, Mathijs Jansz. Hoepstock caught 44 whales in Hoepstockbukta in 1619, which produced 2,300 casks of whale oil. During the second phase the hauls were much lower. While 1631 turned out to be a very good season, the following year, due to the weather and ice, only eight whales were caught. In 1633 eleven ships managed to catch just 47 whales; while a meager 42 were caught by the same number in 1635. The bowhead whale was locally hunted to near-extinction around 1640 (approximately 1000 had been killed and processed on the island), at which time Jan Mayen was abandoned and stayed uninhabited for two and a half centuries.

=== 19th- and 20th-century expeditions ===
Map of settlements on Jan Mayen

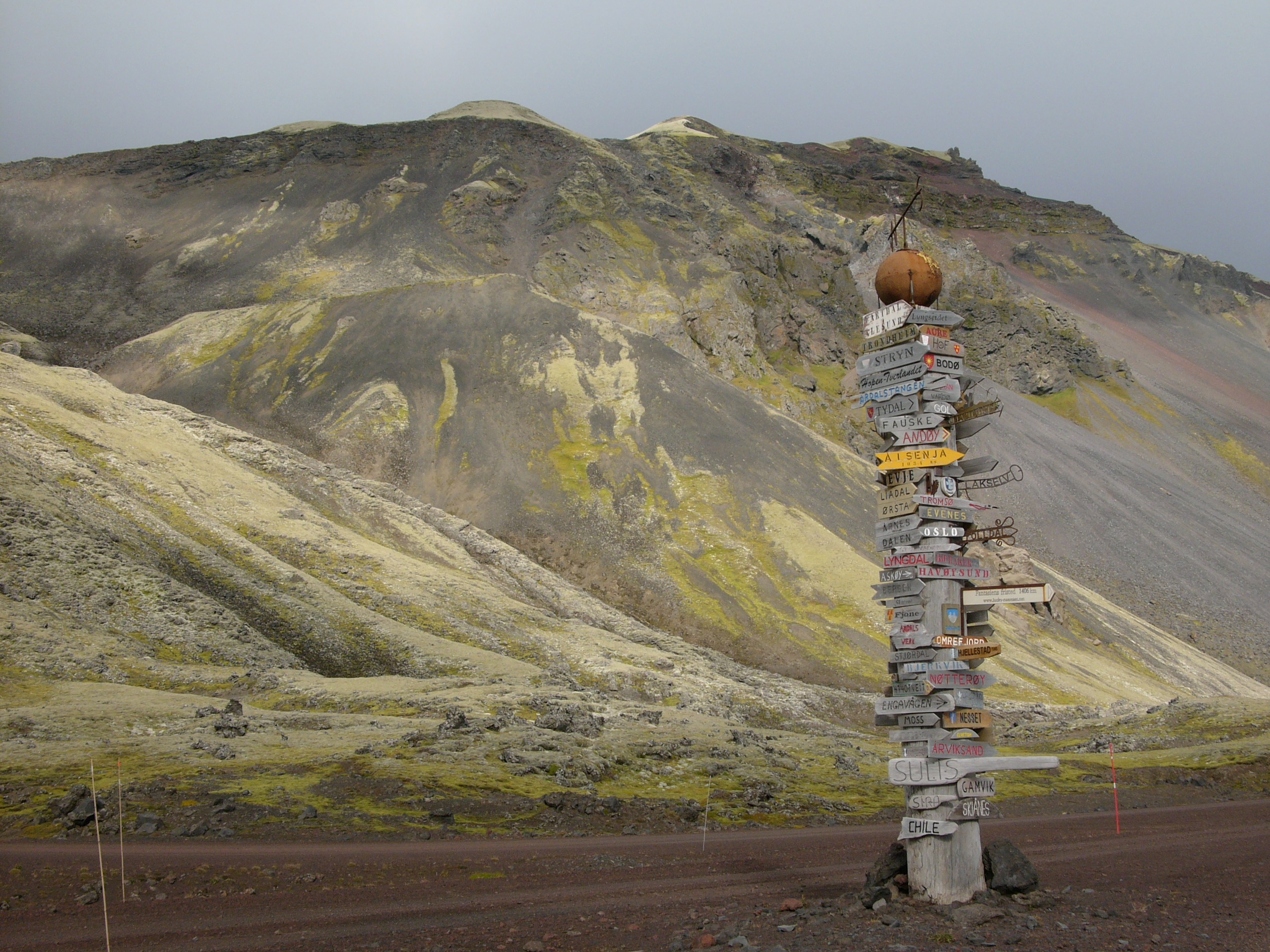
Traditional signpost with directions to civilization on Jan Mayen station

During the International Polar Year 1882–1883 the Austro-Hungarian North Pole Expedition stayed one year at Jan Mayen. The expedition performed extensive mapping of the area, their maps being of such quality that they were used until the 1950s. The Austrian polar station on Jan Mayen Island was built and equipped in 1882 fully at Count Wilczek's own expense.

Polar bears appear on Jan Mayen, although in diminished numbers compared with earlier times. Between 1900 and 1920, there were a number of Norwegian trappers spending winters on Jan Mayen, hunting Arctic foxes in addition to some polar bears. But the exploitation soon made the profits decline, and the hunting ended. Polar bears in this region of the Arctic are genetically distinguishable from those living elsewhere.

The League of Nations gave Norway jurisdiction over the island, and in 1921 Norway opened the first meteorological station. The Norwegian Meteorological Institute annexed the middle part of the island for Norway in 1922 and the whole island in 1926 when Hallvard Devold was head of the weather observations base on the island. On 27 February 1930, the island was made de jure a part of the Kingdom of Norway.

=== Second World War ===
During World War II, continental Norway was invaded and occupied by Germany in spring 1940. The four-man team on Jan Mayen stayed at their posts and in an act of defiance began sending their weather reports to the United Kingdom instead of Norway. The British codenamed Jan Mayen 'Island X' and attempted to reinforce it with troops to counteract any German attack.

On 8 November 1940 the Norwegian patrol boat HNoMS Fridtjof Nansen ran aground on Nansenflua, one of the islands' many uncharted lava reefs, and the 68-man crew abandoned ship and joined the Norwegian team on shore. The British expedition commander, prompted by the loss of the gunboat, decided to abandon Jan Mayen until the following spring and radioed for a rescue ship. Within a few days a ship arrived and evacuated the four Norwegians and their would-be reinforcements, after demolishing the weather station to prevent it from falling into German hands.

The Germans attempted to land a weather team on the island on 16 November 1940; the German naval trawler carrying the team crashed on the rocks just off Jan Mayen after a patrolling British destroyer had picked them up on radar. The detection was not by chance, as the German plan had been compromised from the beginning with British wireless interceptors of the Radio Security Service following the communications of the Abwehr (the German Intelligence service) concerning the operation, and the destroyer had been waiting. Most of the crew struggled ashore and were taken prisoner by a landing party from the destroyer.

The Allies returned to the island on 10 March 1941, when the Norwegian ship Veslekari, escorted by the patrol boat Honningsvaag, dropped 12 Norwegian weathermen on the island. The team's radio transmissions soon betrayed its presence to the Axis, and German planes from Norway began to bomb and strafe Jan Mayen whenever weather permitted, but did little damage. Soon supplies and reinforcements arrived, and even some anti-aircraft guns, giving the island a garrison of a few dozen weathermen and soldiers. By 1941, Germany had given up hope of evicting the Allies from the island and the constant air raids stopped.

On 7 August 1942, a German Focke-Wulf Fw 200 "Condor", probably on a mission to bomb the station, crashed into the nearby mountainside of Danielssenkrateret in fog, killing its crew of nine, and at an unknown date another German plane with four crew members crashed on the southwest side of the island, this crash only becoming public knowledge when the crash site was discovered in 1950. In 1943, the Americans established a radio locating station named Atlantic City in the north to try to locate German radio bases in Greenland.

=== Cold War ===
After the war, the meteorological station was located at Atlantic City, but moved in 1949 to a new location. Radio Jan Mayen also served as an important radio station for ship traffic in the Arctic Ocean. In 1959 NATO started building the LORAN-C network in sites on the Atlantic Ocean; one of the transmitters was to be on Jan Mayen. By 1961 the new military installations, including a new airfield, were operational.

For some time scientists doubted that the Beerenberg volcano would become active, but in 1970 it erupted for about three weeks, adding another 3 km^{2} (1.2 sq mi) of land area to the island. It also erupted in 1973 and 1985. During an eruption, the sea temperature around the island may increase from just above freezing to about 30 °C (86 °F).

Iceland and Norway had a brief territorial dispute over the island from 1979-1980, with the dispute being resolved with Iceland recognising Norwegian sovereignty over the island.

Historic stations and huts on the island are Hoyberg, Vera, Olsbu, Puppebu (cabin), Gamlemetten or Gamlestasjonen (the old weather station), Jan Mayen Radio, Helenehytta, Margarethhytta, and Ulla (a cabin at the foot of the Beerenberg).

== Environment ==
=== Nature reserve ===
A regulation dating from 2010 renders the island a nature reserve under Norwegian jurisdiction. The aim of this regulation is to ensure the preservation of a pristine Arctic island and the marine life nearby, including the ocean floor. Landings at Jan Mayen can be done by boat. However, this is permitted only at a small part of the island, named Båtvika (Boat Bay).

As there is no commercial airline operating at the island, one cannot get there by plane except by chartering one. Permission for landings by a charter plane has to be obtained in advance. Permission to stay on the island has to be obtained in advance, and is generally limited to a few days (or even hours). Putting up a tent or setting up camp is prohibited. There is a separate regulation for the stay of foreigners.

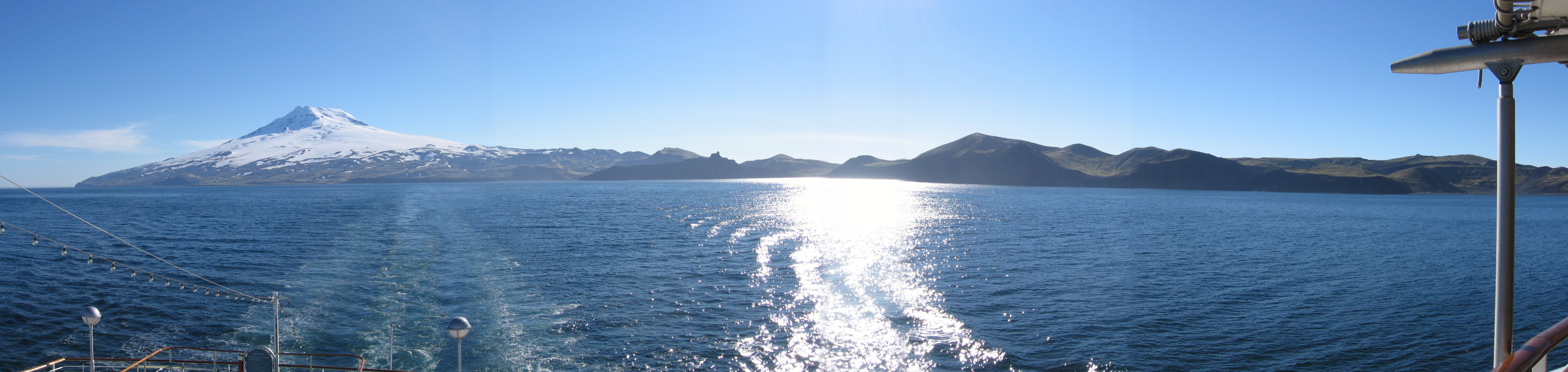
Panoramic photo of the northwest coast of Jan Mayen

=== Geography and geology ===
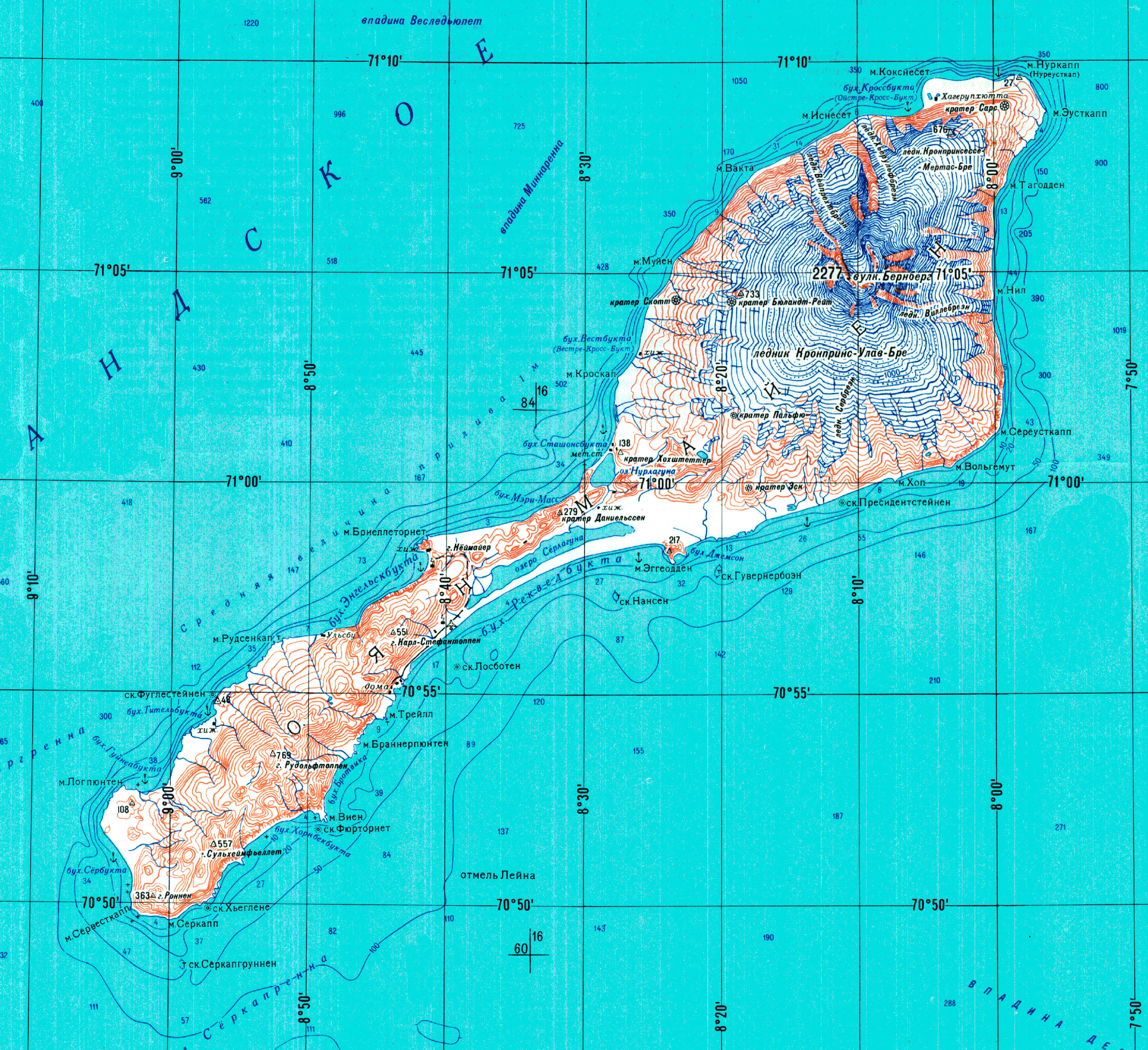
Soviet topographic map

Jan Mayen consists of two geographically distinct parts. Nord-Jan has a round shape and is dominated by the 2,277 m (7,470 ft) high Beerenberg volcano with its large ice cap (114.2 km^{2} or 44 sq mi), which can be divided into twenty individual outlet glaciers. The largest of those is Sørbreen, with an area of 15 km^{2} (5.8 sq mi) and a length of 8.7 km (5.41 mi). South-Jan is narrow, comparatively flat and unglaciated. Its highest elevation is Rudolftoppen at 769 m (2,523 ft). The station and living quarters are located on South-Jan. The island lies at the northern end of the Jan Mayen Microcontinent. The microcontinent was originally part of the Greenland Plate, but now forms part of the Eurasian Plate.

=== Important Bird Area ===
The island was identified as an Important Bird Area (IBA) by BirdLife International because it is a breeding site for large numbers of seabirds, supporting populations of northern fulmars (78,000–160,000 pairs), little auks (10,000–100,000 pairs), thick-billed guillemot (74,000–147,000 pairs) and black guillemots (100–1,000 pairs).

=== Climate ===
Jan Mayen has an oceanic polar climate with a Köppen classification of ET, sometimes reckoned as EM (maritime polar). Jan Mayen is situated in between the cold East Greenland Current to the west and the warm Gulf Stream to the east of the island, and is the only landmass in the northern hemisphere where warm and cold ocean currents meet. The surrounding seas makes seasonal temperature variations very small considering the latitude of the island, with ranges from around 6 °C (43 °F) in August to −4 °C (25 °F) in March, but also makes the island extremely cloudy with little sunshine even during the continuous polar day. The deep snow cover prevents any permafrost from developing. As a result of warming, the 1991−2020 temperature normal shows a mean annual temperature 1.9 °C (3.4 °F) warmer than during 1961−1990, pushing the annual temperature above freezing.

Climate data for Jan Mayen 1991–2020 (10 m, extremes 1921–2023)
Month	Jan	Feb	Mar	Apr	May	Jun	Jul	Aug	Sep	Oct	Nov	Dec	Year
Record high °C (°F)	9.5 (49.1)	10 (50)	8.3 (46.9)	10.3 (50.5)	14.4 (57.9)	18.1 (64.6)	18 (64)	17 (63)	14.2 (57.6)	15 (59)	10 (50)	12.3 (54.1)	18.1 (64.6)
Mean daily maximum °C (°F)	−0.7 (30.7)	−1.2 (29.8)	−1.6 (29.1)	−0.2 (31.6)	2.1 (35.8)	5.1 (41.2)	7.5 (45.5)	7.9 (46.2)	6 (43)	3 (37)	0.9 (33.6)	−0.4 (31.3)	2.4 (36.2)
Daily mean °C (°F)	−2.9 (26.8)	−3.4 (25.9)	−3.7 (25.3)	−2.1 (28.2)	0.4 (32.7)	3.1 (37.6)	5.7 (42.3)	6.3 (43.3)	4.5 (40.1)	1.3 (34.3)	−1 (30)	−2.5 (27.5)	0.5 (32.8)
Mean daily minimum °C (°F)	−5.2 (22.6)	−5.5 (22.1)	−5.8 (21.6)	−3.9 (25.0)	−1 (30)	1.6 (34.9)	4.3 (39.7)	5.1 (41.2)	3.2 (37.8)	−0.3 (31.5)	−2.9 (26.8)	−4.6 (23.7)	−1.2 (29.7)
Record low °C (°F)	−26.9 (−16.4)	−28.4 (−19.1)	−26.8 (−16.2)	−21.4 (−6.5)	−12 (10)	−5.1 (22.8)	−3.2 (26.2)	−2.3 (27.9)	−5.2 (22.6)	−18 (0)	−19.5 (−3.1)	−24.2 (−11.6)	−28.4 (−19.1)
Average precipitation mm (inches)	61 (2.4)	52 (2.0)	53 (2.1)	39 (1.5)	35 (1.4)	23 (0.9)	36 (1.4)	57 (2.2)	78 (3.1)	72 (2.8)	69 (2.7)	68 (2.7)	643 (25.2)
Source 1: Norwegian Meteorological Institute
Source 2: Meteostat

Climate data for Jan Mayen (1961–1990, extremes 1921–2010)
Month	Jan	Feb	Mar	Apr	May	Jun	Jul	Aug	Sep	Oct	Nov	Dec	Year
Record high °C (°F)	9.5 (49.1)	10.0 (50.0)	8.0 (46.4)	10.3 (50.5)	11.3 (52.3)	18.1 (64.6)	15.0 (59.0)	15.7 (60.3)	13.4 (56.1)	15.0 (59.0)	10.0 (50.0)	12.3 (54.1)	18.1 (64.6)
Mean daily maximum °C (°F)	−3.0 (26.6)	−3.3 (26.1)	−3.5 (25.7)	−1.4 (29.5)	1.2 (34.2)	4.1 (39.4)	6.4 (43.5)	6.9 (44.4)	4.5 (40.1)	1.9 (35.4)	−1.0 (30.2)	−2.7 (27.1)	0.8 (33.4)
Daily mean °C (°F)	−5.7 (21.7)	−6.1 (21.0)	−6.1 (21.0)	−3.9 (25.0)	−0.7 (30.7)	2.0 (35.6)	4.2 (39.6)	4.9 (40.8)	2.8 (37.0)	0.1 (32.2)	−3.3 (26.1)	−5.2 (22.6)	−1.4 (29.5)
Mean daily minimum °C (°F)	−8.4 (16.9)	−9.0 (15.8)	−8.5 (16.7)	−6.0 (21.2)	−2.2 (28.0)	0.5 (32.9)	2.7 (36.9)	3.5 (38.3)	1.3 (34.3)	−1.7 (28.9)	−5.4 (22.3)	−7.7 (18.1)	−3.4 (25.9)
Record low °C (°F)	−26.9 (−16.4)	−28.4 (−19.1)	−26.8 (−16.2)	−21.4 (−6.5)	−12.0 (10.4)	−5.1 (22.8)	−3.2 (26.2)	−2.3 (27.9)	−5.2 (22.6)	−18.0 (−0.4)	−19.5 (−3.1)	−24.2 (−11.6)	−28.4 (−19.1)
Average precipitation mm (inches)	56 (2.2)	53 (2.1)	55 (2.2)	40 (1.6)	40 (1.6)	37 (1.5)	47 (1.9)	61 (2.4)	82 (3.2)	82 (3.2)	65 (2.6)	65 (2.6)	683 (27.1)
Average precipitation days (≥ 1 mm)	12.6	11.1	12.1	9.1	7.6	7.6	9.2	11.1	13.3	14.6	12.9	13.0	134.2
Average relative humidity (%)	83	83	84	83	85	87	89	87	83	83	81	82	84
Mean monthly sunshine hours	0	28	62	120	149	150	124	93	60	31	0	0	817
Source 1: Norwegian Meteorological Institute
Source 2: The Weather Network (humidity), World Climate data (sunshine hours)

== In popular culture ==
The 2022 film Tales of Jan Mayen, directed by Hugo Pettit, documents the recreation of the 1921 British expedition to the summit of Mount Beerenberg.

== See also ==
- List of islands of Norway
- List of islands of Norway by area
- Svalbard
- Svalbard and Jan Mayen

== General and cited references ==
- Ledgard, J. M. (2011). Submergence. Coffee House Press.
- Umbreit, Andreas (2005). Spitsbergen: Svalbard – Franz Josef Land – Jan Mayen, 3rd ed. Chalfont St. Peter: Bradt Travel Guides. ISBN 1-84162-092-0.
