= Rudolftoppen =

Mountain in Norway

Coordinates: 70.8915°N 8.8702°W

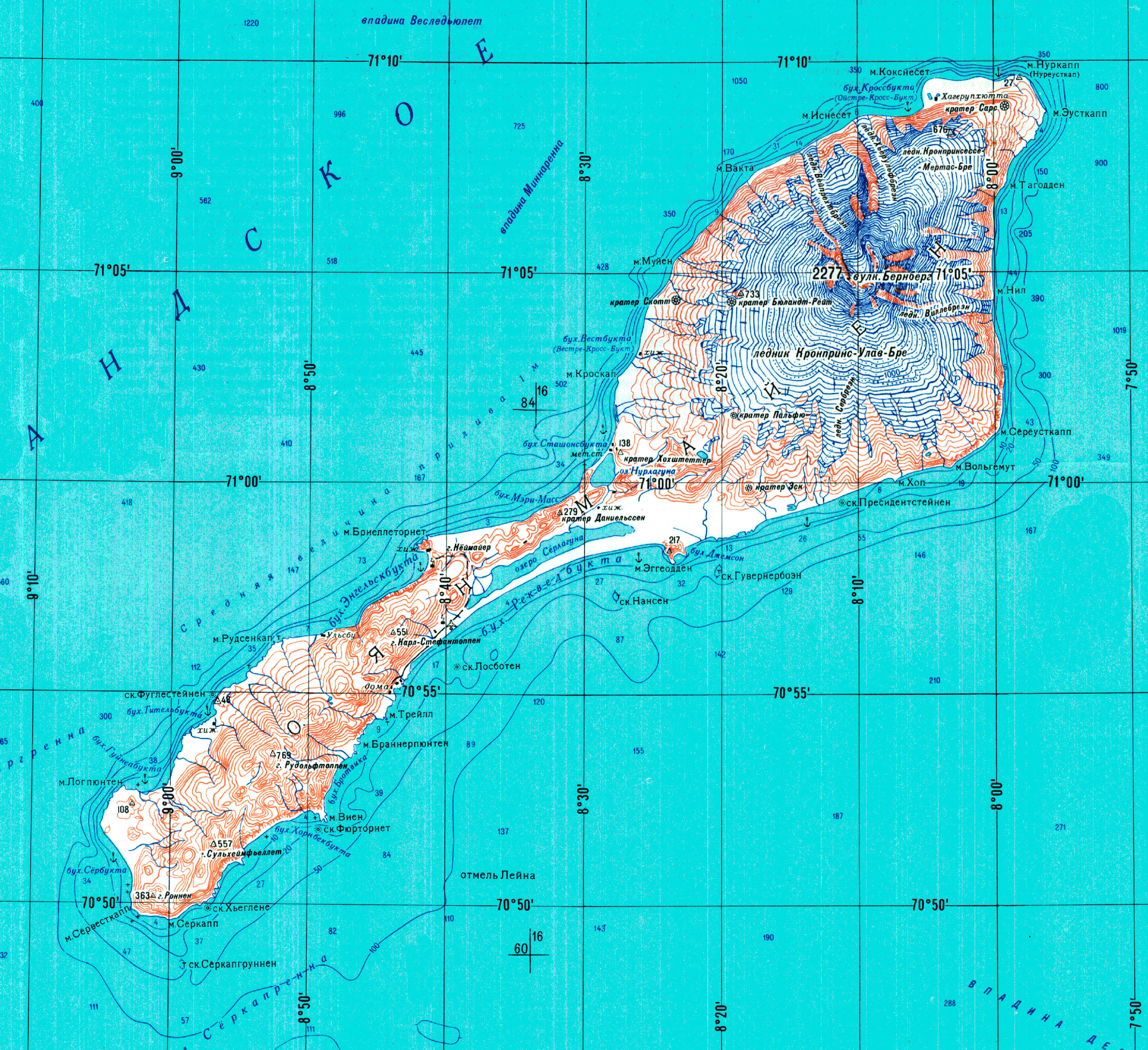
Topographic map of Jan Mayen

Rudolftoppen is a mountain on the island of Jan Mayen. It has a height of 769 m.a.s.l., and is the highest peak in the southern part of the island. It is named after Crown Prince Rudolf of Austria.
