= Whaling in the Netherlands =

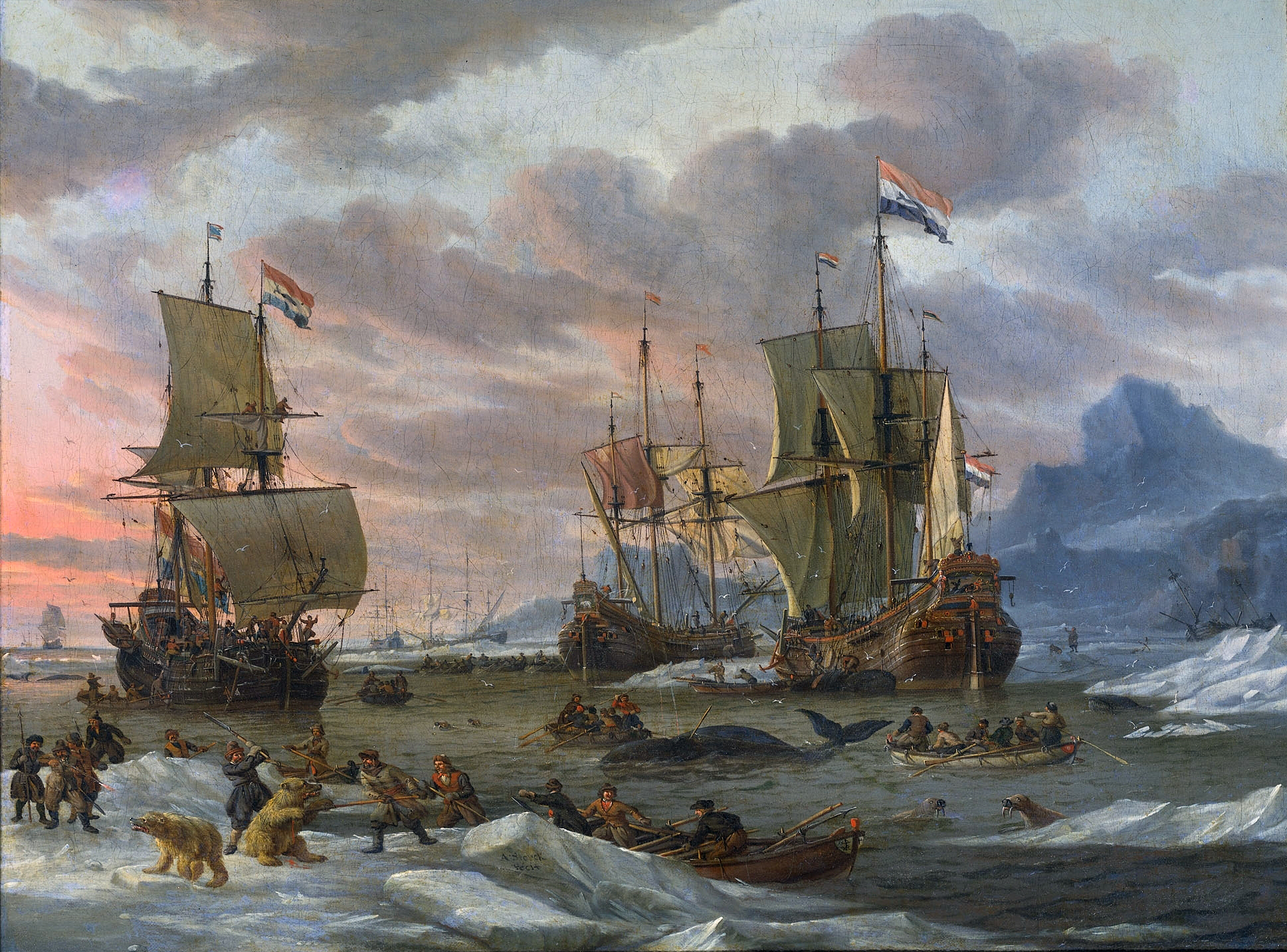
This late-17th-century Dutch whaling scene, Walvisvangst, was captured by a contemporary artist, Abraham Storck. The painting is in the collection of the Rijksmuseum in Amsterdam.

The history of Dutch whaling begins with 17th-century exploration of Arctic fishing grounds; and the profitability of whaling in the 18th century drove further growth. Increased competition and political upheavals in Europe affected the stability of this maritime industry in the 19th century; and a combination of these factors cut short any further growth of Dutch whaling in the Antarctic.

Modern, post-war whaling in the Southern Ocean was developed intensely, but continued growth of Dutch whaling was abbreviated as a result of multi-national treaties which similarly impacted other national whaling enterprises.

The current government of the Netherlands supports a moratorium on all whaling worldwide.

== History ==
Barentsz' map published in 1598

The beginnings of Dutch whaling are indirectly attributed to Willem Barentsz (anglicized as William Barents or Barentz) (1550–1597), who was a Dutch navigator and explorer, a leader of early expeditions to the far north. On his last voyage, Barentsz accompanied Jacob van Heemskerck as pilot, and Gerrit de Veer, the historian of the voyage, was on board as first mate. This expedition's discovery of the Arctic archipelago of Spitsbergen (now known as Svalbard) was to become the foundation for lucrative Dutch claims to the whaling grounds in and around the islands. In the fierce competition for the best whaling grounds, the Dutch construed that other nations had less right to hunt whales in waters which had been "discovered" by Dutch explorers.

The development of Dutch whaling and sealing saw changes in the composition of crews, in shipbuilding technology, in governmental involvement and in the profitability of the industries.

=== 17th century ===
The numbers of whaling ships outfitted in the Netherlands grew rapidly—more than doubling in a decade to 70 ships in 1654, and more than doubling again to 148 ships in 1670. The ships involved in whaling helped to make the Dutch Republic one of the richest nations of the 17th century, but this resource was ruthlessly exploited; and by the mid-17th century the catches decreased as the favoured whales became rare.

Whaling in the waters around Spitsbergen shifted after 1670 because of a modification of the whales migratory patterns. Some have attributed this change to a global warming trend which permitted the whales to return to their normal summer grounds off the northeast coast of Greenland, but it could have been simply that whales who had survived aggressive whale hunting in earlier seasons were simply avoiding the whalers.

In 1684, 246 Dutch whalers captured 1,185 whales in the waters off Spitsbergen. Typically, whaling expeditions hunted the Bowhead whale, which is a slow-moving unhurried creature which yields plenty of oil. Their high percentage of body fat also meant that they floated when dead and, therefore, were easy to tow back to the land.

=== 18th century ===
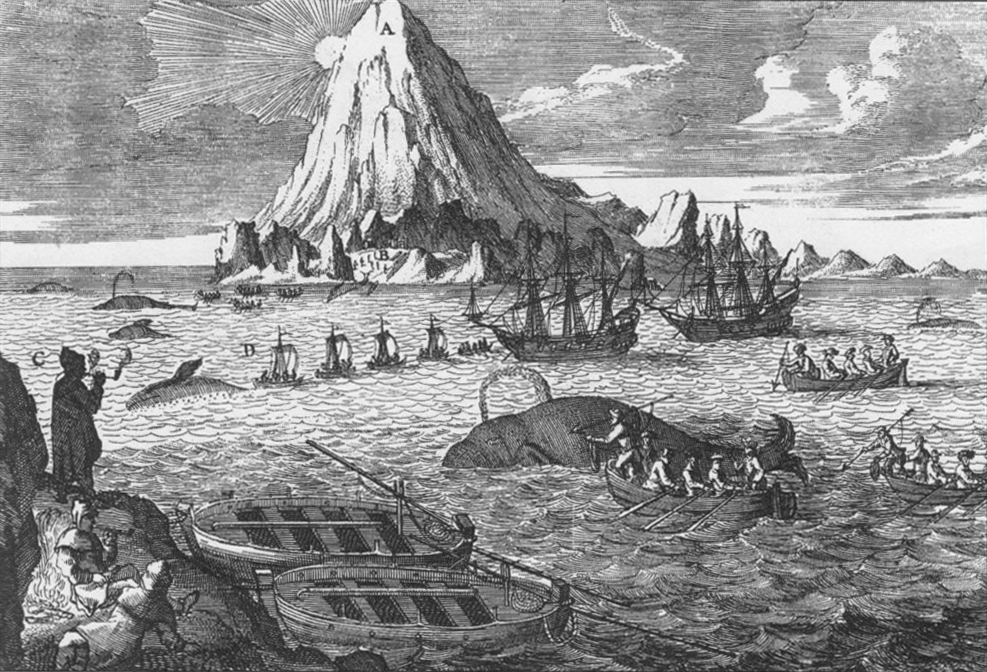
18th-century engraving showing Dutch whalers hunting bowhead whales in the Arctic

During the 17th and 18th century the people from the Frisian Wadden Sea islands of the Netherlands and Germany were very active in the whaling. During the heydays of the Dutch Republic about fifty to sixty percent of the whaling personnel was of Frisian origin, either Frisians from the Netherlands or Germany. From the second half of the 18th century onward especially, the people of the North Frisian Islands enjoyed a reputation of being very skilled mariners, and most Dutch whaling ships bound for Greenland and Svalbard would have a crew of North Frisian islanders. Especially Föhr island has been recorded as a stronghold of whaling personnel. At the height of Dutch whaling in the year 1762, 1,186 seamen from Föhr were serving on Dutch whaling vessels alone and 25% of all shipmasters on Dutch whaling vessels were people from Föhr.

Dutch supremacy in whaling over other European competitors like France, Germany and Britain diminished in the second half of the 18th century.

=== 19th century ===
Amongst the political and economic consequences of the Treaty of Amiens was that control of the Cape of Good Hope was wrested from the British and restored to the Netherlands. This reanimated the prospects for profitable Dutch whaling in the antipodes. In the wake of the British and the Americans, the Dutch made attempts to organize whaling in the South Seas, including the Afrikaanse Visscheriji Societeit (the African Fishery Society) which was founded in Amsterdam in 1802.

A significant system of subsidies issued by the King and his ministers supported Dutch entrepreneurs, which minimized a competitive disadvantage in a period of international whaling with similar financial incentives being funded by many national governments. In this context, a lack of quality in the art of shipbuilding and in the training of seamen has been regarded as very important factors in explaining the ultimate failure of the Dutch whaling industry in the late 19th century.

== Dutch culture ==
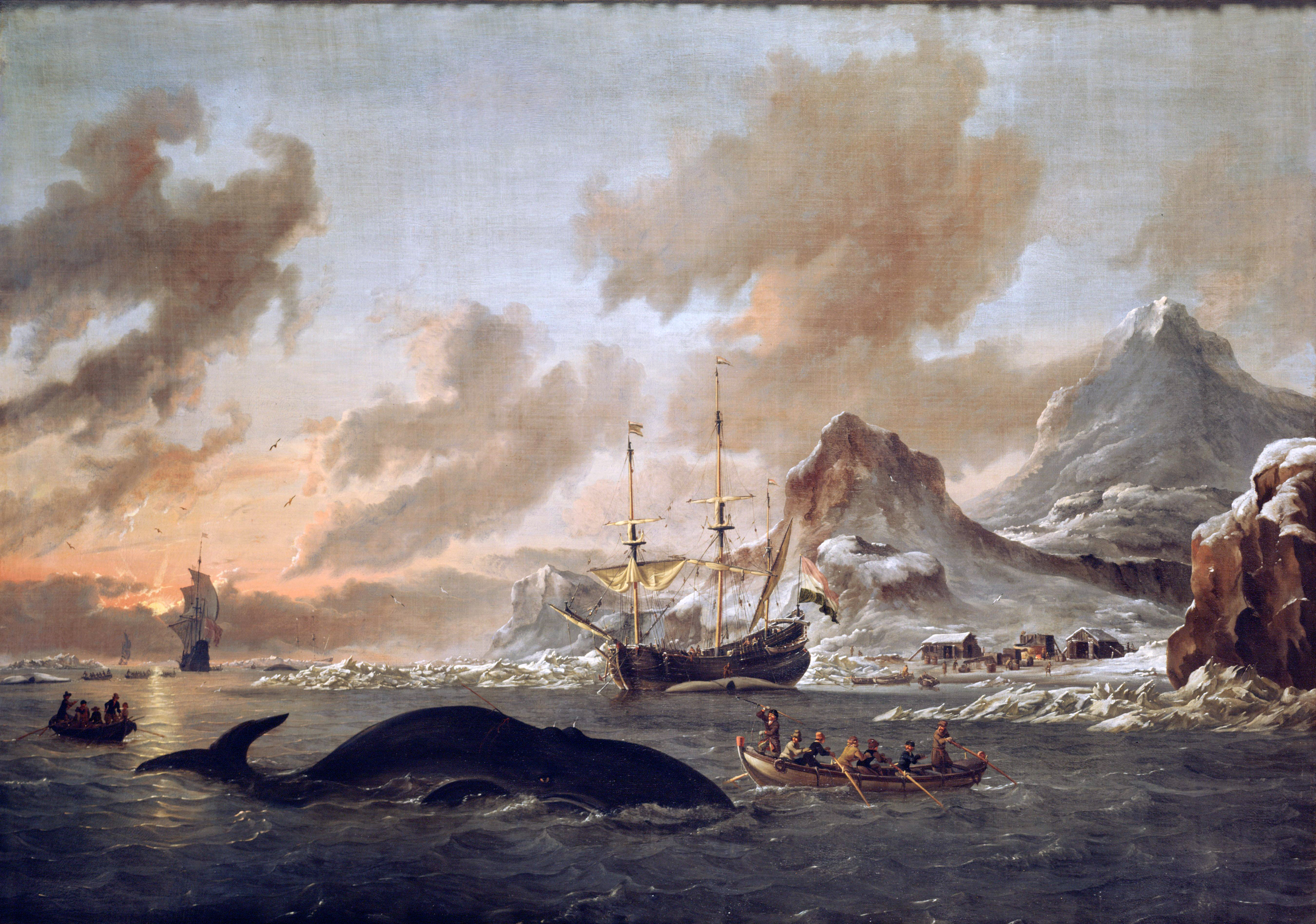
Dutch whalers near Spitsbergen. Abraham Storck, 1690

Dutch and Flemish maritime paintings of the 16th and 17th centuries mirror the emergence of the Dutch Republic as a great maritime power and the rise of the seascape as a distinct art form in the Low Countries. The works of this period included vessels sailing, trading, fighting, fishing and whaling; and each individually and collectively display aspects of an evolving Dutch culture. The artists' depictions of whaling expeditions help to establish the economic importance of whaling to the Dutch during the late 17th century. and its "Golden Age."

In remarks at the opening of an exhibit of paintings which, in part, focus on Dutch whaling, the Dutch Ambassador to the Court of St. James suggests a relevant broader perspective:

"The revolt against the most Catholic Spanish overlords and the subsequent menacing of the small rebel Dutch republic by virtually all great powers of Europe made them realise that their struggle for survival could only by won by the fierce protection of the freedom of the Netherlands’ single natural resource .... We learned to harness the sea; however, like a horse, the sea can never be conquered. Our national identity can be easily traced back to the whims of the water.... It is the Dutch and Flemish masters of the 16th and 17th centuries who have indeed come close to conquering the sea by fixing its capriciousness on panel and canvas."

The economic success of the Dutch Republic was inextricably linked with the sea as were the emerging national identity and international reputation of the young state. Many in the Netherlands earned their fortune in Arctic whaling; however the success of whaling scenes in Netherlandish painting cannot be entirely explained by economic interest.

Dutch culture and language were also exported by whalers from abroad who hired on Dutch vessels. E.g. the North Frisian dialect Fering adopted a number of popular Dutch and West Frisian personal name forms, and many loanwords from the Dutch language to Fering are still in use today. It has been observed that apart from Afrikaans, no other language outside the Netherlands proper has been influenced as much by the Dutch language as the North Frisian insular dialects.

== Modern whaling ==
During the two decades after the end of World War II, the Netherlands aggressively pursued whaling in the Antarctic, operating two factory ships and maintaining one at a time. In 1964, the long history of Dutch whaling came to a conclusive end when the country's last factory ship, poetically named Willem Barendsz (II), was temporarily sold to Japanese whaling interests along with whaling rights. It returned to Dutch ownership in summer 1965 and was subsequently sold to the South African Silverman-Group, departing in February 1966. It was later sold to a Korean operator and renamed.

The current Dutch government opposes the practice of whaling, and the Netherlands is committed to seeing new and improved binding agreements made within the International Whaling Commission.

== See also ==
- Seal hunting
- Whaling in the United Kingdom
