= Somna =

Somna or Sømna may refer to:

== Places ==
- Sømna Municipality, a municipality in Nordland county, Norway
- Sømna Church, a church in Sømna Municipality in Nordland county, Norway
- Somna State, a princely state of British India
