= August Nielsen =

Norwegian architect (1877–1956)

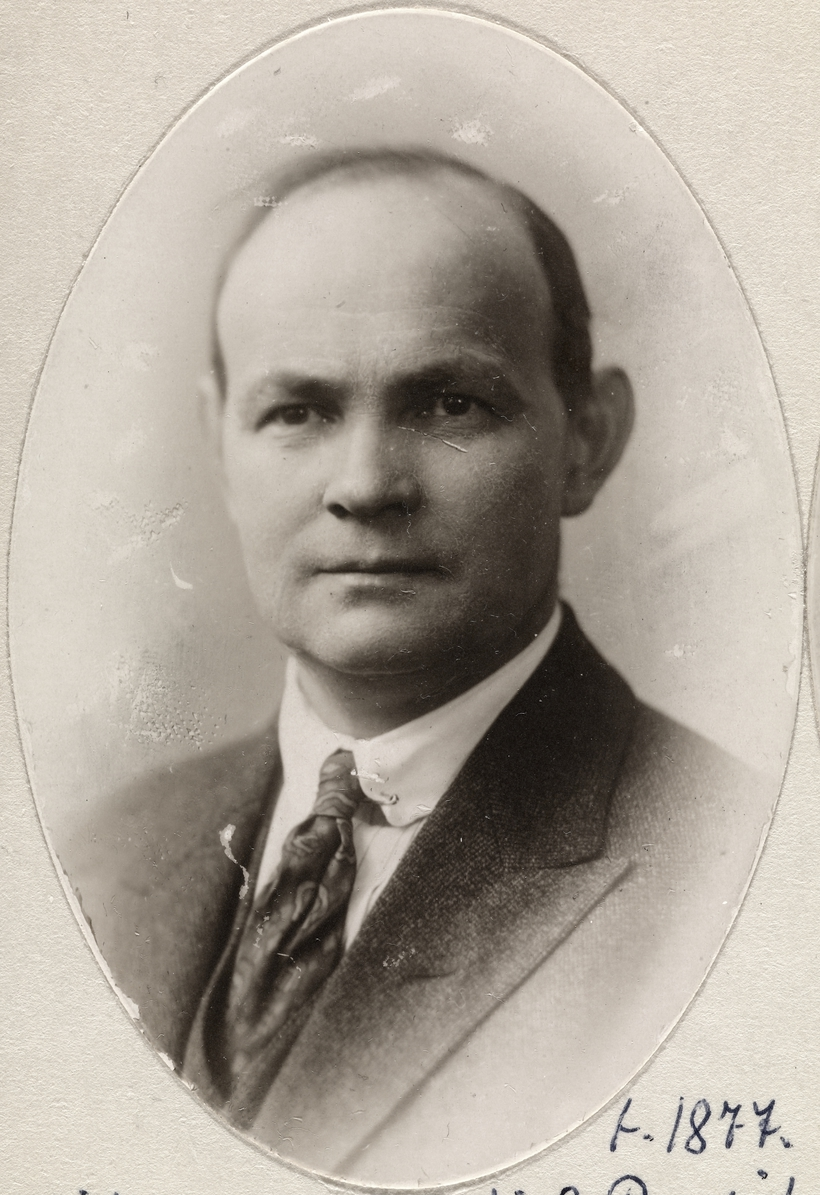
August Nielsen

August Bendix Christofer Nielsen (7 May 1877 – 21 February 1956) was a Norwegian architect.

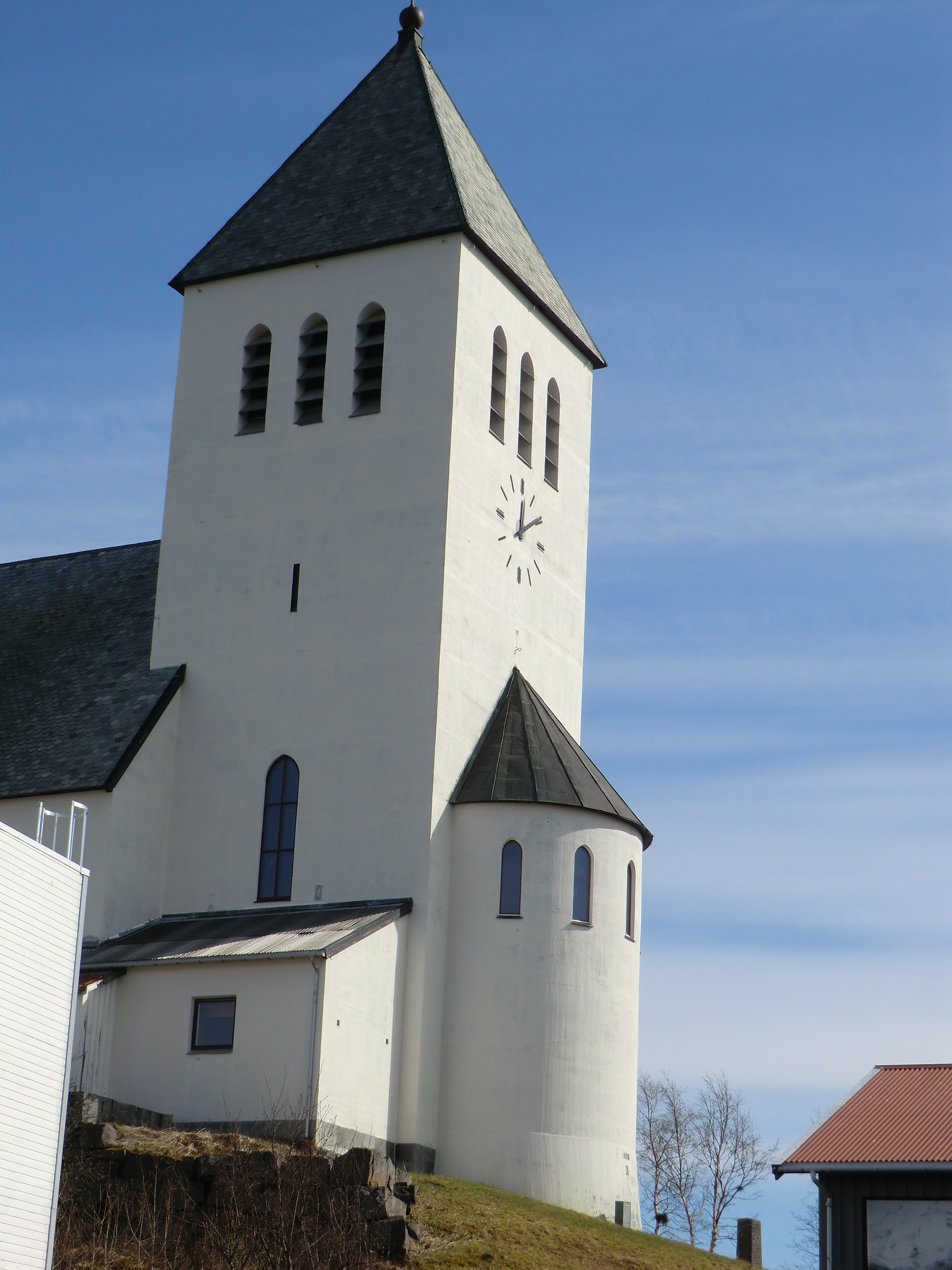
Svolvær Church

August Nielsen was born in the village of Vik in Sømna Municipality in Nordland, Norway. He was a son of politician Sivert Nielsen (1823–1904) and Jonethe Cornelia Falck Heide (1833–1927). He received the name Bendix from his maternal grandfather. In 1910 he married physician's daughter Ella Hassel, who was a sister of Odd Hassel.

Nielsen attended Trondheim Technical College (now Norwegian University of Science and Technology) from 1893 to 1897, and spent the next years as an assistant of architects including Bredo Greve as well as Andreas Bugge, Heinrich Jürgensen and Ingvar Hjorth. During 1903, he conducted study trip to Scotland, England and France. He started his own architect's firm at Kristiania (now Oslo) in 1911. He is most associated with the Deichman Library at Schous plass and the entrance portal at Frogner stadion (both 1914).

He contributed with Rudolf Emanuel Jacobsen in creating several buildings at Frogner station's 1914 Jubilee Exhibition; buildings that were moved later. He also designed villas in Trosterudveien 9 and 7 (both in 1911), Holmenkollveien 61c (1915) and Gråkamveien 17 (1922).

From 1918 he partnered with architect Harald Sund. Among their works were Majorstuen Church, Fredrikstad Library (both finished in 1926) and the diocesan seat in Tromsø (1924). From 1920 to 1947 Nielsen was the director of regulation in Aker Municipality. He was also a member of the municipal council of Aker Municipality from 1919 to 1922. He also led the work of regulating the city of Narvik.

He was decorated with the King's Medal of Merit in gold. He died at Oslo during 1956 and was buried at Vestre gravlund.

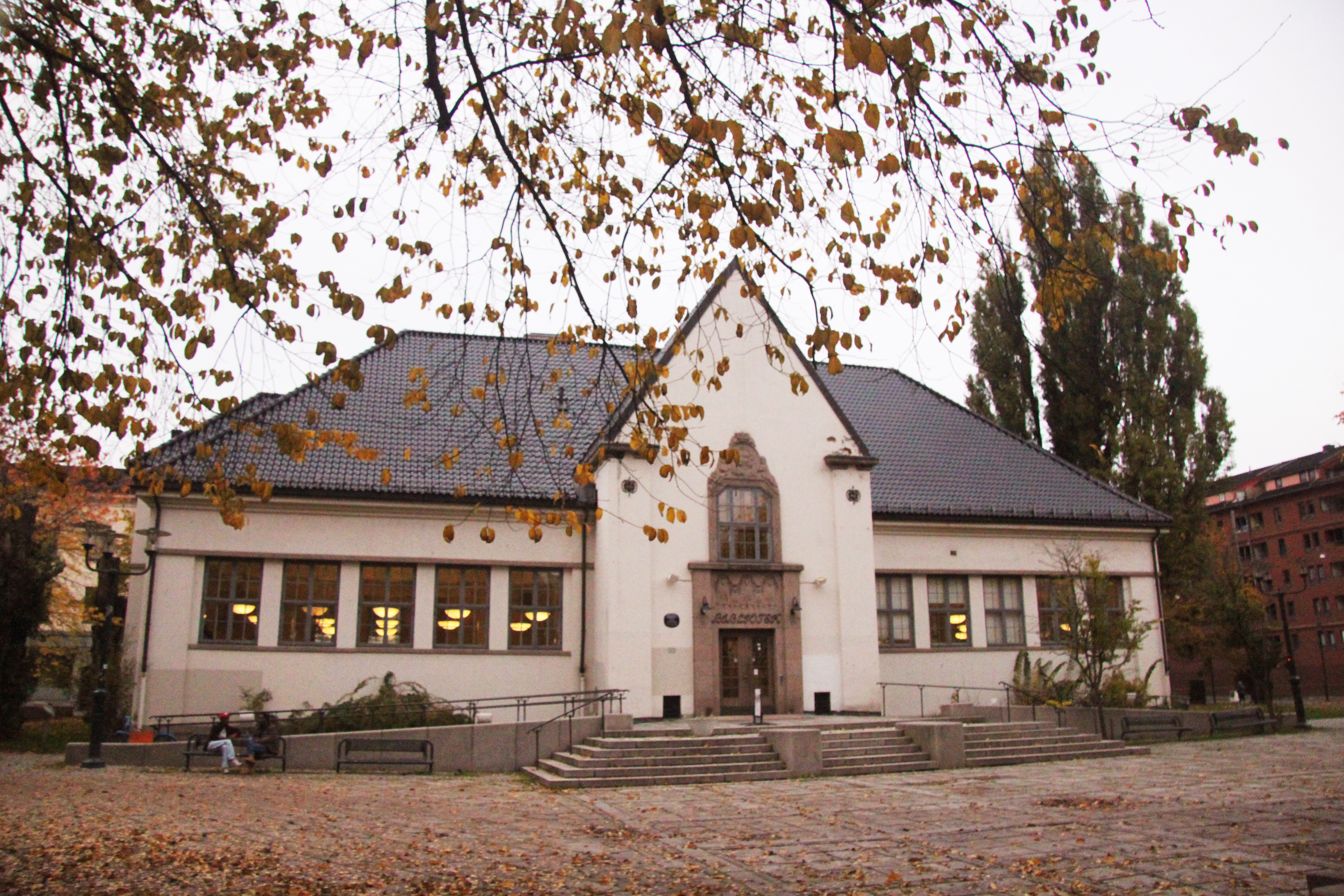
Deichmanske Library

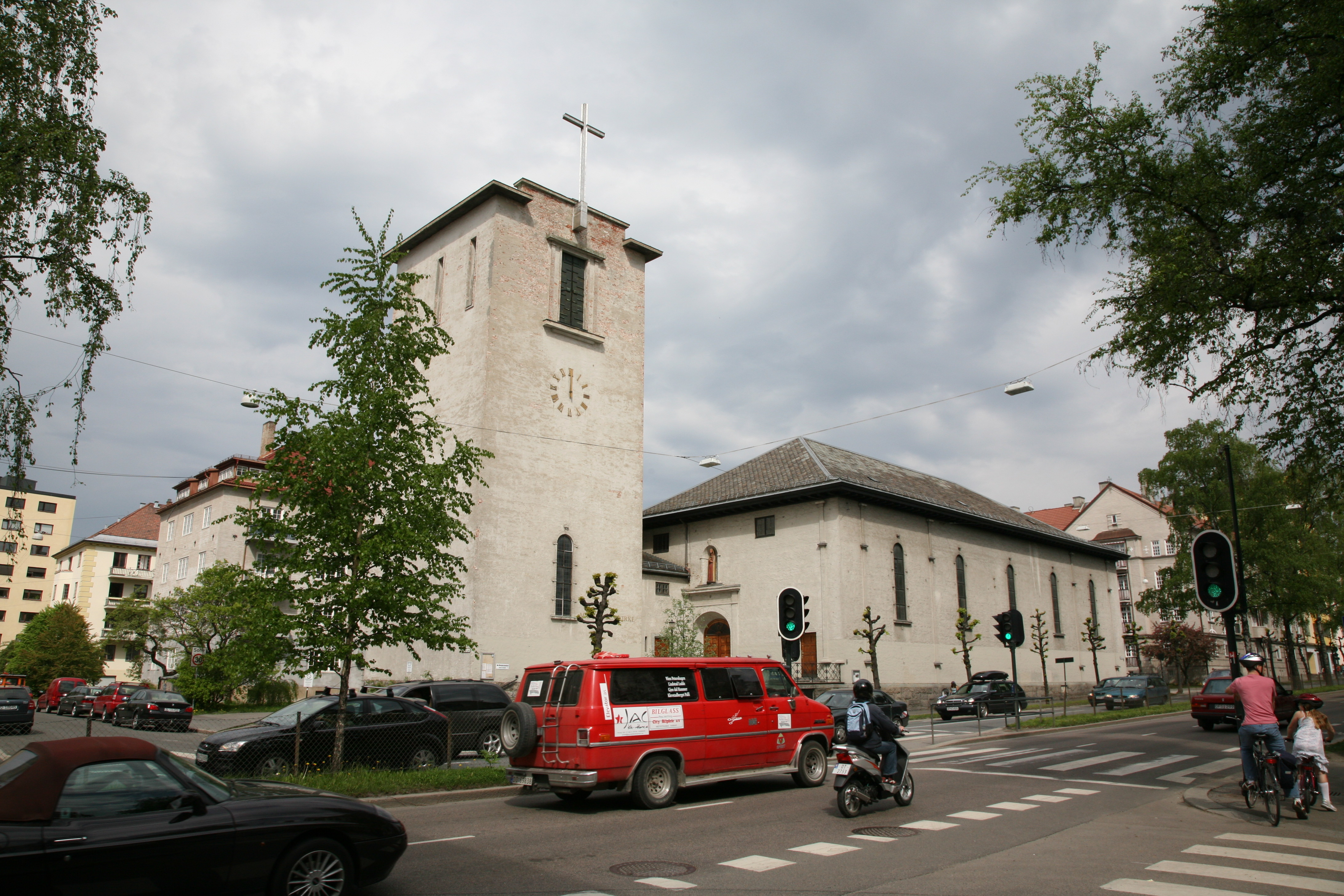
Majorstuen Church

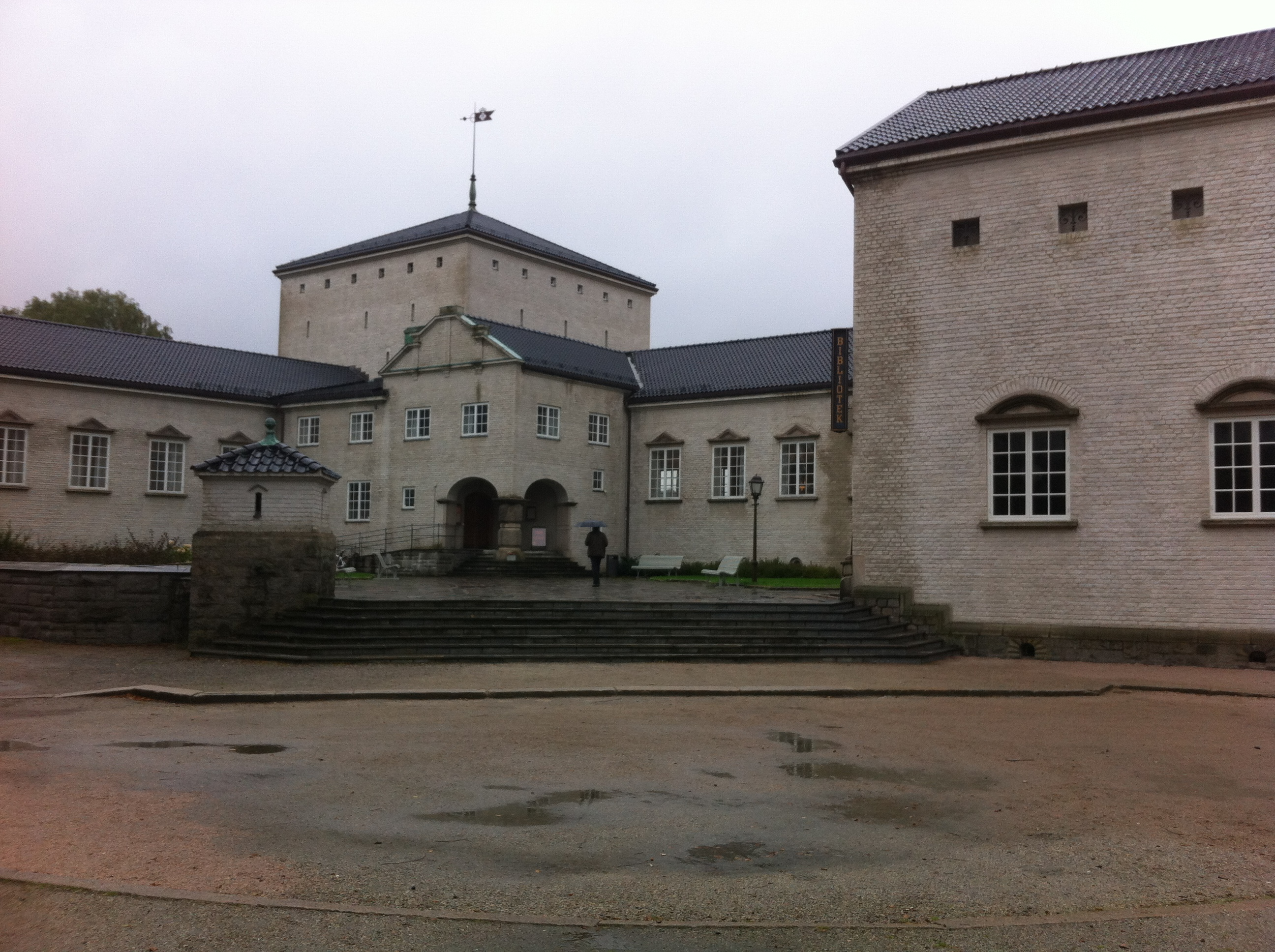
Fredrikstad Library

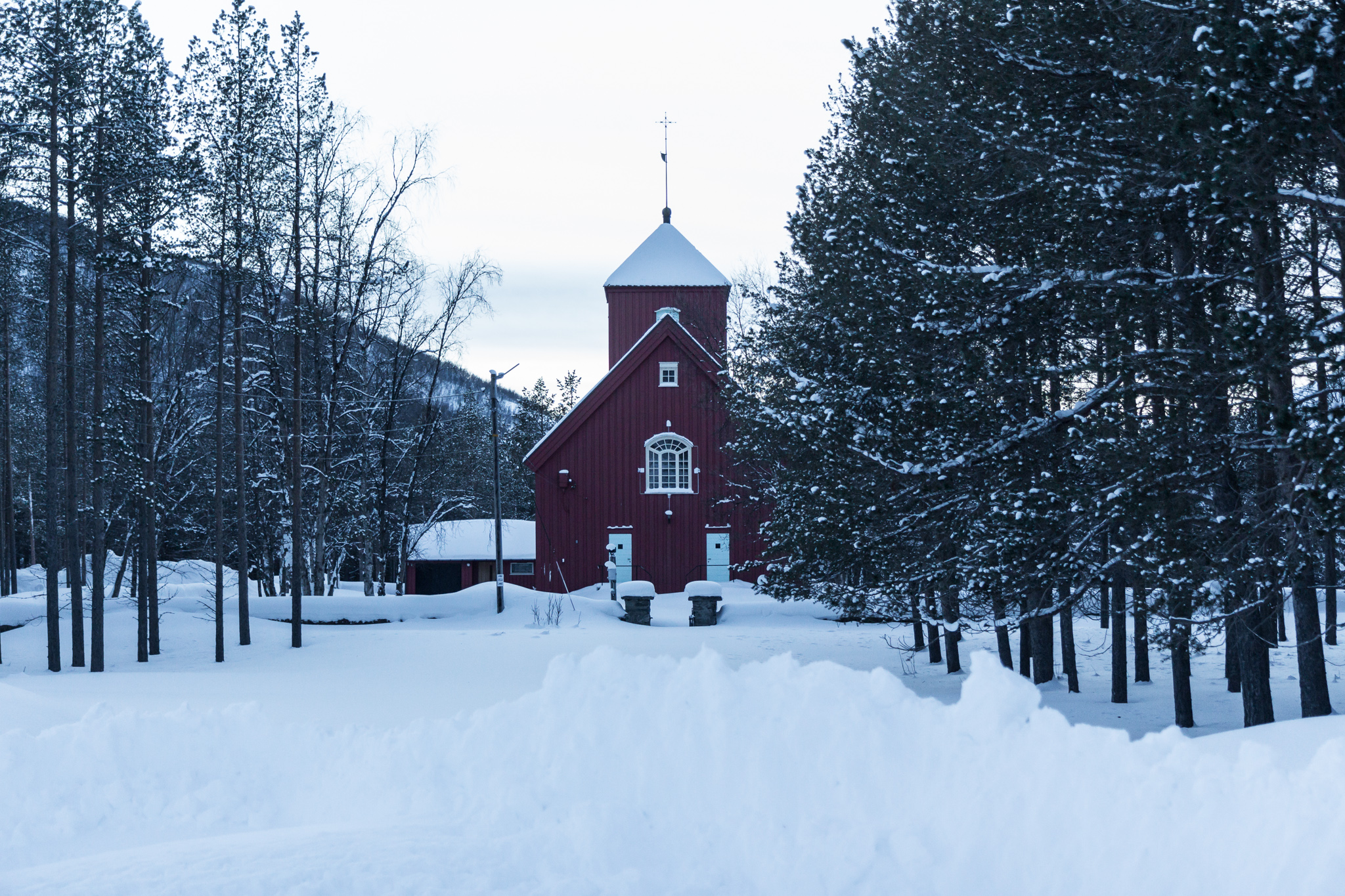
Rotsund Chapel

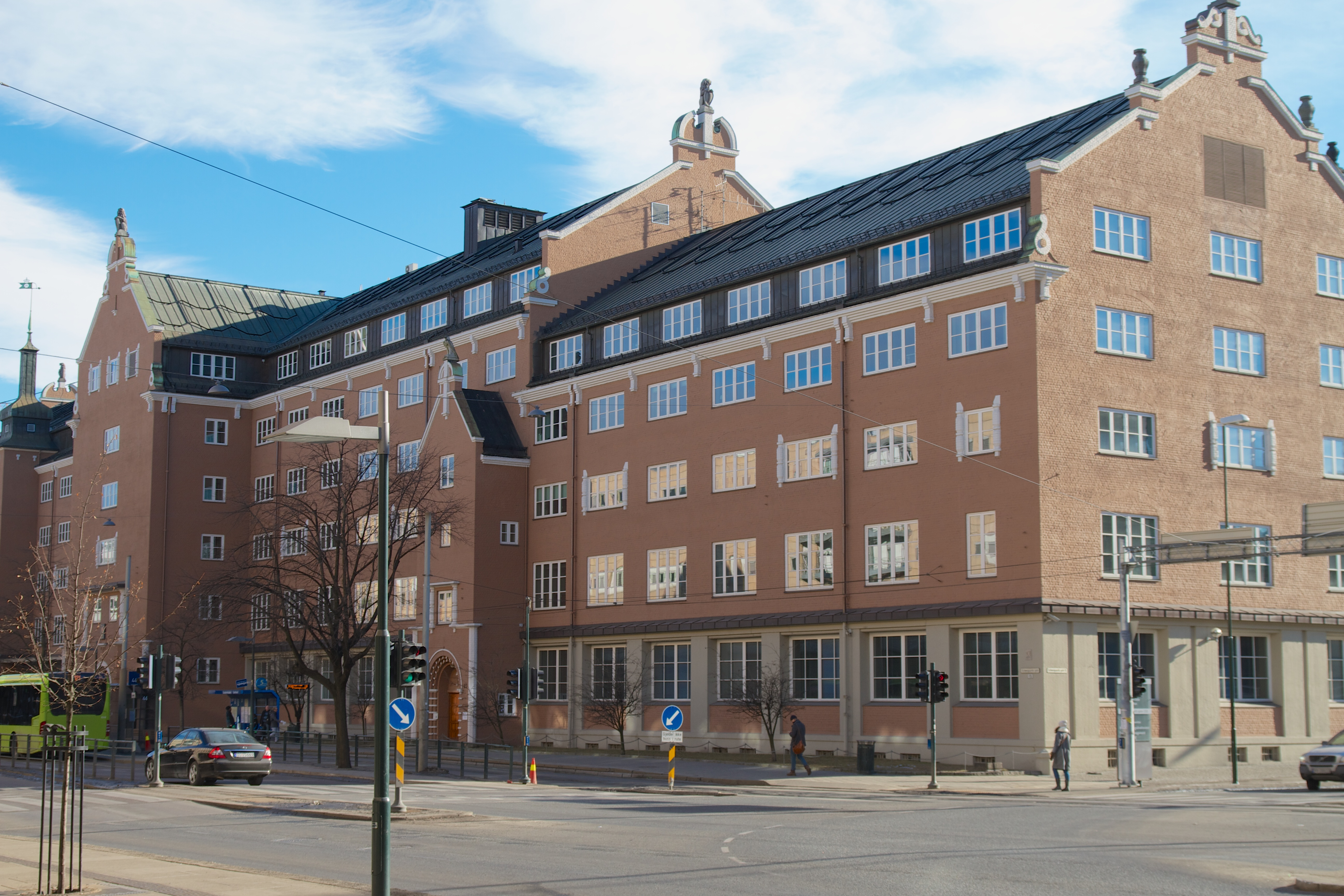
Oslo Railway Station
