= Ranes Church =

Church in Møre og Romsdal, Norway

- Ranes kyrkje
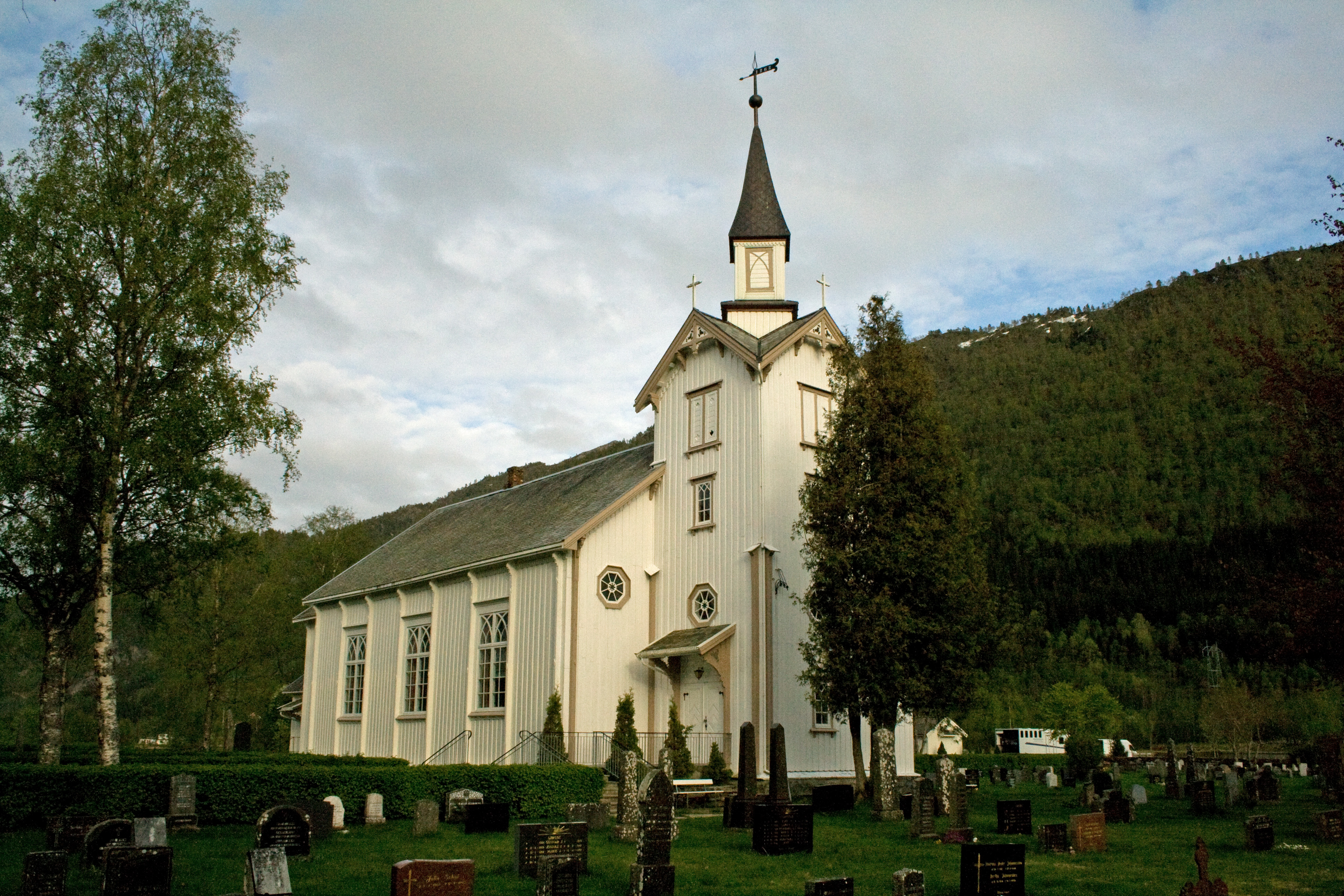
- View of the church
- Ranes Church
- 62°58′34″N 8°46′19″E
- Location: Surnadal Municipality, Møre og Romsdal
- Country: Norway
- Denomination: Church of Norway
- Churchmanship: Evangelical Lutheran

History
- Status: Parish church
- Founded: 12th century
- Consecrated: 29 December 1869

Architecture
- Functional status: Active
- Architect: Schmedling
- Architectural type: Long church
- Completed: 1869 (157 years ago)

Specifications
- Capacity: 420
- Materials: Wood

Administration
- Diocese: Møre bispedømme
- Deanery: Indre Nordmøre prosti
- Parish: Øye og Ranes
- Norwegian Cultural Heritage Site
- Type: Church
- Status: Not protected
- ID: 85273

Ranes Church (Norwegian: Ranes kyrkje) is a parish church of the Church of Norway in Surnadal Municipality in Møre og Romsdal county, Norway. It is located in the village of Ranes, just east of the municipal centre of Skei. It is one of the two churches for the Øye og Ranes parish which is part of the Indre Nordmøre prosti (deanery) in the Diocese of Møre. The white, wooden church was built in a long church style in 1869 using plans drawn up by the architect Schmedling from the town of Molde. The church seats about 420 people.

== History ==
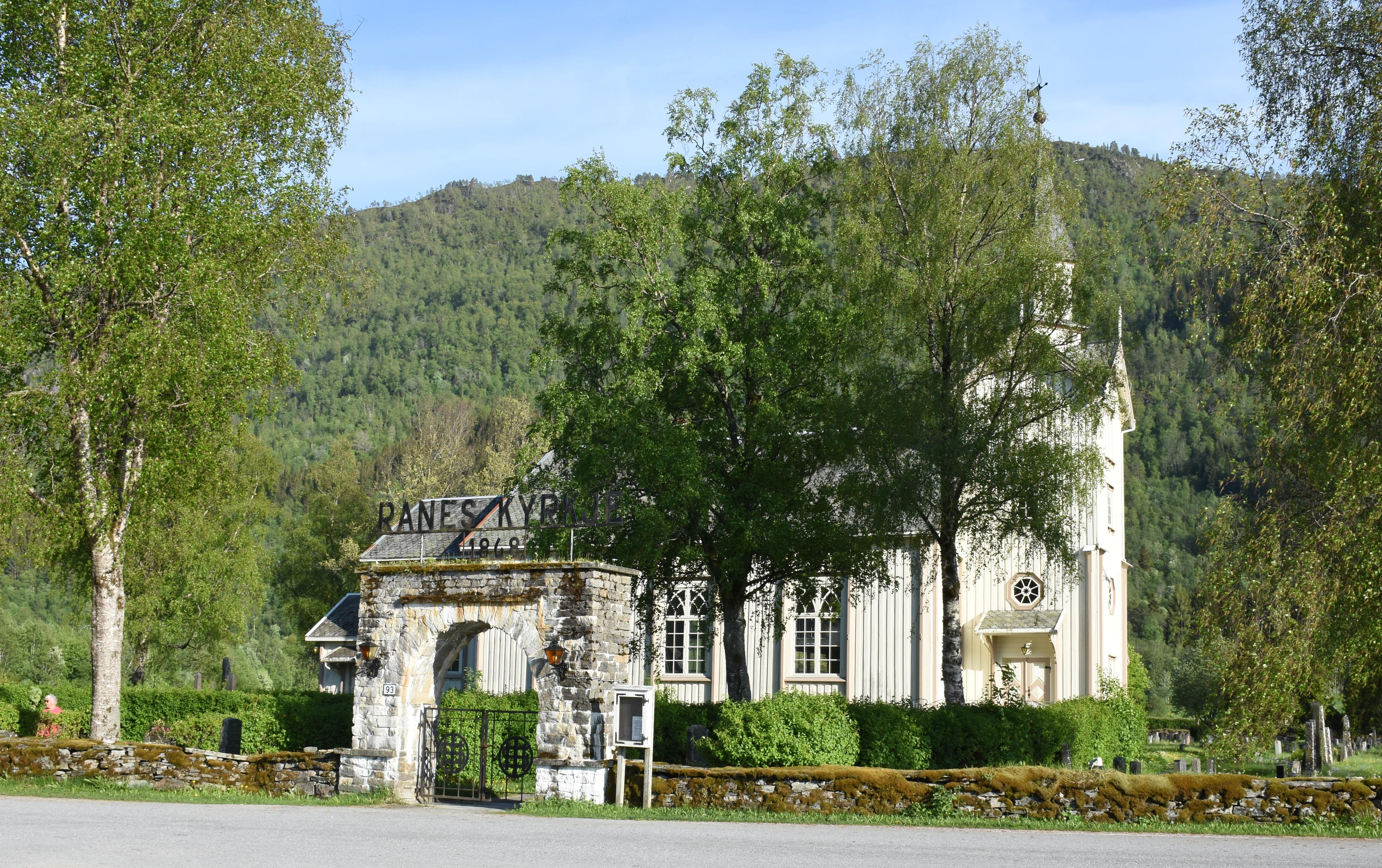
View of the church

The earliest existing historical records of the church date back to 1589, but that was not when the church was built. During the 1500s, the church contained artifacts dating back to the 1100s and 1200s, so the church was likely built in the 12th century. The first church here was actually located at Skei, about 1.5 kilometres (0.93 mi) west of the present church site. The church was located quite close to the river Surna and due to the soil conditions, and shifting river bed over time, the churchyard would occasionally flood, and worse yet, the river would wash away parts of the graveyard, exposing coffins. At some point during the 1600s, the church was disassembled, moved, and rebuilt about 1.5 kilometres (0.93 mi) to the east to Ranes. After the move, the church yard was gradually swallowed up by the shifting river. This old stave church existed at Ranes until around 1702 when it was torn down. In 1702, a new church on the same site was completed. The new church was a large, timber-framed building with a cruciform floor plan, a tower on the roof, a sacristy in the east and a church porch in the west. That church was painted red and had a tile roof.

In 1814, this church served as an election church (Norwegian: valgkirke). Together with more than 300 other parish churches across Norway, it was a polling station for elections to the 1814 Norwegian Constituent Assembly which wrote the Constitution of Norway. This was Norway's first national elections. Each church parish was a constituency that elected people called "electors" who later met together in each county to elect the representatives for the assembly that was to meet at Eidsvoll Manor later that year.

By the late-1860s, the old church was in poor condition and it was decided that rather than repair the church, they would replace it with a new building on the same site. In 1869, the old church was torn down and a new church was built. The new building was consecrated on 15 December 1869. The new building was designed by the Molde architect Schmedling and it was built by lead builder Ole Scheistrøen. It was a wooden long church. The altarpiece from the 1702 church was stored in the attic of the new church until a renovation in 1935 when the old altarpiece was moved to the choir and reused.

== See also ==
- List of churches in Møre
