= Rudolf Emanuel Jacobsen =

Norwegian architect (1879–1937)

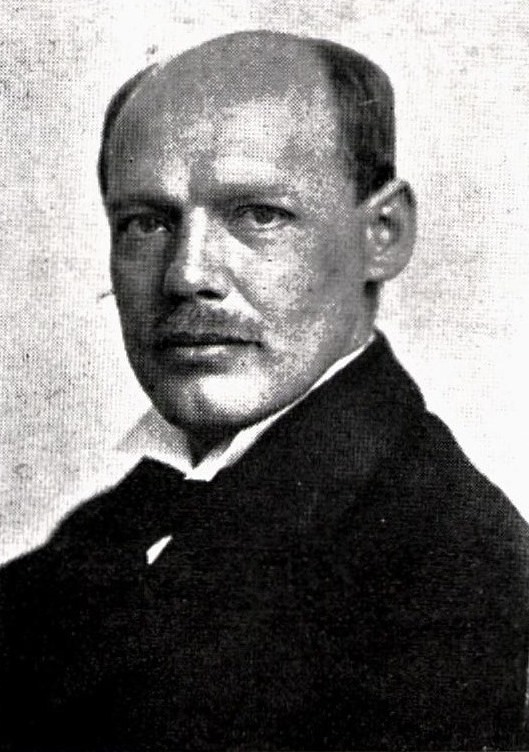
- Born: 27 October 1879; Christiania, Norway
- Died: 1937 (aged 57–58)
- Occupation: architect

Rudolf Emanuel Jacobsen (27 October 1879 – 1937) was a Norwegian architect.

Jacobsen was born in Christiania (now Oslo), Norway. He was a student at the Arts and Crafts School (Kunst- og håndverksskolen), now Norwegian National Academy of Craft and Art Industry (Statens håndverks- og kunstindustriskole). He served as an assistant architect with Bredo Greve and Ingvar Hjorth. He completed his education at the Royal Institute of Technology in Stockholm from 1904 to 1907.

Jacobsen was among the architects who contributed to the 1914 Jubilee Exhibition at Frogner Park in 1914, where he co-designed (with August Nielsen) the main restaurant (Folkerestauranten), Agricultural Building (Landbruksbygningen) and Forestry Building (Skogbruksbygningen).

Among Jacobsen's other works were Bytårnet in Moss, Doblouggården and Oslo hovedpostkontor.

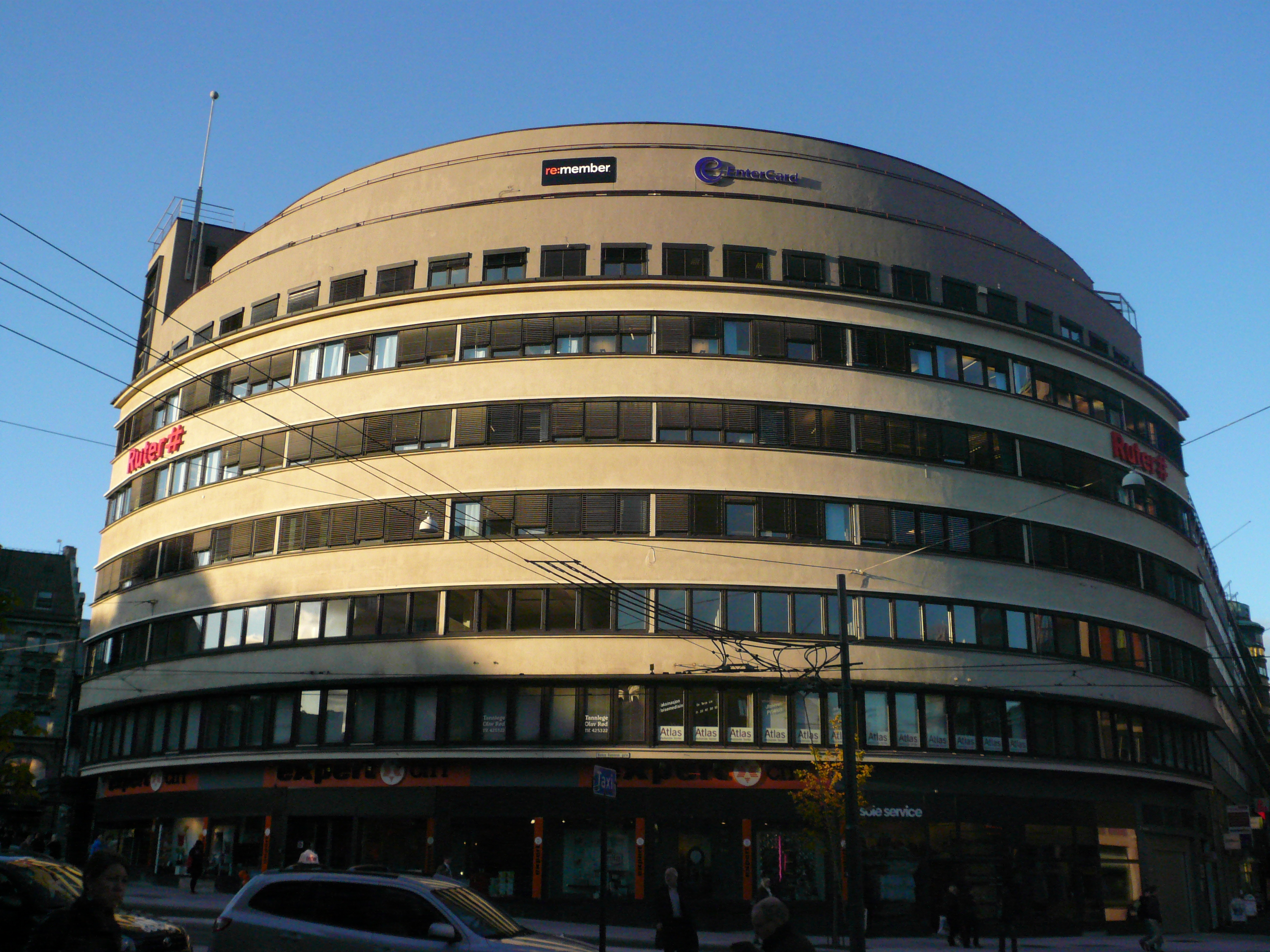
Doblouggården from 1933 (Designed by Jacobsen and Erich Mendelsohn).
