= Ole Scheistrøen =

Norwegian architect and builder

Ole Olsen Scheistrøen
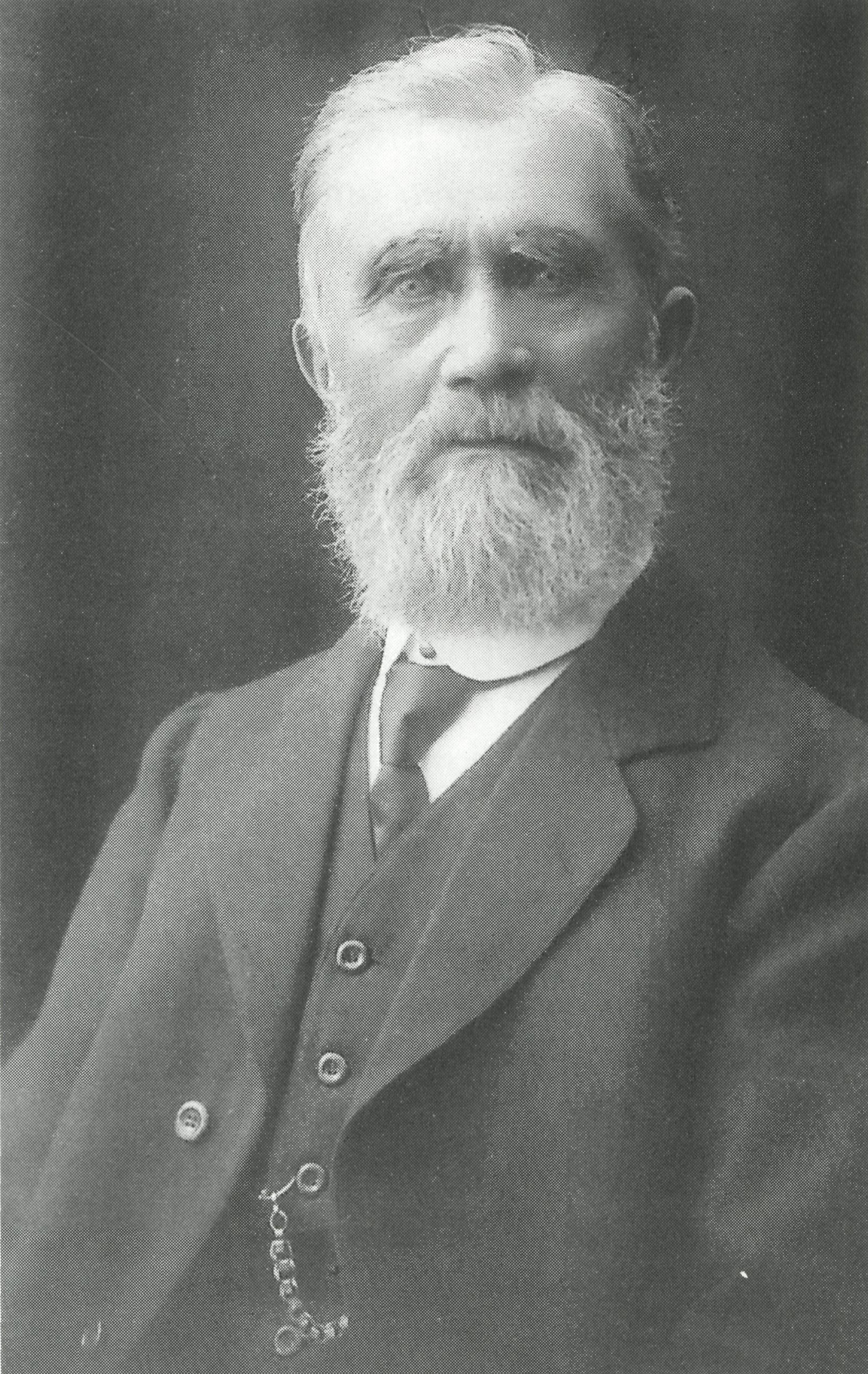
- Born: 16 August 1833; Skei, Norway
- Died: 4 February 1921 (aged 87); Namsos, Norway
- Occupation: Architect
- Spouse: Maria Jakobsdatter Otnes
- Parent(s): Ole Olsen Scheistrøen and Rannei Pedersdatter Øyan

Ole Olsen Scheistrøen (16 August 1833 – 4 February 1921) was a Norwegian architect and builder. Scheistrøen had no formal architectural education and he, in fact, referred to himself as a builder and not an architect. However, he designed about 50 Norwegian churches, in addition to designing twelve churches after drawings by other architects, including six by Jacob Wilhelm Nordan.

== Biography ==
Ole Olsen Scheistrøen was born on 16 August 1833 in the village of Skei (historically spelled Schei) in what is now Surnadal Municipality in Møre og Romsdal county, Norway. He was born to Ole Olsen Scheistrøen and Rannei Pedersdatter Øyan. In 1864, he married Maria Jakobsdatter Otnes. He died in the town of Namsos on 4 February 1921.

== Career ==
Scheistrøen learned the trade from his father, a farmer and a carpenter; working together with him until around 1863. Then he worked as an independent builder.

In 1851, the Storting adopted a new law on the expansion of churches and cemeteries. A requirement in the law was that all churches should accommodate at least 30% of the members in the parish. This requirement prompted many existing churches to be rebuilt, expanded, or replaced by new ones. This new law gave architects and construction managers a lot of new work for decades to come. From 1863 until 1874, Scheistrøen built four churches in Nordmøre, three of which followed drawings by the famous architect Jacob Wilhelm Nordan.

In 1874, the Scheistrøen made original drawings for the new Sømna Church in Helgeland. This was the first church he designed himself. It was a simple timber church with decorative details in Neo-Gothic and Swiss chalet style, strongly inspired by Nordan's architecture. Several of the churches that Scheistrøen later designed were similar with slight variations to the Nordan buildings he had worked on Nordmøre when he first started out as an architect.

In 1884, Scheistrøen and his wife moved from Surnadal to Namsos. The churches he designed and built in Trøndelag and Northern Norway after moving, were built using a similar design to what he used for the Sømna Church.

Scheistrøen participated in the rebuilding of the town of Namsos after the fire of 1897, but most of his work there was lost during the bombing of Namsos in 1940.
