= Dag Skogheim =

Norwegian teacher, poet and writer of fiction and non-fiction (1928–2015)

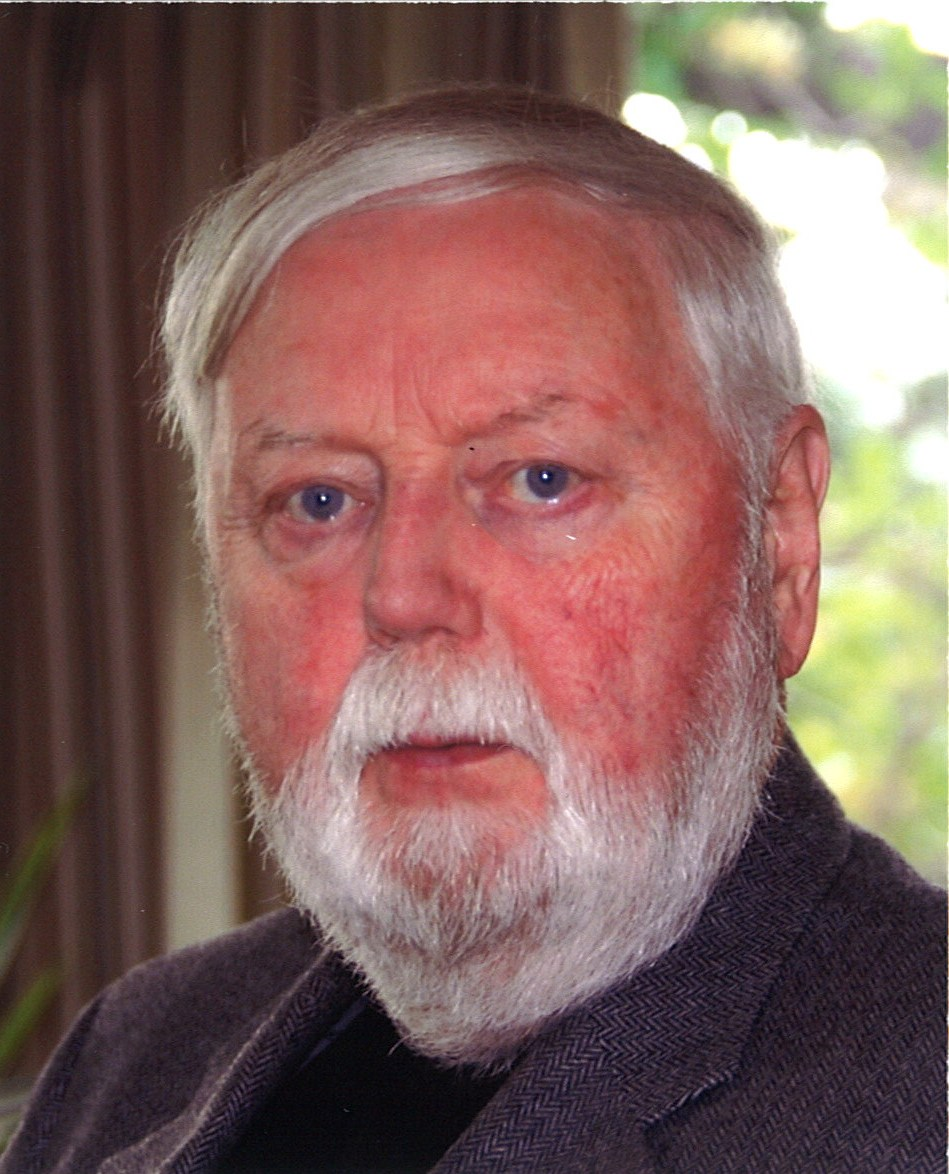
- Born: 17 May 1928; Sømna Municipality, Norway
- Died: 4 December 2015 (aged 87); Levanger, Norway
- Occupation: Writer

Dag Skogheim (17 May 1928 – 4 December 2015) was a Norwegian teacher, poet, novelist, short story writer, biographer and non-fiction writer.

== Biography ==
He was born in Sømna Municipality and grew up in the town of Brønnøysund. His parents were Halvdan Marius Pettersen Skogheim (1901–1974) and Edel Markussen (1906–1993). He attended the Elverum Teacher School and later Trondheim Teachers College prior to attending the University of Oslo. Between 1961 and 1972 he worked as a teacher in Ålesund Municipality, Rendalen Municipality and Asker Municipality.

He made his literary debut in 1970 with the poetry collection ... gagns menneske. From 1972 he worked as a full-time writer. His literary breakthrough came in 1980, with the documentary novel Sulis, the first of a four-volume chronicle about migrant railway construction workers in Northern Norway. He received the Nordland county's cultural award in 1991, and in the same year he received a lifelong government scholarship. Sanatorieliv from 2001 is a treatment of medical, social and cultural aspects of tuberculosis, partly based upon his own childhood experiences, when he spent eleven years in various sanatoriums. The book was awarded the Sverre Steen Prize from the Norwegian Historical Association in 2002.

He was also a long-time columnist for Klassekampen. He died in December 2015.
