= Berg, Nordland =

Village in Sømna Municipality, Norway

Berg
- Village
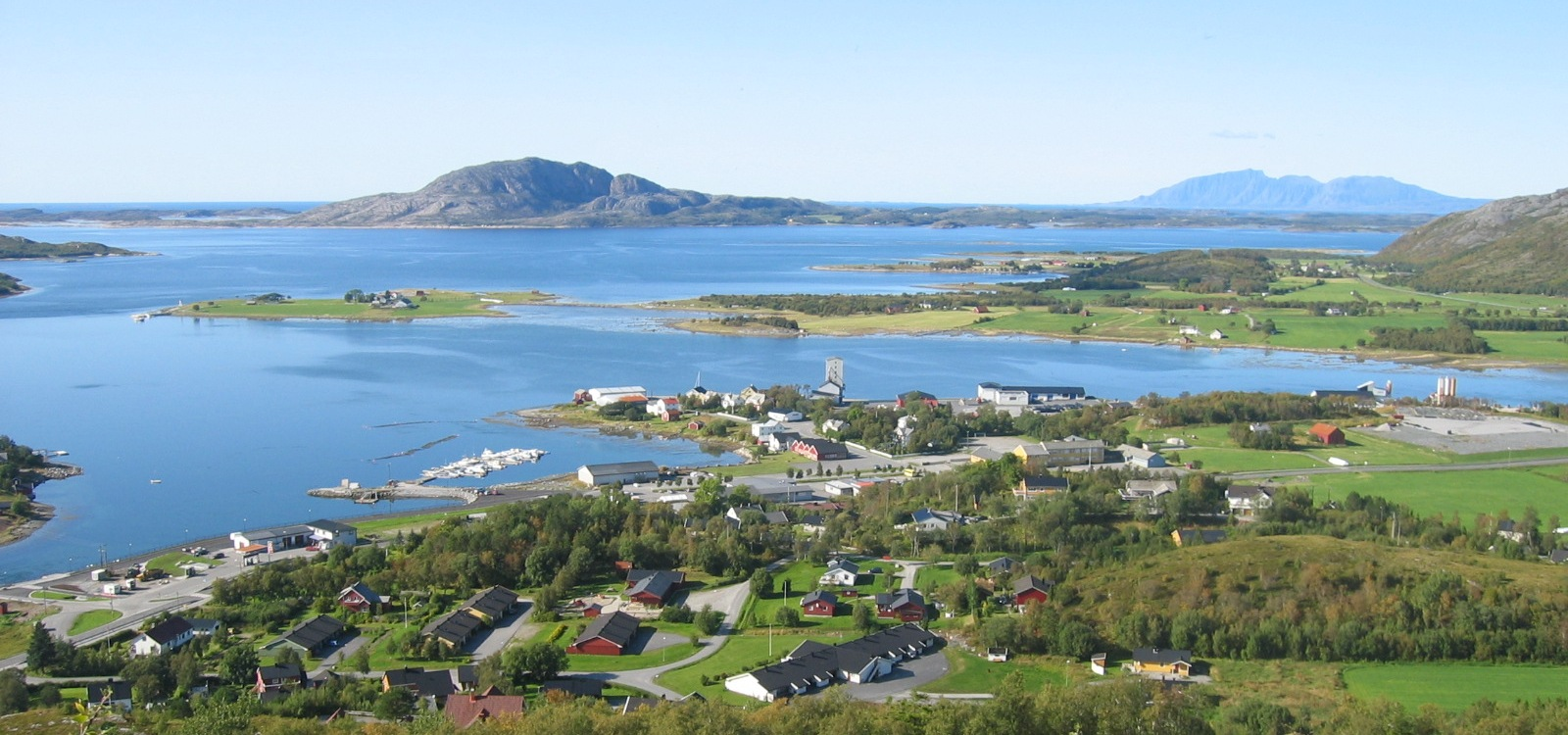
- View of the village
- Interactive map of Berg
- Location within Nordland Location within Norway
- Coordinates: 65.3675°N 12.1977°E
- Country: Norway
- Region: Northern Norway
- County: Nordland
- District: Helgeland
- Municipality: Sømna Municipality

Area
  - Total: 0.64 km^{2} (0.25 sq mi)
- Elevation: 3 m (9.8 ft)

Population (2024)
  - Total: 599
  - Density: 936/km^{2} (2,420/sq mi)
- Time zone: UTC+01:00 (CET)
  - Summer (DST): UTC+02:00 (CEST)
- Post Code: 8920 Sømna

Berg is a village in Sømna Municipality in Nordland county, Norway. The village lies along the Norwegian County Road 17, about 8 kilometres (5.0 mi) north of the village of Vik, just south of the border with Brønnøy Municipality. The village of Trælnes lies just north of Berg (in Brønnøy Municipality). The village is home to some agricultural industries as well as a concrete factory.

The 0.64-square-kilometre (160-acre) village has a population (2024) of 599 and a population density of 936 inhabitants per square kilometre (2,420/sq mi). About 0.02 square kilometres (4.9 acres) of this urban area, with 11 residents, is located in the neighboring Brønnøy Municipality and the rest lies in Sømna Municipality.
