= Hans Gunnar Holand =

Norwegian politician (born 1970)

Hans Gunnar Holand (born 20 April 1970) is a Norwegian politician for the Centre Party.

He was elected as a deputy representative to the Parliament of Norway from Nordland for the term and 2021–2025. In 2015 he became mayor of Sømna Municipality; taking over in the middle of the election term since his predecessor stepped down. Holand served again from 2019, but did not seek re-election in 2023. The same year he became deputy member of the Centre Party's central board.
