= 1914 Jubilee Exhibition =

Exhibition in Norway

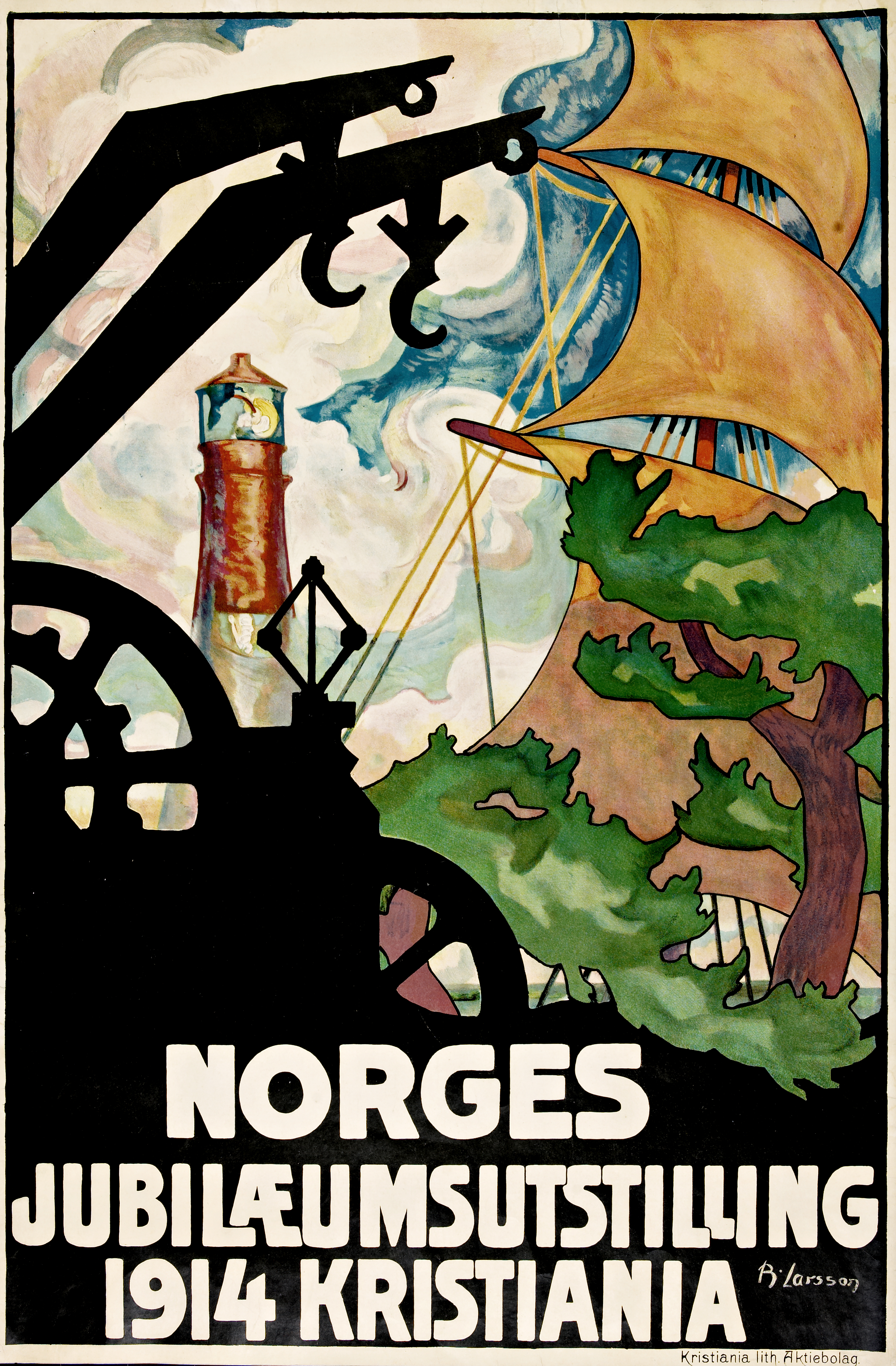
Exhibition poster

The 1914 Jubilee Exhibition took place in Kristiania, Norway, from May 5 to October 11, 1914. It marked the centennial anniversary of the 1814 constitution and focused on industry and agriculture. The main location was the grounds of Frogner Manor (the site of the current Frogner Park), in addition to a subsection on shipping at Skarpsno at Frognerkilen. The exhibition opened on 15 May, and was closed on 11 October 1914. The total number of visitors was more than 1.5 million. On 11 October, the final day, more than 100,000 visitors visited the exhibition.

== Planning ==
The idea for the exhibition is credited to architect Torolf Prytz, in a proposal to the board of Kristiania haandverks- og industriforening in 1907. Prytz became chairman of the planning committee, and later also chairman of the exhibition. Various location alternatives were discussed, including Hovedøya, but it was finally decided on Frogner. In August 1911 the Kristiania city council granted a funding of 300,000 kr to the exhibition, in addition to extra funding for street modifications.

== Exhibition pavilions ==
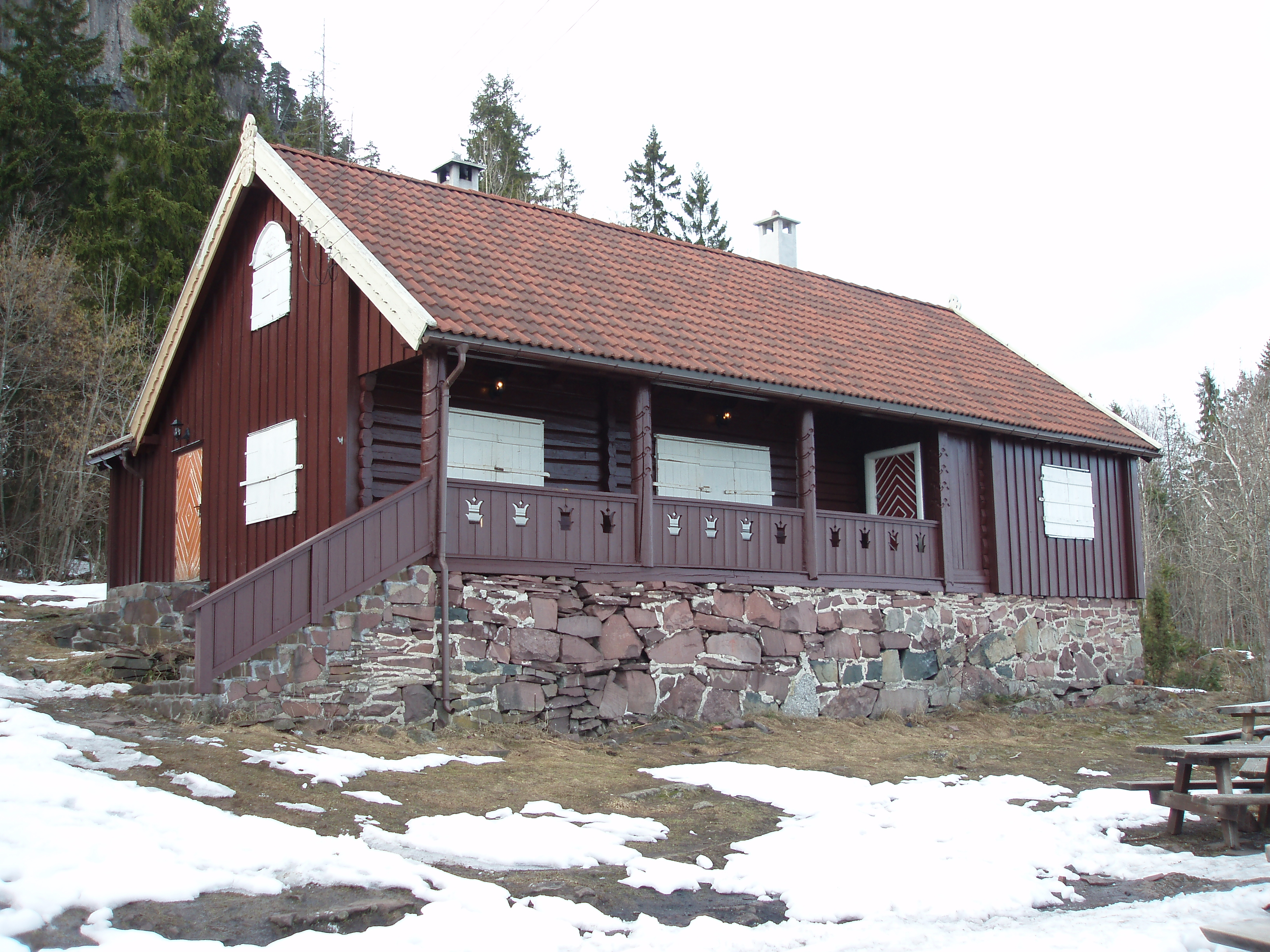
The cabin designed by Berner & Berner won a prize for best tourist cabin. It was moved to Kolsås after the exhibition, later known as KIF-hytta.

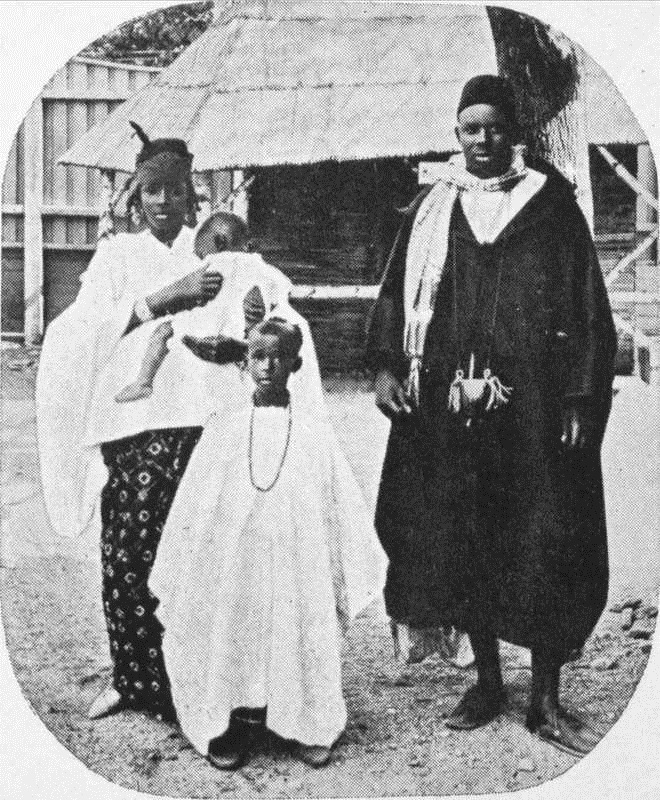
Africans from the Kongo village at the exhibition

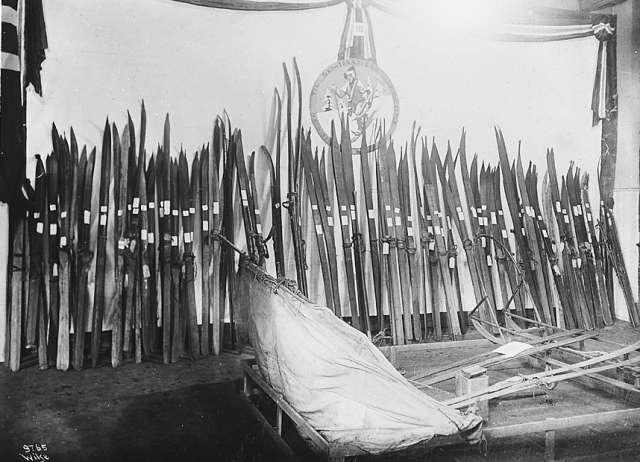
Hjalmar Welhaven's ski collection

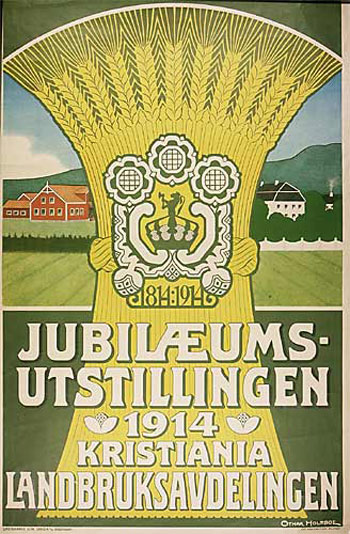
Poster for the agriculture department

The park area was designed by architect Josef Nickelsen, and leading architects were Henrik Bull, August Nielsen, Rudolf Emanuel Jacobsen and Adolf Jensen. The exhibition showcased developments in Norway over the last 100 years. Among the pavilions were the Industry Hall, the Machinery Hall, restaurants, and more than hundred other buildings. Two locomotives were on display, one constructed at Hamar Jernstøperi og Mekaniske Verksted, the other at Thunes Mekaniske Verksted. Kværner Bruk won a gold medal for their contributions, which included construction elements of the Machinery hall. Lilleborg's soap bubble fountain, which was placed in the Industry Hall, attracted some attention. A department of agriculture included a farm with barn and living house, in addition to separate exhibition buildings for forestry and agriculture. Among the exhibitions was a village with 80 inhabitants brought in from Kongo; it was called the Congo Village.

Other amusements were a 700 meter long roller coaster, the Tanagra theatre, and Lilleputbanen. Another display was Hjalmar Welhaven's large collection of skis. A maritime department was located in Frognerkilen, at Skarpsno.

Most of the pavilions were demolished after the exhibition, with a few exceptions.

== Events ==
The exhibition opened on 5 May 1914, and was met with great interest from the public. Among the performances in "Sangerhallen" was Edvard Grieg's Kongekvadet, and a new cantata written by Nils Collett Vogt with music by Christian Sinding. Actor Johan Fahlstrøm recited the national hymn "Ja, vi elsker dette landet". The exhibition was declared open by King Haakon. In the evening a dinner was given for 1,400 invited guests, which included 300 mayors from various municipalities.

Several large gatherings took place during the exhibition period. At one assembly the restaurant served dinner for 4,000 guests. On 4 July a dinner was served for 2,600 guests. In July the exhibition faced some unexpected problems. A tram strike reduced the accessibility drastically. At the outbreak of World War I the Tyrolean orchestra and a German brass band had to leave, heading for the front. On 8 August the number of visitors was below 2,000 for the first time, but from then on the daily number of visitors increased again. On 4 October there were 30,000 visitors. On the closing day, Sunday, 11 October, there were more than 100,000 visitors, and a fireworks ceremony ended the exhibition. During the whole period, the exhibition had total of about 1.5 million visits.

== The Congo Village-exhibition ==
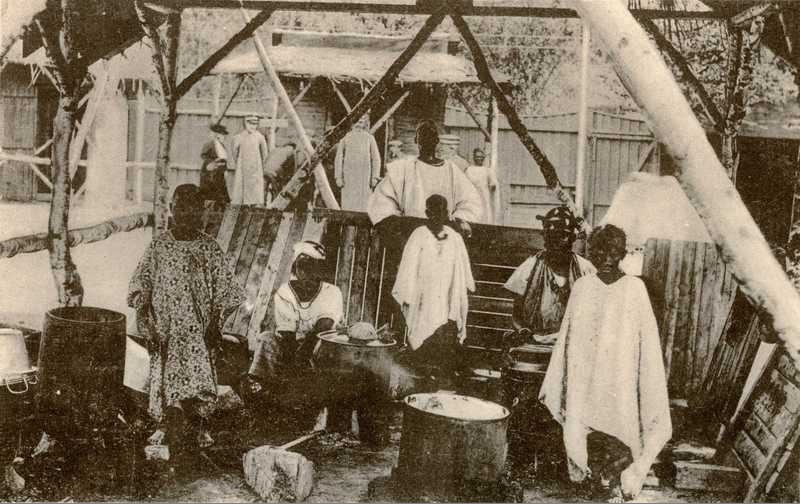
From the Kongo village

The Kongo village was regarded as popular and exotic; "the public appeared as they were mesmerized. All day they could stand and stare at the activities of the around 80 aborigins"; spectators "let themselves mesmerize by the fantastic African village", according to Sverre Bjørstad Graff. (At the time there probably were not any Africans who lived in Oslo, but at traveling fairs (tivoli) Africans were occasionally encountered.)

The exhibition also led to a heated newspaper debate. During the planning stage of the exhibition, a Dagbladet article said that it would be preferable with a large open-air theatre in the entertainment area rather than a "gang of filthy, begging rascals from the fever swamps of Zulu".

Benno Singer was the man behind this exhibition, and he "clearly knew what was required to catch the public's attention", according to Graff.

The village's inhabitants were from Senegal.

Reactions to the Congo Village include the 2014 "construction of a copy of the Congo Village that stood in Frogner Park in 1914", according to Dagbladet. The constructors of the 2014 "village", will be artists Mohammed Ali Fadlabi and Lars Cuzner.
