= Vik, Sømna =

Village in Sømna Municipality, Norway

Vik Vik i Helgeland
- Village
- Interactive map of Vik
- Location within Nordland Location within Norway
- Coordinates: 65.3125°N 12.1673°E
- Country: Norway
- Region: Northern Norway
- County: Nordland
- District: Helgeland
- Municipality: Sømna Municipality

Area
  - Total: 0.51 km^{2} (0.20 sq mi)
- Elevation: 14 m (46 ft)

Population (2024)
  - Total: 360
  - Density: 706/km^{2} (1,830/sq mi)
- Time zone: UTC+01:00 (CET)
  - Summer (DST): UTC+02:00 (CEST)
- Post Code: 8920 Sømna

Vik (also Vik i Helgeland) is the administrative centre of Sømna Municipality in Nordland county, Norway. The village lies along the Norwegian County Road 17, about 8 kilometres (5.0 mi) south of the village of Berg. The local church, Sømna Church, was built in 1876.

The 0.51-square-kilometre (130-acre) village has a population (2024) of 360 and a population density of 706 inhabitants per square kilometre (1,830/sq mi).
