= Sømna Church =

Church in Nordland, Norway

- Sømna kirke
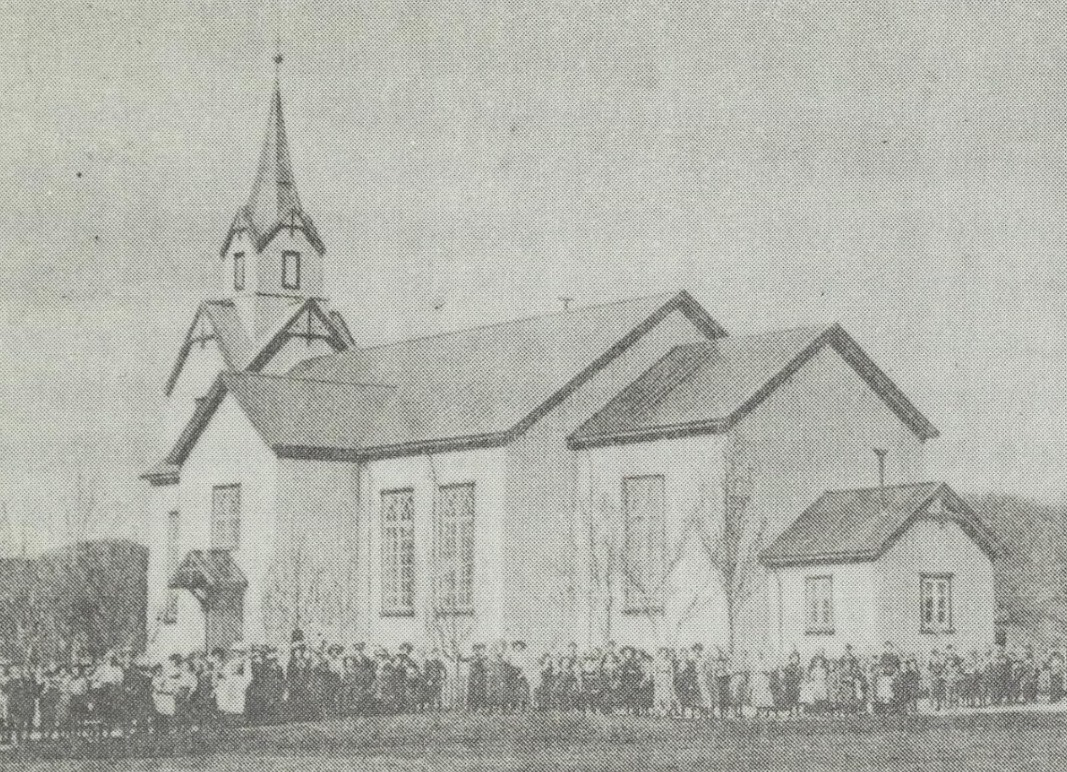
- View of the church
- Sømna Church
- 65.3108646°N 12.1629998°E
- Location: Sømna Municipality, Nordland
- Country: Norway
- Denomination: Church of Norway
- Churchmanship: Evangelical Lutheran

History
- Status: Parish church
- Founded: 14th century
- Consecrated: 1876

Architecture
- Functional status: Active
- Architect: Ole Scheistrøen
- Architectural type: Cruciform
- Completed: 1876 (150 years ago)

Specifications
- Capacity: 600
- Materials: Wood

Administration
- Diocese: Sør-Hålogaland
- Deanery: Sør-Helgeland prosti
- Parish: Sømna
- Norwegian Cultural Heritage Site
- Type: Church
- Status: Listed
- ID: 85039

Sømna Church (Norwegian: Sømna kirke) is a parish church of the Church of Norway in Sømna Municipality in Nordland county, Norway. It is located in the village of Vik i Helgeland. It is the church for the Sømna parish which is part of the Sør-Helgeland prosti (deanery) in the Diocese of Sør-Hålogaland. The white, wooden church was built in a cruciform style in 1876 using plans drawn up by the architect Ole Scheistrøen. The church seats about 600 people.

== History ==
The earliest existing historical records of the church date back to the year 1432, but it was not new that year. The first church was likely a rectangular timber-framed building with a rectangular nave with a narrower rectangular chancel with a lower roof line. It had a small tower on the roof of the nave. This church was located about 225 metres (738 ft) north of the present site of the church. In 1681, the old church was torn down and a new cruciform church was built on the same site to replace it.

In 1873, it was decided to build a new and larger church, but there wasn't room on the current church site. A new plot of land about 225 metres (738 ft) north of the old church site was bought from Einar Ingebrigtsen Vik. The new church building was completed in 1876. After the new church was completed, the old church was torn down and its materials were sold at auction in the village. The old cemetery (surrounding the old church) was used until 1980 when a new cemetery was opened.

== See also ==
- List of churches in Sør-Hålogaland
