= Sømna Municipality =

Municipality in Nordland, Norway

Sømna Municipality Sømna kommune
- Municipality
- Vik herred (historic name)
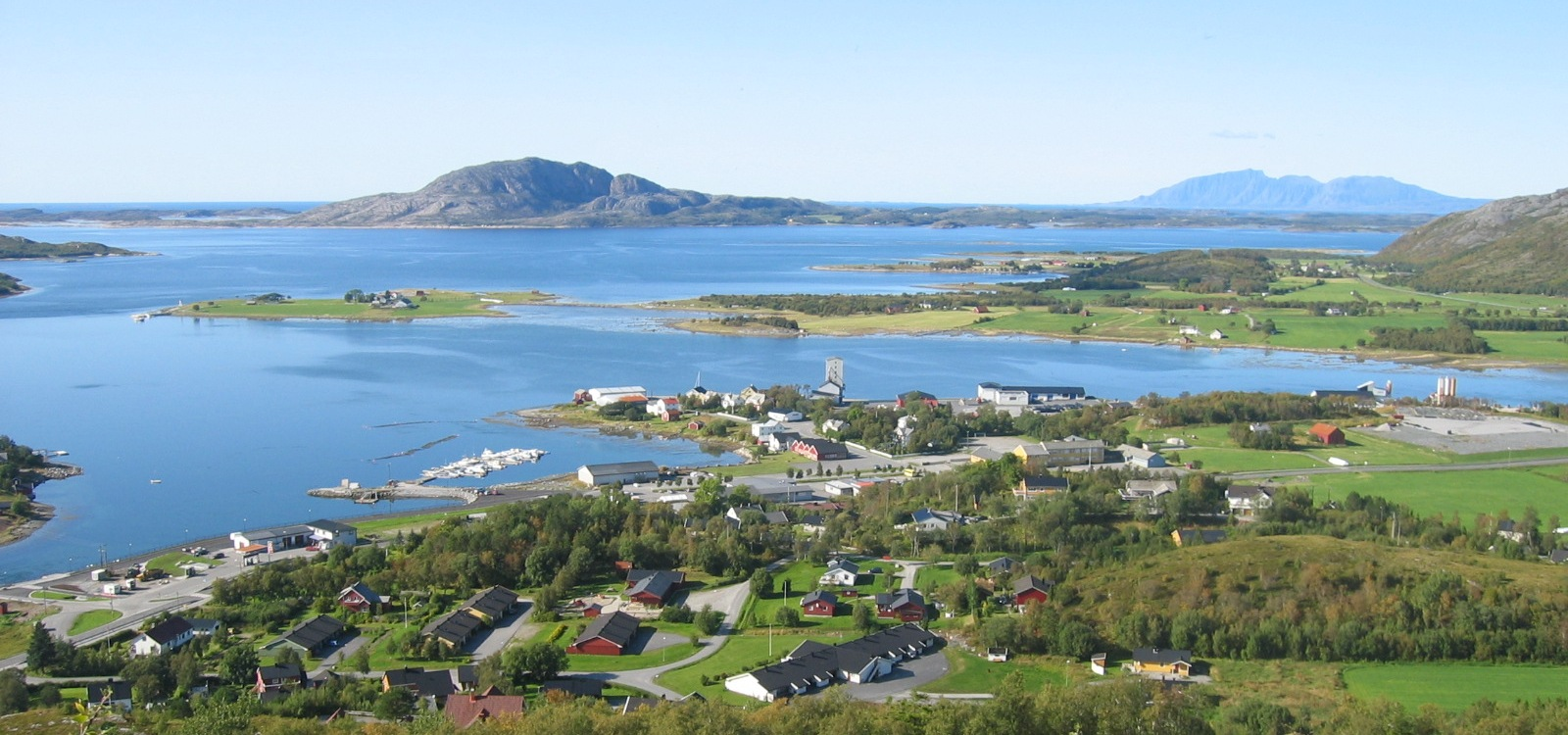
- View of the village of Berg

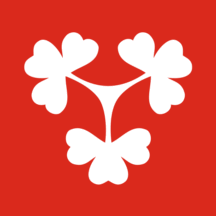
- Flag Coat of arms

- Nordland within Norway

- Sømna within Nordland
- Coordinates: 65°19′25″N 12°10′38″E
- Country: Norway
- County: Nordland
- District: Helgeland
- Established: 1 Jan 1901
  - Preceded by: Brønnøy Municipality
- Disestablished: 1 Jan 1964
  - Succeeded by: Brønnøy Municipality
- Re-established: 1 Jan 1977
  - Preceded by: Brønnøy Municipality
- Administrative centre: Vik i Helgeland

Government
  - Mayor (2023): Gunder Strømberg (LL)

Area
  - Total: 195.19 km^{2} (75.36 sq mi)
  - Land: 191.62 km^{2} (73.98 sq mi)
  - Water: 3.57 km^{2} (1.38 sq mi) 1.8%
  - Rank: #302 in Norway
- Highest elevation: 648.45 m (2,127.5 ft)

Population (2024)
  - Total: 1,976
  - Rank: #282 in Norway
  - Density: 10.1/km^{2} (26/sq mi)
  - Change (10 years): ▼ −3.5%
- Demonym: Sømnværing

Official language
  - Norwegian form: Bokmål
- Time zone: UTC+01:00 (CET)
  - Summer (DST): UTC+02:00 (CEST)
- ISO 3166 code: NO-1812
- Website: Official website

Sømna is a municipality in Nordland county, Norway. It is part of the Helgeland traditional region. The administrative center of Sømna is the village of Vik i Helgeland. Other villages in the municipality include Dalbotn, Sund, Vennesund, and Berg.

The 195-square-kilometre (75 sq mi) municipality is the 302nd largest by area out of the 357 municipalities in Norway. Sømna Municipality is the 282md most populous municipality in Norway with a population of 1,976. The municipality's population density is 10.1 inhabitants per square kilometre (26/sq mi) and its population has decreased by 3.5% over the previous 10-year period.

The oldest remains of a boat ever found in Norway (the 2,500-year-old Haugvikbåten) was discovered in a bog in Sømna.

Sømna has some of the best agriculture in the region. Dairy and beef cows as well as grains are produced in Sømna. There is also a dairy in Berg that produces milk and cheese.

== General information ==
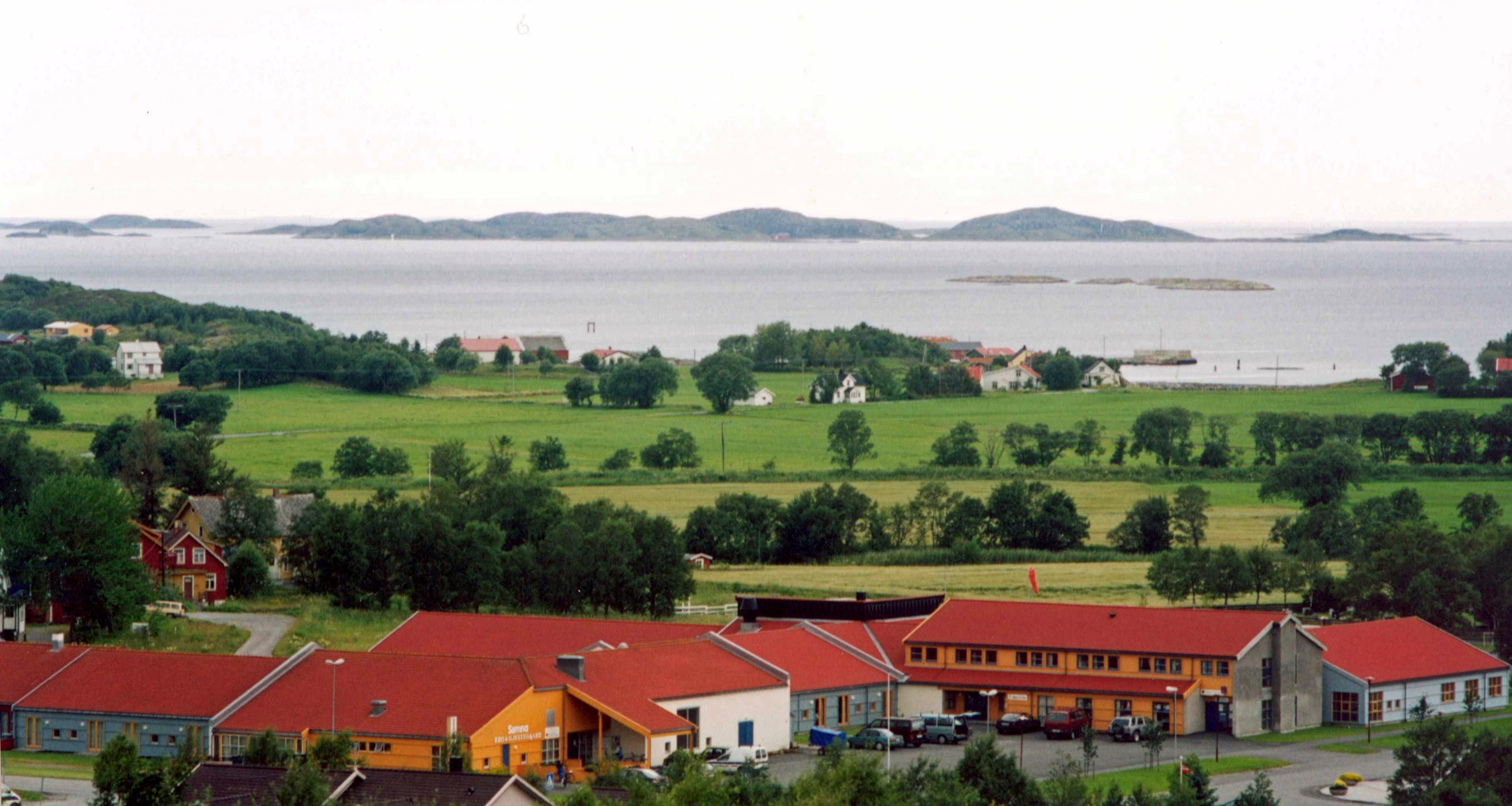
View of the Sømna coast

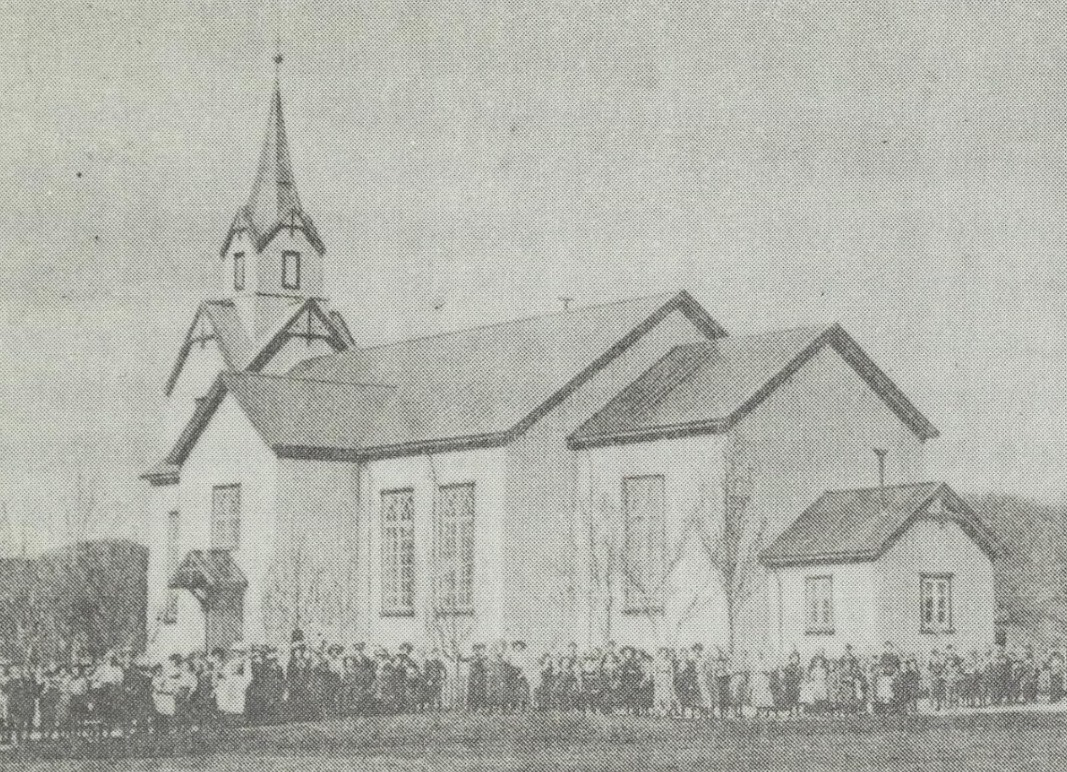
Sømna Church

The new Vik Municipality was established on 1 January 1901 when it was separated from the large Brønnøy Municipality. The initial population of Vik Municipality was 2,731. In 1941, the municipality was renamed Sømna Municipality. During the 1960s, there were many municipal mergers across Norway due to the work of the Schei Committee. On 1 January 1964, a major municipal merger took place. The following areas were merged to form a new, larger Brønnøy Municipality:

- the town of Brønnøysund (population: 2,064)
- all of Sømna Municipality (population: 2,347)
- all of Brønnøy Municipality (population: 2,635)
- all of Velfjord Municipality (population: 1,380)
- the part of Bindal Municipality located in the Lande-Tosbotn area around the inner Bindalsfjorden (population: 296)

This merger was short-lived because on 1 January 1977, all of the old Sømna Municipality (except the Hongsetbygda area) was removed from Brønnøy Municipality to become a separate Sømna Municipality once again. There were 2,107 residents in the newly recreated Sømna Municipality.

=== Name ===
The municipality (originally the parish) is named after the old Vik farm (Old Norse: Vík) since the first Sømna Church was built there. The name is identical with the word vík which means "bay" or "inlet", here referring to the bay near the church that is now called Vikvågen.

On 13 November 1940, a royal resolution changed the spelling of the name of the municipality to Sømna starting on 1 December 1940. The new name was reminiscent of an old name for the area that was historically spelled as Sæmnese or Sørsøm (Old Norse: Søfn). The meaning of the name is unknown, but it is possibly derived from the word sveifa which means "wind" or "wave" or it could be derived from the word svefja which means a "quiet sleep".

=== Coat of arms ===
The coat of arms was granted on 14 June 1991. The official blazon is "Gules, three trefoils argent in pall stems conjoined" (Norwegian: I rødt tre sølv kløverblad forent i trepass). This means the arms have a red field (background) and the charge is a group of three clover leaves (trefoils). The clover has a tincture of argent which means it is commonly colored white, but if it is made out of metal, then silver is used. The arms symbolize agriculture, culture, and prosperity combined. The arms were designed by Rolf Tidemann.

=== Churches ===
The Church of Norway has one parish (sokn) within Sømna Municipality. It is part of the Sør-Helgeland prosti (deanery) in the Diocese of Sør-Hålogaland.

Churches in Sømna Municipality
Parish (sokn)	Church name	Location of the church	Year built
Sømna	Sømna Church	Vik i Helgeland	1876

== Geography and climate ==
The municipality of Sømna is mostly made up of the southern part of a peninsula off the mainland of Norway and the surrounding islands. It borders Brønnøy Municipality to the north by land and Bindal Municipality to the south and east by sea, across the Bindalsfjorden.

Sømna consists mainly of a wide Strandflaten lowland (coastal brim), and is one of few municipalities in Northern Norway where the farmers still grow some grain. The highest point in the municipality is the 648.45-metre (2,127.5 ft) tall mountain Lysingen, on the border with Brønnøy Municipality.

Sømna has an oceanic climate with few temperature extremes, similar to Brønnøysund. However, Sømna has one national heat record: The warmest night ever recorded in Norway was July 29, 2019 at Sømna-Kvaløyfjellet (302 m) in Sømna with overnight low 26.1 °C (79.0 °F).

== Media gallery ==
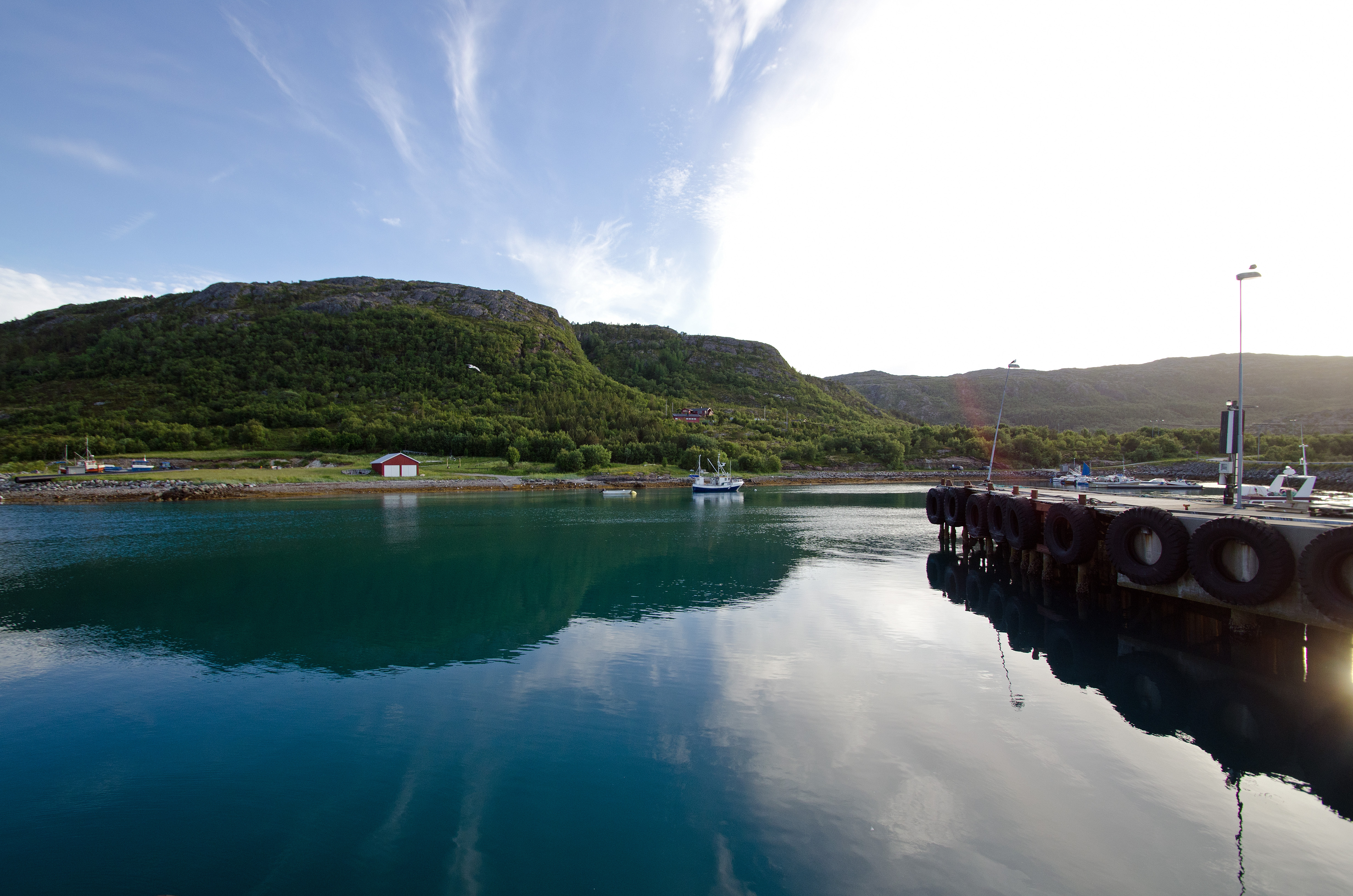
Norwegian ferry

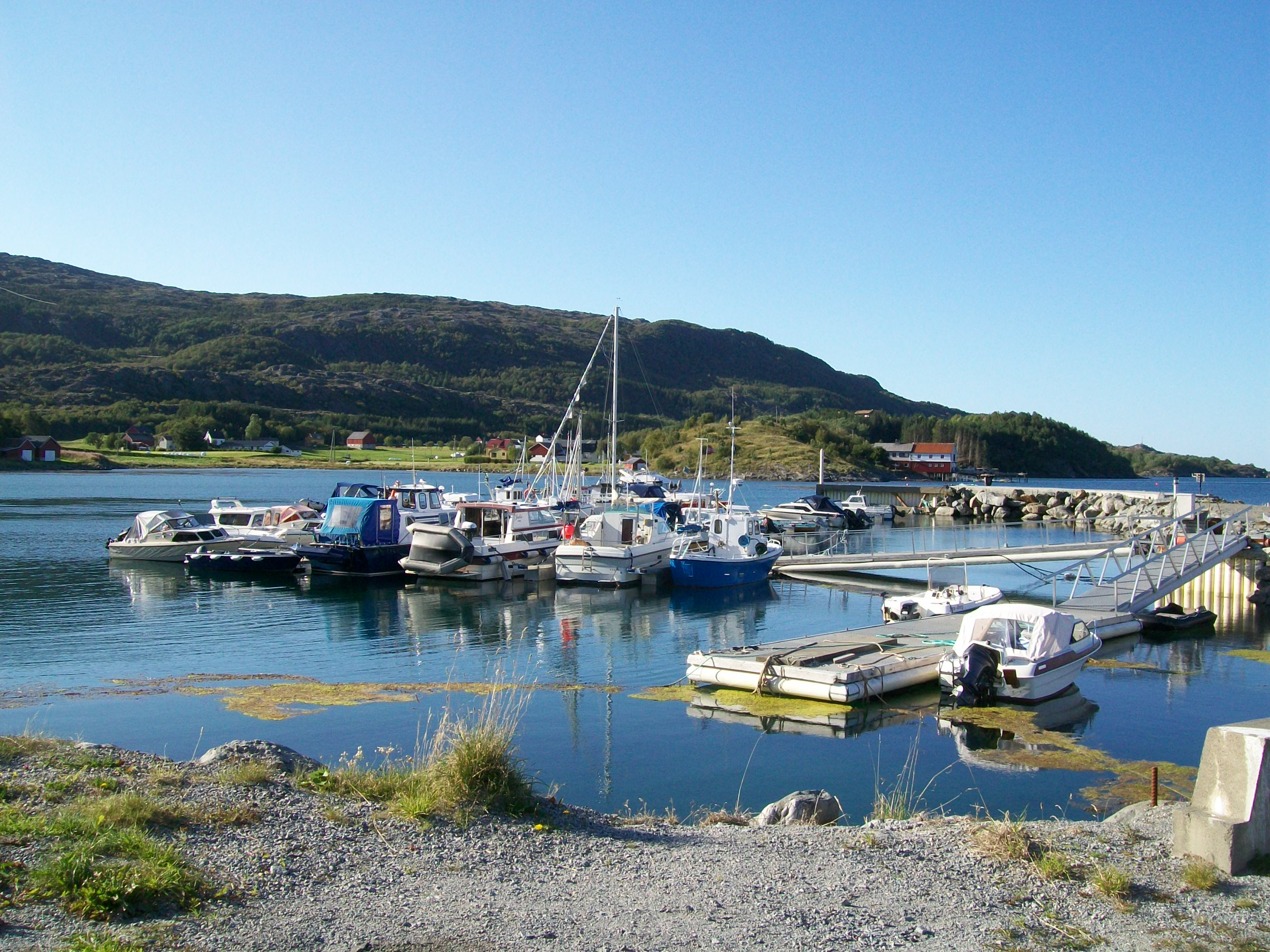
Vennesund Harbour

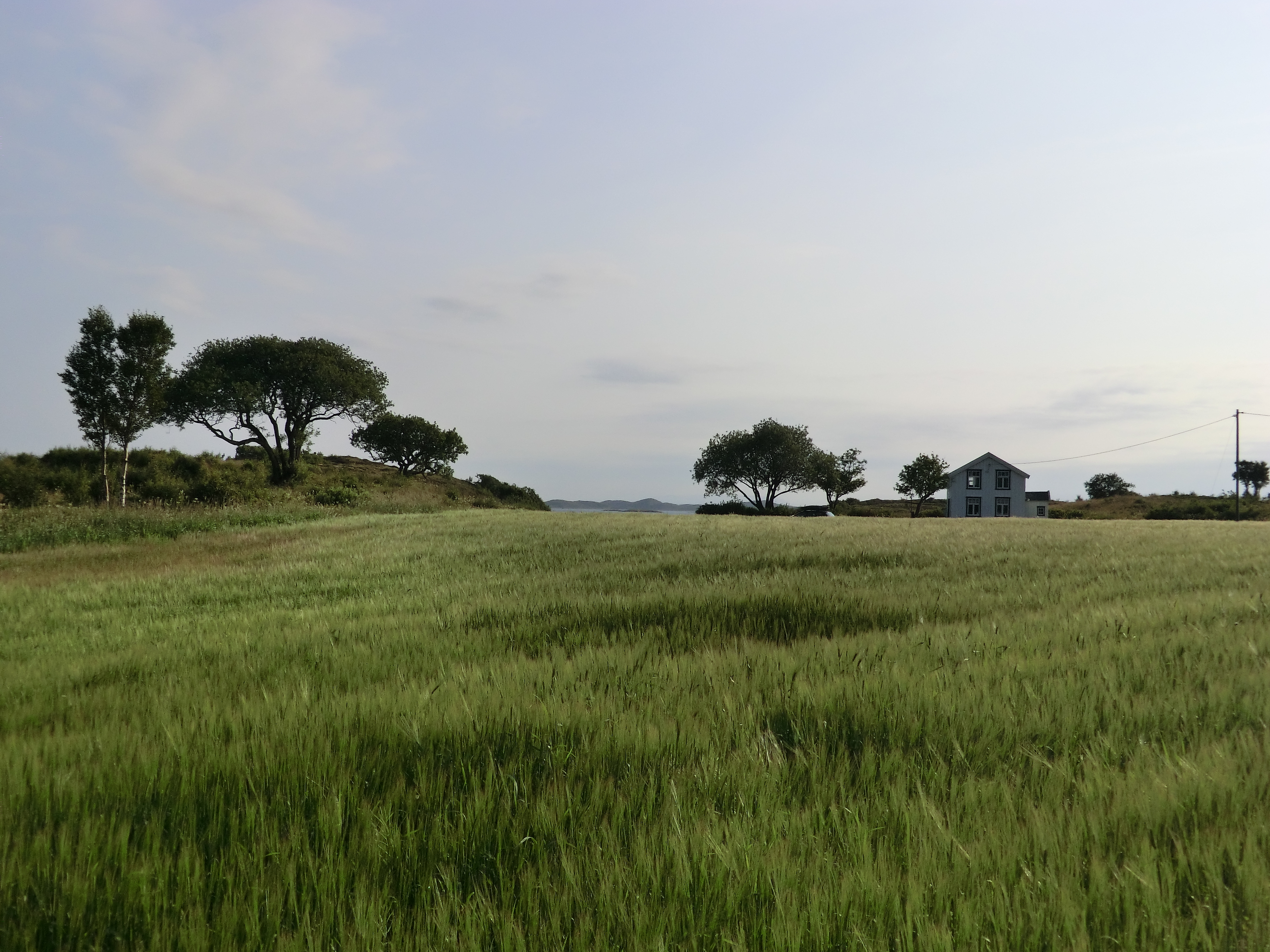
Agricultural area in Sømna

== Government ==
Sømna Municipality is responsible for primary education (through 10th grade), outpatient health services, senior citizen services, welfare and other social services, zoning, economic development, and municipal roads and utilities. The municipality is governed by a municipal council of directly elected representatives. The mayor is indirectly elected by a vote of the municipal council. The municipality is under the jurisdiction of the Helgeland District Court and the Hålogaland Court of Appeal.

=== Municipal council ===
The municipal council (Kommunestyre) of Sømna Municipality is made up of 17 representatives that are elected to four year terms. The tables below show the current and historical composition of the council by political party.

Sømna kommunestyre 2023–2027
Party name (in Norwegian)	Number of representatives
Labour Party (Arbeiderpartiet)	3
Red Party (Rødt)	4
Centre Party (Senterpartiet)	5
Cross-party list Sømna (Tverrpolitisk liste Sømna)	5
Total number of members:	17

Sømna kommunestyre 2019–2023
Party name (in Norwegian)	Number of representatives
Labour Party (Arbeiderpartiet)	3
Conservative Party (Høyre)	1
Red Party (Rødt)	1
Centre Party (Senterpartiet)	9
Cross-party list Sømna (Tverrpolitisk liste Sømna)	3
Total number of members:	17

Sømna kommunestyre 2015–2019
Party name (in Norwegian)	Number of representatives
Labour Party (Arbeiderpartiet)	5
Progress Party (Fremskrittspartiet)	1
Centre Party (Senterpartiet)	7
Cross-party list Sømna (Tverrpolitisk liste Sømna)	4
Total number of members:	17

Sømna kommunestyre 2011–2015
Party name (in Norwegian)	Number of representatives
Labour Party (Arbeiderpartiet)	3
Progress Party (Fremskrittspartiet)	1
Christian Democratic Party (Kristelig Folkeparti)	1
Centre Party (Senterpartiet)	6
Cross-party list Sømna (Tverrpolitisk liste Sømna)	5
Sømna Local List (Sømna Bygdeliste)	1
Total number of members:	17

Sømna kommunestyre 2007–2011
Party name (in Norwegian)	Number of representatives
Labour Party (Arbeiderpartiet)	6
Progress Party (Fremskrittspartiet)	1
Joint list of the Centre Party (Senterpartiet) and the Christian Democratic Party (Kristelig Folkeparti)	9
Sømna local list (Sømna bygdeliste)	1
Total number of members:	17

Sømna kommunestyre 2003–2007
Party name (in Norwegian)	Number of representatives
Labour Party (Arbeiderpartiet)	3
Conservative Party (Høyre)	1
Christian Democratic Party (Kristelig Folkeparti)	1
Centre Party (Senterpartiet)	10
Sømna Local List (Sømna Bygdeliste)	2
Total number of members:	17

Sømna kommunestyre 1999–2003
Party name (in Norwegian)	Number of representatives
Labour Party (Arbeiderpartiet)	5
Conservative Party (Høyre)	2
Christian Democratic Party (Kristelig Folkeparti)	1
Centre Party (Senterpartiet)	5
Socialist Left Party (Sosialistisk Venstreparti)	3
Local list (Bygdeliste)	1
Total number of members:	17

Sømna kommunestyre 1995–1999
Party name (in Norwegian)	Number of representatives
Labour Party (Arbeiderpartiet)	3
Conservative Party (Høyre)	1
Socialist Left Party (Sosialistisk Venstreparti)	1
Joint list of the Centre Party (Senterpartiet) and the Christian Democratic Party (Kristelig Folkeparti)	9
Sømna Local list (Sømna Bygdeliste)	3
Total number of members:	17

Sømna kommunestyre 1991–1995
Party name (in Norwegian)	Number of representatives
Labour Party (Arbeiderpartiet)	4
Conservative Party (Høyre)	1
Socialist Left Party (Sosialistisk Venstreparti)	2
Joint list of the Centre Party (Senterpartiet) and the Christian Democratic Party (Kristelig Folkeparti)	8
Sømna local list (Sømna bygdeliste)	2
Total number of members:	17

Sømna kommunestyre 1987–1991
Party name (in Norwegian)	Number of representatives
Labour Party (Arbeiderpartiet)	7
Conservative Party (Høyre)	2
Christian Democratic Party (Kristelig Folkeparti)	1
Centre Party (Senterpartiet)	5
Socialist Left Party (Sosialistisk Venstreparti)	2
Total number of members:	17

Sømna kommunestyre 1983–1987
Party name (in Norwegian)	Number of representatives
Labour Party (Arbeiderpartiet)	6
Conservative Party (Høyre)	2
Christian Democratic Party (Kristelig Folkeparti)	1
Centre Party (Senterpartiet)	6
Socialist Left Party (Sosialistisk Venstreparti)	2
Total number of members:	17

Sømna kommunestyre 1979–1983
Party name (in Norwegian)	Number of representatives
Labour Party (Arbeiderpartiet)	7
Conservative Party (Høyre)	2
Christian Democratic Party (Kristelig Folkeparti)	1
Centre Party (Senterpartiet)	7
Total number of members:	17
Note: On 1 January 1977, Sømna Municipality was separated from Brønnøy Municipality and a temporary 2-year municipal council took office until the next regular election.

Sømna herredsstyre 1959–1963
Party name (in Norwegian)	Number of representatives
Labour Party (Arbeiderpartiet)	10
Conservative Party (Høyre)	1
Christian Democratic Party (Kristelig Folkeparti)	2
Centre Party (Senterpartiet)	4
Total number of members:	17
Note: On 1 January 1964, Sømna Municipality became part of Brønnøy Municipality.

Sømna herredsstyre 1955–1959
Party name (in Norwegian)	Number of representatives
Labour Party (Arbeiderpartiet)	9
Conservative Party (Høyre)	1
Christian Democratic Party (Kristelig Folkeparti)	2
Farmers' Party (Bondepartiet)	4
Local List(s) (Lokale lister)	1
Total number of members:	17

Sømna herredsstyre 1951–1955
Party name (in Norwegian)	Number of representatives
Labour Party (Arbeiderpartiet)	9
Christian Democratic Party (Kristelig Folkeparti)	2
Farmers' Party (Bondepartiet)	4
Local List(s) (Lokale lister)	1
Total number of members:	16

Sømna herredsstyre 1947–1951
Party name (in Norwegian)	Number of representatives
Labour Party (Arbeiderpartiet)	9
Christian Democratic Party (Kristelig Folkeparti)	2
Farmers' Party (Bondepartiet)	4
Local List(s) (Lokale lister)	1
Total number of members:	16

Sømna herredsstyre 1945–1947
Party name (in Norwegian)	Number of representatives
Labour Party (Arbeiderpartiet)	12
Local List(s) (Lokale lister)	4
Total number of members:	16

Vik herredsstyre 1937–1941*
Party name (in Norwegian)	Number of representatives
Labour Party (Arbeiderpartiet)	9
Local List(s) (Lokale lister)	7
Total number of members:	16
Note: Due to the German occupation of Norway during World War II, no elections were held for new municipal councils until after the war ended in 1945.

=== Mayors ===
The mayor (Norwegian: ordfører) of Sømna Municipality is the political leader of the municipality and the chairperson of the municipal council. Here is a list of people who have held this position:

- 1901–1902: Christen Heide Nielsen
- 1902–1904: Jørgen Andreas Storvik (V)
- 1905–1919: Markus Eliassen Sømhovd (V)
- 1920–1922: Cornelius Enge (Ap)
- 1923–1924: Peter Kopreitan (Bp)
- 1924–1924: Albert Valberg (Bp)
- 1925–1939: Cornelius Enge (Ap)
- 1939–1941: Hartvig Hjelmseth (Ap)
- 1942–1945: Trygve Sømhovd (NS)
- 1945–1951: Hartvig Hjelmseth (Ap)
- 1952–1955: Jonas Enge (Ap)
- 1956–1963: Leif Grønmo (Ap)
- (1964–1977: Sømna Municipality did not exist - it was part of Brønnøy Municipality)
- 1977–1979: Gunnar Holand (Sp)
- 1979–1983: Viktor Kolsvik (Sp)
- 1983–1987: Gunnar Holand (Sp)
- 1987–1991: Anne Cathrine Einarsen (Ap)
- 1991–1999: Gunnar Holand (LL)
- 1999–2015: Edmund Harald Dahle (Sp)
- 2015–2015: Hans Gunnar Holand (Sp)
- 2015–2019: Andrine Solli Oppegaard (Ap)
- 2019–2023: Hans Gunnar Holand (Sp)
- 2023–present: Gunder Strømberg (LL)

== Notable people ==
- August Nielsen (1877 in Vik at Sømna – 1956), an architect
- Ludvig Enge (1878 in Vik i Helgeland – 1953), a civil servant and politician
- Dag Skogheim (1928 in Sømna – 2015), a teacher, poet, novelist, short story writer, biographer, and non-fiction writer
