= Skei, Møre og Romsdal =

Village in Surnadal Municipality, Norway

Skei Surnadal
- Village
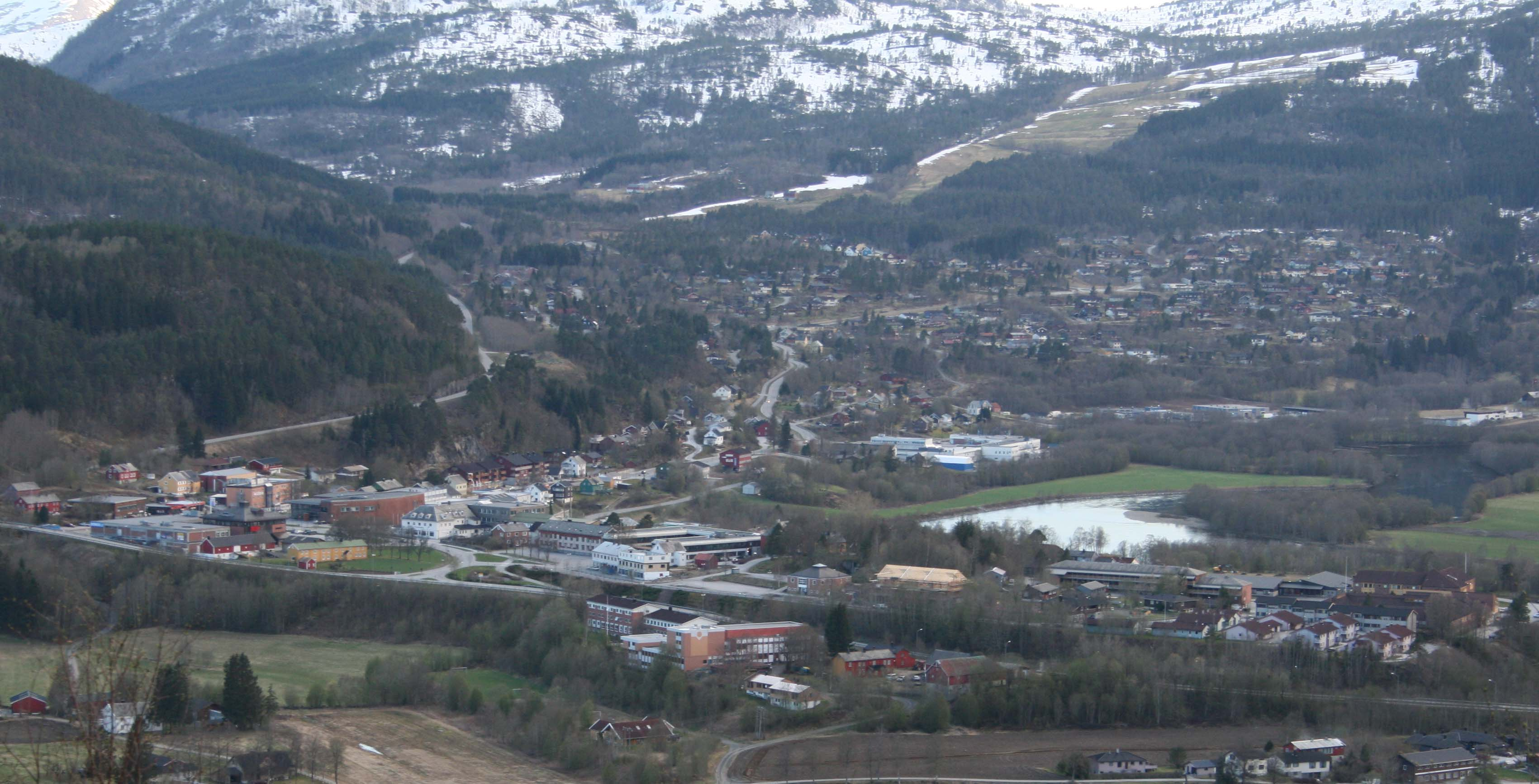
- View of Skei
- Interactive map of Skei; Surnadal
- Location within Møre og Romsdal Location within Norway
- Coordinates: 62.9739°N 8.7263°E
- Country: Norway
- Region: Western Norway
- County: Møre og Romsdal
- District: Nordmøre
- Municipality: Surnadal Municipality
- Elevation: 30 m (98 ft)
- Time zone: UTC+01:00 (CET)
  - Summer (DST): UTC+02:00 (CEST)
- Post Code: 6650 Surnadal

Skei or Surnadal is the administrative center of Surnadal Municipality in Møre og Romsdal county, Norway. The village is located at near the end of the Surnadalsfjorden along the river Surna. It is about 1 kilometre (0.62 mi) northeast of the village of Surnadalsøra and about 2 kilometres (1.2 mi) southeast of the village of Sylte. There are two churches near Skei: Øye Church (north of Skei) and Ranes Church (east of Skei).

Skei is combined with the neighboring village of Surnadalsøra as an "urban area" by Statistics Norway. The 3.33-square-kilometre (820-acre) urban area has a population (2024) of 2,870 and a population density of 862 inhabitants per square kilometre (2,230/sq mi).
